= Bibliographies of the People's Republic of China =

The bibliography of the history of the People's Republic of China covers English-language scholarship on China from the Chinese Civil War to the present. It consists of the following sections:

- Bibliography of the Chinese Civil War and Nationalist era (1927–1949)
- Bibliography of the early People's Republic of China (1949–1957)
- Bibliography of the Great Leap Forward and the Great Chinese Famine (1958–1965)
- Bibliography of the Cultural Revolution (1966–1976)
- Bibliography of China's reform and opening (1976–1989)
- Bibliography of the 1989 Tiananmen Square protests and massacre (1989)
- Bibliography of China from Tiananmen to Xi Jinping (1989–2012)
- Bibliography of the Xi Jinping era (2012–present)

== Biographical ==
- Bibliography of Xi Jinping
- Bibliography of works about Xi Jinping
- Bibliography of works by Mao Zedong
- Bibliography of works about Mao Zedong
- Bibliography of Chiang Kai-shek

== Regional ==
- Bibliography of the history of Tibet
- Bibliography of East Turkestan and the Uyghurs

== Other ==
- Bibliography of Maoism

== See also ==
- Bibliography of Chinese history
- Bibliography of works about communism
- Bibliography of the Soviet Union
