= Bibliography of works about Mao Zedong =

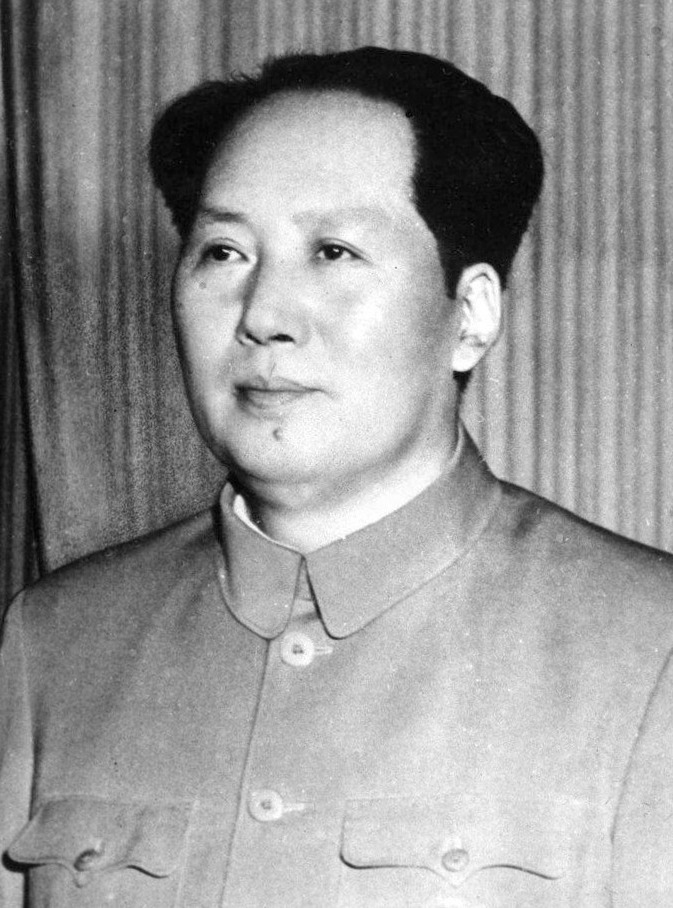
- Mao Zedong, 1950
- Subject: Mao Zedong
- Scope: Books, journal articles, primary sources
- Period covered: 1893 – 1976
- Languages: English
- Related: Bibliography of Chinese history; Bibliography of works by Mao Zedong

This is a select bibliography of academic-level books and journal articles, published mainly after World War II, (Note: Works published during or before World War II should be limited to areas where there are no significant post-World War II books on the subject or when the work in question has significant historical merit.) about Mao Zedong and the historical context of his life and work.

Mao Zedong (Note: /ˈmaʊ (t)səˈtʊŋ/; Chinese: 毛泽东; pinyin: Máo Zédōng pronounced [mǎʊ tsɤ̌.tʊ́ŋ]; traditionally romanised as Mao Tse-tung. In this Chinese name, the family name is Mao and Ze is a generation name. While the pinyin-derived spelling Mao Zedong is increasingly common, the Wade–Giles-derived spelling Mao Tse-tung is still used to some extent in modern publications.) (26 December 1893 – 9 September 1976) was a Chinese communist revolutionary, political theorist and founder of the People's Republic of China (PRC). He served as China's paramount leader from 1949 until his death in 1976, primarily through his role as Chairman of the Chinese Communist Party (CCP). (Note: Mao held the position of CCP leader under the title "Chairman of the CCP Central Politburo" from 20 March 1943 until 19 June 1945, and "Chairman of the CCP Central Committee" from 19 June 1945 until his death on 9 September 1976.) Mao Zedong Thought, which he advocated as a Chinese adaptation of Marxism–Leninism, influenced Maoist movements and organizations worldwide.

This bibliography contains academic-level English-language books (including translations) and journal articles, published mainly after World War II. (Note: Works published before World War II should be limited to areas where there are no significant post–World War II books on the subject, or where the work in question has significant historical merit.) Book entries may have references to reviews published in academic journals or major newspapers when these could be considered helpful. These reference reviews also function as a resource to find other works on this subject.

Works listed here are cited in the notes or bibliographies of scholarly sources. Each is published by an academic or major trade press, written by a recognized expert, or substantially reviewed in scholarly journals; borderline cases are omitted. A selection of primary sources is included. Many of the books below carry their own bibliographies; see Further reading section for longer ones, and External links section for historical sites and museums.

Citations follow APA style. (Note: Entries are in plain text APA 7 format without templates; templates are used only for reviews and notes.) Books have citations to academic journal or mainstream published reviews when available. For books only partly about the subject, relevant chapter or section titles are given where useful and available. Translators of the original-language edition are included when possible. In cases where a title or name has appeared with more than one English spelling, the most recent published form is used and a footnote documents any earlier title under which the work appeared.

== Biographies ==
- Chang, J., & Halliday, J. (2005). Mao: The unknown story. Jonathan Cape.
- Davin, D. (1997). Mao Zedong. Sutton Publishing.
- Feigon, L. (2002). Mao: A reinterpretation. Ivan R. Dee.
- Karl, R. E. (2010). Mao Zedong and China in the twentieth-century world: A concise history. Duke University Press.
- Pantsov, A. V., & Levine, S. I. (2012). Mao: The real story. Simon & Schuster.
- Short, P. (1999). Mao: A life. Hodder & Stoughton.
- Spence, J. D. (1999). Mao Zedong. Viking.
- Walder, A. G. (2015). China under Mao: A revolution derailed. Harvard University Press. doi:10.4159/9780674286689

== Ideology ==
- Apter, D. E., & Saich, T. (1994). Revolutionary discourse in Mao's republic. Harvard University Press.
- Cheek, T. (Ed.). (2010). A critical introduction to Mao. Cambridge University Press. doi:10.1017/cbo9780511781476
- Gao, H. (2018). How the red sun rose: The origins and development of the Yan'an Rectification Movement, 1930–1945 (S. Mosher & J. Guo, Trans.). Chinese University Press. (Original work published 2000)
- Knight, N. (2007). Rethinking Mao: Explorations in Mao Zedong's thought. Lexington Books. doi:10.5771/9780739160312
- Schram, S. R. (1994). Mao Zedong a hundred years on: The legacy of a ruler. The China Quarterly, 137, 125–143. doi:10.1017/s0305741000034068

== The Great Leap Forward ==
- Dikötter, F. (2010). Mao's great famine: The history of China's most devastating catastrophe, 1958–1962. Bloomsbury.
- Shapiro, J. (2001). Mao's war against nature: Politics and the environment in revolutionary China. Cambridge University Press. doi:10.1017/cbo9780511512063
- Teiwes, F. C., & Sun, W. (1999). China's road to disaster: Mao, central politicians, and provincial leaders in the unfolding of the Great Leap Forward, 1955–1959. M. E. Sharpe.
- Wemheuer, F. (2014). Famine politics in Maoist China and the Soviet Union. Yale University Press.
- Yang, J. (2012). Tombstone: The great Chinese famine, 1958–1962 (S. Mosher & J. Guo, Trans.; E. Friedman, J. Guo, & S. Mosher, Eds.). Farrar, Straus and Giroux. (Original work published 2008)

== The Cultural Revolution ==
- Dikötter, F. (2016). The Cultural Revolution: A people's history, 1962–1976. Bloomsbury.
- Landsberger, S. R. (1996). Mao as the Kitchen God: Religious aspects of the Mao cult during the Cultural Revolution. China Information, 11(2–3), 196–214. doi:10.1177/0920203x9601100211
- Leese, D. (2011). Mao cult: Rhetoric and ritual in China's Cultural Revolution. Cambridge University Press. doi:10.1017/cbo9780511984754
- MacFarquhar, R., & Schoenhals, M. (2006). Mao's last revolution. Belknap Press of Harvard University Press.
- Teiwes, F. C., & Sun, W. (1996). The tragedy of Lin Biao: Riding the tiger during the Cultural Revolution, 1966–1971. Hurst.

== Foreign policy ==
- Chen, J. (1994). China's road to the Korean War: The making of the Sino-American confrontation. Columbia University Press.
- Chen, J. (2001). Mao's China and the Cold War. University of North Carolina Press.
- Cook, A. C. (Ed.). (2014). Mao's Little Red Book: A global history. Cambridge University Press. doi:10.1017/cbo9781107298576
- Lovell, J. (2019). Maoism: A global history. Bodley Head.
- Lüthi, L. M. (2008). The Sino-Soviet split: Cold War in the communist world. Princeton University Press.
- MacMillan, M. (2007). Nixon and Mao: The week that changed the world. Random House.
- Radchenko, S. (2009). Two suns in the heavens: The Sino-Soviet struggle for supremacy, 1962–1967. Woodrow Wilson Center Press; Stanford University Press.
- Sheng, M. M. (1997). Battling Western imperialism: Mao, Stalin, and the United States. Princeton University Press.
- Wolin, R. (2010). The wind from the East: French intellectuals, the Cultural Revolution, and the legacy of the 1960s. Princeton University Press. doi:10.1515/9781400834372
- Zhai, Q. (2000). China and the Vietnam wars, 1950–1975. University of North Carolina Press.

== Miscellaneous ==
- DeMare, B. (2019). Land wars: The story of China's agrarian revolution. Stanford University Press.
- Dikötter, F. (2013). The tragedy of liberation: A history of the Chinese revolution, 1945–1957. Bloomsbury.
- Gao, W. (2007). Zhou Enlai: The last perfect revolutionary: A biography (P. Rand & L. R. Sullivan, Trans.). PublicAffairs.
- Holm, D. (1991). Art and ideology in revolutionary China. Clarendon Press.
- Hung, C.-t. (2011). Mao's new world: Political culture in the early People's Republic. Cornell University Press.
- Kampen, T. (1989). Wang Jiaxiang, Mao Zedong and the "triumph of Mao Zedong-Thought" (1935–1945). Modern Asian Studies, 23(4), 705–727. doi:10.1017/s0026749x00010179
- Kampen, T. (2000). Mao Zedong, Zhou Enlai and the evolution of the Chinese communist leadership. Nordic Institute of Asian Studies.
- Salisbury, H. E. (1985). The Long March: The untold story. Harper & Row.
- Selden, M. (1995). China in revolution: The Yenan way revisited. M. E. Sharpe.
- Strauss, J. C. (2002). Paternalist terror: The campaign to suppress counterrevolutionaries and regime consolidation in the People's Republic of China, 1950–1953. Comparative Studies in Society and History, 44(1), 80–105. doi:10.1017/s001041750200004x
- Teiwes, F. C. (1990). Politics at Mao's court: Gao Gang and party factionalism in the early 1950s. M. E. Sharpe.
- Westad, O. A. (2003). Decisive encounters: The Chinese Civil War, 1946–1950. Stanford University Press.
- Yang, K. (2008). Reconsidering the campaign to suppress counterrevolutionaries. The China Quarterly, 193, 102–121. doi:10.1017/s0305741008000064

== Historiography and memory ==
=== Historiography ===
- Benton, G., & Lin, C. (Eds.). (2009). Was Mao really a monster? The academic response to Chang and Halliday's "Mao: The unknown story". Routledge.
- Gao, M. (2008). The battle for China's past: Mao and the Cultural Revolution. Pluto Press.
- Meisner, M. (1977). Mao and Marx in the scholastic tradition. Modern China, 3(4), 401–406. doi:10.1177/009770047700300404
- Pfeffer, R. M. (1976). Mao and Marx in the Marxist-Leninist tradition: A critique of "the China field" and a contribution to a preliminary reappraisal. Modern China, 2(4), 421–460. doi:10.1177/009770047600200402
- Schram, S. R. (1984). Mao studies: Retrospect and prospect. The China Quarterly, 97, 95–125. doi:10.1017/s0305741000008547
- Unger, J. (Ed.). (1993). Using the past to serve the present: Historiography and politics in contemporary China. M. E. Sharpe.
- Walder, A. G. (1977). Marxism, Maoism, and social change. Modern China, 3(1), 101–118. doi:10.1177/009770047700300104
- Walder, A. G. (1987). Actually existing Maoism. The Australian Journal of Chinese Affairs, 18, 155–166. JSTOR 2158588
- Weigelin-Schwiedrzik, S. (2006). In search of a master narrative for 20th-century Chinese history. The China Quarterly, 188, 1070–1091. doi:10.1017/s0305741006000555

=== Memory studies ===
- Barmé, G. R. (1996). Shades of Mao: The posthumous cult of the great leader. M. E. Sharpe.
- Dutton, M. (2004a). Mango Mao: Infections of the sacred. Public Culture, 16(2), 161–188. doi:10.1215/08992363-16-2-161
- Dutton, M. (2004b). The Mao industry. Current History, 103(674), 268–272. doi:10.1525/curh.2004.103.674.268
- Dutton, M. (2005). From culture industry to Mao industry: A Greek tragedy. boundary 2, 32(2), 151–167. doi:10.1215/01903659-32-2-151
- Hubbert, J. (2006). (Re)collecting Mao: Memory and fetish in contemporary China. American Ethnologist, 33(2), 145–161. doi:10.1525/ae.2006.33.2.145
- Li, J., & Zhang, E. (Eds.). (2016). Red legacies in China: Cultural afterlives of the communist revolution. Harvard University Asia Center.
- Li, S., & Yan, F. (2019). Searching for red songs: The politics of revolutionary nostalgia in contemporary China. The China Quarterly, 242, 508–528. doi:10.1017/s0305741019001103
- Schrift, M. (2001). Biography of a Chairman Mao badge: The creation and mass consumption of a personality cult. Rutgers University Press.
- Tu, H. (2022). Long live Chairman Mao! Death, resurrection, and the (un)making of a revolutionary relic. The Journal of Asian Studies, 81(3), 507–522. doi:10.1017/s0021911821002321

== Primary sources ==
Primary sources include Mao's writings, speeches and conversations in English translation, documentary collections, official publications of the Chinese Communist Party and foreign governments, and memoirs by people who worked with him.

- Ch'en, J. (Ed.). (1970). Mao papers: Anthology and bibliography. Oxford University Press.
- Mao, T. (1961). On guerrilla warfare (S. B. Griffith, Trans.). Praeger.
- Mao, T. (1961–1977). Selected works of Mao Tse-tung (Vols. 1–5). Foreign Languages Press.
- Mao, T. (1967). Quotations from Chairman Mao Tse-tung (S. R. Schram, Ed.). Praeger.
- Mao, T. (1974). Chairman Mao talks to the people: Talks and letters, 1956–1971 (S. Schram, Ed.; J. Chinnery & Tieyun, Trans.). Pantheon Books.
- Mao, T. (1977). A critique of Soviet economics (M. Roberts, Trans.). Monthly Review Press.
- Mao, Z. (1990). Mao Zedong on dialectical materialism: Writings on philosophy, 1937 (N. Knight, Ed.). M. E. Sharpe.
- Mao, Z. (1990). Report from Xunwu (R. R. Thompson, Trans.). Stanford University Press.
- Mao, Z. (1992). Mao's road to power: Revolutionary writings 1912–1949: Vol. 1. The pre-Marxist period, 1912–1920 (S. R. Schram, Ed.). M. E. Sharpe.
- Mao, Z. (1994). Mao's road to power: Revolutionary writings 1912–1949: Vol. 2. National revolution and social revolution, December 1920–June 1927 (S. R. Schram, Ed.). M. E. Sharpe.
- Mao, Z. (1995). Mao's road to power: Revolutionary writings 1912–1949: Vol. 3. From the Jinggangshan to the establishment of the Jiangxi soviets, July 1927–December 1930 (S. R. Schram, Ed.). M. E. Sharpe.
- Mao, Z. (1997). Mao's road to power: Revolutionary writings 1912–1949: Vol. 4. The rise and fall of the Chinese Soviet Republic, 1931–1934 (S. R. Schram, Ed.). M. E. Sharpe.
- Mao, Z. (1998). Mao Zedong on diplomacy. Foreign Languages Press.
- Mao, Z. (1999). Mao's road to power: Revolutionary writings 1912–1949: Vol. 5. Toward the second united front, January 1935–July 1937 (S. R. Schram, Ed.). M. E. Sharpe.
- Mao, Z. (2004). Mao's road to power: Revolutionary writings 1912–1949: Vol. 6. The new stage, August 1937–1938 (S. R. Schram, Ed.). M. E. Sharpe.
- Mao, Z. (2004). Mao's road to power: Revolutionary writings 1912–1949: Vol. 7. New democracy, 1939–1941 (S. R. Schram, Ed.). M. E. Sharpe.
- Schram, S. R. (1963). The political thought of Mao Tse-tung. Praeger.

=== Memoirs ===
- Braun, O. (1982). A Comintern agent in China, 1932–1939 (J. Moore, Trans.). Stanford University Press. (Original work published 1973)
- Chang, K. (1971–1972). The rise of the Chinese Communist Party: The autobiography of Chang Kuo-t'ao (Vols. 1–2). University Press of Kansas.
- Ji, C. (2008). The man on Mao's right: From Harvard Yard to Tiananmen Square, my life inside China's foreign ministry. Random House.
- Kissinger, H. (1979). White House years. Little, Brown.
- Kissinger, H. (2011). On China. Penguin Press.
- Li, Z. (1994). The private life of Chairman Mao: The memoirs of Mao's personal physician (H.-C. Tai, Trans.). Random House.
- Peng, D. (1984). Memoirs of a Chinese marshal: The autobiographical notes of Peng Dehuai (1898–1974) (L. Zheng, Trans.). Foreign Languages Press.
- Rittenberg, S., & Bennett, A. (1993). The man who stayed behind. Simon & Schuster.
- Snow, E. (1937). Red star over China. Gollancz.
- Witke, R. (1977). Comrade Chiang Ch'ing. Little, Brown.
- Xiao, Y. (1959). Mao Tse-tung and I were beggars. Syracuse University Press.
- Zhong, W. (Comp.). (1986). Mao Zedong: Biography, assessment, reminiscences. Foreign Languages Press.

=== Government documents ===
- Brandt, C., Schwartz, B. I., & Fairbank, J. K. (1952). A documentary history of Chinese communism. Harvard University Press.
- Burr, W. (Ed.). (1999). The Kissinger transcripts: The top secret talks with Beijing and Moscow. New Press.
- Communist China 1955–1959: Policy documents with analysis. (1962). Harvard University Press.
- Communist Party of China. (1981). Resolution on CPC history (1949–81). Foreign Languages Press.
- Kau, M. Y. M., & Leung, J. K. (Eds.). (1986–1992). The writings of Mao Zedong, 1949–1976 (Vols. 1–2). M. E. Sharpe.
- MacFarquhar, R., Cheek, T., & Wu, E. (Eds.). (1989). The secret speeches of Chairman Mao: From the Hundred Flowers to the Great Leap Forward. Council on East Asian Studies, Harvard University.
- Nickles, D. P. (Ed.). (2007). Foreign relations of the United States, 1969–1976: Vol. 18. China, 1973–1976. United States Government Printing Office.
- Phillips, S. E. (Ed.). (2006). Foreign relations of the United States, 1969–1976: Vol. 17. China, 1969–1972. United States Government Printing Office.
- Saich, T. (Ed.). (1996). The rise to power of the Chinese Communist Party: Documents and analysis. M. E. Sharpe.
- Schoenhals, M. (Ed.). (1996). China's Cultural Revolution, 1966–1969: Not a dinner party. M. E. Sharpe.

== See also ==
- Anti-Rightist Campaign
- Bibliography of Chinese history
- Bibliography of works by Mao Zedong
- Chairman Mao Memorial Hall
- Cultural Revolution
- Great Leap Forward
- History of China (1949–1976)
- Hundred Flowers Campaign
- Jiang Qing
- Lin Biao
- Long March
- Mao Zedong
- Mao Zedong's cult of personality
- Maoism
- Quotations from Chairman Mao Tse-tung
- Sino-Soviet split
- Zhou Enlai
