= Bibliography of China from Tiananmen to Xi Jinping =

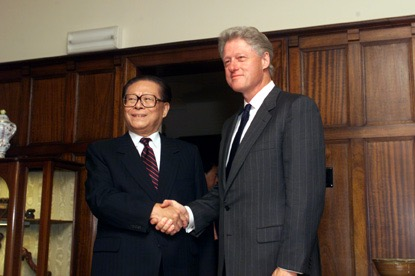
- Bill Clinton greets Jiang Zemin in Auckland, 1999
- Subject: History of China (1989–2002); History of China (2002–2012)
- Scope: Books, journal articles, primary sources
- Period covered: 1989 – 2012
- Languages: English
- Related: Bibliography of Chinese history; Bibliography of the Cold War

Bibliography of China from Tiananmen to Xi Jinping is a list of English-language books and scholarly articles on the history of the People's Republic of China from the 1989 Tiananmen Square protests to the leadership transition of 2012.

This bibliography contains academic-level English-language books (including translations) and journal articles. Book entries may have references to reviews published in academic journals or major newspapers when these could be considered helpful. These reference reviews also function as a resource to find other works on this subject.

Works listed here are cited in the notes or bibliographies of scholarly sources. Each is published by an academic or major trade press, written by a recognized expert, or substantially reviewed in scholarly journals; borderline cases are omitted. A selection of primary sources is included. Many of the books below carry their own bibliographies; see Further reading section for longer ones, and External links section for historical sites and museums.

Citations follow APA style. (Note: Entries are in plain text APA 7 format without templates; templates are used only for reviews and notes.) Books have citations to academic journal or mainstream published reviews when available. For books only partly about the subject, relevant chapter or section titles are given where useful and available. Translators of the original-language edition are included when possible. In cases where a title or name has appeared with more than one English spelling, the most recent published form is used and a footnote documents any earlier title under which the work appeared.

== General surveys ==
- Fewsmith, J. (2001). China since Tiananmen: The politics of transition. Cambridge University Press.
- Gilley, B. (2003). China's changing of the guard: The limits of authoritarian resilience. Journal of Democracy, 14(1), 18–26. doi:10.1353/jod.2003.0008
- Gries, P. H., & Rosen, S. (Eds.). (2004). State and society in 21st century China: Crisis, contention, and legitimation. Routledge.
- Link, P., Madsen, R. P., & Pickowicz, P. G. (Eds.). (2002). Popular China: Unofficial culture in a globalizing society. Rowman & Littlefield.
- McGregor, R. (2010). The Party: The secret world of China's communist rulers. Harper.
- Nathan, A. J. (2003). China's changing of the guard: Authoritarian resilience. Journal of Democracy, 14(1), 6–17. doi:10.1353/jod.2003.0019
- Nathan, A. J. (2009). China since Tiananmen: Authoritarian impermanence. Journal of Democracy, 20(3), 37–40. doi:10.1353/jod.0.0097
- Nathan, A. J., & Gilley, B. (2003). China's new rulers: The secret files (2nd rev. ed.). New York Review Books.
- Pei, M. (2006). China's trapped transition: The limits of developmental autocracy. Harvard University Press.
- Perry, E. J., & Selden, M. (Eds.). (2000). Chinese society: Change, conflict and resistance. Routledge.
- Shambaugh, D. (2008). China's Communist Party: Atrophy and adaptation. Woodrow Wilson Center Press; University of California Press.
- Shambaugh, D. (Ed.). (2000). Is China unstable? Assessing the factors. M. E. Sharpe.
- Shirk, S. L. (2007). China: Fragile superpower. Oxford University Press.
- Vogel, E. F. (2011). Deng Xiaoping and the transformation of China. Belknap Press of Harvard University Press.

== Domestic affairs ==
=== Repression ===
- Foot, R. (2000). Rights beyond borders: The global community and the struggle over human rights in China. Oxford University Press.
- Kent, A. (1999). China, the United Nations, and human rights: The limits of compliance. University of Pennsylvania Press.
- King, G., Pan, J., & Roberts, M. E. (2013). How censorship in China allows government criticism but silences collective expression. American Political Science Review, 107(2), 326–343. doi:10.1017/s0003055413000014
- MacKinnon, R. (2011). Liberation technology: China's "networked authoritarianism". Journal of Democracy, 22(2), 32–46. doi:10.1353/jod.2011.0033
- Sapio, F. (2010). Sovereign power and the law in China: Zones of exception in the criminal justice system. Brill.
- Seymour, J. D., & Anderson, R. (1998). New ghosts, old ghosts: Prisons and labor reform camps in China. M. E. Sharpe.
- Tanner, M. S. (2004). China rethinks unrest. The Washington Quarterly, 27(3), 137–156. doi:10.1162/016366004323090304
- Wang, Y., & Minzner, C. (2015). The rise of the Chinese security state. The China Quarterly, 222, 339–359. doi:10.1017/s0305741015000430

==== Democracy advocates ====
- Béja, J.-P. (2009). China since Tiananmen: The massacre's long shadow. Journal of Democracy, 20(3), 5–16. doi:10.1353/jod.0.0092
- Fu, H., & Cullen, R. (2008). Weiquan (rights protection) lawyering in an authoritarian state: Building a culture of public-interest lawyering. The China Journal, 59, 111–127. doi:10.1086/tcj.59.20066382
- Gilley, B. (2004). China's democratic future: How it will happen and where it will lead. Columbia University Press.
- Goldman, M. (2005). From comrade to citizen: The struggle for political rights in China. Harvard University Press.
- Liu, X. (2012). No enemies, no hatred: Selected essays and poems (P. Link, T. Martin-Liao, & X. Liu, Eds.). Harvard University Press.
- Pils, E. (2015). China's human rights lawyers: Advocacy and resistance. Routledge.
- Wei, J. (1997). The courage to stand alone: Letters from prison and other writings (K. M. Torgeson, Ed. & Trans.). Viking.
- Wright, T. (2002). The China Democracy Party and the politics of protest in the 1980s–1990s. The China Quarterly, 172, 906–926. doi:10.1017/s0009443902000554

=== Politics ===
- Brady, A.-M. (2008). Marketing dictatorship: Propaganda and thought work in contemporary China. Rowman & Littlefield.
- Brown, K. (2012). Hu Jintao: China's silent ruler. World Scientific.
- Chen, J., & Dickson, B. J. (2010). Allies of the state: China's private entrepreneurs and democratic change. Harvard University Press.
- Dickson, B. J. (2003). Red capitalists in China: The Party, private entrepreneurs, and prospects for political change. Cambridge University Press.
- Fewsmith, J. (2013). The logic and limits of political reform in China. Cambridge University Press.
- Garnaut, J. (2012). The rise and fall of the house of Bo. Penguin Books.
- Gilley, B. (1998). Tiger on the brink: Jiang Zemin and China's new elite. University of California Press.
- Heilmann, S., & Perry, E. J. (Eds.). (2011). Mao's invisible hand: The political foundations of adaptive governance in China. Harvard University Asia Center.
- Kuhn, R. L. (2005). The man who changed China: The life and legacy of Jiang Zemin. Crown.
- Lam, W. W.-L. (1999). The era of Jiang Zemin. Prentice Hall.
- Lam, W. W.-L. (2006). Chinese politics in the Hu Jintao era: New leaders, new challenges. M. E. Sharpe.
- Landry, P. F. (2008). Decentralized authoritarianism in China: The Communist Party's control of local elites in the post-Mao era. Cambridge University Press.
- Li, C. (2001). China's leaders: The new generation. Rowman & Littlefield.
- Mertha, A. (2009). "Fragmented authoritarianism 2.0": Political pluralization in the Chinese policy process. The China Quarterly, 200, 995–1012. doi:10.1017/s0305741009990592
- Mertha, A. C. (2008). China's water warriors: Citizen action and policy change. Cornell University Press.
- Peerenboom, R. (2002). China's long march toward rule of law. Cambridge University Press.
- Shih, V. C. (2008). Factions and finance in China: Elite conflict and inflation. Cambridge University Press.
- Shirk, S. L. (Ed.). (2011). Changing media, changing China. Oxford University Press.
- Stockmann, D. (2013). Media commercialization and authoritarian rule in China. Cambridge University Press.
- Tien, H.-m., & Chu, Y.-h. (Eds.). (2000). China under Jiang Zemin. Lynne Rienner.
- Tsai, K. S. (2007). Capitalism without democracy: The private sector in contemporary China. Cornell University Press.
- Wedeman, A. (2012). Double paradox: Rapid growth and rising corruption in China. Cornell University Press.
- Wright, T. (2010). Accepting authoritarianism: State-society relations in China's reform era. Stanford University Press.
- Yang, D. L. (2004). Remaking the Chinese leviathan: Market transition and the politics of governance in China. Stanford University Press.
- Yang, G. (2009). The power of the Internet in China: Citizen activism online. Columbia University Press.
- Zhao, S. (1993). Deng Xiaoping's Southern Tour: Elite politics in post-Tiananmen China. Asian Survey, 33(8), 739–756. JSTOR 2645086
- Zhao, S. (Ed.). (2006). Debating political reform in China: Rule of law vs. democratization. M. E. Sharpe.
- Zhao, Y. (2008). Communication in China: Political economy, power, and conflict. Rowman & Littlefield.

=== Religion ===
- Chau, A. Y. (2006). Miraculous response: Doing popular religion in contemporary China. Stanford University Press.
- Goossaert, V., & Palmer, D. A. (2011). The religious question in modern China. University of Chicago Press.
- Overmyer, D. L. (Ed.). (2003). Religion in China today. Cambridge University Press.
- Ownby, D. (2008). Falun Gong and the future of China. Oxford University Press.
- Palmer, D. A. (2007). Qigong fever: Body, science, and utopia in China. Columbia University Press.
- Potter, P. B. (2003). Belief in control: Regulation of religion in China. The China Quarterly, 174, 317–337. doi:10.1017/s0009443903000202
- Tong, J. (2002). Anatomy of regime repression in China: Timing, enforcement institutions, and target selection in banning the Falungong, July 1999. Asian Survey, 42(6), 795–820. doi:10.1525/as.2002.42.6.795
- Tong, J. W. (2009). Revenge of the Forbidden City: The suppression of the Falungong in China, 1999–2005. Oxford University Press.
- Yang, F. (2006). The red, black, and gray markets of religion in China. The Sociological Quarterly, 47(1), 93–122. doi:10.1111/j.1533-8525.2006.00039.x
- Yang, F. (2011). Religion in China: Survival and revival under communist rule. Oxford University Press.

==== Islam ====
- Gillette, M. B. (2000). Between Mecca and Beijing: Modernization and consumption among urban Chinese Muslims. Stanford University Press.
- Gladney, D. C. (2004). Dislocating China: Muslims, minorities, and other subaltern subjects. University of Chicago Press.
- Jaschok, M., & Shui, J. (2000). The history of women's mosques in Chinese Islam: A mosque of their own. Curzon.

==== Christianity ====
- Aikman, D. (2003). Jesus in Beijing: How Christianity is transforming China and changing the global balance of power. Regnery.
- Bays, D. H. (2012). A new history of Christianity in China. Wiley-Blackwell.
- Cao, N. (2010). Constructing China's Jerusalem: Christians, power, and place in contemporary Wenzhou. Stanford University Press.
- Hunter, A., & Chan, K.-K. (1993). Protestantism in contemporary China. Cambridge University Press.
- Kindopp, J., & Hamrin, C. L. (Eds.). (2004). God and Caesar in China: Policy implications of church-state tensions. Brookings Institution Press.
- Lian, X. (2010). Redeemed by fire: The rise of popular Christianity in modern China. Yale University Press.
- Madsen, R. (1998). China's Catholics: Tragedy and hope in an emerging civil society. University of California Press.

=== Economics ===
- Brandt, L., & Rawski, T. G. (Eds.). (2008). China's great economic transformation. Cambridge University Press.
- Chan, A. (2001). China's workers under assault: The exploitation of labor in a globalizing economy. M. E. Sharpe.
- Chang, G. G. (2001). The coming collapse of China. Random House.
- Gallagher, M. E. (2005). Contagious capitalism: Globalization and the politics of labor in China. Princeton University Press.
- Hsing, Y.-t. (2010). The great urban transformation: Politics of land and property in China. Oxford University Press.
- Huang, Y. (2008). Capitalism with Chinese characteristics: Entrepreneurship and the state. Cambridge University Press.
- Hurst, W. (2009). The Chinese worker after socialism. Cambridge University Press.
- Kennedy, S. (2005). The business of lobbying in China. Harvard University Press.
- Lardy, N. R. (1998). China's unfinished economic revolution. Brookings Institution Press.
- Lardy, N. R. (2002). Integrating China into the global economy. Brookings Institution Press.
- Lardy, N. R. (2012). Sustaining China's economic growth after the global financial crisis. Peterson Institute for International Economics.
- Lee, C. K. (2007). Against the law: Labor protests in China's rustbelt and sunbelt. University of California Press.
- Naughton, B. (2007). The Chinese economy: Transitions and growth. MIT Press.
- Pearson, M. M. (1997). China's new business elite: The political consequences of economic reform. University of California Press.
- Pun, N. (2005). Made in China: Women factory workers in a global workplace. Duke University Press.
- Steinfeld, E. S. (1998). Forging reform in China: The fate of state-owned industry. Cambridge University Press.
- Walter, C. E., & Howie, F. J. T. (2011). Red capitalism: The fragile financial foundation of China's extraordinary rise. Wiley.
- Wedeman, A. H. (2003). From Mao to market: Rent seeking, local protectionism, and marketization in China. Cambridge University Press.
- Zweig, D. (2002). Internationalizing China: Domestic interests and global linkages. Cornell University Press.

=== Rural society and agriculture ===
- Bernstein, T. P., & Lü, X. (2003). Taxation without representation in contemporary rural China. Cambridge University Press.
- Cai, Y. (2010). Collective resistance in China: Why popular protests succeed or fail. Stanford University Press.
- Chan, K. W., & Zhang, L. (1999). The hukou system and rural-urban migration in China: Processes and changes. The China Quarterly, 160, 818–855. doi:10.1017/s0305741000001351
- Chen, G., & Wu, C. (2006). Will the boat sink the water? The life of China's peasants (H. Zhu, Trans.). PublicAffairs.
- Economy, E. C. (2004). The river runs black: The environmental challenge to China's future. Cornell University Press.
- Fan, C. C. (2008). China on the move: Migration, the state, and the household. Routledge.
- Jacka, T. (2006). Rural women in urban China: Gender, migration, and social change. M. E. Sharpe.
- O'Brien, K. J., & Li, L. (2006). Rightful resistance in rural China. Cambridge University Press.
- Oi, J. C. (1999). Rural China takes off: Institutional foundations of economic reform. University of California Press.
- Solinger, D. J. (1999). Contesting citizenship in urban China: Peasant migrants, the state, and the logic of the market. University of California Press.
- Tsai, L. L. (2007). Accountability without democracy: Solidary groups and public goods provision in rural China. Cambridge University Press.
- Unger, J. (2002). The transformation of rural China. M. E. Sharpe.
- Zhang, L. (2001). Strangers in the city: Reconfigurations of space, power, and social networks within China's floating population. Stanford University Press.

=== Public health ===
- Huang, Y. (2013). Governing health in contemporary China. Routledge.
- Hyde, S. T. (2007). Eating spring rice: The cultural politics of AIDS in Southwest China. University of California Press.
- Kaufman, J., Kleinman, A., & Saich, T. (Eds.). (2006). AIDS and social policy in China. Harvard University Asia Center.
- Kleinman, A., & Watson, J. L. (Eds.). (2005). SARS in China: Prelude to pandemic? Stanford University Press.

== Regions ==
=== Xinjiang and the Uyghurs ===
- Becquelin, N. (2004). Staged development in Xinjiang. The China Quarterly, 178, 358–378. doi:10.1017/s0305741004000219
- Bellér-Hann, I., Cesàro, M. C., Harris, R., & Smith Finley, J. (Eds.). (2007). Situating the Uyghurs between China and Central Asia. Ashgate.
- Bovingdon, G. (2010). The Uyghurs: Strangers in their own land. Columbia University Press.
- Clarke, M. E. (2011). Xinjiang and China's rise in Central Asia: A history. Routledge.
- Dautcher, J. (2009). Down a narrow road: Identity and masculinity in a Uyghur community in Xinjiang China. Harvard University Asia Center.
- Dillon, M. (2003). Xinjiang: China's Muslim far northwest. RoutledgeCurzon.
- Millward, J. A. (2004). Violent separatism in Xinjiang: A critical assessment. East-West Center Washington.
- Millward, J. A. (2007). Eurasian crossroads: A history of Xinjiang. Columbia University Press.
- Rudelson, J. J. (1998). Oasis identities: Uyghur nationalism along China's Silk Road. Columbia University Press.
- Smith Finley, J. (2013). The art of symbolic resistance: Uyghur identities and Uyghur–Han relations in contemporary Xinjiang. Brill.
- Starr, S. F. (Ed.). (2004). Xinjiang: China's Muslim borderland. M. E. Sharpe.

=== Hong Kong ===
- Brown, J. M., & Foot, R. (Eds.). (1997). Hong Kong's transitions, 1842–1997. St. Martin's Press.
- Carroll, J. M. (2007). A concise history of Hong Kong. Rowman & Littlefield.
- Chan, M. K. (Ed.). (1997). The challenge of Hong Kong's reintegration with China. Hong Kong University Press.
- Dimbleby, J. (1997). The last governor: Chris Patten and the handover of Hong Kong. Little, Brown.
- Fu, H., Petersen, C. J., & Young, S. N. M. (Eds.). (2005). National security and fundamental freedoms: Hong Kong's Article 23 under scrutiny. Hong Kong University Press.
- Ma, N. (2007). Political development in Hong Kong: State, political society, and civil society. Hong Kong University Press.
- Mathews, G., Ma, E. K.-W., & Lui, T.-l. (2008). Hong Kong, China: Learning to belong to a nation. Routledge.
- Patten, C. (1999). East and West: China, power, and the future of Asia. Times Books.
- Sing, M. (2004). Hong Kong's tortuous democratization: A comparative analysis. RoutledgeCurzon.
- So, A. Y. (1999). Hong Kong's embattled democracy: A societal analysis. Johns Hopkins University Press.
- Tsang, S. (1997). Hong Kong: An appointment with China. I.B. Tauris.
- Tsang, S. (2007). A modern history of Hong Kong. I. B. Tauris.

=== Macao ===
- Clayton, C. H. (2009). Sovereignty at the edge: Macau and the question of Chineseness. Harvard University Asia Center.
- Hao, Z. (2011). Macau history and society. Hong Kong University Press.
- Lo, S. S.-H. (2007). One formula, two experiences: Political divergence of Hong Kong and Macao since retrocession. Journal of Contemporary China, 16(52), 359–387. doi:10.1080/10670560701314214
- Lo, S. S.-H. (2008). Political change in Macao. Routledge.
- Yee, H. S. (2001). Macau in transition: From colony to autonomous region. Palgrave.

=== Tibet ===
- Barnett, R. (2006). Lhasa: Streets with memories. Columbia University Press.
- Barnett, R., & Akiner, S. (Eds.). (1994). Resistance and reform in Tibet. Hurst.
- Fischer, A. M. (2005). State growth and social exclusion in Tibet. Nordic Institute of Asian Studies.
- Goldstein, M. C. (1997). The snow lion and the dragon: China, Tibet, and the Dalai Lama. University of California Press.
- Goldstein, M. C., & Kapstein, M. T. (Eds.). (1998). Buddhism in contemporary Tibet: Religious revival and cultural identity. University of California Press.
- Sautman, B., & Dreyer, J. T. (Eds.). (2006). Contemporary Tibet: Politics, development, and society in a disputed region. M. E. Sharpe.
- Shakya, T. (1999). The dragon in the land of snows: A history of modern Tibet since 1947. Columbia University Press.
- Smith, W. W. (2010). Tibet's last stand? The Tibetan uprising of 2008 and China's response. Rowman & Littlefield.
- Yeh, E. T. (2013). Taming Tibet: Landscape transformation and the gift of Chinese development. Cornell University Press.

== Foreign policy ==
- Christensen, T. J. (2001). Posing problems without catching up: China's rise and challenges for U.S. security policy. International Security, 25(4), 5–40. doi:10.1162/01622880151091880
- Deng, Y. (2008). China's struggle for status: The realignment of international relations. Cambridge University Press.
- Fravel, M. T. (2008). Strong borders, secure nation: Cooperation and conflict in China's territorial disputes. Princeton University Press.
- Gill, B. (2007). Rising star: China's new security diplomacy. Brookings Institution Press.
- Goldstein, A. (2005). Rising to the challenge: China's grand strategy and international security. Stanford University Press.
- Gries, P. H. (2004). China's new nationalism: Pride, politics, and diplomacy. University of California Press.
- Johnston, A. I. (2008). Social states: China in international institutions, 1980–2000. Princeton University Press.
- Kissinger, H. (2011). On China. Penguin Press.
- Kurlantzick, J. (2007). Charm offensive: How China's soft power is transforming the world. Yale University Press.
- Medeiros, E. S., & Fravel, M. T. (2003). China's new diplomacy. Foreign Affairs, 82(6), 22. JSTOR 20033754
- Nathan, A. J., & Ross, R. S. (1997). The Great Wall and the empty fortress: China's search for security. W. W. Norton.
- Nathan, A. J., & Scobell, A. (2012). China's search for security. Columbia University Press.
- Shambaugh, D. (2003). Modernizing China's military: Progress, problems, and prospects. University of California Press.
- Shambaugh, D. (2013). China goes global: The partial power. Oxford University Press.
- Shambaugh, D. (Ed.). (2005). Power shift: China and Asia's new dynamics. University of California Press.
- Weiss, J. C. (2014). Powerful patriots: Nationalist protest in China's foreign relations. Oxford University Press.
- Zhao, S. (2004). A nation-state by construction: Dynamics of modern Chinese nationalism. Stanford University Press.

=== United States ===
- Christensen, T. J. (2006). Fostering stability or creating a monster? The rise of China and U.S. policy toward East Asia. International Security, 31(1), 81–126. doi:10.1162/isec.2006.31.1.81
- Fewsmith, J. (2001). The political and social implications of China's accession to the WTO. The China Quarterly, 167, 573–591. doi:10.1017/S0009443901000328
- Foot, R., & Walter, A. (2010). China, the United States, and global order. Cambridge University Press.
- Friedberg, A. L. (2011). A contest for supremacy: China, America, and the struggle for mastery in Asia. W. W. Norton.
- Garrison, J. A. (2005). Making China policy: From Nixon to G. W. Bush. Lynne Rienner.
- Gries, P. H. (2001). Tears of rage: Chinese nationalist reactions to the Belgrade embassy bombing. The China Journal, 46, 25–43. JSTOR 3182306
- Harding, H. (1992). A fragile relationship: The United States and China since 1972. Brookings Institution.
- Lampton, D. M. (2001). Same bed, different dreams: Managing U.S.-China relations, 1989–2000. University of California Press.
- Mann, J. (1999). About face: A history of America's curious relationship with China, from Nixon to Clinton. Knopf.
- Mann, J. (2007). The China fantasy: How our leaders explain away Chinese repression. Viking.
- Medeiros, E. S. (2005). Strategic hedging and the future of Asia-Pacific stability. The Washington Quarterly, 29(1), 145–167. doi:10.1162/016366005774859724
- Myers, R. H., Oksenberg, M., & Shambaugh, D. (Eds.). (2001). Making China policy: Lessons from the Bush and Clinton administrations. Rowman & Littlefield.
- Ross, R. S., & Zhu, F. (Eds.). (2008). China's ascent: Power, security, and the future of international politics. Cornell University Press.
- Shambaugh, D. (Ed.). (2012). Tangled titans: The United States and China. Rowman & Littlefield.
- Suettinger, R. L. (2003). Beyond Tiananmen: The politics of U.S.-China relations, 1989–2000. Brookings Institution Press.
- Sutter, R. G. (2013). U.S.-Chinese relations: Perilous past, pragmatic present (2nd ed.). Rowman & Littlefield.
- Tyler, P. (1999). A great wall: Six presidents and China: An investigative history. PublicAffairs.
- Wang, J., & Lieberthal, K. G. (2012). Addressing U.S.-China strategic distrust. John L. Thornton China Center at Brookings.
- Zhao, S. (Ed.). (2007). China–US relations transformed: Perspectives and strategic interactions. Routledge.

=== Russia ===
- Bellacqua, J. (Ed.). (2010). The future of China–Russia relations. University Press of Kentucky.
- Garnett, S. W. (Ed.). (2000). Rapprochement or rivalry? Russia–China relations in a changing Asia. Carnegie Endowment for International Peace.
- Kuhrt, N. (2007). Russian policy towards China and Japan: The El'tsin and Putin periods. Routledge.
- Lo, B. (2008). Axis of convenience: Moscow, Beijing, and the new geopolitics. Brookings Institution Press.
- Lukin, A. (2003). The bear watches the dragon: Russia's perceptions of China and the evolution of Russian-Chinese relations since the eighteenth century. M. E. Sharpe.
- Wilson, J. L. (2004). Strategic partners: Russian-Chinese relations in the post-Soviet era. M. E. Sharpe.
- Wishnick, E. (2001). Mending fences: The evolution of Moscow's China policy from Brezhnev to Yeltsin. University of Washington Press.

=== Europe ===
- Casarini, N. (2009). Remaking global order: The evolution of Europe-China relations and its implications for East Asia and the United States. Oxford University Press.
- Crossick, S., & Reuter, E. (Eds.). (2007). China-EU: A common future. World Scientific.
- Fox, J., & Godement, F. (2009). A power audit of EU-China relations. European Council on Foreign Relations.
- Kerr, D., & Liu, F. (Eds.). (2007). The international politics of EU-China relations. British Academy.
- Pan, Z. (Ed.). (2012). Conceptual gaps in China-EU relations. Palgrave Macmillan.
- Ross, R. S., Tunsjø, Ø., & Zhang, T. (Eds.). (2010). US-China-EU relations: Managing the new world order. Routledge.
- Shambaugh, D. (2004). China and Europe: The emerging axis. Current History, 103(674), 243–248. doi:10.1525/curh.2004.103.674.243
- Shambaugh, D., Sandschneider, E., & Zhou, H. (Eds.). (2007). China-Europe relations: Perceptions, policies and prospects. Routledge.

=== Latin America ===
- Armony, A. C., & Strauss, J. C. (2012). From going out (zou chuqu) to arriving in (desembarco): Constructing a new field of inquiry in China–Latin America interactions. The China Quarterly, 209, 1–17. doi:10.1017/s0305741011001457
- Ellis, R. E. (2009). China in Latin America: The whats and wherefores. Lynne Rienner.
- Fernández Jilberto, A. E., & Hogenboom, B. (Eds.). (2010). Latin America facing China: South–South relations beyond the Washington Consensus. Berghahn Books.
- Gallagher, K. P., & Porzecanski, R. (2010). The dragon in the room: China and the future of Latin American industrialization. Stanford University Press.
- Hearn, A. H., & León-Manríquez, J. L. (Eds.). (2011). China engages Latin America: Tracing the trajectory. Lynne Rienner.
- Roett, R., & Paz, G. (Eds.). (2008). China's expansion into the Western Hemisphere: Implications for Latin America and the United States. Brookings Institution Press.

=== Africa ===
- Alden, C. (2007). China in Africa. Zed Books.
- Alden, C., Large, D., & Soares de Oliveira, R. (Eds.). (2008). China returns to Africa: A rising power and a continent embrace. Hurst.
- Brautigam, D. (2009). The dragon's gift: The real story of China in Africa. Oxford University Press.
- Large, D. (2008). Beyond 'dragon in the bush': The study of China–Africa relations. African Affairs, 107(426), 45–61. doi:10.1093/afraf/adm069
- Large, D., & Patey, L. A. (Eds.). (2011). Sudan looks East: China, India and the politics of Asian alternatives. James Currey.
- Rotberg, R. I. (Ed.). (2008). China into Africa: Trade, aid, and influence. Brookings Institution Press.
- Taylor, I. (2006). China and Africa: Engagement and compromise. Routledge.
- Taylor, I. (2009). China's new role in Africa. Lynne Rienner.

=== Taiwan ===
- Bush, R. C. (2004). At cross purposes: U.S.-Taiwan relations since 1942. M. E. Sharpe.
- Bush, R. C. (2005). Untying the knot: Making peace in the Taiwan Strait. Brookings Institution Press.
- Bush, R. C. (2013). Uncharted strait: The future of China-Taiwan relations. Brookings Institution Press.
- Carpenter, T. G. (2005). America's coming war with China: A collision course over Taiwan. Palgrave Macmillan.
- Christensen, T. J. (2002). The contemporary security dilemma: Deterring a Taiwan conflict. The Washington Quarterly, 25(4), 5–21. doi:10.1162/016366002760252509
- Chu, Y.-h. (2004). Taiwan's national identity politics and the prospect of cross-strait relations. Asian Survey, 44(4), 484–512. doi:10.1525/as.2004.44.4.484
- Clough, R. N. (1999). Cooperation or conflict in the Taiwan Strait? Rowman & Littlefield.
- Garver, J. W. (1997). Face off: China, the United States, and Taiwan's democratization. University of Washington Press.
- Hickey, D. V. V. (2007). Foreign policy making in Taiwan: From principle to pragmatism. Routledge.
- Kastner, S. L. (2009). Political conflict and economic interdependence across the Taiwan Strait and beyond. Stanford University Press.
- Lin, S. S. (2016). Taiwan's China dilemma: Contested identities and multiple interests in Taiwan's cross-strait economic policy. Stanford University Press.
- Rigger, S. (1999). Politics in Taiwan: Voting for democracy. Routledge.
- Rigger, S. (2011). Why Taiwan matters: Small island, global powerhouse. Rowman & Littlefield.
- Ross, R. S. (2000). The 1995–96 Taiwan Strait confrontation: Coercion, credibility, and the use of force. International Security, 25(2), 87–123. doi:10.1162/016228800560462
- Ross, R. S. (2002). Navigating the Taiwan Strait: Deterrence, escalation dominance, and U.S.-China relations. International Security, 27(2), 48–85. doi:10.1162/016228802760987824
- Roy, D. (2003). Taiwan: A political history. Cornell University Press.
- Scobell, A. (2000). Show of force: Chinese soldiers, statesmen, and the 1995–1996 Taiwan Strait crisis. Political Science Quarterly, 115(2), 227–246. JSTOR 2657901
- Sheng, L. (2001). China's dilemma: The Taiwan issue. Institute of Southeast Asian Studies.
- Tucker, N. B. (2008). Strait talk: United States-Taiwan relations and the crisis with China. Harvard University Press.
- Tucker, N. B. (Ed.). (2005). Dangerous strait: The U.S.-Taiwan-China crisis. Columbia University Press.
- Wachman, A. M. (2007). Why Taiwan? Geostrategic rationales for China's territorial integrity. Stanford University Press.
- Zhao, S. (Ed.). (1999). Across the Taiwan Strait: Mainland China, Taiwan, and the 1995–1996 crisis. Routledge.

== Beijing Olympics ==
- Brady, A.-M. (2009). The Beijing Olympics as a campaign of mass distraction. The China Quarterly, 197, 1–24. doi:10.1017/s0305741009000058
- Brownell, S. (2008). Beijing's games: What the Olympics mean to China. Rowman & Littlefield.
- Cha, V. D. (2009). Beyond the final score: The politics of sport in Asia. Columbia University Press.
- Price, M. E., & Dayan, D. (Eds.). (2008). Owning the Olympics: Narratives of the new China. University of Michigan Press.
- Xu, G. (2008). Olympic dreams: China and sports, 1895–2008. Harvard University Press.

== Historiography and memory ==
=== Historiography ===
- Carlson, A., Gallagher, M. E., Lieberthal, K., & Manion, M. (Eds.). (2010). Contemporary Chinese politics: New sources, methods, and field strategies. Cambridge University Press.
- Heimer, M., & Thøgersen, S. (Eds.). (2006). Doing fieldwork in China. University of Hawaii Press.
- O'Brien, K. J. (2011). Studying Chinese politics in an age of specialization. Journal of Contemporary China, 20(71), 535–541. doi:10.1080/10670564.2011.587157
- Perry, E. J. (2007). Studying Chinese politics: Farewell to revolution? The China Journal, 57, 1–22. doi:10.1086/tcj.57.20066239
- Shambaugh, D. (Ed.). (1993). American studies of contemporary China. Woodrow Wilson Center Press; M. E. Sharpe.
- Unger, J. (Ed.). (1993). Using the past to serve the present: Historiography and politics in contemporary China. M. E. Sharpe.
- Weigelin-Schwiedrzik, S. (2006). In search of a master narrative for 20th-century Chinese history. The China Quarterly, 188, 1070–1091. doi:10.1017/s0305741006000555

=== Memory studies ===
- Barmé, G. R. (1999). In the red: On contemporary Chinese culture. Columbia University Press.
- Callahan, W. A. (2010). China: The pessoptimist nation. Oxford University Press.
- Coble, P. M. (2007). China's "new remembering" of the Anti-Japanese War of Resistance, 1937–1945. The China Quarterly, 190, 394–410. doi:10.1017/s0305741007001257
- Lee, C. K., & Yang, G. (Eds.). (2007). Re-envisioning the Chinese revolution: The politics and poetics of collective memory in reform China. Woodrow Wilson Center Press; Stanford University Press.
- Lim, L. (2014). The People's Republic of amnesia: Tiananmen revisited. Oxford University Press.
- Mitter, R. (2000). Behind the scenes at the museum: Nationalism, history and memory in the Beijing War of Resistance Museum, 1987–1997. The China Quarterly, 161, 279–293. doi:10.1017/s0305741000004033
- Wang, Z. (2012). Never forget national humiliation: Historical memory in Chinese politics and foreign relations. Columbia University Press.
- Zhao, S. (1998). A state-led nationalism: The patriotic education campaign in post-Tiananmen China. Communist and Post-Communist Studies, 31(3), 287–302. doi:10.1016/s0967-067x(98)00009-9

== Primary sources ==
Primary sources include writings and speeches of party leaders, documentary collections, official publications of the government and the Chinese Communist Party, and memoirs.

- Benton, G., & Hunter, A. (Eds.). (1995). Wild lily, prairie fire: China's road to democracy, Yan'an to Tian'anmen, 1942–1989. Princeton University Press.
- Deng, X. (1994). Selected works of Deng Xiaoping, 1982–1992. Foreign Languages Press.
- Han, M. (Ed.). (1990). Cries for democracy: Writings and speeches from the Chinese democracy movement. Princeton University Press.
- Jiang, Z. (2002). Jiang Zemin on the "three represents". Foreign Languages Press.
- Jiang, Z. (2010–2013). Selected works of Jiang Zemin. Foreign Languages Press.
- Liu, B. (1990). China's crisis, China's hope: Essays from an intellectual in exile. Harvard University Press.
- Mok, C. Y., & Harrison, J. F. (Eds.). (1990). Voices from Tiananmen Square: Beijing spring and the democracy movement. Black Rose Books.
- Oksenberg, M., Sullivan, L. R., & Lambert, M. (Eds.). (1990). Beijing spring, 1989: Confrontation and conflict: The basic documents. M. E. Sharpe.
- Zhang, L. (Comp.), Nathan, A. J., & Link, P. (Eds.). (2001). The Tiananmen papers. PublicAffairs.
- Zhu, R. (2015). Zhu Rongji on the record: The road to reform, 1998–2003. Brookings Institution Press.
- Zhu, R. (2018). Zhu Rongji on the record: The Shanghai years, 1987–1991. Brookings Institution Press.

=== Government documents ===
- Consultative Committee for the Basic Law of the Hong Kong Special Administrative Region. (1990). The basic law of the Hong Kong Special Administrative Region of the People's Republic of China.
- Hu, J. (2009). Hold high the great banner of socialism with Chinese characteristics and strive for new victories in building a moderately prosperous society in all respects: Report to the Seventeenth National Congress of the Communist Party of China on October 15, 2007. Foreign Languages Press.
- Information Office of the State Council of the People's Republic of China. (1991). Human rights in China. Foreign Languages Press.
- Information Office of the State Council of the People's Republic of China. (1992). Tibet: Its ownership and human rights situation.
- Information Office of the State Council of the People's Republic of China. (1998). China's national defense.
- Information Office of the State Council of the People's Republic of China. (2000). China's national defense in 2000.
- Taiwan Affairs Office & Information Office of the State Council. (2000). The one-China principle and the Taiwan issue.
- Taiwan Affairs Office. (1993). The Taiwan question and reunification of China.

=== Memoirs ===
- Chai, L. (2011). A heart for freedom: The remarkable journey of a young dissident, her daring escape, and her quest to free China's daughters. Tyndale House.
- Jiang, Q. (2012). My life in prison: Memoirs of a Chinese political dissident (N. May, Ed.; J. Dew, Trans.). Rowman & Littlefield.
- Kadeer, R., & Cavelius, A. (2009). Dragon fighter: One woman's epic struggle for peace with China. Kales Press.
- Lilley, J. R., & Lilley, J. (2004). China hands: Nine decades of adventure, espionage, and diplomacy in Asia. PublicAffairs.
- Qian, Q. (2005). Ten episodes in China's diplomacy. HarperCollins.
- Shen, T., & Yen, M. (1990). Almost a revolution. Houghton Mifflin.
- Wong, J. (1996). Red China blues: My long march from Mao to now. Doubleday.
- Zhao, Z. (2009). Prisoner of the state: The secret journal of Premier Zhao Ziyang. Simon & Schuster.

== See also ==
- 1989 Tiananmen Square protests and massacre
- 2008 Summer Olympics
- Bibliography of Chinese history
- Bibliography of the Cold War
- Charter 08
- China and the World Trade Organization
- China's peaceful rise
- Deng Xiaoping's southern tour
- Handover of Hong Kong
- History of China (1989–2002)
- History of China (2002–2012)
- Hu Jintao
- Human rights in China
- Jiang Zemin
- Persecution of Falun Gong
- Scientific Outlook on Development
- Three Represents
- Weiquan movement
