= Bibliography of Chiang Kai-shek =

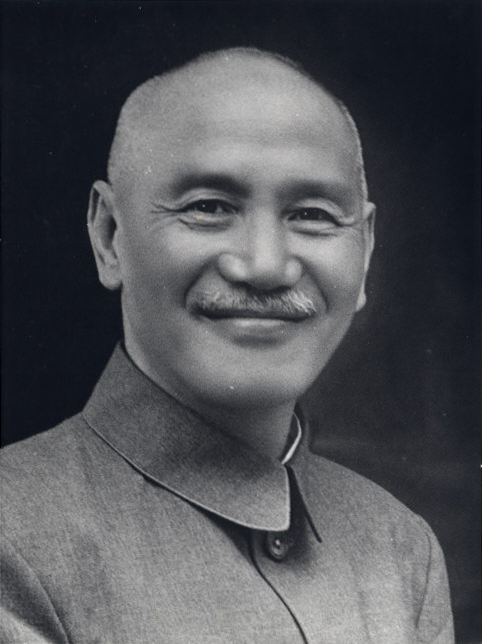
- Official portrait, 1955
- Subject: Chiang Kai-shek
- Scope: Books, journal articles, primary sources
- Period covered: 1887 – 1975
- Languages: English
- Related: Bibliography of Chinese history; Bibliography of the Cold War

This is a select bibliography of academic-level books and journal articles, published mainly after World War II, (Note: Works published during or before World War II should be limited to areas where there are no significant post-World War II books on the subject or when the work in question has significant historical merit.) about Chiang Kai-shek and the historical context of his life and work.

Works listed here are cited in the notes or bibliographies of scholarly sources. Each is published by an academic or major trade press, written by a recognized expert, or substantially reviewed in scholarly journals; borderline cases are omitted. A selection of primary sources is included. Many of the books below carry their own bibliographies; see Further reading section for longer ones, and External links section for historical sites and museums.

Citations follow APA style. (Note: Entries are in plain text APA 7 format without templates; templates are used only for reviews and notes.) Books have citations to academic journal or mainstream published reviews when available. For books only partly about the subject, relevant chapter or section titles are given where useful and available. Translators of the original-language edition are included when possible. In cases where a title or name has appeared with more than one English spelling, the most recent published form is used and a footnote documents any earlier title under which the work appeared.

== Biographies ==
- Crozier, B., & Chou, E. (1976). The man who lost China: The first full biography of Chiang Kai-shek. Scribner.
- Fenby, J. (2004). Chiang Kai-shek: China's Generalissimo and the nation he lost. Carroll & Graf.
- Furuya, K. (1981). Chiang Kai-shek: His life and times (C.-m. Chang, Abr. & Trans.). St. John's University.
- Hill, E. M. (Ed.). (2025). Chiang Kai-shek's critical years, 1935–50. University of British Columbia Press. doi:10.59962/9780774870290
- Li, L. T. (2006). Madame Chiang Kai-shek: China's eternal first lady. Atlantic Monthly Press.
- Loh, P. P. Y. (1971). The early Chiang Kai-shek: A study of his personality and politics, 1887–1924. Columbia University Press.
- Pakula, H. (2009). The last empress: Madame Chiang Kai-shek and the birth of modern China. Simon & Schuster.
- Pantsov, A. V. (2023). Victorious in defeat: The life and times of Chiang Kai-shek, China, 1887–1975. Yale University Press.
- Taylor, J. (2000). The Generalissimo's son: Chiang Ching-kuo and the revolutions in China and Taiwan. Harvard University Press.
- Taylor, J. (2009). The Generalissimo: Chiang Kai-shek and the struggle for modern China. Belknap Press of Harvard University Press.

== Nationalist Revolution and the Nanjing decade ==
- Clinton, M. (2017). Revolutionary nativism: Fascism and culture in China, 1925–1937. Duke University Press. doi:10.1215/9780822373032
- Coble, P. M., Jr. (1980). The Shanghai capitalists and the Nationalist government, 1927–1937. Council on East Asian Studies, Harvard University.
- Coble, P. M. (1991). Facing Japan: Chinese politics and Japanese imperialism, 1931–1937. Council on East Asian Studies, Harvard University.
- Dirlik, A. (1975). The ideological foundations of the New Life Movement: A study in counterrevolution. The Journal of Asian Studies, 34(4), 945–980. JSTOR 2054509
- Eastman, L. E. (1972). Fascism in Kuomintang China: The Blue Shirts. The China Quarterly, 49, 1–31. doi:10.1017/s0305741000036481
- Eastman, L. E. (1974). The abortive revolution: China under Nationalist rule, 1927–1937. Harvard University Press.
- Eastman, L. E., Ch'en, J., Pepper, S., & Van Slyke, L. P. (1991). The Nationalist era in China, 1927–1949. Cambridge University Press. doi:10.1017/cbo9780511572838
- Ferlanti, F. (2010). The New Life Movement in Jiangxi Province, 1934–1938. Modern Asian Studies, 44(5), 961–1000. doi:10.1017/s0026749x0999028x
- Fitzgerald, J. (1996). Awakening China: Politics, culture, and class in the Nationalist Revolution. Stanford University Press.
- Jacobs, D. N. (1981). Borodin: Stalin's man in China. Harvard University Press.
- Jordan, D. A. (1976). The Northern Expedition: China's National Revolution of 1926–1928. University Press of Hawaii.
- Kirby, W. C. (1984). Germany and Republican China. Stanford University Press.
- Martin, B. G. (1996). The Shanghai Green Gang: Politics and organized crime, 1919–1937. University of California Press.
- Strauss, J. C. (1998). Strong institutions in weak polities: State building in Republican China, 1927–1940. Clarendon Press.
- Tien, H.-m. (1972). Government and politics in Kuomintang China, 1927–1937. Stanford University Press.
- Wakeman, F., Jr. (1997). A revisionist view of the Nanjing decade: Confucian fascism. The China Quarterly, 150, 395–432. doi:10.1017/s030574100005253x
- Wakeman, F., Jr. (2003). Spymaster: Dai Li and the Chinese secret service. University of California Press.
- Wilbur, C. M. (1984). The Nationalist Revolution in China, 1923–1928. Cambridge University Press.
- Wilbur, C. M., & How, J. L.-y. (1989). Missionaries of revolution: Soviet advisers and Nationalist China, 1920–1927. Harvard University Press.
- Wu, T.-w. (1976). The Sian Incident: A pivotal point in modern Chinese history. Center for Chinese Studies, University of Michigan.
- Zhou, X. (2026). Which fascism? Historicizing Chiang Kai-shek's engagements with the idea during the Nanjing decade, 1927–37. Modern Asian Studies, 60(1), 139–168. doi:10.1017/s0026749x26101802

== Military history ==
- Ch'i, H.-s. (1982). Nationalist China at war: Military defeats and political collapse, 1937–45. University of Michigan Press.
- Eastman, L. E. (1984). Seeds of destruction: Nationalist China in war and revolution, 1937–1949. Stanford University Press.
- Harmsen, P. (2013). Shanghai 1937: Stalingrad on the Yangtze. Casemate.
- Lary, D. (2010). The Chinese people at war: Human suffering and social transformation, 1937–1945. Cambridge University Press. doi:10.1017/cbo9780511761898
- Lary, D. (2015). China's civil war: A social history, 1945–1949. Cambridge University Press.
- Levine, S. I. (1987). Anvil of victory: The communist revolution in Manchuria, 1945–1948. Columbia University Press.
- Mitter, R. (2013). Forgotten ally: China's World War II, 1937–1945. Houghton Mifflin Harcourt.
- Paine, S. C. M. (2012). The wars for Asia, 1911–1949. Cambridge University Press. doi:10.1017/cbo9781139105835
- Peattie, M., Drea, E., & van de Ven, H. (Eds.). (2011). The battle for China: Essays on the military history of the Sino-Japanese War of 1937–1945. Stanford University Press.
- Pepper, S. (1978). Civil war in China: The political struggle, 1945–1949. University of California Press.
- Tanner, H. M. (2013). The battle for Manchuria and the fate of China: Siping, 1946. Indiana University Press.
- Tanner, H. M. (2015). Where Chiang Kai-shek lost China: The Liao-Shen campaign, 1948. Indiana University Press.
- Tuchman, B. W. (1971). Stilwell and the American experience in China, 1911–45. Macmillan.
- van de Ven, H. J. (2003). War and nationalism in China, 1925–1945. RoutledgeCurzon.
- van de Ven, H. J. (2018). China at war: Triumph and tragedy in the emergence of the new China. Harvard University Press.
- Westad, O. A. (2003). Decisive encounters: The Chinese Civil War, 1946–1950. Stanford University Press.

== Foreign relations ==
- Feis, H. (1953). The China tangle: The American effort in China from Pearl Harbor to the Marshall mission. Princeton University Press.
- Garver, J. W. (1988). Chinese-Soviet relations, 1937–1945: The diplomacy of Chinese nationalism. Oxford University Press.
- Garver, J. W. (1997). The Sino-American alliance: Nationalist China and American Cold War strategy in Asia. M. E. Sharpe.
- Schaller, M. (1979). The U.S. crusade in China, 1938–1945. Columbia University Press.
- Tsou, T. (1963). America's failure in China, 1941–50. University of Chicago Press.
- Tucker, N. B. (1983). Patterns in the dust: Chinese-American relations and the recognition controversy, 1949–1950. Columbia University Press.

== Taiwan ==
- Accinelli, R. (1996). Crisis and commitment: United States policy toward Taiwan, 1950–1955. University of North Carolina Press.
- Kerr, G. H. (1965). Formosa betrayed. Houghton Mifflin.
- Lai, T.-h., Myers, R. H., & Wei, W. (1991). A tragic beginning: The Taiwan uprising of February 28, 1947. Stanford University Press.
- Lin, H.-t. (2016). Accidental state: Chiang Kai-shek, the United States, and the making of Taiwan. Harvard University Press.
- Lin, H.-t. (2022). Taiwan, the United States, and the hidden history of the Cold War in Asia: Divided allies. Routledge. doi:10.4324/9781003229544
- Phillips, S. E. (2003). Between assimilation and independence: The Taiwanese encounter Nationalist China, 1945–1950. Stanford University Press.
- Roy, D. (2003). Taiwan: A political history. Cornell University Press.
- Taylor, J. E. (2010). QuJianghua: Disposing of and re-appraising the remnants of Chiang Kai-shek's reign on Taiwan. Journal of Contemporary History, 45(1), 181–196. doi:10.1177/0022009409348030
- Tsang, S. (Ed.). (1993). In the shadow of China: Political developments in Taiwan since 1949. Hong Kong University Press.
- Tucker, N. B. (1994). Taiwan, Hong Kong, and the United States, 1945–1992: Uncertain friendships. Twayne.

== Historiography ==
- Huang, G. C. (2021). Chiang Kai-shek's politics of shame: Leadership, legacy, and national identity in China. Harvard University Asia Center.
- Mitter, R. (2020). China's good war: How World War II is shaping a new nationalism. Harvard University Press.
- Taylor, J. E. (2006). The production of the Chiang Kai-shek personality cult, 1929–1975. The China Quarterly, 185, 96–110. doi:10.1017/s0305741006000063
- Taylor, J. E., & Huang, G. C. (2012). "Deep changes in interpretive currents"? Chiang Kai-shek studies in the post-Cold War era. International Journal of Asian Studies, 9(1), 99–121. doi:10.1017/s1479591411000209

== Works by Chiang Kai-shek ==
- Chiang, K.-s. (1946). The collected wartime messages of Generalissimo Chiang Kai-shek, 1937–1945 (Chinese Ministry of Information, Comp.). John Day.
- Chiang, K.-s. (1947). China's destiny (C.-h. Wang, Trans.). Macmillan. (Original work published 1943)
- Chiang, K.-s. (1957). Soviet Russia in China: A summing-up at seventy. Farrar, Straus and Cudahy.

=== Collections ===
- Academia Historica. (n.d.). 國史館檔案史料文物查詢系統 [Archives and artifacts search system]. Online catalog of the archives held by Academia Historica, including the Chiang Kai-shek presidential papers (in Chinese).
- Academia Historica. (n.d.). The collection of President Chiang Kai-shek (Academia Historica). Collection record describing the documents, telegrams, diaries, letters, maps and photographs transferred to Academia Historica in 1995.
- Hoover Institution Library & Archives. (2023, September 15). Diaries of Chiang Kai-shek and Chiang Ching-kuo return to Taiwan, copies remain at the Hoover Institution Library & Archives. Hoover Institution.
- Hoover Institution Library & Archives. (n.d.). Chiang Kai-shek diaries, 1917–1972. Online Archive of California. Finding aid for the photocopied diaries held at Hoover.

== See also ==
- Chiang family
- Chiang Kai-shek diaries
- Chiang Kai-shek Memorial Hall
- Nanjing decade
- New Life Movement
- Project National Glory
- Retreat of the government of the Republic of China to Taiwan
- White Terror (Taiwan)
- Xi'an Incident
