= Bibliography of the history of Tibet =

This is a bibliography of works about the history of Tibet

Tibet (/tɪˈbɛt/) is a region in the western part of East Asia, covering much of the Tibetan Plateau. It is the homeland of the Tibetans. Other ethnic groups also reside on the plateau, including Mongols, the Lhoba, Monpa, Qiang, Sherpa, and since the 20th century, Han and Hui peoples. Tibet is the highest region on Earth, with an average elevation of 4,380 m (14,000 ft). Lying within the Himalayas, the highest point in Tibet is Mount Everest – the highest peak on Earth, standing 8,848 m (29,000 ft) above sea level. Today, the People's Republic of China governs most of the historical area as the Tibet Autonomous Region and autonomous prefectures within Gansu, Sichuan, Qinghai, and Yunnan provinces.

This bibliography contains academic-level English-language books (including translations) and journal articles. Book entries may have references to reviews published in academic journals or major newspapers when these could be considered helpful. These reference reviews also function as a resource to find other works on this subject.

Works listed here are cited in the notes or bibliographies of scholarly sources. Each is published by an academic or major trade press, written by a recognized expert, or substantially reviewed in scholarly journals; borderline cases are omitted. A selection of primary sources is included. Many of the books below carry their own bibliographies; see Further reading section for longer ones, and External links section for historical sites and museums.

Citations follow APA style. (Note: Entries are in plain text APA 7 format without templates; templates are used only for reviews and notes.) Books have citations to academic journal or mainstream published reviews when available. For books only partly about the subject, relevant chapter or section titles are given where useful and available. Translators of the original-language edition are included when possible. In cases where a title or name has appeared with more than one English spelling, the most recent published form is used and a footnote documents any earlier title under which the work appeared.

== General histories ==
- Gros, S. (Ed.). (2019). Frontier Tibet: Patterns of change in the Sino-Tibetan borderlands. Amsterdam University Press. doi:10.5117/9789463728713
- Hoffmann, H. (1975). Tibet: A handbook. Research Center for the Language Sciences, Indiana University.
- Kapstein, M. T. (2006). The Tibetans. Blackwell.
- Laird, T. (2006). The story of Tibet: Conversations with the Dalai Lama. Grove Press.
- Norbu, T. J., & Turnbull, C. M. (1968). Tibet: An account of the history, the religion and the people of Tibet. Simon and Schuster.
- Richardson, H. E. (1962). Tibet and its history. Oxford University Press.
- Samuel, G. (1993). Civilized shamans: Buddhism in Tibetan societies. Smithsonian Institution Press.
- Schaeffer, K. R., Kapstein, M. T., & Tuttle, G. (Eds.). (2013). Sources of Tibetan tradition. Columbia University Press.
- Shakabpa, T. W. D. (1967). Tibet: A political history. Yale University Press.
- Shakabpa, T. W. D. (2010). One hundred thousand moons: An advanced political history of Tibet (D. F. Maher, Trans.). Brill.
- Snellgrove, D., & Richardson, H. (1968). A cultural history of Tibet. Weidenfeld & Nicolson.
- Stein, R. A. (1972). Tibetan civilization (J. E. Stapleton Driver, Trans.). Stanford University Press.
- Tuttle, G., & Schaeffer, K. R. (Eds.). (2013). The Tibetan history reader. Columbia University Press.
- van Schaik, S. (2011). Tibet: A history. Yale University Press. doi:10.12987/9780300172171

== Early and imperial Tibet ==
- Aldenderfer, M., & Zhang, Y. (2004). The prehistory of the Tibetan plateau to the seventh century A.D.: Perspectives and research from China and the West since 1950. Journal of World Prehistory, 18(1), 1–55. doi:10.1023/b:jowo.0000038657.79035.9e
- Aldenderfer, M. (2011). Peopling the Tibetan plateau: Insights from archaeology. High Altitude Medicine & Biology, 12(2), 141–147. doi:10.1089/ham.2010.1094
- Beckwith, C. I. (1987). The Tibetan empire in Central Asia: A history of the struggle for great power among Tibetans, Turks, Arabs, and Chinese during the early Middle Ages. Princeton University Press. doi:10.1515/9780691216300
- Bellezza, J. V. (2008). Zhang Zhung: Foundations of civilization in Tibet: A historical and ethnoarchaeological study of the monuments, rock art, texts, and oral tradition of the ancient Tibetan upland. Verlag der Österreichischen Akademie der Wissenschaften. doi:10.1553/0x003acd54
- Bellezza, J. V. (2014). The dawn of Tibet: The ancient civilization on the roof of the world. Rowman & Littlefield. doi:10.5771/9781442234628
- Bialek, J. (2021). Body exposure and embalming in the Tibetan empire and beyond: A study of the btol rite. Acta Orientalia Academiae Scientiarum Hungaricae, 74(4), 625–650. doi:10.1556/062.2021.00181
- d'Alpoim Guedes, J., & Aldenderfer, M. (2026). The archaeology of the Tibetan plateau. Cambridge University Press. doi:10.1017/9781108680271
- Dalton, J., & van Schaik, S. (2006). Tibetan tantric manuscripts from Dunhuang: A descriptive catalogue of the Stein collection at the British Library. Brill. doi:10.1163/9789047411147
- Davidson, R. M. (2005). Tibetan renaissance: Tantric Buddhism in the rebirth of Tibetan culture. Columbia University Press.
- Dotson, B. (2009). The Old Tibetan Annals: An annotated translation of Tibet's first history. Verlag der Österreichischen Akademie der Wissenschaften. doi:10.1553/0x001a81e8
- Haarh, E. (1969). The Yar-luṅ dynasty: A study with particular regard to the contribution by myths and legends to the history of ancient Tibet and the origin and nature of its kings. Gad.
- Kapstein, M. T. (2000). The Tibetan assimilation of Buddhism: Conversion, contestation, and memory. Oxford University Press.
- Kapstein, M. T., & Dotson, B. (Eds.). (2007). Contributions to the cultural history of early Tibet. Brill. doi:10.1163/ej.9789004160644.i-310
- Richardson, H. E. (1985). A corpus of early Tibetan inscriptions. Royal Asiatic Society.
- Sørensen, P. K. (1994). Tibetan Buddhist historiography: The mirror illuminating the royal genealogies: An annotated translation of the XIVth century Tibetan chronicle rGyal-rabs gsal-ba'i me-long. Harrassowitz.
- van Schaik, S., & Galambos, I. (2012). Manuscripts and travellers: The Sino-Tibetan documents of a tenth-century Buddhist pilgrim. De Gruyter. doi:10.1515/9783110225655
- van Schaik, S. (2015). Tibetan Zen: Discovering a lost tradition. Shambhala Publications.
- Vitali, R. (1996). The kingdoms of Gu.ge Pu.hrang: According to mNga'.ris rgyal.rabs by Gu.ge mkhan.chen Ngag.dbang grags.pa. Tho.ling gtsug.lag.khang lo.gcig.stong 'khor.ba'i rjes.dran.mdzad sgo'i go.sgrig tshogs.chung.
- Walter, M. L. (2009). Buddhism and empire: The political and religious culture of early Tibet. Brill. doi:10.1163/ej.9789004175846.i-316
- Wangdu, P., & Diemberger, H. (2000). dBa' bzhed: The royal narrative concerning the bringing of the Buddha's doctrine to Tibet. Verlag der Österreichischen Akademie der Wissenschaften.

== Mongol, Ganden Phodrang and Qing periods ==
=== General works ===
- Aris, M., & Aung San Suu Kyi (Eds.). (1980). Tibetan studies in honour of Hugh Richardson: Proceedings of the International Seminar on Tibetan Studies, Oxford, 1979. Aris & Phillips.
- Cassinelli, C. W., & Ekvall, R. B. (1969). A Tibetan principality: The political system of Sa sKya. Cornell University Press.
- Cüppers, C. (Ed.). (2004). The relationship between religion and state (chos srid zung 'brel) in traditional Tibet: Proceedings of a seminar held in Lumbini, Nepal, March 2000. Lumbini International Research Institute.
- Karmay, S. G. (1998). The arrow and the spindle: Studies in history, myths, rituals and beliefs in Tibet. Mandala Book Point.
- Kolmaš, J. (1967). Tibet and imperial China: A survey of Sino-Tibetan relations up to the end of the Manchu dynasty in 1912. Centre of Oriental Studies, Australian National University.
- Mullin, G. H. (2001). The fourteen Dalai Lamas: A sacred legacy of reincarnation. Clear Light Publishers.
- Petech, L. (1973). Aristocracy and government in Tibet, 1728–1959. Istituto Italiano per il Medio ed Estremo Oriente.
- Richardson, H. (1998). High peaks, pure earth: Collected writings on Tibetan history and culture (M. Aris, Ed.). Serindia Publications.
- Ruegg, D. S. (1991). mChod yon, yon mchod and mchod gnas/yon gnas: On the historiography and semantics of a Tibetan religio-social and religio-political concept. In E. Steinkellner (Ed.), Tibetan history and language: Studies dedicated to Uray Géza on his seventieth birthday (pp. 441–453). Arbeitskreis für Tibetische und Buddhistische Studien, Universität Wien.
- Schwieger, P. (2015). The Dalai Lama and the emperor of China: A political history of the Tibetan institution of reincarnation. Columbia University Press. doi:10.7312/schw16852
- Smith, E. G. (2001). Among Tibetan texts: History and literature of the Himalayan plateau (K. R. Schaeffer, Ed.). Wisdom Publications.
- Sperling, E. (2004). The Tibet-China conflict: History and polemics. East-West Center Washington.
- Tucci, G. (1949). Tibetan painted scrolls (V. Vacca, Trans.). La Libreria dello Stato.
- Tuttle, G. (2005). Tibetan Buddhists in the making of modern China. Columbia University Press.
- Ya, H. (1991). The biographies of the Dalai Lamas (W. Wang, Trans.). Foreign Languages Press.

=== Mongol period ===
- Czaja, O. (2013). Medieval rule in Tibet: The Rlangs clan and the political and religious history of the ruling house of Phag mo gru pa: With a study of the monastic art of Gdan sa mthil. Verlag der Österreichischen Akademie der Wissenschaften.
- Elverskog, J. (2003). The Jewel Translucent Sūtra: Altan Khan and the Mongols in the sixteenth century. Brill. doi:10.1163/9789004420342
- Franke, H. (1978). From tribal chieftain to universal emperor and god: The legitimation of the Yüan dynasty. Verlag der Bayerischen Akademie der Wissenschaften.
- Franke, H. (1981). Tibetans in Yuan China. In J. D. Langlois Jr. (Ed.), China under Mongol rule (pp. 296–328). Princeton University Press. doi:10.1515/9781400854097.296
- Langlois, J. D., Jr. (Ed.). (1981). China under Mongol rule. Princeton University Press. doi:10.1515/9781400854097
- Petech, L. (1990). Central Tibet and the Mongols: The Yüan–Sa-skya period of Tibetan history. Istituto Italiano per il Medio ed Estremo Oriente.
- Rossabi, M. (1988). Khubilai Khan: His life and times. University of California Press.
- Sørensen, P. K., & Hazod, G. (2007). Rulers on the celestial plain: Ecclesiastic and secular hegemony in medieval Tibet: A study of Tshal Gung-thang (Vols. 1–2). Verlag der Österreichischen Akademie der Wissenschaften. doi:10.1553/0x0016af9a
- Szerb, J. (1985). Glosses on the oeuvre of Bla-ma 'Phags-pa: III. The "patron-patronized" relationship. In B. N. Aziz & M. Kapstein (Eds.), Soundings in Tibetan civilization (pp. 165–173). Manohar.
- van der Kuijp, L. W. J. (2004). The Kālacakra and the patronage of Tibetan Buddhism by the Mongol imperial family. Department of Central Eurasian Studies, Indiana University.
- Wylie, T. V. (1977). The first Mongol conquest of Tibet reinterpreted. Harvard Journal of Asiatic Studies, 37(1). JSTOR 2718667

=== Ming period ===
- Berger, P. (2001). Miracles in Nanjing: An imperial record of the Fifth Karmapa's visit to the Chinese capital. In M. Weidner (Ed.), Cultural intersections in later Chinese Buddhism (pp. 145–169). University of Hawai'i Press.
- Chashab, T. K. (2021). The life of the last Rin spungs pa ruler and his guide to Śambhala: A study based on the 16th century manuscript, Vidyadhara – The Messenger (Rig pa'dzin pa'i pho nya) by Ngag dbang 'jig grags of Rin spungs. University of Warsaw Press. doi:10.31338/uw.9788323551775
- Heimbel, J. (2017). Vajradhara in human form: The life and times of Ngor chen Kun dga' bzang po. Lumbini International Research Institute.
- Jackson, D. P. (1989). The early abbots of 'Phan-po Na-lendra: The vicissitudes of a great Tibetan monastery in the 15th century. Arbeitskreis für Tibetische und Buddhistische Studien, Universität Wien.
- Langelaar, R. (2022). Biography and hierarchy: The Tibetan ruling house of Phag-mo-gru and the singular volume of the Rlangs (Rlangs-kyi-po-ti-bse-ru). Medieval Worlds, (15), 75–94. doi:10.1553/medievalworlds_no15si_2022s75
- Sperling, E. (1980). The 5th Karma-pa and some aspects of the relationship between Tibet and the early Ming. In M. Aris & Aung San Suu Kyi (Eds.), Tibetan studies in honour of Hugh Richardson: Proceedings of the International Seminar on Tibetan Studies, Oxford, 1979 (pp. 280–289). Aris & Phillips.
- Sperling, E. (1988). The Szechwan-Tibet frontier in the fifteenth century. Ming Studies, 1988(1), 37–55. doi:10.1179/014703788788764101
- Stearns, C. (2007). King of the empty plain: The Tibetan iron-bridge builder Tangtong Gyalpo. Snow Lion Publications.
- Weidner, M. (2009). Beyond Yongle: Tibeto-Chinese thangkas for the mid-Ming court. Artibus Asiae, 69(1), 7–37. doi:10.61342/wqws5704
- Wylie, T. V. (1980). Lama tribute in the Ming dynasty. In M. Aris & Aung San Suu Kyi (Eds.), Tibetan studies in honour of Hugh Richardson: Proceedings of the International Seminar on Tibetan Studies, Oxford, 1979 (pp. 335–340). Aris & Phillips.

=== Ganden Phodrang ===
- Ahmad, Z. (1970). Sino-Tibetan relations in the seventeenth century. Istituto Italiano per il Medio ed Estremo Oriente.
- Aris, M. (1989). Hidden treasures and secret lives: A study of Pemalingpa (1450–1521) and the Sixth Dalai Lama (1683–1706). Kegan Paul International.
- Cuevas, B. J., & Schaeffer, K. R. (Eds.). (2006). Power, politics, and the reinvention of tradition: Tibet in the seventeenth and eighteenth centuries. Brill. doi:10.1163/9789047410829
- Ishihama, Y. (1993). On the dissemination of the belief in the Dalai Lama as a manifestation of the Bodhisattva Avalokitesvara. Acta Asiatica, (64), 38–56.
- Karmay, S. G. (1988). Secret visions of the Fifth Dalai Lama: The gold manuscript in the Fournier collection. Serindia.
- Ngag-dbang-blo-bzang-rgya-mtsho, Dalai Lama V. (1995). A history of Tibet (Z. Ahmad, Trans.). Indiana University, Research Institute for Inner Asian Studies.
- Ngag-dbang-blo-bzang-rgya-mtsho, Dalai Lama V. (2014). The illusive play: The autobiography of the Fifth Dalai Lama (S. G. Karmay, Trans.). Serindia Publications.
- Petech, L. (1959). The Dalai-Lamas and regents of Tibet: A chronological study. T'oung Pao, 47(1), 368–394. doi:10.1163/156853259x00141
- Pommaret, F. (Ed.). (2003). Lhasa in the seventeenth century: The capital of the Dalai Lamas (H. Solverson, Trans.). Brill. doi:10.1163/9789004489813
- Sullivan, B. (2021). Building a religious empire: Tibetan Buddhism, bureaucracy, and the rise of the Gelukpa. University of Pennsylvania Press. doi:10.9783/9780812297676
- Travers, A., & Venturi, F. (2018). Buddhism, both the means and the end of the Ganden Phodrang army: An introduction to Buddhism vis-à-vis the military in Tibet (1642–1959). Cahiers d'Extrême-Asie, 27(1), 13–22. doi:10.3406/asie.2018.1505
- Yamaguchi, Z. (1995). The sovereign power of the Fifth Dalai Lama: sPrul sku gZims-khang-gong-ma and the removal of governor Nor-bu. Memoirs of the Research Department of the Toyo Bunko, 53, 1–27.

=== Qing ===
- Berger, P. (2003). Empire of emptiness: Buddhist art and political authority in Qing China. University of Hawai'i Press.
- Dai, Y. (2009). The Sichuan frontier and Tibet: Imperial strategy in the early Qing. University of Washington Press.
- Elverskog, J. (2006). Our great Qing: The Mongols, Buddhism, and the state in late imperial China. University of Hawai'i Press.
- Farquhar, D. M. (1978). Emperor as bodhisattva in the governance of the Ch'ing empire. Harvard Journal of Asiatic Studies, 38(1). JSTOR 2718931
- Fletcher, J. (1978). Ch'ing Inner Asia c. 1800. In J. K. Fairbank (Ed.), The Cambridge history of China: Vol. 10. Late Ch'ing, 1800–1911, part 1 (pp. 35–106). Cambridge University Press. doi:10.1017/chol9780521214476.003
- Millward, J. A., Dunnell, R. W., Elliott, M. C., & Forêt, P. (Eds.). (2004). New Qing imperial history: The making of Inner Asian empire at Qing Chengde. RoutledgeCurzon. doi:10.4324/9780203630938
- Mosca, M. W. (2013). From frontier policy to foreign policy: The question of India and the transformation of geopolitics in Qing China. Stanford University Press.
- Nietupski, P. K. (2011). Labrang Monastery: A Tibetan Buddhist community on the Inner Asian borderlands, 1709–1958. Lexington Books.
- Oidtmann, M. (2018). Forging the golden urn: The Qing empire and the politics of reincarnation in Tibet. Columbia University Press. doi:10.7312/oidt18406
- Perdue, P. C. (2005). China marches west: The Qing conquest of Central Eurasia. Belknap Press of Harvard University Press. doi:10.4159/9780674042025
- Petech, L. (1972). China and Tibet in the early XVIIIth century: History of the establishment of Chinese protectorate in Tibet. Brill. doi:10.1163/9789004645219
- Rawski, E. S. (1998). The last emperors: A social history of Qing imperial institutions. University of California Press. doi:10.1525/california/9780520212893.001.0001
- Rockhill, W. W. (1910). The Dalai Lamas of Lhasa and their relations with the Manchu emperors of China, 1644–1908. T'oung Pao, 11(1), 1–92. doi:10.1163/156853210x00018
- Sperling, E. (1998). Awe and submission: A Tibetan aristocrat at the court of Qianlong. The International History Review, 20(2), 325–335. doi:10.1080/07075332.1998.9640826
- Theobald, U. (2013). War finance and logistics in late imperial China: A study of the Second Jinchuan Campaign (1771–1776). Brill. doi:10.1163/9789004255678
- Tsomu, Y. (2015). The rise of Gönpo Namgyel in Kham: The blind warrior of Nyarong. Lexington Books. doi:10.5040/9781978737174
- Waley-Cohen, J. (2006). The culture of war in China: Empire and the military under the Qing dynasty. I. B. Tauris. doi:10.5040/9780755624010
- Wang, X. (2000). The Qing court's Tibet connection: Lcang skya Rol pa'i rdo rje and the Qianlong emperor. Harvard Journal of Asiatic Studies, 60(1). JSTOR 2652702

== Late Qing, British India and the Republic of China, 1766–1951 ==
=== General works ===
- Aris, M. (Ed.). (1992). Lamas, princes, and brigands: Joseph Rock's photographs of the Tibetan borderlands of China. China House Gallery, China Institute in America.
- Bell, C. (1924). Tibet, past & present. Clarendon Press.
- Bell, C. (1928). The people of Tibet. Clarendon Press.
- Carrasco, P. (1959). Land and polity in Tibet. University of Washington Press.
- Epstein, L. (Ed.). (2002). Khams pa histories: Visions of people, place and authority. Brill. doi:10.1163/9789004482982
- Goldstein, M. C. (1971). Serfdom and mobility: An examination of the institution of "human lease" in traditional Tibetan society. The Journal of Asian Studies, 30(3), 521–534. JSTOR 2052458
- Goldstein, M. C. (1973). The circulation of estates in Tibet: Reincarnation, land and politics. The Journal of Asian Studies, 32(3), 445–455. JSTOR 2052683
- McKay, A. C. (1992). The establishment of the British trade agencies in Tibet: A survey. Journal of the Royal Asiatic Society, 2(3), 399–421. doi:10.1017/s1356186300003023
- Mukherjee, S. (2023). A matter of taste: Tea, opium, and trade monopolies in Tibet. Crossroads, 21(1–2), 53–89. doi:10.1163/26662523-bja10013
- Rockhill, W. W. (1891). The land of the lamas: Notes of a journey through China, Mongolia and Tibet. Century Co.
- Smith, W. W., Jr. (1996). Tibetan nation: A history of Tibetan nationalism and Sino-Tibetan relations. Westview Press.
- Travers, A. (2008). Exclusiveness and openness: A study of matrimonial strategies in the Ganden Phodrang aristocracy (1880–1959). Journal of the International Association of Tibetan Studies, 4, 1–27.
- van Spengen, W. (2000). Tibetan border worlds: A geohistorical analysis of trade and traders. Kegan Paul International.

=== Late Qing ===
- Adshead, S. A. M. (1984). Province and politics in late imperial China: Viceregal government in Szechwan, 1898–1911. Curzon.
- Giersch, C. P. (2008). "Grieving for Tibet": Conceiving the modern state in late-Qing Inner Asia. China Perspectives, 2008(3), 4–18. doi:10.4000/chinaperspectives.4013
- Ho, D. D. (2008). The men who would not be amban and the one who would. Modern China, 34(2), 210–246. doi:10.1177/0097700407312856
- Kolmaš, J. (1994). The ambans and assistant ambans of Tibet: A chronological study. Oriental Institute.
- Relyea, S. (2015a). Conceiving the "West": Early twentieth-century visions of Kham. Twentieth-Century China, 40(3), 181–200. doi:10.1353/tcc.2015.0002
- Relyea, S. (2015b). Yokes of gold and threads of silk: Sino-Tibetan competition for authority in early twentieth century Kham. Modern Asian Studies, 49(4), 963–1009. doi:10.1017/s0026749x14000298
- Relyea, S. (2016). Victorianizing Guangxu: Arresting flows, minting coins, and exerting authority in early twentieth-century Kham. Cross-Currents: East Asian History and Culture Review, 5(2), 350–377. doi:10.1353/ach.2016.0011
- Relyea, S. (2018). Lamas, empresses and tea: Early twentieth-century Sino-British encounters in eastern Tibet. The Journal of Imperial and Commonwealth History, 46(2), 257–285. doi:10.1080/03086534.2018.1431380
- Sperling, E. (1976). The Chinese venture in K'am, 1904–1911, and the role of Chao Erh-feng. The Tibet Journal, 1(2), 10–36.
- Wang, X. (2011). China's last imperial frontier: Late Qing expansion in Sichuan's Tibetan borderlands. Lexington Books.

=== British India and Tibet ===
- Addy, P. (1984). Tibet on the imperial chessboard: The making of British policy towards Lhasa, 1899–1925. Academic.
- Allen, C. (2004). Duel in the snows: The true story of the Younghusband mission to Lhasa. John Murray.
- Candler, E. (1905). The unveiling of Lhasa. Edward Arnold.
- Carrington, M. (2003). Officers, gentlemen and thieves: The looting of monasteries during the 1903/4 Younghusband mission to Tibet. Modern Asian Studies, 37(1), 81–109. doi:10.1017/s0026749x03001033
- Fleming, P. (1961). Bayonets to Lhasa: The first full account of the British invasion of Tibet in 1904. R. Hart-Davis.
- French, P. (1994). Younghusband: The last great imperial adventurer. HarperCollins.
- Hopkirk, P. (1982). Trespassers on the roof of the world: The race for Lhasa. John Murray.
- Lamb, A. (1966). The McMahon Line: A study in the relations between India, China and Tibet, 1904 to 1914 (Vols. 1–2). Routledge & Kegan Paul.
- Lamb, A. (1986). British India and Tibet, 1766–1910 (2nd ed.). Routledge & Kegan Paul.
- Lamb, A. (1989). Tibet, China & India, 1914–1950: A history of imperial diplomacy. Roxford Books.
- Lin, H.-T. (2004). Boundary, sovereignty, and imagination: Reconsidering the frontier disputes between British India and Republican China, 1914–47. The Journal of Imperial and Commonwealth History, 32(3), 25–47. doi:10.1080/0308653042000279650
- Markham, C. R. (Ed.). (1876). Narratives of the mission of George Bogle to Tibet, and of the journey of Thomas Manning to Lhasa. Trübner.
- McKay, A. (1997). Tibet and the British Raj: The frontier cadre, 1904–1947. Curzon.
- Mehra, P. (1968). The Younghusband expedition: An interpretation. Asia Publishing House.
- Mehra, P. (1974). The McMahon Line and after: A study of the triangular contest on India's north-eastern frontier between Britain, China and Tibet, 1904–47. Macmillan.
- Palace, W. (2004). The British Empire and Tibet 1900–1922. Routledge. doi:10.4324/9780203309957
- Stewart, G. T. (2009). Journeys to empire: Enlightenment, imperialism, and the British encounter with Tibet, 1774–1904. Cambridge University Press.
- Waddell, L. A. (1905). Lhasa and its mysteries: With a record of the expedition of 1903–1904. J. Murray.
- Waller, D. J. (1990). The pundits: British exploration of Tibet and Central Asia. University Press of Kentucky.
- Younghusband, F. (1910). India and Tibet: A history of the relations which have subsisted between the two countries from the time of Warren Hastings to 1910; with a particular account of the mission to Lhasa of 1904. John Murray.

=== Republic of China ===
- Bell, C. (1946). Portrait of the Dalai Lama. Collins.
- Dhondup, K. (1986). The water-bird and other years: A history of the Thirteenth Dalai Lama and after. Rangwang Publishers.
- Goldstein, M. C. (1989). A history of modern Tibet, 1913–1951: The demise of the Lamaist state. University of California Press. doi:10.1525/9780520911765
- Harrer, H. (1953). Seven years in Tibet (R. Graves, Trans.). Rupert Hart-Davis.
- Jagou, F. (2011). The Ninth Panchen Lama (1883–1937): A life at the crossroads of Sino-Tibetan relations (R. Bissett Buechel, Trans.). Silkworm Books; École française d'Extrême-Orient.
- Leibold, J. (2007). Reconfiguring Chinese nationalism: How the Qing frontier and its indigenes became Chinese. Palgrave Macmillan. doi:10.1007/978-1-137-09884-9
- Lin, H.-T. (2007). Tibet and Nationalist China's frontier: Intrigues and ethnopolitics, 1928–49. UBC Press. doi:10.59962/9780774855280
- Lin, H.-T. (2010). Modern China's ethnic frontiers: A journey to the West. Routledge. doi:10.4324/9780203844977
- Lobsang Tenpa. (2012). The 1913 Mongol–Tibet treaty and the Dalai Lama's proclamation of independence. The Tibet Journal, 37(2), 3–29.
- McGranahan, C. (2005). In Rapga's library: The texts and times of a rebel Tibetan intellectual. Cahiers d'Extrême-Asie, 15(1), 253–274. doi:10.3406/asie.2005.1228
- Mehra, P. (1976). Tibetan polity, 1904–37: The conflict between the 13th Dalai Lama and the 9th Panchen: A case study. Otto Harrassowitz.
- Teichman, E. (1922). Travels of a consular officer in eastern Tibet: Together with a history of the relations between China, Tibet and India. Cambridge University Press.
- Travers, A. (2017). The lCags stag dmag khrims (1950): A new development in Tibetan legal and military history. In J. Bischoff & S. Mullard (Eds.), Social regulation: Case studies from Tibetan history (pp. 99–125). Brill. doi:10.1163/9789004331259_006
- Travers, A. (2018). Monk officials as military officers in the Tibetan Ganden Phodrang army (1895–1959). Cahiers d'Extrême-Asie, 27(1), 211–242. doi:10.3406/asie.2018.1512
- Travers, A. (2021). From matchlocks to machine guns: The modernisation of the Tibetan army's firearms between local production and import (1895–1950). Annali di Ca' Foscari. Serie orientale, 57(Suppl.). doi:10.30687/annor/2385-3042/2021/02/006
- Tsomu, Y. (2013). Taming the Khampas: The Republican construction of eastern Tibet. Modern China, 39(3), 319–344. doi:10.1177/0097700412464127
- Van Vleet, S. (2018). Strength, defence, and victory in battle: Tibetan medical institutions and the Ganden Phodrang army, 1897–1938. Cahiers d'Extrême-Asie, 27(1), 173–210. doi:10.3406/asie.2018.1511

== Chinese takeover and the 1959 uprising ==
- Becker, J. (1996). Hungry ghosts: China's secret famine. John Murray.
- Bianco, L. (2021). The 1958–62 Chinese famine and its impact on ethnic minorities. East/West: Journal of Ukrainian Studies, 8(1), 173–191. doi:10.21226/ewjus644
- Bstan-vdzin-rgya-mtsho, Dalai Lama XIV. (1962). My land and my people. McGraw-Hill.
- Chen, J. (2006). The Tibetan rebellion of 1959 and China's changing relations with India and the Soviet Union. Journal of Cold War Studies, 8(3), 54–101. doi:10.1162/jcws.2006.8.3.54
- Conboy, K., & Morrison, J. (2002). The CIA's secret war in Tibet. University Press of Kansas.
- Dunham, M. (2004). Buddha's warriors: The story of the CIA-backed Tibetan freedom fighters, the Chinese invasion, and the ultimate fall of Tibet. Jeremy P. Tarcher/Penguin.
- Ford, R. (1957). Captured in Tibet. Harrap.
- Goldstein, M. C., Siebenschuh, W. R., & Tsering, T. (1997). The struggle for modern Tibet: The autobiography of Tashi Tsering. M. E. Sharpe.
- Goldstein, M. C., Sherap, D., & Siebenschuh, W. R. (2004). A Tibetan revolutionary: The political life and times of Bapa Phüntso Wangye. University of California Press. doi:10.1525/9780520940307
- Goldstein, M. C. (2007). A history of modern Tibet: Vol. 2. The calm before the storm, 1951–1955. University of California Press. doi:10.1525/california/9780520249417.001.0001
- Goldstein, M. C. (2014). A history of modern Tibet: Vol. 3. The storm clouds descend, 1955–1957. University of California Press.
- Goldstein, M. C. (2019). A history of modern Tibet: Vol. 4. In the eye of the storm, 1957–1959. University of California Press. doi:10.1525/9780520972254
- Khan, S. W. (2015). Muslim, trader, nomad, spy: China's Cold War and the people of the Tibetan borderlands. University of North Carolina Press. doi:10.5149/northcarolina/9781469621104.001.0001
- Knaus, J. K. (1999). Orphans of the Cold War: America and the Tibetan struggle for survival. PublicAffairs.
- Li, J. (2016). Tibet in agony: Lhasa 1959 (S. Wilf, Trans.). Harvard University Press. doi:10.4159/9780674973688
- Liu, X. (2020). To the end of revolution: The Chinese Communist Party and Tibet, 1949–1959. Columbia University Press.
- McGranahan, C. (2010). Arrested histories: Tibet, the CIA, and memories of a forgotten war. Duke University Press. doi:10.1215/9780822392972
- Norbu, D. (1974). Red star over Tibet. Collins.
- Shakya, T. (1999). The dragon in the land of snows: A history of modern Tibet since 1947. Columbia University Press.
- Weiner, B. (2020). The Chinese revolution on the Tibetan frontier. Cornell University Press. doi:10.7591/cornell/9781501749391.001.0001

== Tibet since 1959 ==
- Barnett, R., & Akiner, S. (Eds.). (1994). Resistance and reform in Tibet. Indiana University Press.
- Barnett, R., & Schwartz, R. D. (Eds.). (2008). Tibetan modernities: Notes from the field on cultural and social change. Brill. doi:10.1163/ej.9789004155220.i-458
- Barnett, R. (2009). The Tibet protests of spring 2008. China Perspectives, 2009(3), 6–23. doi:10.4000/chinaperspectives.4836
- Davis, M. C. (2007). The quest for self-rule in Tibet. Journal of Democracy, 18(4), 157–171. doi:10.1353/jod.2007.a223230
- Davis, M. C. (2008). Establishing a workable autonomy in Tibet. Human Rights Quarterly, 30(2), 227–258. doi:10.1353/hrq.0.0001
- Fischer, A. M. (2005). State growth and social exclusion in Tibet: Challenges of recent economic growth. Nordic Institute of Asian Studies.
- Goldstein, M. C. (1997). The snow lion and the dragon: China, Tibet, and the Dalai Lama. University of California Press. doi:10.1525/9780520923256
- Goldstein, M. C., & Kapstein, M. T. (Eds.). (1998). Buddhism in contemporary Tibet: Religious revival and cultural identity. University of California Press.
- Goldstein, M. C., Jiao, B., & Lhundrup, T. (2009). On the Cultural Revolution in Tibet: The Nyemo incident of 1969. University of California Press.
- Grant, A. (2018). Hyperbuilding the civilized city: Ethnicity and marginalization in eastern Tibet. Critical Asian Studies, 50(4), 537–555. doi:10.1080/14672715.2018.1514270
- Grunfeld, A. T. (1996). The making of modern Tibet (Rev. ed.). M. E. Sharpe.
- Hillman, B., & Tuttle, G. (Eds.). (2016). Ethnic conflict and protest in Tibet and Xinjiang: Unrest in China's West. Columbia University Press. doi:10.7312/hill16998
- Huber, T. (Ed.). (2002). Amdo Tibetans in transition: Society and culture in the post-Mao era. Brill. doi:10.1163/9789004483095
- Leibold, J. (2013). Ethnic policy in China: Is reform inevitable?. East-West Center.
- Norbu, D. (2001). China's Tibet policy. Curzon Press.
- Rabgey, T., & Sharlho, T. W. (2004). Sino-Tibetan dialogue in the post-Mao era: Lessons and prospects. East-West Center Washington.
- Sautman, B., & Dreyer, J. T. (Eds.). (2006). Contemporary Tibet: Politics, development, and society in a disputed region. M. E. Sharpe.
- Shakya, T., & Wang, L. (2009). The struggle for Tibet. Verso.
- Smith, W. W., Jr. (2008). China's Tibet? Autonomy or assimilation. Rowman & Littlefield. doi:10.5771/9780742567917
- Topgyal, T. (2013). Identity insecurity and the Tibetan resistance against China. Pacific Affairs, 86(3), 515–538. doi:10.5509/2013863515
- Topgyal, T. (2016). China and Tibet: The perils of insecurity. Hurst & Company.
- Tsakhirmaa, S. (2022). Comparative ethnic territorially-based autonomy in Xinjiang, Tibet, Inner Mongolia and Ningxia of China 2010–2015: An analytical framework. Journal of Contemporary China, 31(138), 949–976. doi:10.1080/10670564.2022.2031001
- Tuttle, G. (Ed.). (2011). Mapping the modern in Tibet. International Institute for Tibetan and Buddhist Studies.
- Woeser, T. (2020). Forbidden memory: Tibet during the Cultural Revolution (R. Barnett, Ed.; S. T. Chen, Trans.). Potomac Books. JSTOR j.ctvzxxbdk
- Yeh, E. T. (2007). Tropes of indolence and the cultural politics of development in Lhasa, Tibet. Annals of the Association of American Geographers, 97(3), 593–612. doi:10.1111/j.1467-8306.2007.00565.x
- Yeh, E. T. (2013). Taming Tibet: Landscape transformation and the gift of Chinese development. Cornell University Press. doi:10.7591/9780801469787
- Yeh, E. T., & Coggins, C. (Eds.). (2014). Mapping Shangrila: Contested landscapes in the Sino-Tibetan borderlands. University of Washington Press. doi:10.1515/9780295805023

== Human rights and repression ==
=== General works ===
- Amnesty International. (1992). People's Republic of China: Repression in Tibet, 1987–1992 (AI Index ASA 17/19/92).
- Ardley, J. (2002). The Tibetan independence movement: Political, religious and Gandhian perspectives. RoutledgeCurzon.
- Asia Watch (1990). Merciless repression: Human rights abuses in Tibet (PDF). Human Rights Watch (Report).
- Barnett, R. (2012). Political self-immolation in Tibet and Chinese popular culture. Revue d'Etudes Tibétaines, (25).
- Bass, C. (1998). Education in Tibet: Policy and practice since 1950. Zed Books.
- Chos-kyi-dbang-phyug, 10th Panchen Lama. (1997). A poisoned arrow: The secret report of the 10th Panchen Lama. Tibet Information Network.
- Fischer, A. M. (2014). The disempowered development of Tibet in China: A study in the economics of marginalization. Lexington Books.
- Hilton, I. (2000). The search for the Panchen Lama. W. W. Norton.
- Human Rights Watch (8 February 2004). "Trials of a Tibetan Monk: The Case of Tenzin Delek". Human Rights Watch.
- “I Saw It with My Own Eyes”: Abuses by Chinese Security Forces in Tibet, 2008-2010 (Report). Human Rights Watch. 21 July 2010.
- Human Rights Watch (22 May 2016). "Relentless: Detention and Prosecution of Tibetans under China's "Stability Maintenance" Campaign". Human Rights Watch.
- Information Office of the State Council of the People's Republic of China. (1992). Tibet: Its ownership and human rights situation.
- International Commission of Jurists. (1997). Tibet: Human rights and the rule of law.
- Kolås, Å., & Thowsen, M. P. (2005). On the margins of Tibet: Cultural survival on the Sino-Tibetan frontier. University of Washington Press.
- Lafitte, G. (2013). Spoiling Tibet: China and resource nationalism on the roof of the world. Zed Books.
- Leibold, J., & Dorjee, T. (2023). Learning to be Chinese: Colonial-style boarding schools on the Tibetan plateau. Comparative Education, 60(1), 118–137. doi:10.1080/03050068.2023.2250969
- Li, J. (2022). When the iron bird flies: China's secret war in Tibet. Stanford University Press. doi:10.1515/9781503629790
- Makley, C. (2015). The sociopolitical lives of dead bodies: Tibetan self-immolation protest as mass media. Cultural Anthropology, 30(3), 448–476. doi:10.14506/ca30.3.05
- Makley, C. (2018). The battle for fortune: State-led development, personhood, and power among Tibetans in China. Cornell University Press. doi:10.7591/9781501719653
- Makley, C. E. (2007). The violence of liberation: Gender and Tibetan Buddhist revival in post-Mao China. University of California Press. doi:10.1525/california/9780520250598.001.0001
- Marshall, S., & Schell, O. (2000). Tibet since 1950: Silence, prison, or exile. Aperture; Human Rights Watch.
- Powers, J. (2016). The Buddha party: How the People's Republic of China works to define and control Tibetan Buddhism. Oxford University Press.
- Schwartz, R. D. (1994). Circle of protest: Political ritual in the Tibetan uprising. Hurst & Co.
- Shakya, T. (2012). Self immolation, the changing language of protest in Tibet. Revue d'Etudes Tibétaines, (25), 19–39.
- Smith, W. W., Jr. (2010). Tibet's last stand? The Tibetan uprising of 2008 and China's response. Rowman & Littlefield.
- Tibet Information Network; Human Rights Watch/Asia (1996). "Cutting off the serpent's head: Tightening control in Tibet, 1994–1995". Human Rights Watch.
- Wang, L. (2002). Reflections on Tibet. New Left Review, (14), 79–111.
- Woeser, T., & Wang, L. (2013). Voices from Tibet: Selected essays and reportage (V. S. Law, Ed. & Trans.). Hong Kong University Press. doi:10.5790/hongkong/9789888208111.001.0001
- Woeser, T. (2016). Tibet on fire: Self-immolations against Chinese rule (K. Carrico, Trans.). Verso.
- Yang, M. (2017). Learning to be safe citizens: State-run boarding schools and the dynamics of Tibetan identity. Citizenship Studies, 21(7), 824–841. doi:10.1080/13621025.2017.1353738
- Zenz, A. (2014). 'Tibetanness' under threat? Neo-integrationism, minority education and career strategies in Qinghai, P.R. China. Global Oriental.

=== Reeducation camps ===
- Human Rights Watch (29 March 2017). "China: Major Tibetan Buddhist Institution Faces Further Demolitions". Human Rights Watch.
- International Campaign for Tibet. (1996). A season to purge: Religious repression in Tibet. International Campaign for Tibet.
- Ptáčková, J. (2025). Sinicisation of mind: Everyday control and patriotic education in Tibetan areas of the PRC. Religio, 33(2), 255–274. doi:10.5817/rel2025-41630
- Walker, N., & Curtis, J. (2020). China's rapid expansion of the labour programme in Tibet (Debate Pack CDP-2020-0092). House of Commons Library.
- Zenz, A. (2020). Xinjiang's system of militarized vocational training comes to Tibet. China Brief, 20(17).

=== Concentration and labour camps ===
- Ani Pachen, & Donnelley, A. (2000). Sorrow mountain: The journey of a Tibetan warrior nun. Kodansha International.
- Asia Watch. (1994). Detained in China and Tibet: A directory of political and religious prisoners. Human Rights Watch.
- Gyatso, P. (1997). The autobiography of a Tibetan monk (T. Shakya, Trans.). Grove Press.
- Khétsun, T. (2008). Memories of life in Lhasa under Chinese rule (M. Akester, Trans.). Columbia University Press. doi:10.7312/khet14286
- Marshall, S. D. (1999). Hostile elements: A study of political imprisonment in Tibet, 1987–1998. Tibet Information Network.
- Nulo, N. (2014). My Tibetan childhood: When ice shattered stone (A. Cargill & S. Lhamo, Trans.). Duke University Press. doi:10.1215/9780822376385
- Seymour, J. D., & Anderson, R. (1998). New ghosts, old ghosts: Prisons and labor reform camps in China. M. E. Sharpe.
- Tapontsang, A., & Blakeslee, J. (1997). Ama Adhe, the voice that remembers: The heroic story of a woman's fight to free Tibet. Wisdom Publications.

=== Forced resettlement ===
- Bauer, K. (2015). New homes, new lives: The social and economic effects of resettlement on Tibetan nomads (Yushu prefecture, Qinghai province, PRC). Nomadic Peoples, 19(2), 209–220. doi:10.3197/np.2015.190204
- Du, F. (2012). Ecological resettlement of Tibetan herders in the Sanjiangyuan: A case study in Madoi County of Qinghai. Nomadic Peoples, 16(1), 116–133. doi:10.3167/np.2012.160109
- Foggin, J. M. (2008). Depopulating the Tibetan grasslands. Mountain Research and Development, 28(1), 26–31. doi:10.1659/mrd.0972
- Goldstein, M. C., Childs, G., & Wangdui, P. (2010). Beijing's "people first" development initiative for the Tibet Autonomous Region's rural sector: A case study from the Shigatse area. The China Journal, 63, 57–75. doi:10.1086/tcj.63.20749194
- Human Rights Watch (2007). No One Has the Liberty to Refuse: Tibetan Herders Forcibly Relocated in Gansu, Qinghai, Sichuan, and the Tibet Autonomous Region. Human Rights Watch (Report).
- ""They Say We Should Be Grateful": Mass Rehousing and Relocation Programs in Tibetan Areas of China". Human Rights Watch. 27 June 2013.
- Wang, Maya (21 May 2024). ""Educate the Masses to Change Their Minds": China's Forced Relocation of Rural Tibetans". Human Rights Watch.
- Ptáčková, J. (2011). Sedentarisation of Tibetan nomads in China: Implementation of the nomadic settlement project in the Tibetan Amdo area; Qinghai and Sichuan provinces. Pastoralism: Research, Policy and Practice, 1, Article 4. doi:10.1186/2041-7136-1-4
- Ptáčková, J. (2020). Exile from the grasslands: Tibetan herders and Chinese development projects. University of Washington Press. doi:10.1515/9780295748207
- Yeh, E. T. (2005). Green governmentality and pastoralism in western China: "Converting pastures to grasslands". Nomadic Peoples, 9(1–2), 9–30. doi:10.3167/082279405781826164

== Genocide and cultural genocide debate ==
- Anand, D. (2018). Colonization with Chinese characteristics: Politics of (in)security in Xinjiang and Tibet. Central Asian Survey, 38(1), 129–147. doi:10.1080/02634937.2018.1534801
- International Commission of Jurists. (1959). The question of Tibet and the rule of law.
- Legal Inquiry Committee on Tibet. (1960). Tibet and the Chinese People's Republic: Report to the International Commission of Jurists. International Commission of Jurists.
- Roche, G. (2019). Articulating language oppression: Colonialism, coloniality and the erasure of Tibet's minority languages. Patterns of Prejudice, 53(5), 487–514. doi:10.1080/0031322X.2019.1662074
- Roche, G., & Leibold, J. (2020). China's second-generation ethnic policies are already here: What China's history of paper genocide can tell us about the future of its 'minority nationalities'. Made in China Journal.
- Sautman, B. (2003). "Cultural genocide" and Tibet. Texas International Law Journal, 38(2).
- Sautman, B. (2006). Colonialism, genocide, and Tibet. Asian Ethnicity, 7(3), 243–265. doi:10.1080/14631360600926949
- Tibet Action Institute. (2021). Separated from their families, hidden from the world: China's vast system of colonial boarding schools inside Tibet.

== Exile and diaspora ==
- Anand, D. (2000). (Re)imagining nationalism: Identity and representation in the Tibetan diaspora of South Asia. Contemporary South Asia, 9(3), 271–287. doi:10.1080/713658756
- Brox, T. (2016). Tibetan democracy: Governance, leadership and conflict in exile. I. B. Tauris. doi:10.5040/9781350989450
- Bstan-vdzin-rgya-mtsho, Dalai Lama XIV. (1990). Freedom in exile: The autobiography of the Dalai Lama. HarperCollins.
- Diehl, K. (2002). Echoes from Dharamsala: Music in the life of a Tibetan refugee community. University of California Press.
- Falcone, J., & Wangchuk, T. (2008). "We're not home": Tibetan refugees in India in the twenty-first century. India Review, 7(3), 164–199. doi:10.1080/14736480802261459
- Frechette, A. (2002). Tibetans in Nepal: The dynamics of international assistance among a community in exile. Berghahn Books.
- Goldstein, M. C. (1978). Ethnogenesis and resource competition among Tibetan refugees in South India: A new face to the Indo-Tibetan interface. In J. F. Fisher (Ed.), Himalayan anthropology: The Indo-Tibetan interface (pp. 395–420). Mouton. doi:10.1515/9783110806496.395
- Hess, J. M. (2006). Statelessness and the state: Tibetans, citizenship, and nationalist activism in a transnational world. International Migration, 44(1), 79–103. doi:10.1111/j.1468-2435.2006.00356.x
- Hess, J. M. (2009). Immigrant ambassadors: Citizenship and belonging in the Tibetan diaspora. Stanford University Press. doi:10.1515/9780804776318
- Klieger, P. C. (1992). Tibetan nationalism: The role of patronage in the accomplishment of national identity. Folklore Institute.
- Klieger, P. C. (Ed.). (2002). Tibet, self, and the Tibetan diaspora: Voices of difference. Brill. doi:10.1163/9789004489455
- McConnell, F. (2016). Rehearsing the state: The political practices of the Tibetan government-in-exile. Wiley Blackwell. doi:10.1002/9781118661192
- McGranahan, C. (2010). Narrative dispossession: Tibet and the gendered logics of historical possibility. Comparative Studies in Society and History, 52(4), 768–797. doi:10.1017/s0010417510000460
- Nowak, M. (1984). Tibetan refugees: Youth and the new generation of meaning. Rutgers University Press. doi:10.36019/9781978816572
- Roemer, S. (2008). The Tibetan government-in-exile: Politics at large. Routledge. doi:10.4324/9780203928141
- Yeh, E. T., & Lama, K. T. (2006). Hip-hop gangsta or most deserving of victims? Transnational migrant identities and the paradox of Tibetan racialization in the USA. Environment and Planning A, 38(5), 809–829. doi:10.1068/a37218
- Yeh, E. T. (2007). Exile meets homeland: Politics, performance, and authenticity in the Tibetan diaspora. Environment and Planning D: Society and Space, 25(4), 648–667. doi:10.1068/d2805

== Foreign relations ==
- Andreyev, A. (2003). Soviet Russia and Tibet: The debacle of secret diplomacy, 1918–1930s. Brill.
- Berry, S. (1995). Monks, spies and a soldier of fortune: The Japanese in Tibet. Athlone Press.
- Chuluun, S., & Bulag, U. E. (Eds.). (2013). The Thirteenth Dalai Lama on the run (1904–1906): Archival documents from Mongolia. Brill. doi:10.1163/9789004254558
- Das, S. C. (1902). Journey to Lhasa and central Tibet (W. W. Rockhill, Ed.). J. Murray.
- David-Néel, A. (1927). My journey to Lhasa. William Heinemann.
- Desideri, I. (2010). Mission to Tibet: The extraordinary eighteenth-century account of Father Ippolito Desideri, S.J. (L. Zwilling, Ed.; M. J. Sweet, Trans.). Wisdom Publications.
- Garver, J. W. (2001). Protracted contest: Sino-Indian rivalry in the twentieth century. University of Washington Press.
- Goldstein, M. C. (2006). The United States, Tibet, and the Cold War. Journal of Cold War Studies, 8(3), 145–164. doi:10.1162/jcws.2006.8.3.145
- Hansen, P. H. (1996). The dancing lamas of Everest: Cinema, Orientalism, and Anglo-Tibetan relations in the 1920s. The American Historical Review, 101(3), 712–747. doi:10.1086/ahr/101.3.712
- Huc, É. R. (1852). Travels in Tartary, Thibet, and China, during the years 1844–5–6 (W. Hazlitt, Trans.; Vols. 1–2). Office of the National Illustrated Library.
- Hyer, P. (2020). Japanese expansion and Tibetan independence. In L. Narangoa & R. Cribb (Eds.), Imperial Japan and national identities in Asia, 1895–1945 (pp. 69–89). Routledge. doi:10.4324/9781003062424-4
- Ishihama, Y., & McKay, A. (Eds.). (2022). The early 20th century resurgence of the Tibetan Buddhist world. Amsterdam University Press. doi:10.1017/9789048553068
- Kawaguchi, E. (1909). Three years in Tibet. Theosophical Publishing Society.
- Knaus, J. K. (2012). Beyond Shangri-La: America and Tibet's move into the twenty-first century. Duke University Press. doi:10.1215/9780822395300
- Maxwell, N. (1970). India's China war. Cape.
- Norbu, D. (1997). Tibet in Sino-Indian relations: The centrality of marginality. Asian Survey, 37(11), 1078–1095. JSTOR 2645742
- Pomplun, T. (2010). Jesuit on the roof of the world: Ippolito Desideri's mission to eighteenth-century Tibet. Oxford University Press.
- Raghavan, S. (2010). War and peace in modern India: A strategic history of the Nehru years. Palgrave Macmillan. doi:10.1057/9780230277519
- Snelling, J. (1993). Buddhism in Russia: The story of Agvan Dorzhiev, Lhasa's emissary to the Tsar. Element.
- Teltscher, K. (2006). The high road to China: George Bogle, the Panchen Lama and the first expedition to Tibet. Bloomsbury.
- van Walt van Praag, M. C. (1987). The status of Tibet: History, rights, and prospects in international law. Westview Press.

== Himalayan borderlands ==
- Aris, M. (1979). Bhutan: The early history of a Himalayan kingdom. Aris & Phillips.
- Aris, M. (1994). The raven crown: The origins of Buddhist monarchy in Bhutan. Serindia Publications.
- Bray, J. (Ed.). (2005). Ladakhi histories: Local and regional perspectives. Brill. doi:10.1163/9789047408093
- Komatsubara, Y. (2017). A study of the treaty of the first Tibet-Gorkha war of 1789. In J. Bischoff & S. Mullard (Eds.), Social regulation: Case studies from Tibetan history (pp. 181–196). Brill. doi:10.1163/9789004331259_009
- Mullard, S. (2011). Opening the hidden land: State formation and the construction of Sikkimese history. Brill. doi:10.1163/9789004208964
- Petech, L. (1977). The kingdom of Ladakh, c. 950–1842 A.D.. Istituto Italiano per il Medio ed Estremo Oriente.
- Phuntsho, K. (2013). The history of Bhutan. Random House India.
- Rizvi, J. (1996). Ladakh: Crossroads of High Asia (2nd ed.). Oxford University Press.
- Rose, L. E. (1971). Nepal: Strategy for survival. University of California Press. doi:10.1525/9780520338692

== Culture ==
=== Religion ===
- Dalton, J. P. (2011). The taming of the demons: Violence and liberation in Tibetan Buddhism. Yale University Press.
- Diemberger, H. (2007). When a woman becomes a religious dynasty: The Samding Dorje Phagmo of Tibet. Columbia University Press.
- Dreyfus, G. B. J. (2003). The sound of two hands clapping: The education of a Tibetan Buddhist monk. University of California Press. doi:10.1525/california/9780520232594.001.0001
- Ekvall, R. B. (1964). Religious observances in Tibet: Patterns and function. University of Chicago Press.
- Gyatso, J. (1998). Apparitions of the self: The secret autobiographies of a Tibetan visionary. Princeton University Press.
- Huber, T. (1999). The cult of Pure Crystal Mountain: Popular pilgrimage and visionary landscape in southeast Tibet. Oxford University Press. doi:10.1093/oso/9780195120073.001.0001
- Jansen, B. (2018). The monastery rules: Buddhist monastic organization in pre-modern Tibet. University of California Press. doi:10.1525/luminos.56
- Karmay, S. G. (1988). The Great Perfection (rDzogs chen): A philosophical and meditative teaching of Tibetan Buddhism. E. J. Brill. doi:10.1163/9789004644502
- Karmay, S. G. (Ed. & Trans.). (1972). The treasury of good sayings: A Tibetan history of Bon. Oxford University Press.
- Kværne, P. (1995). The Bon religion of Tibet: The iconography of a living tradition. Serindia Publications.
- Lopez, D. S., Jr. (Ed.). (1997). Religions of Tibet in practice. Princeton University Press.
- McKay, A. (Ed.). (1998). Pilgrimage in Tibet. Curzon.
- Mills, M. A. (2003). Identity, ritual and state in Tibetan Buddhism: The foundations of authority in Gelukpa monasticism. RoutledgeCurzon.
- Snellgrove, D. L. (1987). Indo-Tibetan Buddhism: Indian Buddhists and their Tibetan successors. Serindia Publications.
- Snellgrove, D. L. (Ed. & Trans.). (1967). The nine ways of Bon: Excerpts from gZi-brjid. Oxford University Press.
- Tucci, G. (1980). The religions of Tibet (G. Samuel, Trans.). University of California Press.

=== Society ===
- Adams, V., Schrempf, M., & Craig, S. R. (Eds.). (2010). Medicine between science and religion: Explorations on Tibetan grounds. Berghahn Books. doi:10.3167/9781845457587
- Aziz, B. N. (1978). Tibetan frontier families: Reflections of three generations from D'ing-ri. Carolina Academic Press.
- Barnett, R. (2006). Lhasa: Streets with memories. Columbia University Press. doi:10.7312/barn13680
- Childs, G. (2004). Tibetan diary: From birth to death and beyond in a Himalayan valley of Nepal. University of California Press. doi:10.1525/9780520937840
- Childs, G. (2008). Tibetan transitions: Historical and contemporary perspectives on fertility, family planning, and demographic change. Brill. doi:10.1163/ej.9789004168084.i-323
- Craig, S. R. (2012). Healing elements: Efficacy and the social ecologies of Tibetan medicine. University of California Press. doi:10.1525/9780520951587
- Ekvall, R. B. (1968). Fields on the hoof: Nexus of Tibetan nomadic pastoralism. Holt, Rinehart and Winston.
- Fjeld, H. (2005). Commoners and nobles: Hereditary divisions in Tibet. NIAS Press.
- French, R. R. (1995). The golden yoke: The legal cosmology of Buddhist Tibet. Cornell University Press.
- Goldstein, M. C., & Beall, C. M. (1989). The impact of China's reform policy on the nomads of western Tibet. Asian Survey, 29(6), 619–641. JSTOR 2644756
- Goldstein, M. C., & Beall, C. M. (1990). Nomads of western Tibet: The survival of a way of life. University of California Press.
- Gyatso, J., & Havnevik, H. (Eds.). (2005). Women in Tibet. Columbia University Press.
- Gyatso, J. (2015). Being human in a Buddhist world: An intellectual history of medicine in early modern Tibet. Columbia University Press. doi:10.7312/gyat16496
- Harris, T. (2013). Geographical diversions: Tibetan trade, global transactions. University of Georgia Press. doi:10.1353/book22382
- Hofer, T. (2018). Medicine and memory in Tibet: Amchi physicians in an age of reform. University of Washington Press. doi:10.1515/9780295743004
- Levine, N. E. (1988). The dynamics of polyandry: Kinship, domesticity, and population on the Tibetan border. University of Chicago Press.
- Michael, F. (1982). Rule by incarnation: Tibetan Buddhism and its role in society and state. Westview Press.

=== Women and gender ===
- Diemberger, H. (2016). Tibetan women as patrons of printing and innovation. In H. Diemberger, K. Ehrhard, & P. F. Kornicki (Eds.), Tibetan printing: Comparison, continuities, and change (pp. 267–308). Brill. doi:10.1163/9789004316256_015
- Diemberger, H. (2021). Gender, kinship and relatedness in fifteenth-century Tibet: The biography of Chokyi Dronma (1422–1455) through anthropological eyes. History and Anthropology, 32(2), 211–230. doi:10.1080/02757206.2021.1905244
- Gayley, H. (2016). Love letters from Golok: A tantric couple in modern Tibet. Columbia University Press. doi:10.7312/gayl18052
- Gutschow, K. (2004). Being a Buddhist nun: The struggle for enlightenment in the Himalayas. Harvard University Press. doi:10.4159/9780674038080
- Havnevik, H. (1989). Tibetan Buddhist nuns: History, cultural norms, and social reality. Norwegian University Press.
- Jacoby, S. H. (2014). Love and liberation: Autobiographical writings of the Tibetan Buddhist visionary Sera Khandro. Columbia University Press. doi:10.7312/jaco14768
- Schaeffer, K. R. (2004). Himalayan hermitess: The life of a Tibetan Buddhist nun. Oxford University Press. doi:10.1093/acprof:oso/9780195152999.001.0001
- Taring, R. D. (1970). Daughter of Tibet. John Murray.
- Willis, J. D. (Ed.). (1989). Feminine ground: Essays on women and Tibet. Snow Lion Publications.

=== Arts and culture ===
- Brauen, M. (Ed.). (2005). The Dalai Lamas: A visual history. Serindia Publications.
- Gruschke, A. (2001). The cultural monuments of Tibet's outer provinces: Amdo (Vols. 1–2). White Lotus Press.
- Harris, C. (1999). In the image of Tibet: Tibetan painting after 1959. Reaktion Books.
- Harris, C. E. (2012). The museum on the roof of the world: Art, politics, and the representation of Tibet. University of Chicago Press. doi:10.7208/chicago/9780226317502.001.0001
- Hartley, L. R., & Schiaffini-Vedani, P. (Eds.). (2008). Modern Tibetan literature and social change. Duke University Press. doi:10.1215/9780822381433
- Heller, A. (1999). Tibetan art: Tracing the development of spiritual ideals and art in Tibet, 600–2000 A.D.. Jaca Book; Antique Collectors' Club.
- Jabb, L. (2015). Oral and literary continuities in modern Tibetan literature: The inescapable nation. Lexington Books.
- Jackson, D. P. (1996). A history of Tibetan painting: The great Tibetan painters and their traditions. Verlag der Österreichischen Akademie der Wissenschaften.
- Kossak, S. M., & Singer, J. C. (1998). Sacred visions: Early paintings from central Tibet. Metropolitan Museum of Art.
- Larsen, K., & Sinding-Larsen, A. (2001). The Lhasa atlas: Traditional Tibetan architecture and townscape. Serindia Publications.
- Pal, P. (1983). Art of Tibet: A catalogue of the Los Angeles County Museum of Art collection. Los Angeles County Museum of Art; University of California Press.
- Schaeffer, K. R. (2009). The culture of the book in Tibet. Columbia University Press. doi:10.7312/scha14716

=== Language ===
- Beyer, S. V. (1992). The classical Tibetan language. State University of New York Press. doi:10.1515/9780791496695
- Denwood, P. (1999). Tibetan. John Benjamins. doi:10.1075/loall.3
- Hill, N. W. (2019). The historical phonology of Tibetan, Burmese, and Chinese. Cambridge University Press. doi:10.1017/9781316550939
- Human Rights Watch (4 March 2020). "China's "bilingual education" policy in Tibet: Tibetan-medium schooling under threat". Human Rights Watch.
- Roche, G., & Suzuki, H. (2018). Tibet's minority languages: Diversity and endangerment. Modern Asian Studies, 52(4), 1227–1278. doi:10.1017/s0026749x1600072x
- Tournadre, N., & Dorje, S. (2003). Manual of standard Tibetan: Language and civilization (C. Ramble, Trans.). Snow Lion Publications.
- Tournadre, N. (2013). The Tibetic languages and their classification. In T. Owen-Smith & N. Hill (Eds.), Trans-Himalayan linguistics: Historical and descriptive linguistics of the Himalayan area (pp. 105–130). De Gruyter. doi:10.1515/9783110310832.105
- Tsung, L. (2014). Language power and hierarchy: Multilingual education in China. Bloomsbury Academic. doi:10.5040/9781472593627
- Zhang, L., & Tsung, L. T. H. (2018). Tibetan bilingual education in Qinghai: Government policy vs family language practice. International Journal of Bilingual Education and Bilingualism, 22(3), 290–302. doi:10.1080/13670050.2018.1503226

== Historiography ==
- Anand, D. (2007). Geopolitical exotica: Tibet in Western imagination. University of Minnesota Press.
- Bishop, P. (1989). The myth of Shangri-La: Tibet, travel writing and the Western creation of sacred landscape. University of California Press.
- Blondeau, A.-M., & Buffetrille, K. (Eds.). (2008). Authenticating Tibet: Answers to China's 100 questions. University of California Press. doi:10.1525/9780520355163
- Cathcart, A. (2017). Tethering Tibet: Recent Chinese historiography and Liu Shengqi in Lhasa, 1945–1949. Asian Affairs, 48(1), 75–89. doi:10.1080/03068374.2016.1269478
- Information Office of the State Council of the People's Republic of China. (2015). Tibet's path of development is driven by an irresistible historical tide.
- Information Office of the State Council of the People's Republic of China. (2021). Tibet since 1951: Liberation, development and prosperity.
- Information Office of the State Council of the People's Republic of China. (2023). CPC policies on the governance of Xizang in the new era: Approach and achievements.
- Lopez, D. S., Jr. (1998). Prisoners of Shangri-La: Tibetan Buddhism and the West. University of Chicago Press.
- Martin, D., & Bentor, Y. (1997). Tibetan histories: A bibliography of Tibetan-language historical works. Serindia Publications.
- McKay, A. (Ed.). (2003). The history of Tibet (Vols. 1–3). RoutledgeCurzon.
- Powers, J. (2004). History as propaganda: Tibetan exiles versus the People's Republic of China. Oxford University Press. doi:10.1093/0195174267.001.0001
- Powers, J., & Templeman, D. (2012). Historical dictionary of Tibet. Scarecrow Press. doi:10.5040/9798216433118
- Ryavec, K. E. (2015). A historical atlas of Tibet. University of Chicago Press.
- Sperling, E. (2009). Tibet and China: The interpretation of history since 1950. China Perspectives, 2009(3). doi:10.4000/chinaperspectives.4839
- Wang, J., & Nyima Gyaincain. (1997). The historical status of China's Tibet. China Intercontinental Press.

== Primary sources ==
- Bu-ston. (1931). History of Buddhism (Chos-ḥbyung) (E. Obermiller, Trans.; Vols. 1–2). O. Harrassowitz.
- Chimpa, L., & Chattopadhyaya, A. (Trans.). (1970). Tāranātha's history of Buddhism in India (D. Chattopadhyaya, Ed.). Indian Institute of Advanced Study.
- Dudjom Rinpoche, Jikdrel Yeshe Dorje. (1991). The Nyingma school of Tibetan Buddhism: Its fundamentals and history (G. Dorje & M. Kapstein, Trans. & Eds.; Vols. 1–2). Wisdom Publications.
- Gźon-nu-dpal, 'Gos Lo-tsā-ba. (1949–1953). The blue annals (G. N. Roerich, Trans.; Vols. 1–2). Royal Asiatic Society of Bengal.
- Takeuchi, T. (1995). Old Tibetan contracts from Central Asia. Daizo Shuppan.
- Thomas, F. W. (Ed. & Trans.). (1935–1963). Tibetan literary texts and documents concerning Chinese Turkestan (Vols. 1–4). Royal Asiatic Society.
- Tucci, G. (Ed. & Trans.). (1971). Deb t'er dmar po gsar ma: Tibetan chronicles by bSod nams grags pa (Vol. 1). Istituto Italiano per il Medio ed Estremo Oriente.

== Academic journals ==
- Bulletin of Tibetology. (1964–present). Namgyal Institute of Tibetology. Official website.
- China Tibetology. (2003–present). China Tibetology Research Center. ISSN 1671-6043 (print).
- Journal of Tibetan Literature. (2022–present). ISSN 2834-2801 (online). Official website.
- Revue d'Études Tibétaines. (2002–present). CNRS. ISSN 1768-2959 (online). Online edition (Digital Himalaya).
- The Tibet Journal. (1975–present). Library of Tibetan Works and Archives. ISSN 0970-5368 (print). Official website. Archive: JSTOR.
- Yeshe: A Journal of Tibetan Literature, Arts and Humanities. (2021–present). Tibetan Arts and Literature Initiative. ISSN 2768-4261 (online). Official website.
