= Bibliography of the 1989 Tiananmen Square protests and massacre =

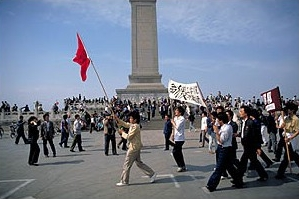
- Protesters in Tiananmen Square, 2 June 1989
- Subject: 1989 Tiananmen Square protests and massacre
- Scope: Books, journal articles, primary sources
- Period covered: 15 April – 4 June 1989
- Languages: English
- Related: Bibliography of Chinese history; Bibliography of the Cold War

Bibliography of the 1989 Tiananmen Square protests and massacre is a list of English-language books and scholarly articles on the 1989 Tiananmen Square protests, the military suppression of the movement on 3–4 June 1989, and its aftermath.

Protests led by students and workers, known in China as the June Fourth Incident, (Note: Chinese: 六四事件; pinyin: liùsì shìjiàn) were held in Tiananmen Square in Beijing, China, from 15 April to 4 June 1989. After weeks of failed efforts by the demonstrators and the Chinese government to reach a peaceful resolution, the government declared martial law on 20 May and deployed troops to occupy the square on the night of 3 June, in what became known as the Tiananmen Square massacre. The events are also called the '89 Democracy Movement, (Note: Chinese: 八九民运; pinyin: Bājiǔ mínyùn) the Tiananmen Square Incident, (Note: Chinese: 天安门事件; pinyin: Tiān'ānmén shìjiàn) or the Tiananmen uprising.

This bibliography contains academic-level English-language books (including translations) and journal articles. Entries are organized by subject: documents and primary sources; memoirs and eyewitness accounts by participants and foreign journalists; the political and economic background of the reform era; studies of the protest movement as a whole, of the students, and of workers and the movement outside Beijing; the military suppression; and the aftermath of the massacre and its place in public memory. Book entries may have references to reviews published in academic journals or major newspapers when these could be considered helpful. These reference reviews also function as a resource to find other works on this subject.

Works listed here are cited in the notes or bibliographies of scholarly sources. Each is published by an academic or major trade press, written by a recognized expert, or substantially reviewed in scholarly journals; borderline cases are omitted. A selection of primary sources is included. Many of the books below carry their own bibliographies; see the External links section for archives and document collections.

Citations follow APA style. (Note: Entries are in plain text APA 7 format without templates; templates are used only for reviews and notes.) Books have citations to academic journal or mainstream published reviews when available. For books only partly about the subject, relevant chapter or section titles are given where useful and available. Translators of the original-language edition are included when possible. In cases where a title or name has appeared with more than one English spelling, the most recent published form is used and a footnote documents any earlier title under which the work appeared.

== Background ==
- Baum, R. (1994). Burying Mao: Chinese politics in the age of Deng Xiaoping. Princeton University Press.
- Ding, X. L. (1994). The decline of communism in China: Legitimacy crisis, 1977–1989. Cambridge University Press.
- Dittmer, L. (1990). China in 1989: The crisis of incomplete reform. Asian Survey, 30(1), 25–41. JSTOR 2644770
- Fewsmith, J. (1994). Dilemmas of reform in China: Political conflict and economic debate. M. E. Sharpe.
- Goldman, M. (1994). Sowing the seeds of democracy in China: Political reform in the Deng Xiaoping era. Harvard University Press.
- Link, P. (1992). Evening chats in Beijing: Probing China's predicament. W. W. Norton.
- Nathan, A. J. (1990). China's crisis: Dilemmas of reform and prospects for democracy. Columbia University Press.

== The protest movement ==
- Black, G., & Munro, R. (1993). Black hands of Beijing: Lives of defiance in China's democracy movement. Wiley.
- Brown, J. (2021). June Fourth: The Tiananmen protests and Beijing massacre of 1989. Cambridge University Press.
- Calhoun, C. (1989). Revolution and repression in Tiananmen Square. Society, 26(6), 21–38. doi:10.1007/bf02700237
- Calhoun, C. (1994). Neither gods nor emperors: Students and the struggle for democracy in China. University of California Press.
- Des Forges, R. V., Luo, N., & Wu, Y.-b. (Eds.). (1993). Chinese democracy and the crisis of 1989: Chinese and American reflections. State University of New York Press.
- Esherick, J. W., & Wasserstrom, J. N. (1990). Acting out democracy: Political theater in modern China. The Journal of Asian Studies, 49(4), 835–865. JSTOR 2058238
- Feigon, L. (1990). China rising: The meaning of Tiananmen. Ivan R. Dee.
- Hershkovitz, L. (1993). Tiananmen Square and the politics of place. Political Geography, 12(5), 395–420. doi:10.1016/0962-6298(93)90010-5
- Li, P., Mark, S., & Li, M. H. (Eds.). (1991). Culture and politics in China: An anatomy of Tiananmen Square. Transaction.
- Ogden, S., Hartford, K., Sullivan, L., & Zweig, D. (Eds.). (1992). China's search for democracy: The student and mass movement of 1989. M. E. Sharpe.
- Pye, L. W. (1990). Tiananmen and Chinese political culture: The escalation of confrontation from moralizing to revenge. Asian Survey, 30(4), 331–347. JSTOR 2644711
- Saich, T. (1990). The rise and fall of the Beijing people's movement. The Australian Journal of Chinese Affairs, 24, 181–208. JSTOR 2158894
- Saich, T. (Ed.). (1990). The Chinese people's movement: Perspectives on spring 1989. M. E. Sharpe.
- Wasserstrom, J. N., & Perry, E. J. (Eds.). (1992). Popular protest and political culture in modern China: Learning from 1989. Westview Press.

=== Students ===
- Wright, T. (2001). The perils of protest: State repression and student activism in China and Taiwan. University of Hawaii Press.
- Zhao, D. (1997). Decline of political control in Chinese universities and the rise of the 1989 Chinese student movement. Sociological Perspectives, 40(2), 159–182. JSTOR 1389520
- Zhao, D. (1998). Ecologies of social movements: Student mobilization during the 1989 prodemocracy movement in Beijing. American Journal of Sociology, 103(6), 1493–1529. doi:10.1086/231399
- Zhao, D. (2001). The power of Tiananmen: State-society relations and the 1989 Beijing student movement. University of Chicago Press.
- Zuo, J., & Benford, R. D. (1995). Mobilization processes and the 1989 Chinese democracy movement. The Sociological Quarterly, 36(1), 131–156. doi:10.1111/j.1533-8525.1995.tb02324.x

=== Workers ===
- Chan, A., & Unger, J. (1990). Voices from the protest movement, Chongqing, Sichuan. The Australian Journal of Chinese Affairs, 24, 259–279. JSTOR 2158898
- Esherick, J. W. (1990). Xi'an spring. The Australian Journal of Chinese Affairs, 24, 209–235. JSTOR 2158895
- Unger, J. (Ed.). (1991). The pro-democracy protests in China: Reports from the provinces. M. E. Sharpe.
- Walder, A. G., & Gong, X. (1993). Workers in the Tiananmen protests: The politics of the Beijing Workers' Autonomous Federation. The Australian Journal of Chinese Affairs, 29, 1–29. JSTOR 2949950

== Military action ==
- Brook, T. (1992). Quelling the people: The military suppression of the Beijing democracy movement. Oxford University Press.
- Scobell, A. (1992). Why the People's Army fired on the people: The Chinese military and Tiananmen. Armed Forces & Society, 18(2), 193–213. doi:10.1177/0095327x9201800203

== Aftermath ==
- Béja, J.-P. (Ed.). (2011). The impact of China's 1989 Tiananmen massacre. Routledge.
- Hicks, G. (Ed.). (1990). The broken mirror: China after Tiananmen. Longman.
- Kristof, N. D., & WuDunn, S. (1994). China wakes: The struggle for the soul of a rising power. Times Books.
- Schell, O. (1994). Mandate of heaven: A new generation of entrepreneurs, dissidents, bohemians, and technocrats lays claim to China's future. Simon & Schuster.

== Historiography and memory ==
=== Historiography ===
- Chan, A. L., & Nathan, A. J. (2004). The Tiananmen Papers revisited. The China Quarterly, 177, 190–214. doi:10.1017/s0305741004000116
- Kluver, R. (2010). Rhetorical trajectories of Tiananmen Square. Diplomatic History, 34(1), 71–94. doi:10.1111/j.1467-7709.2009.00833.x
- Moody, P. R. (2002). Tiananmen: The papers and the story. The Review of Politics, 64(1), 149–165. doi:10.1017/s0034670500031648
- Nathan, A. J. (2001). The Tiananmen Papers: An editor's reflections. The China Quarterly, 167, 724–737. doi:10.1017/s0009443901000407
- Wu, H. (1991). Tiananmen Square: A political history of monuments. Representations, 35, 84–117. JSTOR 2928718
- Wu, H. (2005). Remaking Beijing: Tiananmen Square and the creation of a political space. Reaktion Books.

=== Memory studies ===
- Cheng, E. W., & Yuen, S. (2019). Memory in movement: Collective identity and memory contestation in Hong Kong's Tiananmen vigils. Mobilization: An International Quarterly, 24(4), 419–437. doi:10.17813/1086-671x-24-4-419
- Chung, R. W.-m., & Fu, K.-w. (2021). Tweets and memories: Chinese censors come after me. Forbidden voices of the 1989 Tiananmen Square massacre on Sina Weibo, 2012–2018. Journal of Contemporary China, 31(134), 319–334. doi:10.1080/10670564.2021.1945742
- Hillenbrand, M. (2020). Negative exposures: Knowing what not to know in contemporary China. Duke University Press.
- Ho, M.-s. (2020). Changing memory of the Tiananmen Incident in Taiwan: From patriotism to universal values (1989–2019). China Information, 36(1), 90–111. doi:10.1177/0920203x20971454
- Hubbert, J. (2014). Appropriating iconicity: Why Tank Man still matters. Visual Anthropology Review, 30(2), 114–126. doi:10.1111/var.12042
- Lee, F. L. F., & Chan, J. M. (2016). Collective memory mobilization and Tiananmen commemoration in Hong Kong. Media, Culture & Society, 38(7), 997–1014. doi:10.1177/0163443716635864
- Lee, F. L. F., & Chan, J. M. (2018). Memory mobilization, generational differences, and communication effects on collective memory about Tiananmen in Hong Kong. Asian Journal of Communication, 28(4), 397–415. doi:10.1080/01292986.2018.1425465
- Lee, F. L. F., & Chan, J. M. (2021). Memories of Tiananmen: Politics and processes of collective remembering in Hong Kong, 1989–2019. Amsterdam University Press.
- Li, H., & Lee, C.-C. (2013). Remembering Tiananmen and the Berlin Wall: The elite U.S. press's anniversary journalism, 1990–2009. Media, Culture & Society, 35(7), 830–846. doi:10.1177/0163443713495077
- Lim, L. (2014). The People's Republic of Amnesia: Tiananmen revisited. Oxford University Press.
- Link, P. (2009). June 4th: Memory and ethics. China Perspectives, 2009(2), 4–16. doi:10.4000/chinaperspectives.4797
- Thurston, A. F. (1999). Memory and mourning: China ten years after Tiananmen. SAIS Review, 19(2), 61–79. doi:10.1353/sais.1999.0050
- Tiffert, G. (2019). 30 years after Tiananmen: Memory in the era of Xi Jinping. Journal of Democracy, 30(2), 38–49. doi:10.1353/jod.2019.0022
- Xu, B. (2020). Listening to thunder in the silence on Tiananmen: Politics and ethics of the memory of the June Fourth Movement. China Information, 36(1), 68–89. doi:10.1177/0920203x20956561

== Primary sources ==
- Han, M. (Ed.). (1990). Cries for democracy: Writings and speeches from the 1989 Chinese democracy movement. Princeton University Press.
- Human Rights in China. (1990). Children of the dragon: The story of Tiananmen Square. Collier Books.
- Liao, Y. (2019). Bullets and opium: Real-life stories of China after the Tiananmen Square massacre (D. Cowhig, J. Cowhig, & R. Perlin, Trans.). Atria/One Signal.
- Liu, X. (2012). June Fourth elegies (J. Yang, Trans.). Graywolf Press.
- Mok, C. Y., & Harrison, J. F. (Eds.). (1990). Voices from Tiananmen Square: Beijing spring and the democracy movement. Black Rose Books.
- Oksenberg, M., Sullivan, L. R., & Lambert, M. (Eds.). (1990). Beijing spring, 1989: Confrontation and conflict: The basic documents. M. E. Sharpe.

=== Government documents ===
- Che, M. (1990). Beijing turmoil: More than meets the eye. Foreign Languages Press.
- The June turbulence in Beijing. (1989). New Star Publishers.
- Zhang, L. (Comp.), Nathan, A. J., & Link, P. (Eds.). (2001). The Tiananmen papers. PublicAffairs.

=== Memoirs ===
- Chai, L. (2011). A heart for freedom. Tyndale House.
- Cunningham, P. J. (2009). Tiananmen moon: Inside the Chinese student uprising of 1989. Rowman & Littlefield.
- Fathers, M., & Higgins, A. (1989). Tiananmen: The rape of Peking (R. Cottrell, Ed.). Independent in association with Doubleday.
- Li, L. (1990). Moving the mountain: My life in China. Macmillan.
- Salisbury, H. E. (1989). Tiananmen diary: Thirteen days in June. Little, Brown.
- Shen, T., & Yen, M. (1990). Almost a revolution. Houghton Mifflin.
- Simmie, S., & Nixon, B. (1989). Tiananmen Square. University of Washington Press.
- Zhang, B. (2002). Escape from China: The long journey from Tiananmen to freedom (K. K. Low, Trans.). Washington Square Press.
- Zhao, Z. (2009). Prisoner of the state: The secret journal of Premier Zhao Ziyang (P. Bao, R. Chiang, & A. Ignatius, Eds. & Trans.). Simon & Schuster.

== See also ==
- 1989 Tiananmen Square protests and massacre
- Tank Man
- The Tiananmen Papers
