= Bibliography of Chinese history =

This bibliography covers the English language scholarship of major studies in Chinese history.

== Surveys ==
- Cheng, Linsun (2009). Berkshire Encyclopedia of China. Great Barrington, Mass.: Berkshire Pub. Group. ISBN 978-1933782683.
- Dardess, John W. (2010). Governing China, 150–1850. Hackett Publishing. ISBN 978-1-60384-311-9.
- Ebrey, Patricia Buckley (2010). The Cambridge Illustrated History of China. Cambridge: Cambridge University Press. ISBN 978-0521196208.
- Fairbank, John King and Goldman, Merle. China: A New History. 2nd ed. Harvard U. Press, (2006). 640 pp.
- Gernet, Jacques, J. R. Foster, and Charles Hartman. A History of Chinese Civilization (1996). One-volume survey.
- Hsu, Cho-yun. China: A New Cultural History (Columbia University Press; 2012) 612 pp; stress on China's encounters with successive waves of globalization.
- Hsü, Immanuel Chung-yueh. The Rise of Modern China, 6th ed. (Oxford University Press, 1999). Detailed coverage of 1644–1999, 1136 pp.
- Huang, Ray. China, a Macro History (1997) 335 pp. A personal, essayistic approach.
- Jaivin, Linda, The Shortest History of China, US Books, 2021 (ISBN 978-1-61519-820-7).
- Keay, John. China: A History (2009), 642 pp.
- Mote, Frederick W. Imperial China, 900–1800 Harvard University Press, 1999, 1,136 pp. Authoritative treatment of the Song, Yuan, Ming, and Qing dynasties.
- Perkins, Dorothy. Encyclopedia of China: The Essential Reference to China, Its History and Culture. Facts on File, 1999. 662 pp.
- Roberts, J. A. G. A Concise History of China. Harvard U. Press, 1999. 341 pp.
- Schoppa, R. Keith. The Columbia Guide to Modern Chinese History. Columbia U. Press, 2000. 356 pp.
- Spence, Jonathan D. The Search for Modern China (1999), 876 pp; survey from 1644 to 1990s
- Wang, Ke-wen, ed. Modern China: An Encyclopedia of History, Culture, and Nationalism. Garland, 1998. 442 pp.
- Wang, David Der-wei. A New Literary History of Modern China (2017)
- Wright, David Curtis. History of China (2001) 257 pp.
- Wills, Jr., John E. Mountain of Fame: Portraits in Chinese History (1994) Biographical essays on important figures.

== Prehistory ==
- Chang, Kwang-chih. The Archaeology of Ancient China, Yale University Press, 1986.
- Discovery of residue from fermented beverage consumed up to 9,000 years ago in Jiahu, Henan Province, China. By Dr. Patrick E McGovern, University of Pennsylvania archaeochemist and colleagues from China, Great Britain and Germany.
- Zhu, Rixiang; Zhisheng An; Richard Potts; Kenneth A. Hoffman (2003). "Magnetostratigraphic dating of early humans in China" (PDF). Earth-Science Reviews. 61 (3): 341. Bibcode:2003ESRv...61..341Z. doi:10.1016/S0012-8252(02)00132-0. Archived from the original (PDF) on 24 July 2011.
- The Discovery of Early Pottery in China by Zhang Chi, Department of Archaeology, Peking University, China.

== Shang dynasty ==
- Durant, Stephen W. The Cloudy Mirror: Tension and Conflict in the Writings of Sima Qian (1995).

== Zhou dynasty ==
- Beckwith, Christopher I. (16 March 2009). Empires of the Silk Road: A History of Central Eurasia from the Bronze Age to the Present. Princeton University Press. ISBN 978-1400829941.
- Khayutina, Maria (2003), "Where Was the Western Zhou Capital?", The Warring States Working Group, WSWG-17, Leiden, Germany: Warring States Project, p. 14, archived from the original on 2010-05-29
- Shaughnessy, Edward L. (1999), "Western Zhou History", in Loewe, Michael; Shaughnessy, Edward L. (eds.), The Cambridge History of Ancient China, pp. 292–351, ISBN 978-0-521-47030-8

== Qin dynasty ==
- Bodde, Derk (1986). "The State and Empire of Ch'in". In Twitchett, Denis; Loewe, Michael (eds.). The Cambridge History of China, Volume I: the Ch'in and Han Empires, 221 B.C. – A.D. 220. Cambridge: Cambridge University Press. ISBN 978-0-521-24327-8.
- Lewis, Mark Edward (2007). The Early Chinese Empires: Qin and Han. History of Imperial China Series. Cambridge, Massachusetts: Belknap Press of Harvard University Press. ISBN 978-0674024779.

== Han dynasty ==
- de Crespigny, Rafe. 1972. The Ch'iang Barbarians and the Empire of Han: A Study in Frontier Policy. Papers on Far Eastern History 16, Australian National University. Canberra.
- de Crespigny, Rafe. 1984. Northern Frontier. The Policies and Strategies of the Later Han Empire. Rafe de Crespigny. 1984. Faculty of Asian Studies, Australian National University. Canberra.
- de Crespigny, Rafe (1990). "South China under the Later Han Dynasty". Asian Studies Monographs. New Series (16). Chapter One from Generals of the South: the Foundation and early history of the Three Kingdoms state of Wu. Archived from the original on 16 November 2010.
- de Crespigny, Rafe (1996). "Later Han Military Administration: An Outline of the Military Administration of the Later Han Empire". Asian Studies Monographs. New Series (21) (Based on the Introduction to Emperor Huan and Emperor Ling being the Chronicle of Later Han for the years 189 to 220 AD as recorded in Chapters 59 to 69 of the Zizhi tongjian of Sima Guang ed.). Archived from the original on 28 May 2011.
- Dubs, Homer H. 1938–55. The History of the Former Han Dynasty by Pan Ku. (3 vol)
- Hill, John E. (2009) Through the Jade Gate to Rome: A Study of the Silk Routes during the Later Han Dynasty, 1st to 2nd centuries CE. ISBN 978-1-4392-2134-1.
- Hulsewé, A. F. P. and Loewe, M. A. N., eds. China in Central Asia: The Early Stage 125 B.C. – A.D. 23: an annotated translation of chapters 61 and 96 of the History of the Former Han Dynasty. (1979)
- Twitchett, Denis and Loewe, Michael, eds. 1986. The Cambridge History of China. Volume I. The Ch'in and Han Empires, 221 B.C. – a.d. 220. Cambridge University Press.
- Yap, Joseph P. (2009) Wars With the Xiongnu – A Translation From Zizhi tongjian, AuthorHouse. ISBN 1-4900-0604-4

== Jin, the Sixteen Kingdoms, and the Northern and Southern dynasties ==
- de Crespigny, Rafe (1991). "The Three Kingdoms and Western Jin: A History of China in the Third Century AD". East Asian History (1 June 1991, pp. 1–36, & no. 2 December 1991, pp. 143–164). Archived from the original on 26 April 2012.
- Lewis, Mark Edward (2009). China between Empires: The Northern and Southern Dynasties. Cambridge, Massachusetts: Belknap Press of Harvard University Press. ISBN 978-0674040151.

== Sui dynasty ==
- Wright, Arthur F. 1978. The Sui Dynasty. Alfred A. Knopf, New York. ISBN 0-394-49187-4, ISBN 0-394-32332-7 (pbk).

== Tang dynasty ==
- Benn, Charles. 2002. China's Golden Age: Everyday Life in the Tang Dynasty. Oxford University Press. ISBN 0-19-517665-0.
- Lewis, Mark Edward. 2012. China's Cosmopolitan Empire: The Tang Dynasty (2012). excerpt; A standard scholarly survey.
- Schafer, Edward H. 1967. The Vermilion Bird: T'ang Images of the South. University of California Press, Berkeley and Los Angeles. Reprint 1985. ISBN 0-520-05462-8.
- Wang, Zhenping. 1991. "T'ang Maritime Trade Administration." Wang Zhenping. Asia Major, Third Series, Vol. IV, 1991, pp. 7–38.

== Liao dynasty ==
- Standen, Naomi. 2004. Unbounded loyalty: Frontier crossing in Liao China. University of Hawaii Press. ISBN 978-0-824-82983-4.

== Song dynasty ==
- Chaffee, John W. and Denis Twitchett, eds. Cambridge History of China, Vol. 5 Part 2 The Five Dynasties and Sung China, 960–1279 AD (2015).
- Ebrey, Patricia. The Inner Quarters: Marriage and the Lives of Chinese Women in the Sung Period (1990)
- Gernet, Jacques (1962). Daily Life in China, on the Eve of the Mongol Invasion, 1250–1276. translated by Wright, H. M. Stanford, CA: Stanford University Press. ISBN 978-0804707206.
- Hymes, Robert, and Conrad Schirokauer, eds. Ordering the World: Approaches to State and Society in Sung Dynasty China, U of California Press, 1993; complete text online free
- Kuhn, Dieter (2009). The Age of Confucian Rule: The Song Transformation of China. Cambridge, Massachusetts: Belknap Press of Harvard University Press. ISBN 978-0674031463.
- Shiba, Yoshinobu. 1970. Commerce and Society in Sung China. Originally published in Japanese as So-dai sho-gyo – shi kenkyu-. Tokyo, Kazama shobo-, 1968. Yoshinobu Shiba. Translation by Mark Elvin, Centre for Chinese Studies, University of Michigan.

== Yuan dynasty ==
- Brook, Timothy (2010). The Troubled Empire: China in the Yuan and Ming Dynasties. Cambridge, Massachusetts: Belknap Press of Harvard University Press. ISBN 978-0-674-04602-3.

== Ming dynasty ==
- Brook, Timothy. The Confusions of Pleasure: Commerce and Culture in Ming China. (1998).
- —— (2010). The Troubled Empire: China in the Yuan and Ming Dynasties. Cambridge, Massachusetts: Belknap Press of Harvard University Press. ISBN 978-0-674-04602-3. 329 pages. Focus on the impact of a Little Ice Age on the empire, as the empire, beginning with a sharp drop in temperatures in the 13th century during which time the Mongol leader Kublai Khan moved south into China.
- Dardess, John W. A Ming Society: T'ai-ho County, Kiangsi, Fourteenth to Seventeenth Centuries. (1983); uses advanced "new social history" complete text online free
- Farmer, Edward. Zhu Yuanzhang and Early Ming Legislation: The Reordering of Chinese Society Following the Era of Mongol Rule. E.J. Brill, 1995.
- Goodrich, L. Carrington, and Chaoying Fang. Dictionary of Ming Biography. (1976).
- Huang, Ray. 1587, A Year of No Significance: The Ming Dynasty in Decline. (1981).
- Mote, Frederick W., and Denis Twitchett, eds. The Cambridge History of China. Vol. 7, part 1: The Ming Dynasty, 1368–1644 (1988). 1008 pp. excerpt and text search
- ——The Cambridge History of China. Vol. 8: The Ming Dynasty, 1368–1644, Part 2. (1998). 1203 pp.
- Schneewind, Sarah. A Tale of Two Melons: Emperor and Subject in Ming China. (2006).
- Tsai, Shih-shan Henry. Perpetual Happiness: The Ming Emperor Yongle. (2001).

== Qing dynasty ==
- Arthur W. Hummel. Eminent Chinese of the Ch'ing Period (1644–1912). (Washington: Library of Congress. Orientalia, Division; U.S. Government Printing Office, 1943). 2 vols. Reprinted: Berkshire, 2016. 800 still generally reliable biographical articles, a number of which are online: Qing Research Portal.
- Fairbank, John K. and Liu, Kwang-Ching, ed. The Cambridge History of China. Vol. 2: Late Ch'ing, 1800–1911, Part 2. Cambridge U. Press, 1980. 754 pp.
- Mann, Susan. Precious Records: Women in China's Long Eighteenth Century (1997)
- Naquin, Susan, and Evelyn S. Rawski. Chinese Society in the Eighteenth Century (1989) excerpt and text search
- Peterson, Willard J., ed. The Cambridge History of China. Vol. 9, Part 1: The Ch'ing Dynasty to 1800. Cambridge U. Press, 2002. 753 pp.
- Rawski, Evelyn S. The Last Emperors: A Social History of Qing Imperial Institutions (2001)
- Rowe, William T. (2009). China's Last Empire: The Great Qing. Cambridge, Massachusetts: Harvard University Press. ISBN 978-0674036123.
- Smith, Richard J. (2015). The Qing Dynasty and Traditional Chinese Culture. Lanham: Rowman & Littlefield. ISBN 978-1-4422-2194-9.
- Struve, Lynn A., ed. The Qing Formation in World-Historical Time. (2004). 412 pp.
- Struve, Lynn A., ed. Voices from the Ming-Qing Cataclysm: China in Tigers' Jaws (1998)

== Nationalist era (1912–present) ==
=== Biographies ===
- Bergère, Marie-Claire. Sun Yat-Sen (1998), 480 pp. Standard biography
- Boorman, Howard L., et al., eds. Biographical Dictionary of Republican China. (Vol. I-IV and Index. 1967–1979). 600 short scholarly biographies excerpt and text search. Online at Internet Archive.
- Taylor, Jay. The Generalissimo: Chiang Kai-shek and the Struggle for Modern China. (2009) ISBN 978-0-674-03338-2

=== General histories ===
- Chan, F. Gilbert; Etzold, Thomas H., eds. (1976). China in the 1920s: nationalism and revolution. A History of modern China. New York: New Viewpoints. ISBN 978-0-531-05383-6.
- Dreyer, Edward L. China at War, 1901–1949. (1995). 422 pp.
- Eastman Lloyd. Seeds of Destruction: Nationalist China in War and Revolution, 1937– 1945. (1984)
- Eastman Lloyd et al. The Nationalist Era in China, 1927–1949 (1991)
- Ebrey, Patricia (1996), "Surnames and Han Chinese Identity", in Melissa J. Brown, Negotiating Ethnicities in China and Taiwan, Berkeley, CA: University of California Press, ISBN 1557290482.
- Edmondson, Robert (2002), "The February 28 Incident and National Identity", in Stephane Corcuff, Momories of the Future:National Identity Issues and the Search for a New Taiwan, New York: M.E. Sharpe.
- Fairbank, John K., ed. The Cambridge History of China, Vol. 12, Republican China 1912–1949. Part 1. (1983). 1001 pp.
- --- and Feuerwerker, Albert, eds. The Cambridge History of China. Vol. 13: Republican China, 1912–1949, Part 2. (1986). 1092 pp.
- Fogel, Joshua A. The Nanjing Massacre in History and Historiography (2000)
- Gordon, David M. "The China-Japan War, 1931–1945," The Journal of Military History v70#1 (2006) 137–182. Overview of important books and interpretations; online
- Hsiung, James C. and Steven I. Levine, eds. China's Bitter Victory: The War with Japan, 1937–1945 (1992). Survey essays.
- Hsi-sheng, Ch'i. Nationalist China at War: Military Defeats and Political Collapse, 1937–1945 (1982)
- Mitter, Rana. Forgotten Ally: China's World War II, 1937–1945. (Boston: Houghton Mifflin Harcourt, 2013). ISBN 978-0618894253.
- Manthorpe, Jonathan (2008), Forbidden Nation: A History of Taiwan, Palgrave Macmillan.
- Mitter, Rana. A Bitter Revolution : China's Struggle with the Modern World. (Oxford; New York: Oxford University Press, 2004). ISBN 0192803417.
- Hung, Chang-tai. War and Popular Culture: Resistance in Modern China, 1937–1945 (1994) complete text online free
- Lary, Diana. The Chinese People at War: Human Suffering and Social Transformation, 1937–1945 (2010)
- James E. Sheridan, China in Disintegration: The Republican Era in Chinese History, 1912–1949 (New York: Free Press; The Transformation of Modern China Series, 1975)
- Shiroyama, Tomoko. China during the Great Depression: Market, State, and the World Economy, 1929–1937 (2008).
- Shuyun, Sun. The Long March: The True History of Communist China's Founding Myth (2007)
- Westad, Odd Arne. Decisive Encounters: The Chinese Civil War, 1946–1950. (2003). 413 pp. A standard history.

=== Foreign relations ===
- Wilbur, C. Martin; How, Julie Lien-ying (1989). Missionaries of revolution: Soviet advisers and Nationalist China, 1920-1927. Studies of the East Asian Institute, Columbia University. Cambridge, Mass: Harvard University Press. ISBN 978-0-674-57652-0.

== Communist era (1949–present) ==
- Barnouin, Barbara, and Yu Changgen. Zhou Enlai: A Political Life (2005)
- Davin, Delia (2013). Mao: A Very Short Introduction. Oxford UP. ISBN 978-0191654039.
- Garver, John W. China's Quest: The History of the Foreign Relations of the People's Republic (2nd ed. 2016)
- Gao, Wenqian (2007). Zhou Enlai: The Last Perfect Revolutionary. Translated by Rand, Peter and Lawrence R. Sullivan. NY: Public Affairs. ISBN 978-1-58648-415-6. Both sympathetic and critical.
- Kirby, William C.; Ross, Robert S.; and Gong, Li, eds. Normalization of U.S.-China Relations: An International History. (2005). 376 pp.
- Li, Xiaobing. A History of the Modern Chinese Army (2007)
- MacFarquhar, Roderick and Fairbank, John K., eds. The Cambridge History of China. Vol. 15: The People's Republic, Part 2: Revolutions within the Chinese Revolution, 1966–1982. Cambridge U. Press, 1992. 1108 pp.
- Meisner, Maurice. Mao's China and After: A History of the People's Republic, 3rd ed. (Free Press, 1999), dense book with theoretical and political science approach.
- Pantsov, Alexander and Steven I. Levine. Deng Xiaoping : A Revolutionary Life. Oxford University Press, 2015). ISBN 978-0199392032.
- Pantsov, Alexander, With Steven I Levine. Mao: The Real Story. (New York: Simon & Schuster, 2012). ISBN 978-1451654479.
- Ross, John. China's Great Road: Lessons for Marxist Theory and Socialist Practices. (Praxis Press, 2021) ISBN 978-1899155118.
- Spence, Jonathan. Mao Zedong (1999)
- Walder, Andrew G. China under Mao: A Revolution Derailed (Harvard University Press, 2015) 413 pp. online review
- Wang, Jing. High Culture Fever: Politics, Aesthetics, and Ideology in Deng's China (1996) complete text online free

=== Cultural Revolution, 1966–76 ===
- Clark, Paul. The Chinese Cultural Revolution: A History (2008), a favorable look at artistic production excerpt and text search
- Esherick, Joseph W.; Pickowicz, Paul G.; and Walder, Andrew G., eds. The Chinese Cultural Revolution as History. (2006). 382 pp.
- Jian, Guo; Song, Yongyi; and Zhou, Yuan. Historical Dictionary of the Chinese Cultural Revolution. (2006). 433 pp.
- Richard Curt Kraus. The Cultural Revolution: A Very Short Introduction. (New York: Oxford University Press, Very Short Introductions Series, 2012). ISBN 978-0199740550.
- MacFarquhar, Roderick and Fairbank, John K., eds. The Cambridge History of China. Vol. 15: The People's Republic, Part 2: Revolutions within the Chinese Revolution, 1966–1982. Cambridge U. Press, 1992. 1108 pp.
- MacFarquhar, Roderick and Michael Schoenhals. Mao's Last Revolution. (2006).
- MacFarquhar, Roderick. The Origins of the Cultural Revolution. Vol. 3: The Coming of the Cataclysm, 1961–1966. (1998). 733 pp.
- Yan, Jiaqi and Gao, Gao. Turbulent Decade: A History of the Cultural Revolution. (1996). 736 pp.

== Economy and environment ==
- Benn, James A. Tea in China: A Religious and Cultural History (2015)
- Chaffee, John W. The Muslim Merchants of Premodern China: The History of a Maritime Asian Trade Diaspora, 750–1400 (2018)
- Chao, Kang. Man and Land in Chinese History: An Economic Analysis (Stanford UP, 1986)
- Chow, Gregory C. China's Economic Transformation (2nd ed. 2007)
- Elvin, Mark. Retreat of the Elephants: An Environmental History of China. (2004). 564 pp.
- Elvin, Mark and Liu, Ts'ui-jung, eds. Sediments of Time: Environment and Society in Chinese History. (1998). 820 pp.
- von Glahn, Richard. The Economic History of China: From Antiquity to the Nineteenth Century (Cambridge UP, 2016). 461 pp. online review
- Ji, Zhaojin. A History of Modern Shanghai Banking: The Rise and Decline of China's Finance Capitalism. (2003). 325 pp.
- Naughton, Barry. The Chinese Economy: Transitions and Growth (2007)
- Rawski, Thomas G. and Lillian M. Li, eds. Chinese History in Economic Perspective, University of California Press, 1992 complete text online free
- Sheehan, Jackie. Chinese Workers: A New History. Routledge, 1998. 269 pp.
- Stuart-Fox, Martin. A Short History of China and Southeast Asia: Tribute, Trade and Influence. (2003). 278 pp.
- Von Glahn, Richard. The Economic History of China: "From Antiquity to the 19th Century (2016) excerpt

=== Atlases ===
- Stanford, Edward. Atlas of the Chinese Empire, containing separate maps of the eighteen provinces of China (2nd ed 1917) Legible color maps Online free

== Women and gender ==
- Ebrey, Patricia. The Inner Quarters: Marriage and the Lives of Chinese Women in the Sung Period (1990)
- Hershatter, Gail, and Wang Zheng. "Chinese History: A Useful Category of Gender Analysis," American Historical Review, Dec 2008, Vol. 113 Issue 5, pp 1404–1421
- Hershatter, Gail. Women in China's Long Twentieth Century (2007), full text online
- Hershatter, Gail, Emily Honig, Susan Mann, and Lisa Rofel, eds. Guide to Women's Studies in China (1998)
- Ko, Dorothy. Teachers of Inner Chambers: Women and Culture in China, 1573–1722 (1994)
- Mann, Susan. Precious Records: Women in China's Long Eighteenth Century (1997)
- Wang, Shuo. "The 'New Social History' in China: The Development of Women's History," History Teacher, May 2006, Vol. 39 Issue 3, pp 315–323
- Yan, Chen, and Karen Offen. "Women's History at the Cutting Edge: a joint paper in two voices." Women's History Review 27.1 (2018): 6-28.

== Bibliography ==
- Hayford, Charles. China: World Bibliographical Series (ABC-CLIO, 1997), annotates over 1500 works and refers to more than 2000 others, covering all fields and disciplines. Online at Internet Archive, HERE
- Elman, Benjamin, Classical Historiography For Chinese History, (November 2015) Princeton University. Extensive lists of sinological resources and bibliography.
- Wilkinson, Endymion, Chinese History: A New Manual Fifth Edition, Harvard University, Asia Center (for the Harvard-Yenching Institute), 2018, ISBN 978-0-9988883-0-9. Supersedes Wilkinson (2015). Though aimed at research specialists, contains summaries of major topics that will be useful for general readers.

== Historiography ==
- Clark, Hugh R. "What's the Matter with “China”? A Critique of Teleological History." Journal of Asian Studies 77.2 (2018): 295-314.
- Chen, Yan and Karen Offen. "Women's History at the Cutting Edge: a joint paper in two voices." Women's History Review 27.1 (2018): 6-28.
- Cohen, Paul A., Discovering History in China: American Historical Writing on the Recent Chinese Past (1984; New York: Columbia University Press; Studies of the East Asian Institute, 2010)
- Ding, Yizhuang. "Reflections on the 'New Qing History' School in the United States," Chinese Studies in History, Winter 2009/2010, Vol. 43 Issue 2, pp 92–96.
- Jin, Yan. "Shanghai Studies: An evolving academic field." History Compass 16.11 (2018): e12496.
- Li, Huaiyin. Reinventing Modern China: Imagination and Authenticity in Chinese Historical Writing (Honolulu, 2012)
- Mann, Susan. Gender and Sexuality in Modern Chinese History (New York: Cambridge University Press; New Approaches to Asian History, 2011)
- Mitter, Rana. "Research Note Changed by War: The Changing Historiography Of Wartime China and New Interpretations Of Modern Chinese History." The Chinese Historical Review 17.1 (2010): 85-95.
- Schneider, Julia C. Nation and Ethnicity: Chinese Discussions on History, Historiography, and Nationalism (1900s-1920s) (Brill, 2017) 501 pp.
- Smith, S. A. "China, Revolution and Presentism." Past & Present 234.1 (2017): 274-289.
- Szonyi, Michael. A Companion to Chinese History (Hoboken, NJ: John Wiley & Sons, 2016). Review-of-the-field articles on periods and topics.
- Taylor, Jeremy E., and Grace C. Huang. "'Deep changes in interpretive currents'? Chiang Kai-shek studies in the post-cold war era." International Journal of Asian Studies 9.1 (2012): 99-121.
- Unger, Jonathan. Using the Past to Serve the Present: Historiography and Politics in Contemporary China (1993)
- Wilkinson, Endymion Porter. Chinese History: A New Manual (Cambridge, MA: Harvard University Asia Center, 2018). Annotated chapters on all aspects of Chinese history and culture up to 1911, including "boxes" that focus on topics of particular interest.
- Wu, Huaiqi and Chi Zhen, eds. An Historical Sketch of Chinese Historiography (2018).
- Zhang, Xupeng. "In and out of the west: On the past, present, and future of chinese historical theory." History and Theory 54.4 (2015): 46-63.
- Zurndorfer, Harriet. "Oceans of history, seas of change: recent revisionist writing in western languages about China and East Asian maritime history during the period 1500–1630." International Journal of Asian Studies 13.1 (2016): 61-94.

== Scholarly journals ==
- Central Asian Survey
- China Quarterly
- Chinese Studies in History
- East Asian History
- Early Medieval China. Covers the period between the end of the Han and beginning of the Tang.
- Journal of Asian Studies.
- Journal of Modern Chinese History
- Late Imperial China
- Modern China: An International Journal of History and Social Science
- Sino-Japanese Studies
- T'oung Pao: International Journal of Chinese Studies
