= Pleco Software =

English-Chinese dictionary and flashcard app

- Pleco logo, the Chinese character for "fish - yú"
- Founded: New York, NY, United States (2000)
- Founder: Michael Love
- Area served: Worldwide
- Products: Apps
- Website: pleco.com

Pleco Software (/ˈpliːkoʊ/) provides an English and Chinese Dictionary application for iOS and Android devices. The Pleco Software company was founded in May 2000 by Michael Love when he was studying abroad in China. Having difficulty remembering characters, Love developed a very rudimentary handwriting based dictionary for personal use on a Palm IIIx, and then realized it could be a good business opportunity, pursuing further development of the application that is in use today.

== Features ==
Pleco allows different ways of input, including Pinyin input method, English words, handwriting recognition and optical character recognition. It has many sets of dictionaries (including the Oxford, Longman, FLTRP, and Ricci), audio recordings from two different native speakers, flashcards functionality, and a document reader that can look up words in a document. Pleco is a free application with in-app purchases, additional functions and large dictionaries (including English, French, German, Mandarin, Cantonese, classical Chinese, and a traditional Chinese medicine reference).

== History ==
Pleco was started by Mike Love in May 2000 when he was 18 years old. The application was first launched on the Palm Pilot in 2001. In 2013, Pleco 3.0 was released. In November 2017, Endymion Wilkinson's Chinese History: A New Manual was added.

== Reception ==
As of July 2021, Pleco Chinese Dictionary had 4.7 stars on the iOS App Store, based on 1,300 ratings, and 4.6 stars out of 5 on Google Play, based on over 40,000 ratings.

In a 2013 opinion article for the New York Times, the British chef Fuchsia Dunlop wrote, "Pleco has absolutely changed my life", and "it's completely brilliant for traveling." In 2018, New York Times columnist Lucas Peterson said he found Pleco to be a "useful translation app".

== See also ==
- List of flashcard software
- Chinese language
