= Uncertainty in the Empire of Routine =

2022 book about 18th-century China

- Front cover
- Author: Maura Dykstra
- Language: English
- Genre: History
- Publisher: Harvard University Asia Center Press
- Publication date: 16 August 2022
- Publication place: United States
- Media type: Print (Hardback)
- Pages: 300
- ISBN: 978-0-674-27095-4

Uncertainty in the Empire of Routine: The Administrative Revolution of the Eighteenth-Century Qing State is a book by Maura Dykstra, currently an Assistant Professor of History at Yale University, published in 2022. The work has been criticized by other historians for being methodologically unsound and engaging in widespread misrepresentation of sources.

== Synopsis ==
The book argues that across the eighteenth century, Qing China witnessed an exponential increase in the volume of administrative paperwork out of a desire to combat corruption and centralize governance. However, the Empire became a victim of its own success. The more the paperwork was produced as a result of this "administrative revolution", the more evidence of corruption and malfeasance could be located; by the late eighteenth century, the anxious Emperors were convinced that their decline had begun.

== Reception and controversy ==
The book has gained significant notoriety for the negative reviews it received, particularly "Was There an Administrative Revolution?" published in August 2023 by George Qiao, a historian specializing in late imperial China at Amherst College. Qiao found Dykstra's narrative "groundless, self-contradictory, and ultimately untrue". He accused her of having "consistently" misused and misinterpreted primary sources in the quest of a dramatic story; all in all, her book was rife with "factual blunders, a failure to engage existing scholarship, problematic choice of primary sources, and dubious citation practices."

Following Qiao's critique, multiple academics criticized Dykstra for misrepresenting and mistranslating key sources to advance its thesis. Bradly Reed, a historian specializing in bureaucratic records of Qing China at the University of Virginia, remarked her work to be laden with "methodological, conceptual, and evidentiary shortcomings", and noted that Dykstra's "grand theoretical constructs" ran divorced from "evidence, historical context, or conversation with previous scholarship." Zhou Lin — an acclaimed expert in late Qing China archives — found Dykstra's concept of the "information revolution" to be novel but oversimplifying of the historical reality; more importantly, her conclusions were unsubstantiated by the sources she cited. Of the thirteen sources cited from the Ba County Archives, three were read correctly but misinterpreted; eight were read incorrectly and also misinterpreted; while one was irrelevant to her argument. Macabe Keliher, a historian of early modern China at Southern Methodist University, raised similar issues.

=== Response ===
Dykstra rejects the criticism; she argues Qiao to have engaged in a bad faith "quibble-to-innuendo cycle”, wherein any small quibble over translation or fact is presented as a "inexcusable fumble that invalidates [her] entire book and its intellectual project".
