= Bibliography of China's reform and opening =

- Billboard of Deng Xiaoping at Lychee Park, Shenzhen
- Subject: Reform and opening up
- Scope: Books, journal articles, primary sources
- Period covered: 1976 – 1989
- Languages: English
- Related: Bibliography of Chinese history; Bibliography of the Cold War

Bibliography of China's reform and opening is a list of English-language books and scholarly articles on the history of the People's Republic of China from the death of Mao Zedong in 1976 to the eve of the 1989 Tiananmen Square protests. Works whose coverage extends beyond 1989 are included where they treat this period in substantial detail.

This bibliography contains academic-level English-language books (including translations) and journal articles, published mainly after World War II. (Note: Works published before World War II should be limited to areas where there are no significant post–World War II books on the subject, or where the work in question has significant historical merit.) Book entries may have references to reviews published in academic journals or major newspapers when these could be considered helpful. These reference reviews also function as a resource to find other works on this subject.

Works listed here are cited in the notes or bibliographies of scholarly sources. Each is published by an academic or major trade press, written by a recognized expert, or substantially reviewed in scholarly journals; borderline cases are omitted. A selection of primary sources is included. Many of the books below carry their own bibliographies; see Further reading section for longer ones, and External links section for historical sites and museums.

Citations follow APA style. (Note: Entries are in plain text APA 7 format without templates; templates are used only for reviews and notes.) Books have citations to academic journal or mainstream published reviews when available. For books only partly about the subject, relevant chapter or section titles are given where useful and available. Translators of the original-language edition are included when possible. In cases where a title or name has appeared with more than one English spelling, the most recent published form is used and a footnote documents any earlier title under which the work appeared.

== General surveys ==
- Baum, R. (1994). Burying Mao: Chinese politics in the age of Deng Xiaoping. Princeton University Press.
- Butterfield, F. (1982). China: Alive in the bitter sea. Times Books.
- Chang, D. W. (1988). China under Deng Xiaoping: Political and economic reform. Macmillan.
- Derbyshire, I. (1987). Politics in China: From Mao to Deng. Chambers.
- Dittmer, L. (1994). China under reform. Westview Press.
- Garside, R. (1981). Coming alive: China after Mao. McGraw-Hill.
- Gewirtz, J. (2022). Never turn back: China and the forbidden history of the 1980s. Harvard University Press.
- Hamrin, C. L. (1990). China and the challenge of the future: Changing political patterns. Westview Press.
- Harding, H. (1987). China's second revolution: Reform after Mao. Brookings Institution.
- Kau, M. Y. M., & Marsh, S. H. (Eds.). (1993). China in the era of Deng Xiaoping: A decade of reform. M. E. Sharpe.
- Lampton, D. M. (Ed.). (1987). Policy implementation in post-Mao China. University of California Press.
- Lieberthal, K., & Oksenberg, M. (1988). Policy making in China: Leaders, structures, and processes. Princeton University Press.
- Lieberthal, K. G., & Lampton, D. M. (Eds.). (1992). Bureaucracy, politics, and decision making in post-Mao China. University of California Press.
- MacFarquhar, R., & Fairbank, J. K. (Eds.). (1991). The Cambridge history of China: Vol. 15. The People's Republic, part 2: Revolutions within the Chinese revolution, 1966–1982. Cambridge University Press.
- MacFarquhar, R. (Ed.). (1997). The politics of China: The eras of Mao and Deng (2nd ed.). Cambridge University Press.
- Mackerras, C., Taneja, P., & Young, G. (1993). China since 1978: Reform, modernization and "socialism with Chinese characteristics". Longman Cheshire.
- Meisner, M. (1996). The Deng Xiaoping era: An inquiry into the fate of Chinese socialism, 1978–1994. Hill and Wang.
- Salisbury, H. E. (1992). The new emperors: China in the era of Mao and Deng. Little, Brown.
- Torigian, J. (2022). Prestige, manipulation, and coercion: Elite power struggles in the Soviet Union and China after Stalin and Mao. Yale University Press.

== Transition from Mao ==
- Bonavia, D. (1984). Verdict in Peking: The trial of the Gang of Four. Burnett Books.
- Brugger, B. (Ed.). (1980). China since the "Gang of Four". Croom Helm.
- Chi Hsin. (1977). The case of the Gang of Four: With first translation of Teng Hsiao-ping's "Three poisonous weeds". Cosmos Books.
- Domes, J. (1977). China after the Cultural Revolution: Politics between two party congresses. University of California Press.
- Fontana, D. G. (1982). Background to the fall of Hua Guofeng. Asian Survey, 22(3), 237–260. JSTOR 2644028
- Gardner, J. (1982). Chinese politics and the succession to Mao. Holmes & Meier.
- Gates, M. A., & Geelhoed, E. B. (1986). The dragon and the snake: An American account of the turmoil in China, 1976–1977. University of Pennsylvania Press.
- Goodstadt, L. (1979). China's Watergate: Political and economic conflicts, 1969–1977. Vikas.
- Hooper, B. (1979). Inside Peking: A personal report. Macdonald and Jane's.
- Hsü, I. C. Y. (1983). China without Mao: The search for a new order. Oxford University Press.
- Onate, A. D. (1978). Hua Kuo-feng and the arrest of the "Gang of Four". The China Quarterly, 75, 540–565. doi:10.1017/s0305741000042557
- Schoenhals, M. (1991). The 1978 truth criterion controversy. The China Quarterly, 126, 243–268. doi:10.1017/s0305741000005191
- Teiwes, F. C. (1984). Leadership, legitimacy, and conflict in China: From a charismatic Mao to the politics of succession. M. E. Sharpe.
- Teiwes, F. C., & Sun, W. (2007). The end of the Maoist era: Chinese politics during the twilight of the Cultural Revolution, 1972–1976. M. E. Sharpe.
- Wang, T. (1980). Chairman Hua: Leader of the Chinese Communists. C. Hurst.
- Wu, T.-W. (1983). Lin Biao and the Gang of Four. Southern Illinois University Press.

== Political ==
- Burns, J. P. (Ed.). (1989). The Chinese Communist Party's nomenklatura system: A documentary study of party control of leadership selection, 1979–1984. M. E. Sharpe.
- Chi, H. (1991). Politics of disillusionment: The Chinese Communist Party under Deng Xiaoping, 1978–1989. M. E. Sharpe.
- Dittmer, L. (1987). China's continuous revolution: The post-liberation epoch, 1949–1981. University of California Press.
- Fewsmith, J. (2001). Elite politics in contemporary China. M. E. Sharpe.
- Hamrin, C. L., & Zhao, S. (Eds.). (1995). Decision-making in Deng's China: Perspectives from insiders. M. E. Sharpe.
- Huang, J. (2000). Factionalism in Chinese Communist politics. Cambridge University Press.
- Lam, W. W.-L. (1995). China after Deng Xiaoping: The power struggle in Beijing since Tiananmen. Wiley.
- Lee, H. Y. (1991). From revolutionary cadres to party technocrats in socialist China. University of California Press.
- Lieberthal, K. (1978). Central documents and Politburo politics in China. Center for Chinese Studies, University of Michigan.
- Lü, X. (2000). Cadres and corruption: The organizational involution of the Chinese Communist Party. Stanford University Press.
- MacFarquhar, R., & Fairbank, J. K. (Eds.). (1991). The Cambridge history of China: Vol. 15. The People's Republic, part 2: Revolutions within the Chinese revolution, 1966–1982. Cambridge University Press.
- MacFarquhar, R. (Ed.). (1997). The politics of China: The eras of Mao and Deng (2nd ed.). Cambridge University Press.
- Manion, M. (1993). Retirement of revolutionaries in China: Public policies, social norms, private interests. Princeton University Press.
- Moody, P. R. (1983). Chinese politics after Mao: Development and liberalization, 1976 to 1983. Praeger.
- Schram, S. R. (Ed.). (1987). Foundations and limits of state power in China. School of Oriental and African Studies, University of London.
- Tien, H.-M. (1984). The Communist Party of China: Party powers and group politics from the Third Plenum to the Twelfth Party Congress. School of Law, University of Maryland.
- Tsou, T. (1986). The Cultural Revolution and post-Mao reforms: A historical perspective. University of Chicago Press.
- Uhalley, S. (1988). A history of the Chinese Communist Party. Hoover Institution Press.
- Unger, J. (Ed.). (2002). The nature of Chinese politics: From Mao to Jiang. M. E. Sharpe.

=== Ideology ===
- Brugger, B., & Kelly, D. (1990). Chinese Marxism in the post-Mao era. Stanford University Press.
- Brugger, B. (Ed.). (1985). Chinese Marxism in flux, 1978–84: Essays on epistemology, ideology, and political economy. M. E. Sharpe.
- Chen, F. (1995). Economic transition and political legitimacy in post-Mao China: Ideology and reform. State University of New York Press.
- Dirlik, A., & Meisner, M. (Eds.). (1989). Marxism and the Chinese experience: Issues in contemporary Chinese socialism. M. E. Sharpe.
- Joseph, W. A. (1984). The critique of ultra-leftism in China, 1958–1981. Stanford University Press.
- Ladany, L. (1992). The Communist Party of China and Marxism, 1921–1985: A self portrait. Hong Kong University Press.
- Michael, F., Linden, C., Prybyla, J., & Domes, J. (1990). China and the crisis of Marxism-Leninism. Westview Press.
- Misra, K. (1998). From post-Maoism to post-Marxism: The erosion of official ideology in Deng's China. Routledge.
- Schram, S. R. (1984). Ideology and policy in China since the Third Plenum, 1978–84. Contemporary China Institute, School of Oriental and African Studies, University of London.
- Shaw, Y. (Ed.). (1988). Changes and continuities in Chinese communism: Vol. 1. Ideology, politics, and foreign policy. Westview Press.
- Su, S. (1993). Marxism and reform in China. Spokesman.
- Sun, Y. (1995). The Chinese reassessment of socialism, 1976–1992. Princeton University Press.
- Zhang, W.-W. (1996). Ideology and economic reform under Deng Xiaoping, 1978–1993. Kegan Paul International.

=== Political reform ===
- Chi, W.-S. (1986). Ideological conflicts in modern China: Democracy and authoritarianism. Transaction Books.
- Ding, X. L. (1994). The decline of communism in China: Legitimacy crisis, 1977–1989. Cambridge University Press.
- Friedman, E. (1995). National identity and democratic prospects in socialist China. M. E. Sharpe.
- Goldman, M. (1991). Hu Yaobang's intellectual network and the Theory Conference of 1979. The China Quarterly, 126, 219–242. doi:10.1017/s030574100000518x
- Goldman, M. (1994). Sowing the seeds of democracy in China: Political reform in the Deng Xiaoping era. Harvard University Press.
- Goldman, M., Cheek, T., & Hamrin, C. L. (Eds.). (1987). China's intellectuals and the state: In search of a new relationship. Council on East Asian Studies, Harvard University.
- Hamrin, C. L., & Cheek, T. (Eds.). (1986). China's establishment intellectuals. M. E. Sharpe.
- Hu, S. (2000). Explaining Chinese democratization. Praeger.
- Hua, S. (1995). Scientism and humanism: Two cultures in post-Mao China, 1978–1989. State University of New York Press.
- McCormick, B. L. (1990). Political reform in post-Mao China: Democracy and bureaucracy in a Leninist state. University of California Press.
- Nathan, A. J. (1990). China's crisis: Dilemmas of reform and prospects for democracy. Columbia University Press.
- Schell, O. (1988). Discos and democracy: China in the throes of reform. Pantheon Books.

=== Dissent ===
- Cherrington, R. (1991). China's students: The struggle for democracy. Routledge.
- Edwards, R. R., Henkin, L., & Nathan, A. J. (1986). Human rights in contemporary China. Columbia University Press.
- Leijonhufvud, G. (1990). Going against the tide: On dissent and big-character posters in China. Curzon Press.
- Liu, B. (1990). China's crisis, China's hope (H. Goldblatt, Trans.). Harvard University Press.
- Moody, P. R. (1977). Opposition and dissent in contemporary China. Hoover Institution Press.
- Nathan, A. J. (1985). Chinese democracy. Knopf.
- Seymour, J. D. (Ed.). (1980). The fifth modernization: China's human rights movement, 1978–1979. Human Rights Publishing Group.

== Domestic policy ==
=== Economic reform ===
- Brødsgaard, K. E. (2009). Hainan: State, society, and business in a Chinese province. Routledge.
- Byrd, W. A. (1991). The market mechanism and economic reforms in China. M. E. Sharpe.
- Chung, J. H. (Ed.). (1999). Cities in China: Recipes for economic development in the reform era. Routledge.
- Coase, R., & Wang, N. (2012). How China became capitalist. Palgrave Macmillan.
- Crane, G. T. (1990). The political economy of China's special economic zones. M. E. Sharpe.
- Du, J. (2020). The Shenzhen experiment: The story of China's instant city. Harvard University Press.
- Fewsmith, J. (1994). Dilemmas of reform in China: Political conflict and economic debate. M. E. Sharpe.
- Gewirtz, J. (2017). Unlikely partners: Chinese reformers, Western economists, and the making of global China. Harvard University Press.
- Granick, D. (1990). Chinese state enterprises: A regional property rights analysis. University of Chicago Press.
- Ho, S. P. S., & Huenemann, R. W. (1984). China's open door policy: The quest for foreign technology and capital. University of British Columbia Press.
- Howell, J. (1993). China opens its doors: The politics of economic transition. Lynne Rienner.
- Hsu, R. C. (1991). Economic theories in China, 1979–1988. Cambridge University Press.
- Huang, Y. (1996). Inflation and investment controls in China: The political economy of central-local relations during the reform era. Cambridge University Press.
- Jao, Y. C., & Leung, C. K. (Eds.). (1986). China's special economic zones: Policies, problems, and prospects. Oxford University Press.
- Kleinberg, R. (1990). China's "opening" to the outside world: The experiment with foreign capitalism. Westview Press.
- Klenner, W., & Wiesegart, K. (1983). The Chinese economy: Structure and reform in the domestic economy and in foreign trade. Transaction Books.
- Kraus, W. (1991). Private business in China: Revival between ideology and pragmatism. Hurst.
- Lardy, N. R. (1992). Foreign trade and economic reform in China, 1978–1990. Cambridge University Press.
- Lee, K. (1991). Chinese firms and the state in transition: Property rights and agency problems in the reform era. M. E. Sharpe.
- Lee, P. N. S. (1987). Industrial management and economic reform in China, 1949–1984. Oxford University Press.
- Lin, J. Y., Cai, F., & Li, Z. (1996). The China miracle: Development strategy and economic reform. Chinese University Press.
- Lyons, T. P., & Nee, V. (Eds.). (1994). The economic transformation of South China: Reform and development in the post-Mao era. East Asia Program, Cornell University.
- Naughton, B. (1995). Growing out of the plan: Chinese economic reform, 1978–1993. Cambridge University Press.
- Oborne, M. (1986). China's special economic zones. OECD Development Centre.
- O'Donnell, M. A., Wong, W., & Bach, J. (Eds.). (2017). Learning from Shenzhen: China's post-Mao experiment from special zone to model city. University of Chicago Press.
- Park, J.-D. (1997). The special economic zones of China and their impact on its economic development. Praeger.
- Pearson, M. M. (1991). Joint ventures in the People's Republic of China: The control of foreign direct investment under socialism. Princeton University Press.
- Perry, E. J., & Wong, C. (Eds.). (1985). The political economy of reform in post-Mao China. Council on East Asian Studies, Harvard University.
- Reynolds, B. L. (Ed.). (1988). Chinese economic reform: How far, how fast? Academic Press.
- Shirk, S. L. (1993). The political logic of economic reform in China. University of California Press.
- Shirk, S. L. (1994). How China opened its door: The political success of the PRC's foreign trade and investment reforms. Brookings Institution Press.
- Solinger, D. J. (1991). From lathes to looms: China's industrial policy in comparative perspective, 1979–1982. Stanford University Press.
- Talas, B. (1991). Economic reform and political reform attempts in China, 1979–1989. Springer.
- Tidrick, G., & Chen, J. (Eds.). (1987). China's industrial reform. Oxford University Press.
- Totten, G., & Zhou, S. (Eds.). (1992). China's economic reform: Administering the introduction of the market mechanism. Westview Press.
- Vogel, E. F. (1989). One step ahead in China: Guangdong under reform. Harvard University Press.
- Weber, I. M. (2021). How China escaped shock therapy: The market reform debate. Routledge.
- White, G. (1993). Riding the tiger: The politics of economic reform in post-Mao China. Stanford University Press.
- Wong, C. P. W., Heady, C., & Woo, W. T. (1995). Fiscal management and economic reform in the People's Republic of China. Oxford University Press.
- Wong, K., & Chu, D. K. Y. (Eds.). (1985). Modernization in China: The case of the Shenzhen special economic zone. Oxford University Press.
- Yeung, Y., & Hu, X. (Eds.). (1992). China's coastal cities: Catalysts for modernization. University of Hawaii Press.
- Young, S. (1995). Private business and economic reform in China. M. E. Sharpe.

=== Rural reform ===
- Byrd, W. A., & Lin, Q. (Eds.). (1990). China's rural industry: Structure, development, and reform. Oxford University Press.
- Chan, A., Madsen, R., & Unger, J. (1992). Chen Village under Mao and Deng (Expanded and updated ed.). University of California Press.
- Delman, J., Østergaard, C. S., & Christiansen, F. (Eds.). (1990). Remaking peasant China: Problems of rural development and institutions at the start of the 1990s. Aarhus University Press.
- Endicott, S. (1988). Red earth: Revolution in a Sichuan village. I. B. Tauris.
- Findlay, C., Watson, A., & Wu, H. X. (Eds.). (1994). Rural enterprises in China. St. Martin's Press.
- Friedman, E., Pickowicz, P. G., & Selden, M. (2005). Revolution, resistance, and reform in village China. Yale University Press.
- Garnaut, R., Guo, S., & Ma, G. (Eds.). (1996). The third revolution in the Chinese countryside. Cambridge University Press.
- Huang, S.-M. (1989). The spiral road: Change in a Chinese village through the eyes of a Communist Party leader. Westview Press.
- Huang, Y. (1998). Agricultural reform in China: Getting institutions right. Cambridge University Press.
- Kelliher, D. (1992). Peasant power in China: The era of rural reform, 1979–1989. Yale University Press.
- Madsen, R. (1984). Morality and power in a Chinese village. University of California Press.
- Oi, J. C. (1999). Rural China takes off: Institutional foundations of economic reform. University of California Press.
- Perkins, D. H., & Yusuf, S. (1984). Rural development in China. Johns Hopkins University Press.
- Powell, S. (1992). Agricultural reform in China: From communes to commodity economy, 1978–1990. Manchester University Press.
- Putterman, L. (1993). Continuity and change in China's rural development: Collective and reform eras in perspective. Oxford University Press.
- Saith, A. (Ed.). (1987). The re-emergence of the Chinese peasantry: Aspects of rural decollectivisation. Croom Helm.
- Unger, J. (2002). The transformation of rural China. M. E. Sharpe.
- Walder, A. G. (Ed.). (1998). Zouping in transition: The process of reform in rural North China. Harvard University Press.
- Wang, X., & Bai, N. (1991). The poverty of plenty. Macmillan.
- Yang, D. L. (1996). Calamity and reform in China: State, rural society, and institutional change since the Great Leap Famine. Stanford University Press.
- Zhou, K. X. (1996). How the farmers changed China: Power of the people. Westview Press.
- Zhu, L. (1991). Rural reform and peasant income in China: The impact of China's post-Mao rural reforms in selected regions. St. Martin's Press.
- Zweig, D. (1997). Freeing China's farmers: Rural restructuring in the reform era. M. E. Sharpe.

=== Law ===
- Alford, W. P. (1995). To steal a book is an elegant offense: Intellectual property law in Chinese civilization. Stanford University Press.
- Brady, J. P. (1982). Justice and politics in people's China: Legal order or continuing revolution? Academic Press.
- Ho, V. H. (2005). Labor dispute resolution in China: Implications for labor rights and legal reform. Institute of East Asian Studies, University of California, Berkeley.
- Keith, R. C. (1994). China's struggle for the rule of law. Macmillan.
- Kent, A. (1993). Between freedom and subsistence: China and human rights. Oxford University Press.
- Leng, S.-C., & Chiu, H. (1985). Criminal justice in post-Mao China: Analysis and documents. State University of New York Press.
- Lo, C. W.-H. (1995). China's legal awakening: Legal theory and criminal justice in Deng's era. Hong Kong University Press.
- Lubman, S. B. (1999). Bird in a cage: Legal reform in China after Mao. Stanford University Press.
- Lubman, S. B. (Ed.). (1996). China's legal reforms. Oxford University Press.
- Otto, J. M., Polak, M. V., Chen, J., & Li, Y. (Eds.). (2000). Law-making in the People's Republic of China. Kluwer Law International.
- Peerenboom, R. (2002). China's long march toward rule of law. Cambridge University Press.
- Potter, P. B. (Ed.). (1994). Domestic law reforms in post-Mao China. M. E. Sharpe.
- Seymour, J. D., & Anderson, R. (1998). New ghosts, old ghosts: Prisons and labor reform camps in China. M. E. Sharpe.
- Tanner, H. M. (1999). Strike hard! Anti-crime campaigns and Chinese criminal justice, 1979–1985. East Asia Program, Cornell University.
- Tanner, M. S. (1999). The politics of lawmaking in post-Mao China: Institutions, processes, and democratic prospects. Clarendon Press.
- Turner, K. G., Feinerman, J. V., & Guy, R. K. (Eds.). (2000). The limits of the rule of law in China. University of Washington Press.

=== Population policy ===
- Aird, J. S. (1990). Slaughter of the innocents: Coercive birth control in China. AEI Press.
- Banister, J. (1987). China's changing population. Stanford University Press.
- Chen, P.-C. (1981). Rural health and birth planning in China. International Fertility Research Program.
- Croll, E., Davin, D., & Kane, P. (Eds.). (1985). China's one-child family policy. Macmillan.
- Dikötter, F. (1998). Imperfect conceptions: Medical knowledge, birth defects, and eugenics in China. Hurst.
- Fong, M. (2016). One child: The story of China's most radical experiment. Houghton Mifflin Harcourt.
- Fong, V. L. (2004). Only hope: Coming of age under China's one-child policy. Stanford University Press.
- Greenhalgh, S. (2008). Just one child: Science and policy in Deng's China. University of California Press.
- Greenhalgh, S., & Winckler, E. A. (2005). Governing China's population: From Leninist to neoliberal biopolitics. Stanford University Press.
- Johnson, K. A. (2016). China's hidden children: Abandonment, adoption, and the human costs of the one-child policy. University of Chicago Press.
- Kane, P. (1987). The second billion: Population and family planning in China. Penguin Books.
- Lee, J. Z., & Wang, F. (1999). One quarter of humanity: Malthusian mythology and Chinese realities, 1700–2000. Harvard University Press.
- Mellors Rodriguez, S. (2023). Reproductive realities in modern China: Birth control and abortion, 1911–2021. Cambridge University Press.
- Nie, J.-B. (2005). Behind the silence: Chinese voices on abortion. Rowman & Littlefield.
- Peng, X. (1991). Demographic transition in China: Fertility trends since the 1950s. Clarendon Press.
- Scharping, T. (2003). Birth control in China 1949–2000: Population policy and demographic development. RoutledgeCurzon.
- Wang, G. T. (1999). China's population: Problems, thoughts and policies. Ashgate.
- White, T. (2006). China's longest campaign: Birth planning in the People's Republic, 1949–2005. Cornell University Press.

=== Environment ===
- Economy, E. C. (2004). The river runs black: The environmental challenge to China's future. Cornell University Press.
- Edmonds, R. L. (1994). Patterns of China's lost harmony: A survey of the country's environmental degradation and protection. Routledge.
- Edmonds, R. L. (Ed.). (1998). Managing the Chinese environment. Oxford University Press.
- Elvin, M. (2004). The retreat of the elephants: An environmental history of China. Yale University Press.
- He, B. (1992). China on the edge: The crisis of ecology and development. China Books & Periodicals.
- Ma, X., & Ortolano, L. (2000). Environmental regulation in China: Institutions, enforcement, and compliance. Rowman & Littlefield.
- McElroy, M. B., Nielsen, C. P., & Lydon, P. (Eds.). (1998). Energizing China: Reconciling environmental protection and economic growth. Harvard University Committee on Environment.
- Qu, G., & Lee, W. (Eds.). (1984). Managing the environment in China. Tycooly International.
- Qu, G., & Li, J. (1994). Population and the environment in China. Lynne Rienner.
- Ross, L. (1988). Environmental policy in China. Indiana University Press.
- Ross, L., & Silk, M. A. (1987). Environmental law and policy in the People's Republic of China. Quorum Books.
- Shapiro, J. (2001). Mao's war against nature: Politics and the environment in revolutionary China. Cambridge University Press.
- Sinkule, B. J., & Ortolano, L. (1995). Implementing environmental policy in China. Praeger.
- Smil, V. (1984). The bad earth: Environmental degradation in China. M. E. Sharpe.
- Smil, V. (1988). Energy in China's modernization: Advances and limitations. M. E. Sharpe.
- Smil, V. (1993). China's environmental crisis: An inquiry into the limits of national development. M. E. Sharpe.
- Smil, V. (2004). China's past, China's future: Energy, food, environment. RoutledgeCurzon.

=== Health and medicine ===
- Anson, O., & Sun, S. (2005). Health care in rural China: Lessons from HeBei Province. Ashgate.
- Chen, C. C. (1989). Medicine in rural China: A personal account. University of California Press.
- Cooper, J. E., & Sartorius, N. (Eds.). (1996). Mental disorders in China. Gaskell.
- Farquhar, J. (1994). Knowing practice: The clinical encounter of Chinese medicine. Westview Press.
- Henderson, G. E., & Cohen, M. S. (1984). The Chinese hospital: A socialist work unit. Yale University Press.
- Hillier, S. M., & Jewell, J. A. (1983). Health care and traditional medicine in China, 1800–1982. Routledge & Kegan Paul.
- Hsu, E. (1999). The transmission of Chinese medicine. Cambridge University Press.
- Kleinman, A. (1986). Social origins of distress and disease: Depression, neurasthenia, and pain in modern China. Yale University Press.
- Lin, T.-Y., & Eisenberg, L. (Eds.). (1985). Mental health planning for one billion people: A Chinese perspective. University of British Columbia Press.
- Lucas, A. (1982). Chinese medical modernization: Comparative policy continuities, 1930s–1980s. Praeger.
- Minden, K. (1994). Bamboo stone: The evolution of a Chinese medical elite. University of Toronto Press.
- Pearson, V. (1995). Mental health care in China: State policies, professional services and family responsibilities. Gaskell.
- Rosenthal, M. M. (1987). Health care in the People's Republic of China: Moving toward modernization. Westview Press.
- Scheid, V. (2002). Chinese medicine in contemporary China: Plurality and synthesis. Duke University Press.
- Sidel, R., & Sidel, V. W. (1982). The health of China. Beacon Press.
- Sivin, N. (1987). Traditional medicine in contemporary China. Center for Chinese Studies, University of Michigan.
- World Bank. (1984). China: The health sector. World Bank.

== Society ==
- Bian, Y. (1994). Work and inequality in urban China. State University of New York Press.
- Brook, T., & Frolic, B. M. (Eds.). (1997). Civil society in China. M. E. Sharpe.
- Davin, D. (1999). Internal migration in contemporary China. Macmillan.
- Davis, D., & Vogel, E. F. (Eds.). (1990). Chinese society on the eve of Tiananmen: The impact of reform. Harvard University Press.
- Davis, D., & Harrell, S. (Eds.). (1993). Chinese families in the post-Mao era. University of California Press.
- Davis, D. S., Kraus, R., Naughton, B., & Perry, E. J. (Eds.). (1995). Urban spaces in contemporary China: The potential for autonomy and community in post-Mao China. Cambridge University Press.
- Davis-Friedmann, D. (1983). Long lives: Chinese elderly and the Communist revolution. Harvard University Press.
- Ikels, C. (1996). The return of the god of wealth: The transition to a market economy in urban China. Stanford University Press.
- Jankowiak, W. R. (1993). Sex, death, and hierarchy in a Chinese city: An anthropological account. Columbia University Press.
- Jiang, Y., & Ashley, D. (2000). Mao's children in the new China: Voices from the Red Guard generation. Routledge.
- Perry, E. J., & Selden, M. (Eds.). (2000). Chinese society: Change, conflict and resistance. Routledge.
- Potter, S. H., & Potter, J. M. (1990). China's peasants: The anthropology of a revolution. Cambridge University Press.
- Rosenbaum, A. L. (Ed.). (1992). State and society in China: The consequences of reform. Westview Press.
- Solinger, D. J. (1999). Contesting citizenship in urban China: Peasant migrants, the state, and the logic of the market. University of California Press.
- Tang, W., & Parish, W. L. (2000). Chinese urban life under reform: The changing social contract. Cambridge University Press.
- Walder, A. G. (1986). Communist neo-traditionalism: Work and authority in Chinese industry. University of California Press.
- Yan, Y. (1996). The flow of gifts: Reciprocity and social networks in a Chinese village. Stanford University Press.
- Yang, M. M. (1994). Gifts, favors, and banquets: The art of social relationships in China. Cornell University Press.

=== Education ===
- Agelasto, M., & Adamson, B. (Eds.). (1998). Higher education in post-Mao China. Hong Kong University Press.
- Cleverley, J. (1985). The schooling of China: Tradition and modernity in Chinese education. Allen & Unwin.
- Deng, P. (1997). Private education in modern China. Praeger.
- Epstein, I. (Ed.). (1991). Chinese education: Problems, policies, and prospects. Garland.
- Hayhoe, R. (1989). China's universities and the open door. M. E. Sharpe.
- Hayhoe, R. (1996). China's universities, 1895–1995: A century of cultural conflict. Garland.
- Hayhoe, R., & Bastid, M. (Eds.). (1987). China's education and the industrialized world: Studies in cultural transfer. M. E. Sharpe.
- Lampton, D. M., Madancy, J. A., & Williams, K. M. (1986). A relationship restored: Trends in U.S.–China educational exchanges, 1978–1984. National Academy Press.
- Lin, J. (1992). Education in post-Mao China. Praeger.
- Lin, J. (1999). Social transformation and private education in China. Praeger.
- Montaperto, R. N., & Henderson, J. (Eds.). (1979). China's schools in flux. Macmillan.
- Orleans, L. A. (1988). Chinese students in America: Policies, issues, and numbers. National Academy Press.
- Pepper, S. (1984). China's universities: Post-Mao enrollment policies and their impact on the structure of secondary education. Center for Chinese Studies, University of Michigan.
- Pepper, S. (1990). China's education reform in the 1980s: Policies, issues, and historical perspectives. Institute of East Asian Studies, University of California, Berkeley.
- Pepper, S. (1996). Radicalism and education reform in 20th-century China: The search for an ideal development model. Cambridge University Press.
- Peterson, G., Hayhoe, R., & Lu, Y. (Eds.). (2001). Education, culture, and identity in twentieth-century China. University of Michigan Press.
- Thøgersen, S. (1990). Secondary education in China after Mao: Reform and social conflict. Aarhus University Press.
- Zweig, D., & Chen, C. (1995). China's brain drain to the United States: Views of overseas Chinese students and scholars in the 1990s. Institute of East Asian Studies, University of California, Berkeley.

=== Labor and workers ===
- Child, J. (1994). Management in China during the age of reform. Cambridge University Press.
- Korzec, M. (1992). Labour and the failure of reform in China. Macmillan.
- Lee, L. T. (1986). Trade unions in China, 1949 to the present: The organization and leadership of the All-China Federation of Trade Unions. Singapore University Press.
- Leung, W.-Y. (1988). Smashing the iron rice pot: Workers and unions in China's market socialism. Asia Monitor Resource Center.
- Lü, X., & Perry, E. J. (Eds.). (1997). Danwei: The changing Chinese workplace in historical and comparative perspective. M. E. Sharpe.
- Ng, S. H., & Warner, M. (1998). China's trade unions and management. St. Martin's Press.
- O'Leary, G. (Ed.). (1997). Adjusting to capitalism: Chinese workers and the state. M. E. Sharpe.
- Sargeson, S. (1999). Reworking China's proletariat. Macmillan.
- Sheehan, J. (1998). Chinese workers: A new history. Routledge.
- Wang, F.-L. (1998). From family to market: Labor allocation in contemporary China. Rowman & Littlefield.
- Warner, M. (1995). The management of human resources in Chinese industry. St. Martin's Press.
- Warner, M. (Ed.). (1987). Management reforms in China. St. Martin's Press.

=== Women and gender ===
- Andors, P. (1983). The unfinished liberation of Chinese women, 1949–1980. Indiana University Press.
- Croll, E. (1983). Chinese women since Mao. Zed Books.
- Croll, E. (1995). Changing identities of Chinese women: Rhetoric, experience, and self-perception in twentieth-century China. Hong Kong University Press.
- Entwisle, B., & Henderson, G. E. (Eds.). (2000). Re-drawing boundaries: Work, households, and gender in China. University of California Press.
- Evans, H. (1997). Women and sexuality in China: Dominant discourses of female sexuality and gender since 1949. Polity Press.
- Gaetano, A. M., & Jacka, T. (Eds.). (2004). On the move: Women and rural-to-urban migration in contemporary China. Columbia University Press.
- Gilmartin, C. K., Hershatter, G., Rofel, L., & White, T. (Eds.). (1994). Engendering China: Women, culture, and the state. Harvard University Press.
- Hemmel, V., & Sindbjerg, P. (1984). Women in rural China: Policy towards women before and after the Cultural Revolution. Curzon Press.
- Honig, E., & Hershatter, G. (1988). Personal voices: Chinese women in the 1980's. Stanford University Press.
- Jacka, T. (1997). Women's work in rural China: Change and continuity in an era of reform. Cambridge University Press.
- Johnson, K. A. (1983). Women, the family, and peasant revolution in China. University of Chicago Press.
- Judd, E. R. (1994). Gender and power in rural North China. Stanford University Press.
- Lee, C. K. (1998). Gender and the South China miracle: Two worlds of factory women. University of California Press.
- Rai, S., Pilkington, H., & Phizacklea, A. (Eds.). (1992). Women in the face of change: The Soviet Union, Eastern Europe, and China. Routledge.
- Rofel, L. (1999). Other modernities: Gendered yearnings in China after socialism. University of California Press.
- Stacey, J. (1983). Patriarchy and socialist revolution in China. University of California Press.
- Wolf, M. (1985). Revolution postponed: Women in contemporary China. Stanford University Press.

=== LGBTIQ+ ===
- Bao, H. (2018). Queer comrades: Gay identity and tongzhi activism in postsocialist China. Nordic Institute of Asian Studies.
- Chou, W.-S. (2000). Tongzhi: Politics of same-sex eroticism in Chinese societies. Haworth Press.
- Engebretsen, E. L. (2013). Queer women in urban China: An ethnography. Routledge.
- Ho, L. W. W. (2009). Gay and lesbian subculture in urban China. Routledge.
- Kong, T. S. K. (2010). Chinese male homosexualities: Memba, tongzhi and golden boy. Routledge.
- Rofel, L. (2007). Desiring China: Experiments in neoliberalism, sexuality, and public culture. Duke University Press.
- Ruan, F. (1991). Sex in China: Studies in sexology in Chinese culture. Plenum Press.
- Ruan, F., & Tsai, Y.-M. (1988). Male homosexuality in contemporary mainland China. Archives of Sexual Behavior, 17(2), 189–199. doi:10.1007/bf01542668
- Ruan, F., Bullough, V. L., & Tsai, Y.-M. (1989). Male transsexualism in mainland China. Archives of Sexual Behavior, 18(6), 517–522. doi:10.1007/bf01541677
- Sang, T.-L. D. (2003). The emerging lesbian: Female same-sex desire in modern China. University of Chicago Press.

=== Religion ===
- Ashiwa, Y., & Wank, D. L. (Eds.). (2009). Making religion, making the state: The politics of religion in modern China. Stanford University Press.
- Chau, A. Y. (2006). Miraculous response: Doing popular religion in contemporary China. Stanford University Press.
- Ching, J. (1990). Probing China's soul: Religion, politics, and protest in the People's Republic. Harper & Row.
- Dean, K. (1993). Taoist ritual and popular cults of Southeast China. Princeton University Press.
- Feuchtwang, S. (1992). The imperial metaphor: Popular religion in China. Routledge.
- Gillette, M. B. (2000). Between Mecca and Beijing: Modernization and consumption among urban Chinese Muslims. Stanford University Press.
- Goossaert, V., & Palmer, D. A. (2011). The religious question in modern China. University of Chicago Press.
- Hunter, A., & Chan, K.-K. (1993). Protestantism in contemporary China. Cambridge University Press.
- Luo, Z. (Ed.). (1991). Religion under socialism in China. M. E. Sharpe.
- MacInnis, D. E. (1989). Religion in China today: Policy and practice. Orbis Books.
- Madsen, R. (1998). China's Catholics: Tragedy and hope in an emerging civil society. University of California Press.
- Overmyer, D. L. (Ed.). (2003). Religion in China today. Cambridge University Press.
- Palmer, D. A. (2007). Qigong fever: Body, science, and utopia in China. Columbia University Press.
- Pas, J. F. (Ed.). (1989). The turning of the tide: Religion in China today. Oxford University Press.
- Uhalley, S., & Wu, X. (Eds.). (2001). China and Christianity: Burdened past, hopeful future. M. E. Sharpe.
- Whyte, B. (1988). Unfinished encounter: China and Christianity. Fount Paperbacks.

== Culture ==
- Chang, A. (1980). Painting in the People's Republic of China: The politics of style. Westview Press.
- Chen, X. (1995). Occidentalism: A theory of counter-discourse in post-Mao China. Oxford University Press.
- Clark, P. (2005). Reinventing China: A generation and its films. Chinese University Press.
- Duke, M. S. (1985). Blooming and contending: Chinese literature in the post-Mao era. Indiana University Press.
- Gao, M. (2011). Total modernity and the avant-garde in twentieth-century Chinese art. MIT Press.
- Goldman, M. (1981). China's intellectuals: Advise and dissent. Harvard University Press.
- Hsu, K.-Y., & Wang, T. (Eds.). (1980). Literature of the People's Republic of China. Indiana University Press.
- Jones, A. F. (1992). Like a knife: Ideology and genre in contemporary Chinese popular music. East Asia Program, Cornell University.
- Kinkley, J. C. (2000). Chinese justice, the fiction: Law and literature in modern China. Stanford University Press.
- Kinkley, J. C. (Ed.). (1985). After Mao: Chinese literature and society, 1978–1981. Council on East Asian Studies, Harvard University.
- Kraus, R. C. (1989). Pianos and politics in China: Middle-class ambitions and the struggle over Western music. Oxford University Press.
- Link, P. (1992). Evening chats in Beijing: Probing China's predicament. Norton.
- Link, P. (2000). The uses of literature: Life in the socialist Chinese literary system. Princeton University Press.
- Link, P. (Ed.). (1983). Stubborn weeds: Popular and controversial Chinese literature after the Cultural Revolution. Indiana University Press.
- Louie, K. (1989). Between fact and fiction: Essays on post-Mao Chinese literature and society. Wild Peony.
- Mok, K.-H. (1998). Intellectuals and the state in post-Mao China. Macmillan.
- Su, X., & Wang, L. (1991). Deathsong of the river: A reader's guide to the Chinese TV series Heshang (R. W. Bodman & P. P. Wan, Trans.). East Asia Program, Cornell University.
- van Crevel, M. (1996). Language shattered: Contemporary Chinese poetry and Duoduo. Research School CNWS.
- Wang, J. (1996). High culture fever: Politics, aesthetics, and ideology in Deng's China. University of California Press.
- Zhang, X. (1997). Chinese modernism in the era of reforms: Cultural fever, avant-garde fiction, and the new Chinese cinema. Duke University Press.
- Zhang, X. (Ed.). (2001). Whither China? Intellectual politics in contemporary China. Duke University Press.
- Zhu, Y. (2003). Chinese cinema during the era of reform: The ingenuity of the system. Praeger.

== Media ==
- Bishop, R. L. (1989). Qi lai! Mobilizing one billion Chinese: The Chinese communication system. Iowa State University Press.
- Chang, W. H. (1989). Mass media in China: The history and the future. Iowa State University Press.
- Chu, G. C. (Ed.). (1978). Popular media in China: Shaping new cultural patterns. University Press of Hawaii.
- Fu, H. L., & Cullen, R. (1996). Media law in the PRC. Asia Law & Practice.
- Hong, J. (1998). The internationalization of television in China: The evolution of ideology, society, and media since the reform. Praeger.
- Howkins, J. (1982). Mass communication in China. Longman.
- Lee, C.-C. (Ed.). (1990). Voices of China: The interplay of politics and journalism. Guilford Press.
- Lee, C.-C. (Ed.). (1994). China's media, media's China. Westview Press.
- Lee, C.-C. (Ed.). (2000). Power, money, and media: Communication patterns and bureaucratic control in cultural China. Northwestern University Press.
- Lull, J. (1991). China turned on: Television, reform, and resistance. Routledge.
- Lynch, D. C. (1999). After the propaganda state: Media, politics, and "thought work" in reformed China. Stanford University Press.
- Porter, R. (Ed.). (1992). Reporting the news from China. Royal Institute of International Affairs.
- Semsel, G. S. (Ed.). (1987). Chinese film: The state of the art in the People's Republic. Praeger.
- Zhao, Y. (1998). Media, market, and democracy in China: Between the party line and the bottom line. University of Illinois Press.

== Science and technology ==
- Baum, R. (Ed.). (1980). China's four modernizations: The new technological revolution. Westview Press.
- Cao, C. (2004). China's scientific elite. RoutledgeCurzon.
- Conroy, R. (1992). Technological change in China. OECD Development Centre.
- Feigenbaum, E. A. (2003). China's techno-warriors: National security and strategic competition from the nuclear to the information age. Stanford University Press.
- Feinstein, C. H., & Howe, C. (Eds.). (1997). Chinese technology transfer in the 1990s: Current experience, historical problems, and international perspectives. Edward Elgar.
- Gelber, H. G. (1979). Technology, defense, and external relations in China, 1975–1978. Westview Press.
- Gu, S. (1999). China's industrial technology: Market reform and organisational change. Routledge.
- Lu, Q. (2000). China's leap into the information age: Innovation and organization in the computer industry. Oxford University Press.
- Miller, H. L. (1996). Science and dissent in post-Mao China: The politics of knowledge. University of Washington Press.
- Orleans, L. A. (Ed.). (1980). Science in contemporary China. Stanford University Press.
- Saich, T. (1989). China's science policy in the 80s. Manchester University Press.
- Simon, D. F., & Rehn, D. (1988). Technological innovation in China: The case of Shanghai's electronics industry. Ballinger.
- Simon, D. F., & Goldman, M. (Eds.). (1989). Science and technology in post-Mao China. Harvard University Press.
- Suttmeier, R. P. (1980). Science, technology, and China's drive for modernization. Hoover Institution Press.
- Wang, Y.-F. (1993). China's science and technology policy: 1949–1989. Avebury.

== Nationalities ==
- Barnett, A. D. (1993). China's far west: Four decades of change. Westview Press.
- Benson, L., & Svanberg, I. (1998). China's last nomads: The history and culture of China's Kazaks. M. E. Sharpe.
- Bulag, U. E. (1998). Nationalism and hybridity in Mongolia. Clarendon Press.
- Gladney, D. C. (1991). Muslim Chinese: Ethnic nationalism in the People's Republic. Council on East Asian Studies, Harvard University.
- Harrell, S. (Ed.). (1995). Cultural encounters on China's ethnic frontiers. University of Washington Press.
- Heberer, T. (1989). China and its national minorities: Autonomy or assimilation? M. E. Sharpe.
- Mackerras, C. (1994). China's minorities: Integration and modernization in the twentieth century. Oxford University Press.
- Rossabi, M. (Ed.). (2004). Governing China's multiethnic frontiers. University of Washington Press.
- Rudelson, J. J. (1997). Oasis identities: Uyghur nationalism along China's Silk Road. Columbia University Press.

=== Tibet ===
- Barnett, R., & Akiner, S. (Eds.). (1994). Resistance and reform in Tibet. Indiana University Press.
- Goldstein, M. C. (1997). The snow lion and the dragon: China, Tibet, and the Dalai Lama. University of California Press.
- Goldstein, M. C., Siebenschuh, W. R., & Tsering, T. (1997). The struggle for modern Tibet: The autobiography of Tashi Tsering. M. E. Sharpe.
- Goldstein, M. C., & Kapstein, M. T. (Eds.). (1998). Buddhism in contemporary Tibet: Religious revival and cultural identity. University of California Press.
- Goldstein, M. C., Sherap, D., & Siebenschuh, W. R. (2004). A Tibetan revolutionary: The political life and times of Bapa Phüntso Wangye. University of California Press.
- Grunfeld, A. T. (1987). The making of modern Tibet. Zed Books.
- Gyatso, T. (1990). Freedom in exile: The autobiography of the Dalai Lama. HarperCollins.
- Norbu, D. (2001). China's Tibet policy. Curzon Press.
- Schwartz, R. D. (1994). Circle of protest: Political ritual in the Tibetan uprising, 1987–92. Columbia University Press.
- Shakya, T. (1999). The dragon in the land of snows: A history of modern Tibet since 1947. Pimlico.
- van Walt van Praag, M. C. (1987). The status of Tibet: History, rights, and prospects in international law. Wisdom Publications.

== Military ==
- Bullard, M. R. (1985). China's political-military evolution: The party and the military in the PRC, 1960–1984. Westview Press.
- Cheng, H.-S. (1990). Party-military relations in the PRC and Taiwan: Paradoxes of control. Westview Press.
- Cheung, T. M. (2001). China's entrepreneurial army. Oxford University Press.
- Cheung, T. M. (2009). Fortifying China: The struggle to build a modern defense economy. Cornell University Press.
- Folta, P. H. (1992). From swords to plowshares? Defense industry reform in the PRC. Westview Press.
- Godwin, P. H. B. (Ed.). (1983). The Chinese defense establishment: Continuity and change in the 1980s. Westview Press.
- Jencks, H. W. (1982). From muskets to missiles: Politics and professionalism in the Chinese army, 1945–1981. Westview Press.
- Joffe, E. (1987). The Chinese army after Mao. Harvard University Press.
- Lee, N. (1989). China's defence modernisation and military leadership. Australian National University Press.
- Lewis, J. W., & Xue, L. (1994). China's strategic seapower: The politics of force modernization in the nuclear age. Stanford University Press.
- Li, X. (2007). A history of the modern Chinese army. University Press of Kentucky.
- Nelsen, H. W. (1977). The Chinese military system: An organizational study of the Chinese People's Liberation Army. Westview Press.
- Segal, G. (1985). Defending China. Oxford University Press.
- Segal, G., & Tow, W. T. (Eds.). (1984). Chinese defence policy. Macmillan.
- Swaine, M. D. (1992). The military and political succession in China: Leadership, institutions, beliefs. RAND Corporation.
- Wortzel, L. M. (Ed.). (1988). China's military modernization: International implications. Greenwood Press.
- Young, J. R. (1987). The dragon's teeth: Inside China's armed forces. Hutchinson.

== Foreign policy ==
=== United States ===
- Foot, R. (1995). The practice of power: U.S. relations with China since 1949. Clarendon Press.
- Harding, H. (1992). A fragile relationship: The United States and China since 1972. Brookings Institution.
- Holdridge, J. H. (1997). Crossing the divide: An insider's account of the normalization of U.S.–China relations. Rowman & Littlefield.
- Mann, J. (1999). About face: A history of America's curious relationship with China, from Nixon to Clinton. Knopf.
- Ross, R. S. (1995). Negotiating cooperation: The United States and China, 1969–1989. Stanford University Press.
- Schaller, M. (1979). The United States and China in the twentieth century. Oxford University Press.
- Shambaugh, D. (1991). Beautiful imperialist: China perceives America, 1972–1990. Princeton University Press.
- Sutter, R. G. (1983). The China quandary: Domestic determinants of U.S. China policy, 1972–1982. Westview Press.
- Tan, Q. (1992). The making of U.S. China policy: From normalization to the post-Cold War era. Lynne Rienner.
- Tucker, N. B. (2001). China confidential: American diplomats and Sino-American relations, 1945–1996. Columbia University Press.
- Tyler, P. (1999). A great wall: Six presidents and China: An investigative history. PublicAffairs.

=== Soviet Union ===
- Ashley, R. K. (1980). The political economy of war and peace: The Sino-Soviet-American triangle and the modern security problematique. Frances Pinter.
- Dittmer, L. (1992). Sino-Soviet normalization and its international implications, 1945–1990. University of Washington Press.
- Ellison, H. J. (Ed.). (1982). The Sino-Soviet conflict: A global perspective. University of Washington Press.
- Gelman, H. (1982). The Soviet Far East buildup and Soviet risk-taking against China. RAND Corporation.
- Hart, T. G. (1987). Sino-Soviet relations: Re-examining the prospects for normalization. Gower.
- Jacobsen, C. G. (1981). Sino-Soviet relations since Mao: The chairman's legacy. Praeger.
- Low, A. D. (1987). The Sino-Soviet confrontation since Mao Zedong: Dispute, detente or conflict? Social Science Monographs.
- Medvedev, R. (1986). China and the superpowers. Blackwell.
- Middleton, D. (1978). The duel of the giants: China and Russia in Asia. Scribner.
- Radchenko, S. (2014). Unwanted visionaries: The Soviet failure in Asia at the end of the Cold War. Oxford University Press.
- Rozman, G. (1985). A mirror for socialism: Soviet criticisms of China. Princeton University Press.
- Rozman, G. (1987). The Chinese debate about Soviet socialism, 1978–1985. Princeton University Press.
- Segal, G. (1985). Sino-Soviet relations after Mao. International Institute for Strategic Studies.
- Stuart, D. T., & Tow, W. T. (Eds.). (1982). China, the Soviet Union, and the West: Strategic and political dimensions in the 1980s. Westview Press.
- Wishnick, E. (2001). Mending fences: The evolution of Moscow's China policy from Brezhnev to Yeltsin. University of Washington Press.

=== Japan ===
- He, Y. (2009). The search for reconciliation: Sino-Japanese and German-Polish relations since World War II. Cambridge University Press.
- Howe, C. (Ed.). (1996). China and Japan: History, trends, and prospects. Clarendon Press.
- Iriye, A. (1992). China and Japan in the global setting. Harvard University Press.
- Lee, C.-J. (1984). China and Japan: New economic diplomacy. Hoover Institution Press.
- Newby, L. (1988). Sino-Japanese relations: China's perspective. Routledge.
- Radtke, K. W. (1990). China's relations with Japan, 1945–83: The role of Liao Chengzhi. Manchester University Press.
- Rose, C. (1998). Interpreting history in Sino-Japanese relations: A case study in political decision-making. Routledge.
- Takamine, T. (2006). Japan's development aid to China: The long-running foreign policy of engagement. Routledge.
- Taylor, R. (1985). The Sino-Japanese axis: A new force in Asia? Athlone Press.
- Taylor, R. (1996). Greater China and Japan: Prospects for an economic partnership in East Asia. Routledge.
- Vogel, E. F. (2019). China and Japan: Facing history. Belknap Press of Harvard University Press.
- Wan, M. (2006). Sino-Japanese relations: Interaction, logic, and transformation. Woodrow Wilson Center Press.
- Whiting, A. S. (1989). China eyes Japan. University of California Press.
- Zhao, Q. (1993). Japanese policymaking: The politics behind politics: Informal mechanisms and the making of China policy. Praeger.

=== Vietnam ===
- Burchett, W. (1981). The China–Cambodia–Vietnam triangle. Zed Press.
- Chanda, N. (1986). Brother enemy: The war after the war. Harcourt Brace Jovanovich.
- Chandler, D. P., & Kiernan, B. (Eds.). (1983). Revolution and its aftermath in Kampuchea: Eight essays. Yale University Southeast Asia Studies.
- Chang, P.-M. (1982). Beijing, Hanoi, and the overseas Chinese. Institute of East Asian Studies, University of California, Berkeley.
- Chang, P.-M. (1985). Kampuchea between China and Vietnam. Singapore University Press.
- Chen, K. C. (1987). China's war with Vietnam, 1979: Issues, decisions, and implications. Hoover Institution Press.
- Duiker, W. J. (1986). China and Vietnam: The roots of conflict. Institute of East Asian Studies, University of California, Berkeley.
- Hood, S. J. (1992). Dragons entangled: Indochina and the China–Vietnam war. M. E. Sharpe.
- Klintworth, G. (1989). Vietnam's intervention in Cambodia in international law. Australian Government Publishing Service.
- Morris, S. J. (1999). Why Vietnam invaded Cambodia: Political culture and the causes of war. Stanford University Press.
- O'Dowd, E. C. (2007). Chinese military strategy in the Third Indochina War: The last Maoist war. Routledge.
- Ray, H. (1983). China's Vietnam war. Radiant Publishers.
- Ross, R. S. (1988). The Indochina tangle: China's Vietnam policy, 1975–1979. Columbia University Press.
- Solomon, R. H. (2000). Exiting Indochina: U.S. leadership of the Cambodia settlement and normalization with Vietnam. United States Institute of Peace Press.
- Tretiak, D. (1979). China's Vietnam war and its consequences. The China Quarterly, 80, 740–767. doi:10.1017/s0305741000046038
- Womack, B. (2006). China and Vietnam: The politics of asymmetry. Cambridge University Press.
- Zhang, X. (2005). China's 1979 war with Vietnam: A reassessment. The China Quarterly, 184, 851–874. doi:10.1017/s0305741005000536
- Zhang, X. (2015). Deng Xiaoping's long war: The military conflict between China and Vietnam, 1979–1991. University of North Carolina Press.

=== Korea ===
==== North Korea ====
- Chung, J. H., & Choi, M.-H. (2013). Uncertain allies or uncomfortable neighbors? Making sense of China–North Korea relations, 1949–2010. The Pacific Review, 26(3), 243–264. doi:10.1080/09512748.2012.759262
- Harding, H. (1988). China and Northeast Asia: The political dimension. University Press of America.
- Jia, H., & Zhuang, Q. (1992). China's policy toward the Korean peninsula. Asian Survey, 32(12), 1137–1156. JSTOR 2645043
- Kim, S. S. (2006). The two Koreas and the great powers. Cambridge University Press.
- Kim, S. S., & Lee, T. H. (Eds.). (2002). North Korea and Northeast Asia. Rowman & Littlefield.
- Lee, C.-J. (1996). China and Korea: Dynamic relations. Hoover Institution Press.
- Scobell, A. (2004). China and North Korea: From comrades-in-arms to allies at arm's length. Strategic Studies Institute, U.S. Army War College.
- Snyder, S. (2009). China's rise and the two Koreas: Politics, economics, security. Lynne Rienner.

==== South Korea ====
- Chung, J. H. (1988). South Korea–China economic relations: The current situation and its implications. Asian Survey, 28(10), 1031–1048. JSTOR 2644705
- Chung, J. H. (2007). Between ally and partner: Korea–China relations and the United States. Columbia University Press.
- Dollar, D. (1989). South Korea–China trade relations: Problems and prospects. Asian Survey, 29(12), 1167–1176. JSTOR 2644763
- Harding, H. (1988). China and Northeast Asia: The political dimension. University Press of America.
- Jia, H., & Zhuang, Q. (1992). China's policy toward the Korean peninsula. Asian Survey, 32(12), 1137–1156. JSTOR 2645043
- Kim, S. S. (2006). The two Koreas and the great powers. Cambridge University Press.
- Lee, C.-J. (1996). China and Korea: Dynamic relations. Hoover Institution Press.
- Snyder, S. (2009). China's rise and the two Koreas: Politics, economics, security. Lynne Rienner.
- Suh, J. W. (1994). South Korea–China economic relations: Trends and prospects. Journal of Northeast Asian Studies, 13(4), 21–36. doi:10.1007/bf03023310

=== Southeast Asia ===
- Antolik, M. (1990). ASEAN and the diplomacy of accommodation. M. E. Sharpe.
- Bolt, P. J. (2000). China and Southeast Asia's ethnic Chinese: State and diaspora in contemporary Asia. Praeger.
- Kallgren, J. K., Sopiee, N., & Djiwandono, S. (Eds.). (1988). ASEAN and China: An evolving relationship. Institute of East Asian Studies, University of California, Berkeley.
- Lee, L. T. (1999). China and the South China Sea dialogues. Praeger.
- Sukma, R. (1999). Indonesia and China: The politics of a troubled relationship. Routledge.
- Suryadinata, L. (1985). China and the ASEAN states: The ethnic Chinese dimension. Singapore University Press.
- Tilman, R. O. (1987). Southeast Asia and the enemy beyond: ASEAN perceptions of external threats. Westview Press.

=== Hong Kong ===
- Brown, J. M., & Foot, R. (Eds.). (1997). Hong Kong's transitions, 1842–1997. Macmillan.
- Chan, M. K., & Clark, D. J. (Eds.). (1991). The Hong Kong Basic Law: Blueprint for "stability and prosperity" under Chinese sovereignty? M. E. Sharpe.
- Chan, M. K. (Ed.). (1994). Precarious balance: Hong Kong between China and Britain, 1842–1992. M. E. Sharpe.
- Cohen, W. I., & Zhao, L. (Eds.). (1997). Hong Kong under Chinese rule: The economic and political implications of reversion. Cambridge University Press.
- Cottrell, R. (1993). The end of Hong Kong: The secret diplomacy of imperial retreat. John Murray.
- Cradock, P. (1994). Experiences of China. John Murray.
- Ghai, Y. (1997). Hong Kong's new constitutional order: The resumption of Chinese sovereignty and the Basic Law. Hong Kong University Press.
- Hicks, G. L. (1989). Hong Kong countdown. Writers' & Publishers' Cooperative.
- Lane, K. P. (1990). Sovereignty and the status quo: The historical roots of China's Hong Kong policy. Westview Press.
- Lau, S.-K. (1982). Society and politics in Hong Kong. Chinese University Press.
- Lim, C. L. (2022). Treaty for a lost city: The Sino-British Joint Declaration. Cambridge University Press.
- Lo, S. H. (1997). The politics of democratization in Hong Kong. Macmillan.
- Mark, C. (2023). Decolonisation in the age of globalisation: Britain, China, and Hong Kong, 1979–89. Manchester University Press.
- Roberti, M. (1994). The fall of Hong Kong: China's triumph and Britain's betrayal. John Wiley & Sons.
- Scott, I. (1989). Political change and the crisis of legitimacy in Hong Kong. University of Hawaii Press.
- Sung, Y. W. (1991). The China–Hong Kong connection: The key to China's open door policy. Cambridge University Press.
- Tsang, S. (1997). Hong Kong: An appointment with China. I. B. Tauris.
- Wang, E. (1995). Hong Kong, 1997: The politics of transition. Lynne Rienner.
- Wesley-Smith, P. (1980). Unequal treaty, 1898–1997: China, Great Britain and Hong Kong's New Territories. Oxford University Press.

=== Taiwan ===
- Bush, R. C. (2004). At cross purposes: U.S.–Taiwan relations since 1942. M. E. Sharpe.
- Cheng, T., Huang, C., & Wu, S. S. G. (Eds.). (1995). Inherited rivalry: Conflict across the Taiwan Straits. Lynne Rienner.
- Chiu, H. (Ed.). (1979). China and the Taiwan issue. Praeger.
- Clough, R. N. (1978). Island China. Harvard University Press.
- Clough, R. N. (1993). Reaching across the Taiwan Strait: People-to-people diplomacy. Westview Press.
- Copper, J. F. (1992). China diplomacy: The Washington–Taipei–Beijing triangle. Westview Press.
- Garver, J. W. (1997). Face off: China, the United States, and Taiwan's democratization. University of Washington Press.
- Gibert, S. P., & Carpenter, W. M. (Eds.). (1989). America and island China: A documentary history. University Press of America.
- Hickey, D. V. V. (1994). United States–Taiwan security ties: From Cold War to beyond containment. Praeger.
- Kintner, W. R., & Copper, J. F. (1979). A matter of two Chinas. Foreign Policy Research Institute.
- Lasater, M. L. (1984). The Taiwan issue in Sino-American strategic relations. Westview Press.
- Lasater, M. L. (1989). Policy in evolution: The U.S. role in China's reunification. Westview Press.
- Lee, D. T. (2000). The making of the Taiwan Relations Act: Twenty years in retrospect. Oxford University Press.
- Liu, A. P. L. (1987). Phoenix and the lame lion: Modernization in Taiwan and mainland China, 1950–1980. Hoover Institution Press.
- Mosher, S. W. (1991). The United States and the Republic of China: Democratic friends, strategic allies, and economic partners. Transaction Publishers.
- Myers, R. H. (Ed.). (1989). A unique relationship: The United States and the Republic of China under the Taiwan Relations Act. Hoover Institution Press.
- Myers, R. H. (Ed.). (1991). Two societies in opposition: The Republic of China and the People's Republic of China after forty years. Hoover Institution Press.
- Romberg, A. D. (2003). Rein in at the brink of the precipice: American policy toward Taiwan and U.S.–PRC relations. Henry L. Stimson Center.
- Tucker, N. B. (1994). Taiwan, Hong Kong, and the United States, 1945–1992: Uncertain friendships. Twayne.
- Tucker, N. B. (2009). Strait talk: United States–Taiwan relations and the crisis with China. Harvard University Press.

=== International organizations ===
- Barnett, A. D. (1979). China and the world food system. Overseas Development Council.
- Economy, E., & Oksenberg, M. (Eds.). (1999). China joins the world: Progress and prospects. Council on Foreign Relations Press.
- Hartland-Thunberg, P. (1990). China, Hong Kong, Taiwan and the world trading system. Macmillan.
- Jacobson, H. K., & Oksenberg, M. (1990). China's participation in the IMF, the World Bank, and GATT: Toward a global economic order. University of Michigan Press.
- Johnston, A. I. (2008). Social states: China in international institutions, 1980–2000. Princeton University Press.
- Kent, A. (1999). China, the United Nations, and human rights: The limits of compliance. University of Pennsylvania Press.
- Kent, A. (2007). Beyond compliance: China, international organizations, and global security. Stanford University Press.
- Kim, S. S. (1979). China, the United Nations and world order. Princeton University Press.
- Kim, S. S. (1991). China in and out of the changing world order. Center of International Studies, Princeton University.
- Lardy, N. R. (1994). China in the world economy. Institute for International Economics.
- World Bank. (1983). China: Socialist economic development. World Bank.
- World Bank. (1985). China: Agriculture to the year 2000. World Bank.
- World Bank. (1985). China: Long-term development issues and options. Johns Hopkins University Press.
- Zhang, Y. (1998). China in international society since 1949: Alienation and beyond. Macmillan.

=== Developing world ===
- Bräutigam, D. (1998). Chinese aid and African development: Exporting green revolution. Macmillan.
- Calabrese, J. (1991). China's changing relations with the Middle East. Pinter.
- Deshpande, G. P., & Gupta, H. K. (1986). United front against imperialism: China's foreign policy in Africa. Somaiya Publications.
- Garver, J. W. (2001). Protracted contest: Sino-Indian rivalry in the twentieth century. University of Washington Press.
- Garver, J. W. (2006). China and Iran: Ancient partners in a post-imperial world. University of Washington Press.
- Harris, L. C. (1985). China's foreign policy toward the Third World. Praeger.
- Harris, L. C. (1993). China considers the Middle East. I. B. Tauris.
- Harris, L. C., & Worden, R. L. (Eds.). (1986). China and the Third World: Champion or challenger? Auburn House.
- Kim, S. S. (1989). The Third World in Chinese world policy. Center of International Studies, Princeton University.
- Kumaraswamy, P. R. (Ed.). (1999). China and the Middle East: The quest for influence. Sage.
- Shichor, Y. (1989). East wind over Arabia: Origins and implications of the Sino-Saudi missile deal. Center for Chinese Studies, University of California, Berkeley.
- Snow, P. (1988). The star raft: China's encounter with Africa. Weidenfeld & Nicolson.
- Taylor, I. (2006). China and Africa: Engagement and compromise. Routledge.

== Overseas Chinese communities ==
- Constable, N. (Ed.). (1996). Guest people: Hakka identity in China and abroad. University of Washington Press.
- Douw, L., Huang, C., & Godley, M. R. (Eds.). (1999). Qiaoxiang ties: Interdisciplinary approaches to "cultural capitalism" in South China. Kegan Paul International.
- Kuhn, P. A. (2008). Chinese among others: Emigration in modern times. Rowman & Littlefield.
- Lever-Tracy, C., Ip, D., & Tracy, N. (1996). The Chinese diaspora and mainland China: An emerging economic synergy. Macmillan.
- Nyíri, P. (2007). Chinese in Eastern Europe and Russia: A middleman minority in a transnational era. Routledge.
- Pan, L. (1990). Sons of the Yellow Emperor: A history of the Chinese diaspora. Little, Brown.
- Peterson, G. (2012). Overseas Chinese in the People's Republic of China. Routledge.
- Pieke, F. N., & Mallee, H. (Eds.). (1999). Internal and international migration: Chinese perspectives. Curzon Press.
- Pieke, F. N., Nyíri, P., Thunø, M., & Ceccagno, A. (2004). Transnational Chinese: Fujianese migrants in Europe. Stanford University Press.
- Tan, C.-B. (2004). Chinese overseas: Comparative cultural issues. Hong Kong University Press.
- Thunø, M. (Ed.). (2007). Beyond Chinatown: New Chinese migration and the global expansion of China. NIAS Press.
- Wang, G. (1981). Community and nation: Essays on Southeast Asia and the Chinese. Heinemann Educational Books.
- Wang, G. (1991). China and the Chinese overseas. Times Academic Press.
- Wang, G. (2000). The Chinese overseas: From earthbound China to the quest for autonomy. Harvard University Press.
- Wang, G. (2001). Don't leave home: Migration and the Chinese. Times Academic Press.
- Yow, C. H. (2013). Guangdong and Chinese diaspora: The changing landscape of qiaoxiang. Routledge.

== Regional studies ==
- Blecher, M., & Shue, V. (1996). Tethered deer: Government and economy in a Chinese county. Stanford University Press.
- Bramall, C. (1993). In praise of Maoist economic planning: Living standards and economic development in Sichuan since 1931. Clarendon Press.
- Breslin, S. G. (1996). China in the 1980s: Centre-province relations in a reforming socialist state. Macmillan.
- Cheung, P. T. Y., Chung, J. H., & Lin, Z. (Eds.). (1998). Provincial strategies of economic reform in post-Mao China: Leadership, politics, and implementation. M. E. Sharpe.
- Forster, K. (1998). Zhejiang in reform. Wild Peony.
- Goodman, D. S. G. (Ed.). (1989). China's regional development. Routledge.
- Goodman, D. S. G. (Ed.). (1997). China's provinces in reform: Class, community and political culture. Routledge.
- Hendrischke, H., & Feng, C. (Eds.). (1999). The political economy of China's provinces: Comparative and competitive advantage. Routledge.
- Li, L. C. (1998). Centre and provinces: China 1978–1993: Power as non-zero-sum. Clarendon Press.
- Lin, G. C. S. (1997). Red capitalism in South China: Growth and development of the Pearl River Delta. UBC Press.
- Moser, L. J. (1985). The Chinese mosaic: The peoples and provinces of China. Westview Press.
- Nolan, P., & Dong, F. (Eds.). (1990). Market forces in China: Competition and small business: The Wenzhou debate. Zed Books.
- Vermeer, E. B. (1988). Economic development in provincial China: The central Shaanxi since 1930. Cambridge University Press.
- Wang, S., & Hu, A. (1999). The political economy of uneven development: The case of China. M. E. Sharpe.
- White, L. T., III. (1998). Unstately power: Vol. 1. Local causes of China's economic reforms. M. E. Sharpe.
- Yang, D. L. (1997). Beyond Beijing: Liberalization and the regions in China. Routledge.
- Yeung, Y. M., & Chu, K. Y. (Eds.). (1994). Guangdong: Survey of a province undergoing rapid change. Chinese University Press.

== Comparative studies ==
- Bhalla, A. S. (1992). Uneven development in the Third World: A study of China and India. Macmillan.
- Chan, A., Kerkvliet, B. J. T., & Unger, J. (Eds.). (1999). Transforming Asian socialism: China and Vietnam compared. Rowman & Littlefield.
- Chirot, D. (Ed.). (1991). The crisis of Leninism and the decline of the left: The revolutions of 1989. University of Washington Press.
- Gurtov, M. (Ed.). (1990). The transformation of socialism: Perestroika and reform in the Soviet Union and China. Westview Press.
- Kornai, J. (1992). The socialist system: The political economy of communism. Princeton University Press.
- McCormick, B. L., & Unger, J. (Eds.). (1996). China after socialism: In the footsteps of Eastern Europe or East Asia? M. E. Sharpe.
- McMillan, J., & Naughton, B. (Eds.). (1996). Reforming Asian socialism: The growth of market institutions. University of Michigan Press.
- Meaney, C. S. (1988). Stability and the industrial elite in China and the Soviet Union. Center for Chinese Studies, University of California, Berkeley.
- Nee, V., & Stark, D. (Eds.). (1989). Remaking the economic institutions of socialism: China and Eastern Europe. Stanford University Press.
- Nolan, P. (1995). China's rise, Russia's fall: Politics, economics and planning in the transition from Stalinism. Macmillan.
- Pei, M. (1994). From reform to revolution: The demise of communism in China and the Soviet Union. Harvard University Press.
- Ray, H. (1988). China and Eastern Europe. Sangam Books.
- Rozman, G. (Ed.). (1992). Dismantling communism: Common causes and regional variations. Woodrow Wilson Center Press.
- Tong, Y. (1997). Transitions from state socialism: Economic and political change in Hungary and China. Rowman & Littlefield.
- Van Ness, P. (Ed.). (1989). Market reforms in socialist societies: Comparing China and Hungary. Lynne Rienner.
- Walder, A. G. (Ed.). (1995). The waning of the communist state: Economic origins of political decline in China and Hungary. University of California Press.
- Wu, Y.-S. (1994). Comparative economic transformations: Mainland China, Hungary, the Soviet Union, and Taiwan. Stanford University Press.

== Biographies ==
- Chang, D. W. (1984). Zhou Enlai and Deng Xiaoping in the Chinese leadership succession crisis. University Press of America.
- Deng, M. (1995). Deng Xiaoping: My father. Basic Books.
- Evans, R. (1993). Deng Xiaoping and the making of modern China. Hamish Hamilton.
- Goodman, D. S. G. (1994). Deng Xiaoping and the Chinese revolution: A political biography. Routledge.
- Lee, C. H. (1985). Deng Xiaoping: The Marxist road to the Forbidden City. Kingston Press.
- Marti, M. E. (2002). China and the legacy of Deng Xiaoping: From communist revolution to capitalist evolution. Brassey's.
- Pantsov, A. V., & Levine, S. I. (2015). Deng Xiaoping: A revolutionary life. Oxford University Press.
- Ruan, M. (1994). Deng Xiaoping: Chronicle of an empire (N. Liu, P. Rand, & L. R. Sullivan, Eds. & Trans.). Westview Press.
- Shambaugh, D. L. (1984). The making of a premier: Zhao Ziyang's provincial career. Westview Press.
- Suettinger, R. L. (2024). The conscience of the party: Hu Yaobang, China's communist reformer. Harvard University Press.
- Terrill, R. (1984). The white-boned demon: A biography of Madame Mao Zedong. Heinemann.
- Torigian, J. (2025). The party's interests come first: The life of Xi Zhongxun, father of Xi Jinping. Stanford University Press.
- Vogel, E. F. (2011). Deng Xiaoping and the transformation of China. Belknap Press of Harvard University Press.
- Weatherley, R. (2010). Mao's forgotten successor: The political career of Hua Guofeng. Palgrave Macmillan.
- Yang, B. (1998). Deng: A political biography. M. E. Sharpe.
- Yang, Z. (1988). Hu Yaobang: A Chinese biography. M. E. Sharpe.

== Primary sources ==
- Barmé, G., & Minford, J. (Eds.). (1986). Seeds of fire: Chinese voices of conscience. Far Eastern Economic Review.
- Benton, G., & Hunter, A. (Eds.). (1995). Wild lily, prairie fire: China's road to democracy, Yan'an to Tian'anmen, 1942–1989. Princeton University Press.
- Benton, G. (Ed.). (1982). Wild lilies, poisonous weeds: Dissident voices from People's China. Pluto Press.
- Chan, A., Rosen, S., & Unger, J. (Eds.). (1985). On socialist democracy and the Chinese legal system: The Li Yizhe debates. M. E. Sharpe.
- Chen, R. (1982). Democracy Wall and the unofficial journals. Center for Chinese Studies, University of California, Berkeley.
- Cheng, J. C. (Ed.). (1980). Documents of dissent: Chinese political thought since Mao. Hoover Institution Press.
- Fang, L. (1990). Bringing down the Great Wall: Writings on science, culture, and democracy in China (J. H. Williams, Ed. & Trans.). Alfred A. Knopf.
- Goodman, D. S. G. (1981). Beijing street voices: The poetry and politics of China's democracy movement. Marion Boyars.
- Lau, J. S. M., & Goldblatt, H. (Eds.). (1995). The Columbia anthology of modern Chinese literature. Columbia University Press.
- Lawrance, A. (2004). China since 1919: Revolution and reform: A sourcebook. Routledge.
- Liu, B. (1983). People or monsters? And other stories and reportage from China after Mao (P. Link, Ed.). Indiana University Press.
- Liu, X. (1990). Black walls and other stories. Research Centre for Translation, Chinese University of Hong Kong.
- Siu, H. F., & Stern, Z. (Eds.). (1983). Mao's harvest: Voices from China's new generation. Oxford University Press.
- Wei, J. (1997). The courage to stand alone: Letters from prison and other writings (K. M. Torgeson, Ed. & Trans.). Viking.
- Zhang, X., & Sang, Y. (1987). Chinese lives: An oral history of contemporary China (W. J. F. Jenner & D. Davin, Eds.). Pantheon Books.

=== Memoirs ===
- Cradock, P. (1994). Experiences of China. John Murray.
- Fang, L. (2016). The most wanted man in China: My journey from scientist to enemy of the state (P. Link, Trans.). Henry Holt.
- Goldstein, M. C., Siebenschuh, W. R., & Tsering, T. (1997). The struggle for modern Tibet: The autobiography of Tashi Tsering. M. E. Sharpe.
- Gyatso, T. (1990). Freedom in exile: The autobiography of the Dalai Lama. HarperCollins.
- Holdridge, J. H. (1997). Crossing the divide: An insider's account of the normalization of U.S.–China relations. Rowman & Littlefield.
- Hooper, B. (1979). Inside Peking: A personal report. Macdonald and Jane's.
- Liang, H., & Shapiro, J. (1983). Son of the revolution. Knopf.
- Liu, B. (1990). A higher kind of loyalty: A memoir by China's foremost journalist (H. Zhu, Trans.). Pantheon Books.
- Wu, H., & Wakeman, C. (1994). Bitter winds: A memoir of my years in China's gulag. Wiley.
- Zhao, Z. (2009). Prisoner of the state: The secret journal of Premier Zhao Ziyang. Simon & Schuster.

=== Official documents ===
- Burns, J. P. (Ed.). (1989). The Chinese Communist Party's nomenklatura system: A documentary study of party control of leadership selection, 1979–1984. M. E. Sharpe.
- Communist Party of China. (1981). Resolution on CPC history (1949–81). Pergamon Press.
- Communist Party of China. (1982). The Twelfth National Congress of the CPC (September 1982). Foreign Languages Press.
- Deng, X. (1984). Selected works of Deng Xiaoping (1975–1982). Foreign Languages Press.
- Deng, X. (1984). Speeches and writings. Pergamon Press.
- Deng, X. (1987). Fundamental issues in present-day China. Foreign Languages Press.
- Deng, X. (1994). Selected works of Deng Xiaoping (Vol. 3, 1982–1992). Foreign Languages Press.
- National People's Congress. (1983). Fifth session of the Fifth National People's Congress (main documents). Foreign Languages Press.

== Historiography and memory ==
=== Memory studies ===
- Cook, A. C. (2016). The Cultural Revolution on trial: Mao and the Gang of Four. Cambridge University Press.
- Denton, K. A. (2014). Exhibiting the past: Historical memory and the politics of museums in postsocialist China. University of Hawai'i Press.
- Feng, J. (1991). Voices from the whirlwind: An oral history of the Chinese Cultural Revolution. Pantheon Books.
- Hillenbrand, M. (2020). Negative exposures: Knowing what not to know in contemporary China. Duke University Press.
- Lee, C. K., & Yang, G. (Eds.). (2007). Re-envisioning the Chinese revolution: The politics and poetics of collective memories in reform China. Stanford University Press.
- Li, J. (2020). Utopian ruins: A memorial museum of the Mao era. Duke University Press.
- Wang, B. (2004). Illuminations from the past: Trauma, memory, and history in modern China. Stanford University Press.
- Watson, R. S. (Ed.). (1994). Memory, history, and opposition under state socialism. School of American Research Press.

=== Historiography ===
- Barnouin, B., & Yu, C. (1993). Ten years of turbulence: The Chinese Cultural Revolution. Kegan Paul International.
- Chong, W. L. (Ed.). (2002). China's Great Proletarian Cultural Revolution: Master narratives and post-Mao counternarratives. Rowman & Littlefield.
- Gao, M. (2008). The battle for China's past: Mao and the Cultural Revolution. Pluto Press.
- Han, D. (2000). The unknown Cultural Revolution: Educational reforms and their impact on China's rural development. Garland.
- Johnson, I. (2023). Sparks: China's underground historians and their battle for the future. Oxford University Press.
- Law, K.-Y. (Ed.). (2003). The Chinese Cultural Revolution reconsidered: Beyond purge and holocaust. Palgrave Macmillan.
- Lu, X. (2004). Rhetoric of the Chinese Cultural Revolution: The impact on Chinese thought, culture and communication. University of South Carolina Press.
- Martin, D. A. L. (1990). The making of a Sino-Marxist world view: Perceptions and interpretations of world history in the People's Republic of China. M. E. Sharpe.
- Thurston, A. F. (1987). Enemies of the people: The ordeal of the intellectuals in China's Great Cultural Revolution. Knopf.
- Unger, J. (Ed.). (1993). Using the past to serve the present: Historiography and politics in contemporary China. M. E. Sharpe.
- Yan, J., & Gao, G. (1996). Turbulent decade: A history of the Cultural Revolution (D. W. Y. Kwok, Trans.). University of Hawai'i Press.

== Reference works ==
- Bartke, W. (1987). Who's who in the People's Republic of China (2nd ed.). K. G. Saur.
- Bartke, W. (1990). Biographical dictionary and analysis of China's party leadership, 1922–1988. K. G. Saur.
- Hook, B. (Ed.). (1991). The Cambridge encyclopedia of China (2nd ed.). Cambridge University Press.
- Lamb, M. (1994). Directory of officials and organizations in China: A quarter-century guide. M. E. Sharpe.
- Lo, B. L. C. (1983). Research guide to education in China after Mao, 1977–1981. Centre of Asian Studies, University of Hong Kong.
- Mackerras, C. (1982). Modern China: A chronology from 1842 to the present. Thames and Hudson.
- Mackerras, C., & Yorke, A. (1991). The Cambridge handbook of contemporary China. Cambridge University Press.
- Pan, L. (Ed.). (1998). The encyclopedia of the Chinese overseas. Archipelago Press.
- Scherer, J. L. (Ed.). (1986). China: Facts and figures annual (Vol. 9). Academic International Press.
- State Statistical Bureau. (1982). Statistical yearbook of China 1981 (English ed.). Economic Information & Agency.
- Sullivan, L. R., & Hearst, N. (1997). Historical dictionary of the People's Republic of China, 1949–1997. Scarecrow Press.
- Worden, R. L., Savada, A. M., & Dolan, R. E. (Eds.). (1988). China: A country study (4th ed.). Headquarters, Department of the Army.

== See also ==
- 1989 Tiananmen Square protests and massacre
- Bibliography of Chinese history
- Bibliography of the Cold War
- Boluan Fanzheng
- China–United States relations
- Democracy Wall
- Deng Xiaoping
- Deng Xiaoping Theory
- Four Modernizations
- History of China (1976–1989)
- Household responsibility system
- Hu Yaobang
- One-child policy
- Reform and opening up
- Sino-British Joint Declaration
- Special economic zones of China
- Township and Village Enterprises
- Zhao Ziyang
