= Chinese History: A New Manual =

Book by Endymion Wilkinson

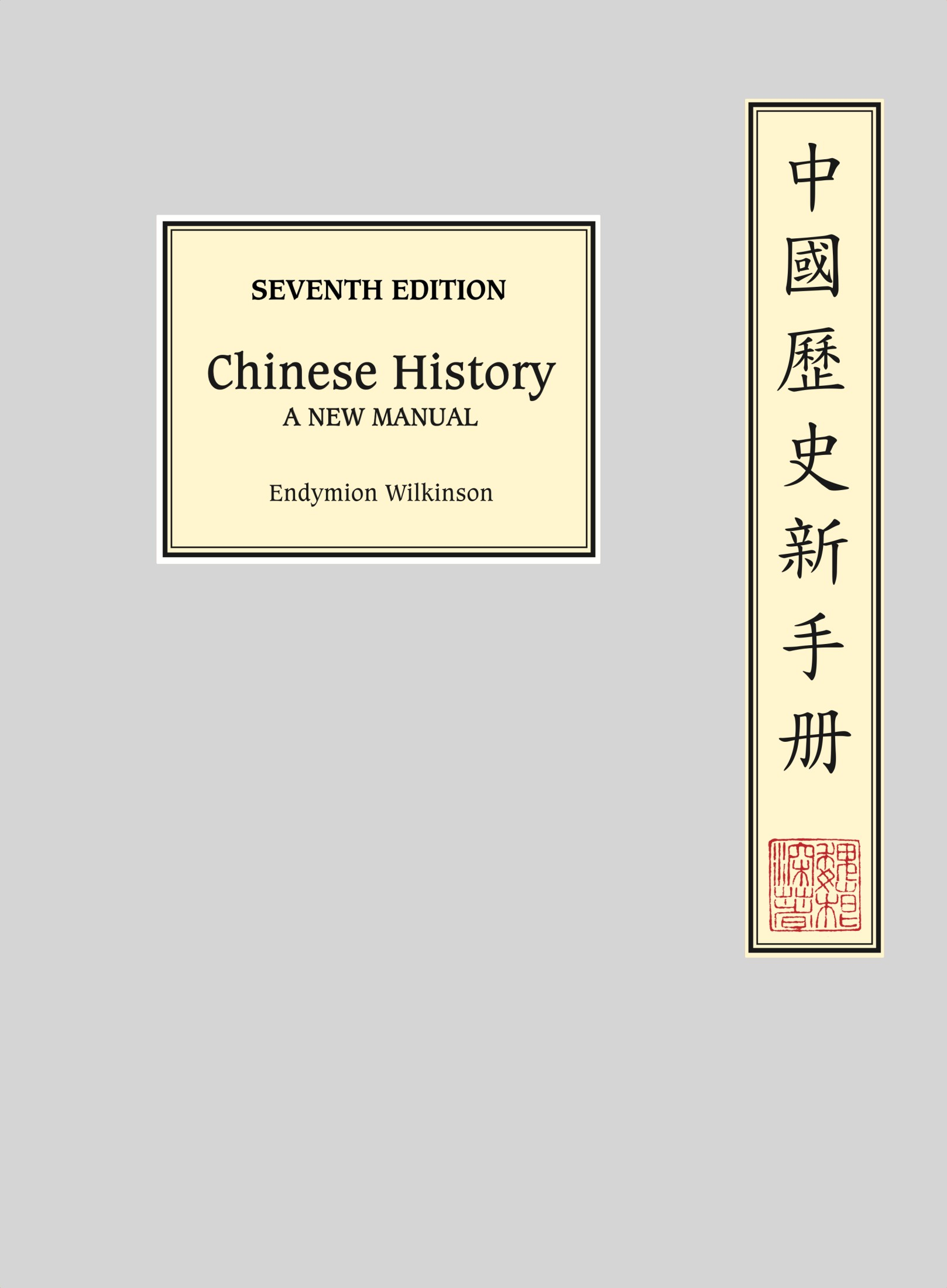
- Cover of the Seventh Edition (2025)
- Author: Endymion Wilkinson
- Original title: The History of Imperial China: A Research Guide
- Language: English
- Published: 2025 (7th ed.) Previous editions: 1973; 1998; 2000; 2012; 2015; 2017; 2022; 2025
- Publisher: Pleco Software
- Media type: ebook
- ISBN: 978-0-998-88832-3

Chinese History: A New Manual
- Traditional Chinese: 中國歷史新手册
- Simplified Chinese: 中国历史新手册
Transcriptions
Standard Mandarin
- Hanyu Pinyin: Zhōngguó lìshǐ xīn shǒucè
- Wade–Giles: Chung1-kuo2 li4-shih3 hsin1 shou3-ts'e2

Chinese History: A New Manual (Chinese: 中國歷史新手册; pinyin: Zhōngguó lìshǐ xīn shǒucè), seventh edition (2025) by Endymion Wilkinson, is an encyclopedic guide to Sinology and Chinese history. The Manual evaluates published, excavated, artifactual, and archival sources from Chinese pre-history to the twenty-first century, selects up-to-date scholarship and research tools in Chinese, Japanese, and Western languages, and outlines the 31 ancillary disciplines that Chinese historians use. Introductions to each of the chapters and short essays give often witty summaries of major topics for specialists and general readers, as well as directives on the uses of history and avoidance of error in thought and analysis.

Since the appearance of a preliminary version in 1973, the Manual has been continuously updated and enlarged from a research guide of 70,000 words to a reference work of 1.5 million words (the equivalent of 15 monographs). The Third edition won the 2014 Prix Stanislas Julien, the top international prize in Sinology awarded by the French Academy. In 2016, Peking University Press published a three-volume Chinese-language translation of the fourth edition which sold 13,000 copies. The seventh edition (2025) has been thoroughly updated and is for the first time published not in print but as a standalone ebook for use on smartphones, laptops, tablets, and desktops.

== Background ==
In an interview with Carla Nappi, an historian of China at the University of British Columbia, Wilkinson discussed his experience in the field and the book's background. He became interested in China as an undergraduate at Cambridge University in the early 1960s, then spent two years teaching English in Beijing up to the outbreak of the Cultural Revolution. He earned a PhD from Princeton University with a dissertation on late Qing dynasty markets and prices, but when he began teaching, he still felt unprepared. He did not know, he recalled, what to tell his graduate students about the Zhou or Shang dynasties, about which he felt his knowledge would hardly "fill an eye bath." On a research fellowship at Harvard University in 1971, Wilkinson mentioned to John Fairbank, a senior Harvard scholar, that he was gathering notes on Chinese history to fill the gaps in his knowledge. Fairbank offered to publish them, and the 1973 Research Guide appeared in due course.

Wilkinson served in Beijing as the European Union Ambassador to China and Mongolia from 1994 to 2001, and in his spare moments turned the 1973 Research Guide into the first and second editions of the Manual. After he retired from the EU in 2001, Harvard invited him to teach Chinese history, including a graduate seminar on Sinological methods. From then on he worked on the New Manual, commuting between Harvard and Peking University (where he was a visiting professor).

== The Seventh Edition (2025) ==
The two quarto volumes of the sixth edition weighed 5 kilos (11 lbs.) and therefore the decision was taken that the seventh (2025) and subsequent editions of the Manual would be exclusively published by Pleco Software in digital format, not print. The format chosen (EPUB) enables the text to automatically adjust to different screen sizes. This gives readers the choice of consulting the Manual as a standalone ebook on a smartphone, a tablet, or a desktop computer and of altering the size of the text for easy reading. The Seventh edition is available from Amazon, Apple, and Pleco.

The author explains the principal aims, updates, content, and layout of the seventh edition of the Manual in the Preface:

=== Aims ===
Millions of sources survive from Chinese history. The Manual selects and introduces the essential ones along with the skills and tools necessary to use them. Leading research results, hypotheses, and controversies in the field are also introduced. At the same time, the author writes, he has endeavored to:

1. Highlight long-term changes in the course of Chinese history and by doing so provide an antidote to nationalistic, teleological history (the default mode of Chinese historiography for the last 125 years).

2. Introduce topics not normally addressed in the secondary literature by asking unexpected questions. For example, what did Zhu Xi have for breakfast? The answer requires a deep dive into the history of regional crops, diet, personal income, and changing lifestyles.

3. Supply readers who are familiar with one period a springboard into others with which they are less familiar.

4. Profile the strengths and weaknesses of Chinese historiographical traditions because (i) of the central role that the writing of history played (and continues to play) in Chinese culture and politics and (ii) to a greater extent than is commonly realized, historians today rely on works produced in the old styles, even though they may ask different questions and use different conceptual frameworks.

5. Provide reliable English translations of key Chinese concepts both in the main text and in the terminological boxes and tables.

=== Updates ===
The seventh edition of the Manual is more thoroughly updated than previous editions because editing a stand-alone ebook is easier than editing a print one. The author is not constrained by the tyranny of page layout or worries about having to reset the entire book if too many alterations are made.

The seventh edition contains over 31,000 textual changes comprising everything from the insertion of new sections, updates of old ones, and the correction of typos. In all, newly added text totals about 120,000 words including over 1,500 new citations. To prevent bloat, thousands of deletions have also been made (including superseded citations).

Thanks to over 9,000 cross-reference links and 450 links to global digital resources, it is much easier to find things in the seventh edition.

=== Content & Layout ===
As in previous editions, the seventh edition of the Manual is organized in two ways—by subject and chronologically by period. The chronological chapters (Books X to XIV) complement the subject chapters (Books I to IX and XV) and are linked to them with clickable cross-references. The subject chapters cover language, family & kin, geography, governing, education, war, law, ideas, beliefs & the arts, agriculture & food, technology & science, trade, and traditional historiography. They account for 76 percent of the text. The remaining 24 percent is devoted to prehistory followed by the dynasties in chronological order. The 20th century gets the most detailed treatment: the 67 years of the ROC & PRC have an average of 1,500 words per year compared to the prior 4,000 years which get an average of 60 words per year. Indeed, because Book XIII (20th century) became so large it has been split into two (Book XIII is now on the Republic and Book XIV is on the Mao era). What was Book XIV (on bibliography) in previous editions is now the new Book XV.

Digital resources are introduced at §45.5 and links are provided throughout the Manual. Print reference works, including general histories, guides, readers, and historical encyclopedias are at §45.1–§45.4.

Those not familiar with the terminology and conventions of Chinese manuscripts, printing, and book culture are advised to turn to Book XV (on the history of the Chinese book and Chinese historical bibliography). Chapter 76, the final one, is on how to keep up to date with new scholarship.

== Successive Editions Compared ==
Over the 50 years from 1973 to 2025, the Manual has gone through eight editions each of which added new topics and updated, revised, and corrected the previous one. The main changes were as follows (for publishers, see Editions).

Preliminary edition (1973, red cover with the title, The History of Imperial China: A Research Guide): coverage was limited to the socioeconomic history of imperial China; total words: 70,000.

1^{st} edition (1988, navy blue cover with the title, The History of China: A Manual): completely updated. Most domains of Chinese history were covered, and the pre-Qin was included. 46 in-text boxes & tables were featured. Total words: 400,000.

2^{nd} edition (2000, yellow cover): updated; coverage extended to the Republican period; 100,000 words of new content.

3^{rd} edition (2012, crimson cover with the title that was retained for all subsequent editions, The History of China: A New Manual): major update with a new arrangement of content, a new format, and new sections; a total of 274 boxes and tables were featured, and the book size was increased from octavo to quarto. Total words: 1,500,000.

4^{th} edition (2015, racing green cover): updated, corrected, and expanded the 3^{rd} edition; 100,000 words of updated content added.

5^{th} edition (2018, light blue cover): updated, corrected, and expanded the 4^{th} edition; green underlining indicated the censored passages in the Peking University Press, Chinese-language edition (2016). 130,000 words of new content were added. It was also available on the Pleco Software platform as an add-on.

6^{th} edition (2022, coral cover). The last print edition of the Manual, now superseded by the 7th edition: a major update published in two volumes totaling 5 kilos (11 lbs.); coverage was extended to the end of the Mao era; 200,000 words of new content were added, and 468 boxes and tables featured. It was also available on the Pleco Software platform as an add-on.

7^{th} edition (2025, pale grey cover). See The Seventh Edition.

== Reception ==
Third edition: Professor Nappi judged the New Manual (2012), “in every way, absolutely indispensable to work in Chinese history” and journalist and China scholar, Jonathan Mirsky reviewing it in the New York Review of Books judged it to be "A mighty book...magnificent."

Fourth edition: "For any student of China (and at every level), Chinese History: A New Manual is not only a masterful scholarly endeavor, it is also (happily) a real page turner indeed, with captivating insights on every page."

Fifth edition: "The Fifth Edition of Wilkinson’s Manual is the indispensable guide for Sinologists of all stripes. A monumental achievement!" Victor H. Mair (Professor of Chinese Language and Literature, University of Pennsylvania) quoted on the back cover of the Fifth edition (2018).

"A magnificent achievement; the most valuable English-language reference book on China anywhere." Richard H. Smith (Professor Emeritus of History, Rice University) quoted on the back cover of the Fifth edition (2018).

“Wilkinson displays a mastery of a vast array of topics and subfields… No one undertaking serious research about Chinese history…should be without it.” Bruce Rusk in the Journal of Asian Studies.

Sixth edition: “Although originally intended for use by graduate students, it is an essential reference for even the most casual sinologist, with its pithy explanations of key historical and cultural issues, and extensive bibliographies for those who want to delve deeper.” Peter Neville-Hadley in the South China Morning Post.

“A monument of scholarship, one of the great works on China published in English (or any other language) in the last hundred years.” Lee Moore in China Books Review.

== Editions ==
- Wilkinson, Endymion (1973). The History of Imperial China: A Research Guide. Harvard East Asian Monographs 49. Cambridge: East Asian Research Center, Harvard University. ISBN 978-0-674-39680-7. OCLC 658154. Reprinted with corrections, 1974; reprinted 1975, 1990, 1992.
- —— (1998). Chinese history: A Manual. Harvard-Yenching Institute monograph series 46 (1 ed.). Cambridge: Harvard University Asia Center. ISBN 978-0-674-12377-9. OCLC 38438876.
- —— (2000). Chinese History: A Manual. Harvard-Yenching Institute monograph series 52 (2 ed.). Cambridge: Harvard University Asia Center. ISBN 978-0-674-00247-0. OCLC 42772193.
- —— (2012). Chinese History: A New Manual. Harvard-Yenching Institute monograph series 84 (3 ed.). Cambridge: Harvard University Asia Center. ISBN 978-0-674-06715-8. OCLC 830027923. 2nd printing (revised), March 2013; 3rd printing (revised), September 2013.
- —— (2015). Chinese History: A New Manual. Harvard-Yenching Institute monograph series 100 (4 ed.). Cambridge: Harvard University Asia Center. ISBN 978-0-674-08846-7. OCLC 903436716.
- —— (2016). 中国历史研究手册. Beijing: Peking University Press. ISBN 9787301263938. 3 vols. Translation of the Fourth Edition.
- —— (2018). Chinese History: A New Manual (5 ed.). Cambridge: Harvard University Asia Center. ISBN 978-0-9988883-0-9. OCLC 1006640418.
- —— (2022). Chinese History: A New Manual. Harvard-Yenching Institute monograph series 127–128 (6 (anniversary) ed.). Cambridge: Harvard University Asia Center. ISBN 978-0-674-26018-4. OCLC 1284919787. 2 vols.
- —— (2025). Chinese History: A New Manual (7 (EBOOK) ed.). Wilton CT: Pleco Software. ISBN 978-0-998-88832-3. OCLC 658154.
