= Melissa J. Brown =

American anthropologist, historian, and sinologist

Melissa J. Brown (born 3 March 1963) is an American sinologist, anthropologist, and historian specializing in China and Taiwan. She earned a bachelor's and a master's degree from Stanford University, and completed doctoral study at the University of Washington.

== Selected publications ==
- Brown, Melissa J., ed. (2008). Explaining Culture Scientifically. University of Washington Press. ISBN 978-0-295-98789-7.
- Brown, Melissa J. (2004). Is Taiwan Chinese?. University of California Press. ISBN 978-0-520-23182-5.
- Brown, Melissa J. (1996). Negotiating Ethnicities in China and Taiwan. Routledge/Curzon. ISBN 978-1-55729-048-9.
