= Endymion Wilkinson =

British sinologist and diplomat (born 1941)

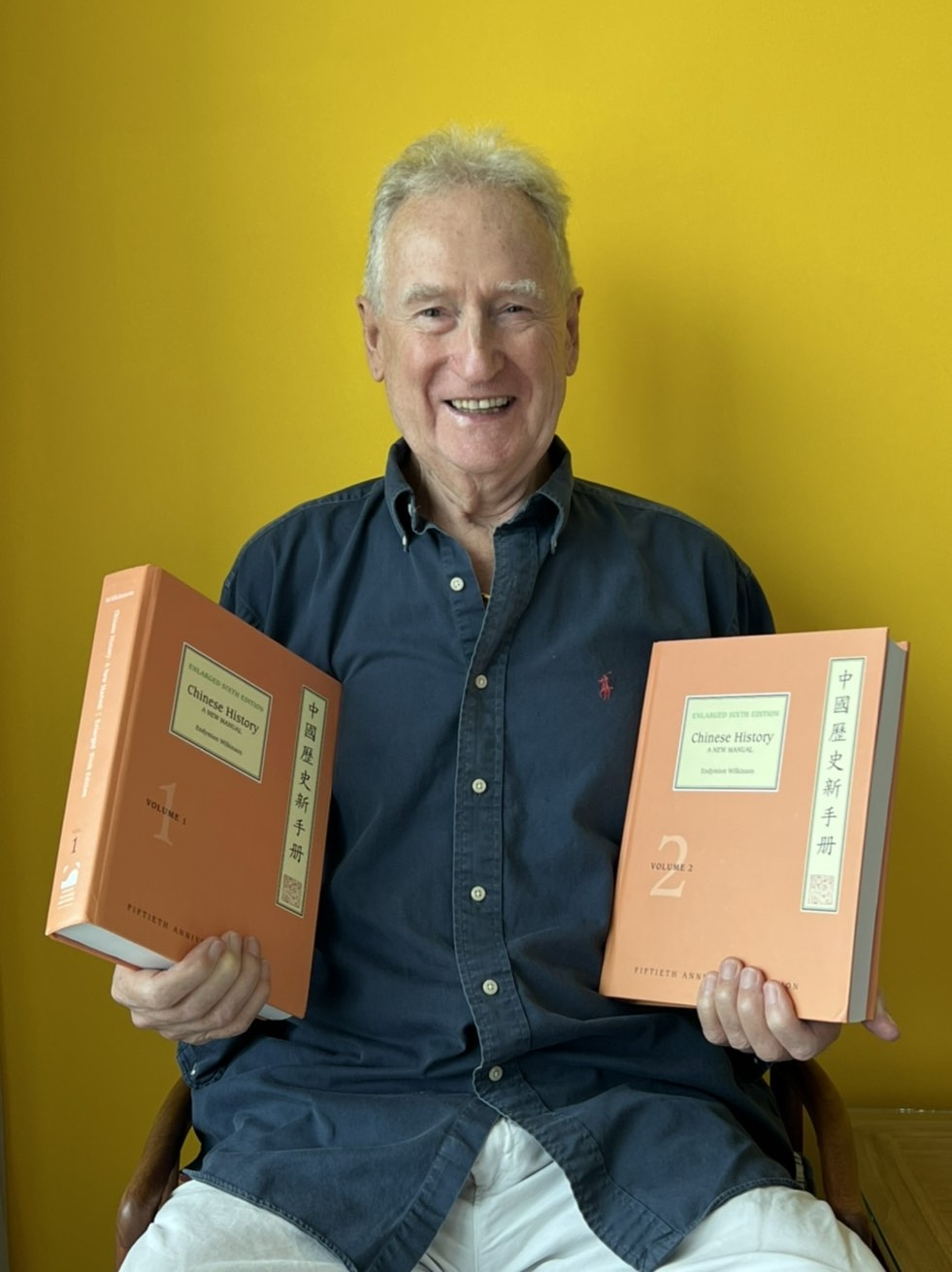
- Wilkinson holding the two heavy volumes of his sixth edition
- Born: 15 May 1941 (age 85); Lewes, England
- Education: King's College, Cambridge (BA, MA); Princeton University (PhD)
- Scientific career
- Fields: Sinology, Japanopology, Southeast Asian studies
- Workplaces: SOAS, University of London; European Commission; Harvard University; Peking University

Chinese name
- Chinese: 魏根深
Transcriptions
Standard Mandarin
- Hanyu Pinyin: Wèi Gēnshēn

Endymion Porter Wilkinson (born 15 May 1941) is a British sinologist and diplomat who served as the European Union Ambassador to China and Mongolia from 1994 to 2001. He is particularly noted for Chinese History: A New Manual, an authoritative guide to Sinology and Chinese history covering topics, primary sources, and scholarship from earliest times to 1976. The Manual has been continuously in print from its first appearance in 1973 to the Seventh edition (2025). The Third edition won the Prix Stanislas Julien in 2014 and in 2016 Peking University Press published a three-volume Chinese-language edition. The current edition is digitally published in EPUB format, making it easy for the author to update and for readers to consult on different screen sizes from smartphones to desktop computers.

== Early life and education ==
Wilkinson was born in the parish of Westmeston near Lewes, England, and educated at Gordonstoun School and King's College, Cambridge where he studied History and Oriental Studies (BA 1964; MA 1966). Shortly before graduation he was recruited by the Chinese government to teach English in Beijing at the Peking Institute of Languages. His two-year contract (1964–1966) ended just as the Cultural Revolution was beginning. From Beijing, he went to Princeton University where, in 1970, he completed a PhD in Chinese history under James T.C. Liu and Frederick W. Mote.

== Career ==
From 1970 to 1974, Wilkinson was lecturer in the History of the Far East at the School of Oriental and African Studies (SOAS), University of London (the official history of SOAS refers to him as "the most promising Sinologist of the early 1970s"). However, when he began teaching there he still felt unprepared. He did not know, he recalled many years later, what to tell his graduate students about the Zhou or Shang dynasties, about which he felt his knowledge would about "fill an eye dropper." As a research fellow at Harvard University in 1971, Wilkinson mentioned to John Fairbank, a senior Harvard scholar, that he was gathering notes on Chinese history. Fairbank offered to publish them, and the 1973 Research Guide appeared in due course. During these years he also translated two books from the Chinese: one popular (The People's Comic Book); the other, academic (Landlord and Labor in Late Imperial China).

While on academic study leave in 1974, Wilkinson was asked by the European Commission to find the building and recruit the local staff for the EU's permanent diplomatic delegation to Japan. Shortly thereafter, he quit academe, joined the commission's External Relations Directorate General and was posted to Tokyo as First Secretary (Economic) during the intensification of EU-Japan trade frictions (1974–1979).

In 1980, Wilkinson published Gokai 誤解 (Misunderstanding). In it, he examined both sides of the trade frictions coin: Were Japanese successes on US and European markets due to the fact that Westerners were lazy and ignorant about Japanese markets (in sharp contrast to the Japanese who were industrious and well-informed about the West), as many Japanese argued? Or was Japan deliberately keeping its markets closed and therefore operating with an unfair advantage (as many Westerners claimed)? For a brief period in the Summer of 1980, the book became the number one non-fiction best seller in Japan. It was also made into a four-hour TV documentary by TBS (Tokyo Broadcasting System). The series was presented by Wilkinson and featured numerous interview subjects including French anthropologist Claude Lévi-Strauss and Eugen Loderer, Chairman of IG Metall (the Union of German Metal Workers). The program also featured actors Alain Delon and Keiko Kishi. It was broadcast in Tokyo on 9–12 March 1980 and in the rest of Japan that April. Gokai was also published in new expanded editions in English, Italian, German, Chinese, and French. By 1992, it had sold a total of 250,000 copies. The book was well received, not only in Japan, but also in Europe and America: "This wry history of how each side has caricatured the other serves as an introduction to the topic which dominates relations today: trade. Neither side gets off lightly" wrote the Economist reviewer. The editor of the Frankfurter Allgemeine Zeitung, Jürgen Eicke suggested the book was "Essential for everyone in economic circles who has any contact with Japan." "Both well-informed and witty..." wrote Claude Levi-Strauss, "I learned a great deal from it and it gave me food for thought too." James Fallows, writing in the New York Review of Books, skipped the economic arguments and while praising Wilkinson's discussion of Japanese and Western images of each other, objected that his approach "pushes him toward the bizarre position of implying that the more often foreigners have observed a certain trait about Japan, the more likely it is to be false, not true."

In 1975, Wilkinson was sent by the European Commission to Beijing to make preparations for and participate in the talks between Christopher Soames and Zhou Enlai leading to the establishment of EU-China diplomatic relations. Wilkinson later served as head of the China desk in Brussels (1979–1982) and took part in many official talks in Beijing with China's most senior leaders. In 1981, he produced the blueprint for the forerunner of the China Europe International Business School. Between 1982 and 1987, he was DCM (Deputy Chief of Mission) in the EU's Bangkok Delegation (covering most of the Southeast Asian countries). Before becoming a director of the European Commission and his appointment as EU Ambassador to China in 1994, Wilkinson served as head of the Southeast Asia and Asia divisions in the commission (1988–1994). Among his activities at this time was the launch of a $100 million program to provide loans to 170,000 Vietnamese boat people refugees to enable them to start businesses on returning to Vietnam.

As ambassador to China, Wilkinson proposed and later oversaw the switching of the focus of EU grant aid to China from agricultural projects (notably the development of dairy farming) to all forms of education (notably the founding of the China Europe International Business School [CEIBS] in Shanghai). During his seven years as ambassador EU grant aid to China increased very substantially (to 250 million euro). Wilkinson also served as the deputy head under Pascal Lamy of the European Commission negotiating team for China's entry into the World Trade Organization.

After taking early retirement from the European Commission in 2001, Wilkinson lectured at Harvard (2001–2006), at Tsinghua University (2005), and at Peking University (2011–12). He has also been a visiting professor at Chinese Language and Culture University (1999–), and at Peking University (2001–2004; 2006–2014).

His main publications from 1998 have been progressive updates and expansions of his manual of Chinese history, of which, since the publication of the preliminary edition (titled Research Guide) in 1973, over 35,000 copies have been sold (including 13,000 copies of the Chinese-language edition). The Enlarged Sixth (Fiftieth Anniversary) edition appeared in two volumes in 2022 weighing 5 kilos. Given the encyclopedic size and weight of this edition the decision was taken to publish the Seventh edition (2025) as a digital, not a print edition. The publisher is Pleco and the format is EPUB. This enables the text to adjust to fit different screen sizes, making it ideal for smartphones, tablets, and e-readers (on desktop computers).

== Books ==
- – (translator), The People's Comic Book; Red Women's Detachment, Hot on the Trail and Other Chinese Comics. Garden City, N.Y.: Anchor Press. 1973. ISBN 0385005415.
- —— (1973). The History of Imperial China; a Research Guide, Preliminary edition. Cambridge, MA: East Asian Research Center, Harvard University; distributed by Harvard University Press. ISBN 0674396804.
- —— (1980). Studies in Chinese Price History. New York: Garland. ISBN 0674508661.
- – (translator), Su Ching; Luo Lun (1978). Landlord and Labor in Late Imperial China: Case Studies from Shandong. Harvard University Press. ISBN 0674508661.
- —— (1980). 誤解・ヨーロッパ vs. 日本 (Misunderstanding: Europe vs Japan). Tokyo: 中央公論社 Chuo Koronsha. NCID BN01210398.
- —— (1980). Japan versus Europe: A History of Misunderstanding. London, England; New York: Penguin Books. ISBN 0140224696.
- —— (1982). 誤解・ヨーロッパ vs. 日本 增補改訂版 (Misunderstanding: Europe versus Japan, Revised and enlarged ed.). Tokyo: 中央公論社 Chuo Koronsha C Books. NCID BN01210398.
- —— (1990). Japan Versus the West: Image and Reality. London, England; New York: Penguin Books. ISBN 0140126368.
- —— (1991). Japan Versus the West: Image and Reality (with revisions). London, England; New York: Penguin Books. ISBN 0140158871.
- —— (1992). 誤解 : 日米欧摩擦の解剖学 (Misunderstanding: Anatomy of Japan-US-Europe Frictions). Tokyo: 中央公論社 Chuo Koronsha. ISBN 4120020894.
- —— (1998). Chinese History: A Manual. Cambridge, MA: Harvard University Asia Center distributed by Harvard University Press. ISBN 0674123786.
- —— (2000). Chinese History: A Manual, 2nd edition, Revised and Enlarged. Cambridge, MA: Harvard University Asia Center distributed by Harvard University Press. ISBN 0674002490.
- —— (2012). Chinese History: A New Manual, 3rd edition. Cambridge, MA: Harvard University Asia Center distributed by Harvard University Press. ISBN 9780674067158.
- —— (2015). Chinese History: A New Manual, 4th edition. Cambridge, MA: Harvard University Asia Center distributed by Harvard University Press. ISBN 9780674088467.
- —— (2016). 中国历史研究手册. Beijing: Peking University Press. ISBN 9787301263938. 3 vols.
- —— (2018). Chinese History: A New Manual, 5th edition. Cambridge, MA. ISBN 9780998888309.
- —— (2019). Studies in Chinese Price History. Abingdon, OXON and New York, NY: Routledge. ISBN 9781138311596. 2nd edition.
- —— (2022). Chinese History: A New Manual, 6th (50th anniversary) edition. Cambridge, MA: Harvard University Asia Center distributed by Harvard University Press. ISBN 9780674260238. 2 vols.
- —— (2025). Chinese History: A New Manual, 7th edition (EBOOK). Wilton CT: Pleco Software. ISBN 9780998888323.

== Speeches and articles ==
Wilkinson has delivered more than 300 speeches on East and Southeast Asian current affairs at the UN and other international fora. In addition, he has also lectured at many universities. Since 2001 he has preferred to incorporate his research results into his book Chinese History: A New Manual rather than publish them separately. A few exceptions are shown below.

=== Selected articles and chapters on China ===
- —— (2001). "China Twenty Years from Now". Ostasiatischer Verein Bremen E.V.: 100 Jahre; 1901–2001. Bremen: OAV Bremen: 21–33.
- —— (2001). "Sources of Chinese Tradition (Review)". China Review International. 8 (1): 93–101. doi:10.1353/cri.2001.0052. S2CID 146428292.
- —— (2001). "Chinese Culinary History (Feature Review)". China Review International. 8 (2): 285–302. doi:10.1353/cri.2001.0110. S2CID 144337733.
- —— (2006). "The Number of Books Published and the Size of Library Collections in China and the West before 1900". Zhongguo Dianji Yu Wenhua (in Chinese). 59. Beijing: Peking University: 43–47.
- —— (2017). "How Do We Know What We Know about Chinese History?". In Szonyi, Michael (ed.). A Companion to Chinese History. Wiley-Blackwell Companions to World History. Wiley-Blackwell. pp. 11–27. ISBN 978-1-118-62460-9.
