= Harvard University Asia Center =

Interdisciplinary research and education unit of Harvard University

The Harvard University Asia Center is an interdisciplinary research and education unit of Harvard University, established on July 1, 1997, with the goal of "driving varied programs focusing on international relations in Asia and comparative studies of Asian countries and regions (...) and supplementing other Asia-related programs and institutes and the University and providing a focal point for interaction and exchange on topics of common interest for the Harvard community and Asian intellectual, political, and business circles," according to its charter.

The Asia Center facilitates the scholarly study of Asian studies by coordinating activities which are spread across the University's departments and schools, and by integrating many disciplines. Among the areas which are covered are history, culture, economics, politics, diplomacy, security, and its relationships. Thus, the main emphasis of the Asia Center rests on human and social sciences, with the principal involvement of the Faculty of Arts and Sciences.

== Publications ==
The Center has an active Publications Program, which features three series: the Harvard East Asian Monographs, initiated in 1956, with a total of approximately 400 titles by the end of 2015, the Harvard–Yenching Institute Monograph Series, with more than 100 titles, and the Harvard Contemporary China Series, with 18 titles. Publications are distributed through Harvard University Press.

== Staff ==
The Harvard University Asia Center is directed by Professor Karen Thornber, Victor and William Fung Director, Professor of East Asian Languages and Civilizations and of Comparative Literature, and Chair of the Harvard Asia Center Council. Preceding Professor Thornber as Director were Professor Ezra Vogel (1997-1999), Professor William C. Kirby (1999-2002), Professor Dwight H. Perkins (2002-2005), Professor Tony Saich (2005-2008), and Professor Arthur Kleinman (2008-2016), as well as two Acting Directors: Professor Michael Puett and Professor Andrew Gordon.
