= Högberg =

Högberg is a Swedish surname. Notable people with the surname include:

- Elisabeth Högberg (born 1986), Swedish biathlete
- Emil Högberg (born 1976), Swedish politician
- Folke Högberg (1884–1972), Swedish Army lieutenant general
- Fredrik Högberg (born 1971), Swedish composer and producer
- Göran Högberg (1948–2019), Swedish runner
- Jeanna Högberg (born 1982), Swedish dressage rider
- Lars Erik Högberg (1858–1924), Swedish Christian missionary
- Linus Högberg (born 1998), Swedish ice hockey player
- Marcus Högberg (born 1994), Swedish ice hockey player
- Mathilda Högberg (born 1994), Swedish social media influencer
- Mikael Högberg (born 1960), Swedish golfer
- Paul Högberg (1911–1999), Swedish sports administrator
- Ulf Högberg (1946–2023), Swedish runner
