= Bibliography of East Turkestan and the Uyghurs =

List of works on the Uyghurs and East Turkestan

Bibliography of the Uyghurs and East Turkestan
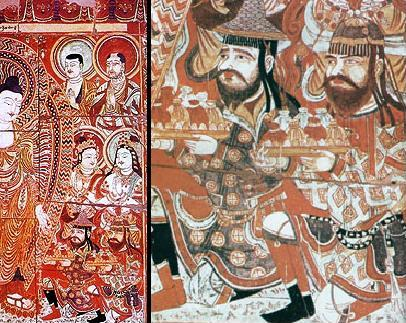
- Sogdian donors to the Buddha, mural from the Bezeklik Thousand Buddha Caves
- Subject: Uyghurs; East Turkestan; History of Xinjiang
- Scope: Books, journal articles, primary sources
- Period covered: 8th century – present
- Languages: English
- Related: Bibliography of Central Asian history; Bibliography of Chinese history; Bibliographies of the People's Republic of China

This is a Bibliography of the Uyghurs and East Turkestan.

East Turkestan or East Turkistan (Uyghur: شەرقىي تۈركىستان, ULY: Sherqiy Türkistan, UKY: Шәрқий Туркистан) is a loosely defined geographical region in the northwestern part of the People's Republic of China, on the cross roads of East and Central Asia. The term was coined in the 19th century by Russian Turkologists, including Nikita Bichurin, who intended the name to replace the common Western term for the region, "Chinese Turkestan", which referred to the Tarim Basin in Southern Xinjiang. Beginning in the 17th century, Altishahr, which means "Six Cities" in Uyghur, became the Uyghur name for the Tarim Basin. Uyghurs also called the Tarim Basin "Yettishar," which means "Seven Cities," and even "Sekkizshahr", which means "Eight Cities" in Uyghur. Chinese dynasties from the Han dynasty to the Tang dynasty had called an overlapping area the "Western Regions".

The Uyghurs, (Note: Uyghur: ئۇيغۇرلار, Уйғурлар, Uyghurlar, Uyghur pronunciation: [ujɣurˈlɑr]; simplified Chinese: 维吾尔; traditional Chinese: 維吾爾; pinyin: Wéiwú'ěr, IPA: [wěɪ.ǔ.àɚ]; For the English pronunciation, see Etymology) alternatively spelled Uighurs, Uygurs, or Uigurs, are a Turkic ethnic group originating from and culturally affiliated with the general region of Central Asia and East Asia. They speak Uyghur, a Karluk language that shares the same origin with Uzbek. The Uyghurs are recognized as the titular nationality of the Xinjiang Uyghur Autonomous Region in Northwest China. They are one of China's 55 officially recognized ethnic minorities.

This bibliography contains academic-level English-language books (including translations) and journal articles. Book entries may have references to reviews published in academic journals or major newspapers when these could be considered helpful. These reference reviews also function as a resource to find other works on this subject.

Works listed here are cited in the notes or bibliographies of scholarly sources. Each is published by an academic or major trade press, written by a recognized expert, or substantially reviewed in scholarly journals; borderline cases are omitted. A selection of primary sources is included. Many of the books below carry their own bibliographies; see Further reading section for longer ones, and External links section for historical sites and museums.

Citations follow APA style. (Note: Entries are in plain text APA 7 format without templates; templates are used only for reviews and notes.) Books have citations to academic journal or mainstream published reviews when available. For books only partly about the subject, relevant chapter or section titles are given where useful and available. Translators of the original-language edition are included when possible. In cases where a title or name has appeared with more than one English spelling, the most recent published form is used and a footnote documents any earlier title under which the work appeared.

== General works ==
- Baranovitch, N. (2010). Others no more: The changing representation of non-Han peoples in Chinese history textbooks, 1951–2003. The Journal of Asian Studies, 69(1), 85–122. doi:10.1017/s0021911809991598
- Bellér-Hann, I., Schlyter, B. N., & Sugawara, J. (Eds.). (2017). Kashgar revisited: Uyghur studies in memory of Ambassador Gunnar Jarring. Brill. doi:10.1163/9789004330078
- Chen, Y.-W. (2012). 'Xinjiang 13' revisited. Asian Ethnicity, 13(1), 111–113. doi:10.1080/14631369.2012.649612
- Dillon, M. (2003). Xinjiang: China's Muslim far northwest. RoutledgeCurzon. doi:10.4324/9780203166642
- Kamalov, A. (2021b). Uyghur historiography. In Oxford research encyclopedia of Asian history. Oxford University Press. doi:10.1093/acrefore/9780190277727.013.637
- Mackerras, C., & Clarke, M. (Eds.). (2009). China, Xinjiang and Central Asia: History, transition and crossborder interaction into the 21st century. Routledge. doi:10.4324/9780203881705
- Millward, J. A. (2018). Four recent books on Xinjiang and Uyghur history. Harvard Journal of Asiatic Studies, 78(2), 515–546. doi:10.1353/jas.2018.0032
- Millward, J. A. (2021). Eurasian crossroads: A history of Xinjiang (Rev. and updated ed.). Columbia University Press. doi:10.7312/mill20454
- Rossabi, M. (2022). China and the Uyghurs: A concise introduction. Rowman & Littlefield. doi:10.5771/9781538162996
- Soucek, S. (2000). A history of Inner Asia. Cambridge University Press. doi:10.1017/cbo9780511991523
- Starr, S. F. (Ed.). (2004). Xinjiang: China's Muslim borderland. M. E. Sharpe.
- Thum, R. (2018). The Uyghurs in modern China. In Oxford research encyclopedia of Asian history. Oxford University Press. doi:10.1093/acrefore/9780190277727.013.160

== Before 1759 ==
=== Ancient Tarim Basin ===
- Brough, J. (1965). Comments on third-century Shan-shan and the history of Buddhism. Bulletin of the School of Oriental and African Studies, 28(3), 582–612. doi:10.1017/s0041977x00071469
- Duan, Q., & Wang, H. (2013). Were textiles used as money in Khotan in the seventh and eighth centuries? Journal of the Royal Asiatic Society, 23(2), 307–325. doi:10.1017/s1356186313000217
- Hansen, V. (2004). Religious life in a Silk Road community: Niya during the third and fourth centuries. In J. Lagerwey (Ed.), Religion and Chinese society (pp. 279–316). Chinese University of Hong Kong Press. JSTOR j.ctv1z7kkfn.11
- Howard, A. F., & Vignato, G. (2015). Archaeological and visual sources of meditation in the ancient monasteries of Kuča. Brill. doi:10.1163/9789004279391
- Mair, V. H. (Ed.). (1998). The Bronze Age and Early Iron Age peoples of eastern Central Asia (Vols. 1–2). Institute for the Study of Man; University of Pennsylvania Museum Publications.
- Mallory, J. P., & Mair, V. H. (2000). The Tarim mummies: Ancient China and the mystery of the earliest peoples from the West. Thames & Hudson.
- Peyrot, M. (2008). Variation and change in Tocharian B. Rodopi. doi:10.1163/9789004358218
- Schoubben, N. (2026). Traces of language contact in Niya Prakrit: Bactrian and other foreign elements. Harrassowitz. doi:10.13173/9783447125727
- Zhang, F., Ning, C., Scott, A., Fu, Q., Bjørn, R., Li, W., Wei, D., Wang, W., Fan, L., Abuduresule, I., Hu, X., Ruan, Q., Niyazi, A., Dong, G., Cao, P., Liu, F., Dai, Q., Feng, X., Yang, R., . . . Cui, Y. (2021). The genomic origins of the Bronze Age Tarim Basin mummies. Nature, 599(7884), 256–261. doi:10.1038/s41586-021-04052-7

=== Uyghur Khaganate and Qocho ===
- Beckwith, C. I. (1987). The Tibetan empire in Central Asia: A history of the struggle for great power among Tibetans, Turks, Arabs, and Chinese during the early Middle Ages. Princeton University Press. doi:10.1515/9780691216300
- Brose, M. C. (2005). Uyghur technologists of writing and literacy in Mongol China. T'oung Pao, 91(4), 396–435. doi:10.1163/156853205774910106
- Brose, M. C. (2007). Subjects and masters: Uyghurs in the Mongol Empire. Center for East Asian Studies, Western Washington University.
- Drompp, M. R. (2005). Tang China and the collapse of the Uighur Empire: A documentary history. Brill. doi:10.1163/9789047414780
- Ma, F. (2026). The West Uighur Kingdom on the Silk Road: A history of eastern Central Asia from the ninth to the thirteenth centuries. Routledge. doi:10.4324/9781003751694
- Mackerras, C. (1972). The Uighur Empire according to the T'ang dynastic histories: A study in Sino-Uighur relations 744–840 (2nd ed.). Australian National University Press.
- Rogers, J. D., Ulambayar, E., & Gallon, M. (2005). Urban centres and the emergence of empires in Eastern Inner Asia. Antiquity, 79(306), 801–818. doi:10.1017/s0003598x00114942
- Rong, X. (2000). The relationship of Dunhuang with the Uighur kingdom in Turfan in the tenth century. In P. Zieme & L. Bazin (Eds.), De Dunhuang à Istanbul: Hommage à James Russell Hamilton (pp. 275–298). Brepols. doi:10.1484/M.SRS-EB.4.00105
- Russell-Smith, L. (2003). Wives and patrons: Uygur political and artistic influence in tenth-century Dunhuang. Acta Orientalia Academiae Scientiarum Hungaricae, 56(2–4), 401–428. doi:10.1556/aorient.56.2003.2-4.20
- Russell-Smith, L. (2005). Uygur patronage in Dunhuang: Regional art centres on the Northern Silk Road in the tenth and eleventh centuries. Brill. doi:10.1163/9789047415695
- Skaff, J. K. (2012). Sui-Tang China and its Turko-Mongol neighbors: Culture, power, and connections, 580–800. Oxford University Press. doi:10.1093/acprof:oso/9780199734139.001.0001
- Zhang, T., & Zieme, P. (2011). A memorandum about the king of the On Uygur and his realm. Acta Orientalia Academiae Scientiarum Hungaricae, 64(2), 129–159. doi:10.1556/AOrient.64.2011.2.2
- Zieme, P. (2009). Ordo Uluš, Solmi and Bešbalik. Acta Orientalia Academiae Scientiarum Hungaricae, 62(3), 255–266. doi:10.1556/AOrient.62.2009.3.1

=== Buddhism and Manichaeism ===
- Elverskog, J. (1997). Uygur Buddhist literature. Brepols. doi:10.1484/m.srs-eb.5.112509
- Elverskog, J. (2024). A history of Uyghur Buddhism. Columbia University Press. doi:10.7312/elve21524
- Gulácsi, Z. (2005). Mediaeval Manichaean book art: A codicological study of Iranian and Turkic illuminated book fragments from 8th–11th century East Central Asia. Brill. doi:10.1163/9789047405962
- Gulácsi, Z. (2015). Mani's pictures: The didactic images of the Manichaeans from Sasanian Mesopotamia to Uygur Central Asia and Tang-Ming China. Brill. doi:10.1163/9789004308947
- Konczak-Nagel, I., & Zin, M. (2020). Essays and studies in the art of Kucha. Dev Publishers.
- Meinert, C., & Sørensen, H. H. (Eds.). (2020). Buddhism in Central Asia I: Patronage, legitimation, sacred space, and pilgrimage. Brill. doi:10.1163/9789004417731
- Moriyasu, T. (2015). New developments in the history of East Uighur Manichaeism. Open Theology, 1(1). doi:10.1515/opth-2015-0016
- Vignato, G., & Hiyama, S. (2022). Traces of the Sarvāstivādins in the Buddhist monasteries of Kucha. Dev Publishers.
- Zieme, P. (Ed.). (2008). Aspects of research into Central Asian Buddhism: In memoriam Kōgi Kudara. Brepols.

=== Islamic khanates and the Zunghars ===
- Biran, M. (2002). The Chaghadaids and Islam: The conversion of Tarmashirin Khan (1331–34). Journal of the American Oriental Society, 122(4), 742–752. JSTOR 3217613
- Biran, M. (2005). The empire of the Qara Khitai in Eurasian history: Between China and the Islamic world. Cambridge University Press.
- Di Cosmo, N., Frank, A. J., & Golden, P. B. (Eds.). (2009). The Cambridge history of Inner Asia: The Chinggisid age. Cambridge University Press.
- Duturaeva, D. (2018). Qarakhanid envoys to Song China. Journal of Asian History, 52(2). doi:10.13173/jasiahist.52.2.0179
- Eden, J. (2015). A Sufi saint in sixteenth-century East Turkistan: New evidence concerning the life of Khwāja Isḥāq. Journal of the Royal Asiatic Society, 25(2), 229–245. doi:10.1017/S135618631400056X
- Fletcher, J. F. (1995). Studies on Chinese and Islamic Inner Asia. Variorum.
- Kim, H. (1999). The early history of the Moghul nomads: The legacy of the Chaghatai Khanate. In R. Amitai-Preiss & D. O. Morgan (Eds.), The Mongol Empire and its legacy (pp. 290–318). Brill. doi:10.1163/9789004492738_021
- Kościelniak, K. (2018). The Afaq (Apak) Khoja mausoleum in Kashgar as a symbol of Uyghur's identity (ca 1640–2015). Analecta Cracoviensia, 49, 249–281. doi:10.15633/acr.2415
- Onuma, T. (2011). The development of the Junghars and the role of Bukharan merchants. Journal of Central Eurasian Studies, 2, 83–100.
- Perdue, P. C. (2017). The expansion of the Qing dynasty of China and the Zunghar Mongol state. In Oxford research encyclopedia of Asian history. Oxford University Press. doi:10.1093/acrefore/9780190277727.013.7

=== Silk Road ===
- Beckwith, C. I. (2009). Empires of the Silk Road: A history of Central Eurasia from the Bronze Age to the present. Princeton University Press. doi:10.1515/9781400829941
- de la Vaissière, É. (2005). Sogdian traders: A history (J. Ward, Trans.). Brill. doi:10.1163/9789047406990
- Elverskog, J. (2010). Buddhism and Islam on the Silk Road. University of Pennsylvania Press. doi:10.9783/9780812205312
- Golden, P. B. (1992). An introduction to the history of the Turkic peoples: Ethnogenesis and state-formation in medieval and early modern Eurasia and the Middle East. Harrassowitz.
- Golden, P. B. (2011). Central Asia in world history. Oxford University Press.
- Hansen, V. (2012). The Silk Road: A new history. Oxford University Press.
- Sinor, D. (Ed.). (1990). The Cambridge history of early Inner Asia. Cambridge University Press. doi:10.1017/chol9780521243049

== Qing period, 1759–1911 ==
- Bellér-Hann, I. (2008). Community matters in Xinjiang 1880–1949: Towards a historical anthropology of the Uyghur. Brill. doi:10.1163/ej.9789004166752.i-477
- Brophy, D. (2013). The Junghar Mongol legacy and the language of loyalty in Qing Xinjiang. Harvard Journal of Asiatic Studies, 73(2), 231–258. doi:10.1353/jas.2013.0017
- Brophy, D. (2016a). New methods on the new frontier: Islamic reformism in Xinjiang, 1898–1917. Journal of the Economic and Social History of the Orient, 59(1–2), 303–332. doi:10.1163/15685209-12341400
- Chu, W.-D. (1966). The Moslem rebellion in northwest China, 1862–1878: A study of government minority policy. Mouton. doi:10.1515/9783111414508
- Fletcher, J. (1978a). Ch'ing Inner Asia c. 1800. In J. K. Fairbank (Ed.), The Cambridge history of China: Vol. 10. Late Ch'ing, 1800–1911, Part 1 (pp. 35–106). Cambridge University Press. doi:10.1017/CHOL9780521214476.003
- Fletcher, J. (1978b). The heyday of the Ch'ing order in Mongolia, Sinkiang and Tibet. In J. K. Fairbank (Ed.), The Cambridge history of China: Vol. 10. Late Ch'ing, 1800–1911, Part 1 (pp. 351–408). Cambridge University Press. doi:10.1017/CHOL9780521214476.009
- Hsü, I. C. Y. (1965). The Ili crisis: A study of Sino-Russian diplomacy, 1871–1881. Clarendon Press.
- Kim, H. (2004). Holy war in China: The Muslim rebellion and state in Chinese Central Asia, 1864–1877. Stanford University Press. doi:10.1515/9780804767231
- Kim, K. (2012). Profit and protection: Emin Khwaja and the Qing conquest of Central Asia, 1759–1777. The Journal of Asian Studies, 71(3), 603–626. doi:10.1017/S0021911812000654
- Kim, K. (2016). Borderland capitalism: Turkestan produce, Qing silver, and the birth of an Eastern market. Stanford University Press. doi:10.11126/stanford/9780804799232.001.0001
- Lavelle, P. B. (2020). The profits of nature: Colonial development and the quest for resources in nineteenth-century China. Columbia University Press. doi:10.7312/lave19470
- Millward, J. A. (1998). Beyond the pass: Economy, ethnicity, and empire in Qing Central Asia, 1759–1864. Stanford University Press. doi:10.1515/9780804797924
- Mosca, M. W. (2013). From frontier policy to foreign policy: The question of India and the transformation of geopolitics in Qing China. Stanford University Press. doi:10.1515/9780804785389
- Newby, L. J. (1999). The Chinese literary conquest of Xinjiang. Modern China, 25(4), 451–474. doi:10.1177/009770049902500403
- Newby, L. J. (2005). The empire and the khanate: A political history of Qing relations with Khoqand c. 1760–1860. Brill. doi:10.1163/9789047415336
- Perdue, P. C. (2005). China marches west: The Qing conquest of Central Eurasia. Harvard University Press. doi:10.4159/9780674042025
- Schluessel, E. (2020). Land of strangers: The civilizing project in Qing Central Asia. Columbia University Press. doi:10.7312/schl19754
- Skrine, C. P., & Nightingale, P. (1973). Macartney at Kashgar: New light on British, Chinese and Russian activities in Sinkiang, 1890–1918. Methuen.

== Republican era, 1912–1949 ==
- Benson, L. (1990). The Ili rebellion: The Moslem challenge to Chinese authority in Xinjiang, 1944–1949. M. E. Sharpe.
- Brophy, D. (2016b). Uyghur nation: Reform and revolution on the Russia-China frontier. Harvard University Press. doi:10.4159/9780674970441
- De Cordier, B. (2016). International aid, frontier securitization, and social engineering: Soviet–Xinjiang development cooperation during the governorate of Sheng Shicai (1933–1944). Central Asian Affairs, 3(1), 49–76. doi:10.1163/22142290-00301003
- Dillon, M. (2014). Xinjiang and the expansion of Chinese Communist power: Kashgar in the early twentieth century. Routledge. doi:10.4324/9781315762111
- Forbes, A. D. W. (1986). Warlords and Muslims in Chinese Central Asia: A political history of Republican Sinkiang 1911–1949. Cambridge University Press.
- Jacobs, J. M. (2014). Nationalist China's "Great Game": Leveraging foreign explorers in Xinjiang, 1927–1935. The Journal of Asian Studies, 73(1), 43–64. doi:10.1017/s0021911813001721
- Jacobs, J. M. (2016). Xinjiang and the modern Chinese state. University of Washington Press. doi:10.1515/9780295806570
- Jacobs, J. M. (2020). The compensations of plunder: How China lost its treasures. University of Chicago Press. doi:10.7208/chicago/9780226712154.001.0001
- Klimeš, O. (2015). Struggle by the pen: The Uyghur discourse of nation and national interest, c. 1900–1949. Brill. doi:10.1163/9789004288096
- Lattimore, O. (1950). Pivot of Asia: Sinkiang and the Inner Asian frontiers of China and Russia. Little, Brown.
- Lin, H.-T. (2010). Modern China's ethnic frontiers: A journey to the west. Routledge. doi:10.4324/9780203844977
- Wang, D. (1997). The Xinjiang question of the 1940s: The story behind the Sino-Soviet treaty of August 1945. Asian Studies Review, 21(1), 83–105. doi:10.1080/03147539708713142
- Wang, D. D. (1999). Under the Soviet shadow. The Yining Incident: Ethnic conflicts and international rivalry in Xinjiang, 1944–1949. Chinese University Press.
- Wang, K. (2018). The East Turkestan independence movement, 1930s to 1940s (C. Fletcher, Trans.). Chinese University of Hong Kong Press. doi:10.1353/book65145
- Whiting, A. S., & Sheng, S. (1958). Sinkiang: Pawn or pivot? Michigan State University Press.

== People's Republic ==
=== Mao era, 1949–1976 ===
- Dreyer, J. T. (1968). China's minority nationalities in the Cultural Revolution. The China Quarterly, 35, 96–109. doi:10.1017/s0305741000032124
- Dreyer, J. T. (1976). China's forty millions: Minority nationalities and national integration in the People's Republic of China. Harvard University Press.
- Kraus, C. (2010). Creating a Soviet "semi-colony"? Sino-Soviet cooperation and its demise in Xinjiang, 1949–1955. The Chinese Historical Review, 17(2), 129–165. doi:10.1179/tcr.2010.17.2.129
- Kraus, C. (2019). Laying blame for flight and fight: Sino-Soviet relations and the "Yi–Ta" incident in Xinjiang, 1962. The China Quarterly, 238, 504–523. doi:10.1017/s0305741018001789
- Mao, S. (2018). More than a famine: Mass exodus of 1962 in northwest Xinjiang. China Review, 18(2), 155–183.
- McMillen, D. H. (1984). Xinjiang and Wang Enmao: New directions in power, policy and integration? The China Quarterly, 99, 569–593. doi:10.1017/s0305741000017185
- Moseley, G. (1966). A Sino-Soviet cultural frontier: The Ili Kazakh Autonomous Chou. East Asian Research Center, Harvard University. JSTOR j.ctt1tg5n34
- Pianciola, N. (2016). Towards a transnational history of Great Leaps Forward in pastoral Central Eurasia. East/West: Journal of Ukrainian Studies, 3(2), 75–116. doi:10.21226/T2XW2F

=== Governance and ethnic policy ===
- Bovingdon, G. (2002). The not-so-silent majority. Modern China, 28(1), 39–78. doi:10.1177/009770040202800102
- Bovingdon, G. (2004). Autonomy in Xinjiang: Han nationalist imperatives and Uyghur discontent (Policy Studies No. 11). East-West Center Washington.
- Bovingdon, G. (2010). The Uyghurs: Strangers in their own land. Columbia University Press.
- Dreyer, J. T. (1986). The Xinjiang Uygur Autonomous Region at thirty: A report card. Asian Survey, 26(7), 721–744. JSTOR 2644208
- Han, E. (2013). Contestation and adaptation: The politics of national identity in China. Oxford University Press. doi:10.1093/acprof:oso/9780199936298.001.0001
- Hayes, A., & Clarke, M. E. (Eds.). (2015). Inside Xinjiang: Space, place and power in China's Muslim far northwest. Routledge. doi:10.4324/9781315770475
- McMillen, D. H. (1979). Chinese Communist power and policy in Xinjiang, 1949–1977. Westview Press.

=== Economy, natural resources, infrastructure ===
- Baranovitch, N. (2019). The impact of environmental pollution on ethnic unrest in Xinjiang: A Uyghur perspective. Modern China, 45(5), 504–536. doi:10.1177/0097700418819090
- Becquelin, N. (2004). Staged development in Xinjiang. The China Quarterly, 178, 358–378. doi:10.1017/s0305741004000219
- Cappelletti, A. (2020). Socio-economic development in Xinjiang Uyghur Autonomous Region: Disparities and power struggle in China's north-west. Palgrave Macmillan. doi:10.1007/978-981-15-1536-1
- Cliff, T. (2013). Peripheral urbanism: Making history on China's northwest frontier. China Perspectives, 2013(3), 13–23. doi:10.4000/chinaperspectives.6249
- Hayes, A. (2020). Interwoven 'destinies': The significance of Xinjiang to the China Dream, the Belt and Road Initiative, and the Xi Jinping legacy. Journal of Contemporary China, 29(121), 31–45. doi:10.1080/10670564.2019.1621528
- Kinzley, J. C. (2018). Natural resources and the new frontier: Constructing modern China's borderlands. University of Chicago Press.
- Rippa, A. (2020). Borderland infrastructures: Trade, development, and control in western China. Amsterdam University Press. JSTOR j.ctv15vwk9b
- Steenberg, R., & Rippa, A. (2019). Development for all? State schemes, security, and marginalization in Kashgar, Xinjiang. Critical Asian Studies, 51(2), 274–295. doi:10.1080/14672715.2019.1575758
- Thevs, N. (2011). Water scarcity and allocation in the Tarim Basin: Decision structures and adaptations on the local level. Journal of Current Chinese Affairs, 40(3), 113–137. doi:10.1177/186810261104000305
- Wu, X., & Song, X. (2014). Ethnic stratification amid China's economic transition: Evidence from the Xinjiang Uyghur Autonomous Region. Social Science Research, 44, 158–172. doi:10.1016/j.ssresearch.2013.12.002
- Zukosky, M. L. (2012). Quality, development discourse, and minority subjectivity in contemporary Xinjiang. Modern China, 38(2), 233–264. doi:10.1177/0097700411410530

=== Settler colonialism ===
- Anand, D. (2019). Colonization with Chinese characteristics: Politics of (in)security in Xinjiang and Tibet. Central Asian Survey, 38(1), 129–147. doi:10.1080/02634937.2018.1534801
- Clarke, M. (2021). Settler colonialism and the path toward cultural genocide in Xinjiang. Global Responsibility to Protect, 13(1), 9–19. doi:10.1163/1875-984x-13010002
- Cliff, T. (2016). Oil and water: Being Han in Xinjiang. University of Chicago Press. doi:10.7208/chicago/9780226360270.001.0001
- Cliff, T. (2021). Refugees, conscripts, and constructors: Developmental narratives and subaltern Han in Xinjiang, China. Modern China, 47(5), 540–568. doi:10.1177/0097700420904020
- Cliff, T. M. J. (2009). Neo oasis: The Xinjiang bingtuan in the twenty-first century. Asian Studies Review, 33(1), 83–106. doi:10.1080/10357820802714807
- McMillen, D. H. (1981). Xinjiang and the Production and Construction Corps: A Han organisation in a non-Han region. The Australian Journal of Chinese Affairs, 6, 65–96. JSTOR 2159052
- Sautman, B. (2000). Is Xinjiang an internal colony? Inner Asia, 2(2), 239–271. doi:10.1163/146481700793647788
- Seymour, J. D. (2000). Xinjiang's Production and Construction Corps, and the sinification of Eastern Turkestan. Inner Asia, 2(2), 171–193. doi:10.1163/146481700793647805
- Smith Finley, J. (2022). Tabula rasa: Han settler colonialism and frontier genocide in "re-educated" Xinjiang. HAU: Journal of Ethnographic Theory, 12(2), 341–356. doi:10.1086/720902
- Zhu, Y., & Blachford, D. (2016). "Old bottle, new wine"? Xinjiang bingtuan and China's ethnic frontier governance. Journal of Contemporary China, 25(97), 25–40. doi:10.1080/10670564.2015.1060760

=== Foreign relations ===
- Aris, S. (2009). The Shanghai Cooperation Organisation: 'Tackling the three evils'. A regional response to non-traditional security challenges or an anti-Western bloc? Europe-Asia Studies, 61(3), 457–482. doi:10.1080/09668130902753309
- Clarke, M. (2003). Xinjiang and China's relations with Central Asia, 1991–2001: Across the 'domestic-foreign frontier'? Asian Ethnicity, 4(2), 207–224. doi:10.1080/14631360301653
- Clarke, M. (2015). China and the Uyghurs: The "Palestinization" of Xinjiang? Middle East Policy, 22(3), 127–146. doi:10.1111/mepo.12148
- Clarke, M. E. (2011). Xinjiang and China's rise in Central Asia: A history. Routledge. doi:10.4324/9780203831113
- Kerr, D., & Swinton, L. C. (2008). China, Xinjiang, and the transnational security of Central Asia. Critical Asian Studies, 40(1), 89–112. doi:10.1080/14672710801959174
- Laruelle, M., & Peyrouse, S. (2012). The Chinese question in Central Asia: Domestic order, social change, and the Chinese factor. Hurst.
- Pantucci, R., & Petersen, A. (2022). Sinostan: China's inadvertent empire. Oxford University Press.

== Other peoples of East Turkestan ==
=== Kazakhs ===
- Benson, L., & Svanberg, I. (1998). China's last nomads: The history and culture of China's Kazaks. M. E. Sharpe.
- Jacobs, J. (2010). The many deaths of a Kazak unaligned: Osman Batur, Chinese decolonization, and the nationalization of a nomad. The American Historical Review, 115(5), 1291–1314. doi:10.1086/ahr.115.5.1291
- Proń, E., & Szwajnoch, E. (2020). Kyrgyz and Kazakh responses to China's Xinjiang policy under Xi Jinping. Asian Affairs, 51(4), 761–778. doi:10.1080/03068374.2020.1827547
- Salimjan, G. (2020). Mapping loss, remembering ancestors: Genealogical narratives of Kazakhs in China. Asian Ethnicity, 22(1), 105–120. doi:10.1080/14631369.2020.1819772
- Salimjan, G. (2023). Ecotourism as racial capitalism: Ecological civilisation in settler-colonial Xinjiang. Inner Asia, 25(1), 91–110. doi:10.1163/22105018-02501008
- Shakhanova, G. (2025). Perspectives on Chinese soft power by Kazakh repatriates from China. Asian Studies Review, 49(4), 781–797. doi:10.1080/10357823.2025.2470867
- Zhang, Z., & Tsakhirmaa, S. (2022). Ethnonationalism and the changing pattern of ethnic Kazakhs' emigration from China to Kazakhstan. China Information, 36(3), 318–343. doi:10.1177/0920203x221092686

=== Other groups ===
- Bello, D. A. (2018). Cultivating Torghut Mongols in a semi-arid steppe. Journal of Chinese History, 2(2), 355–372. doi:10.1017/jch.2018.3
- Côté, I. (2015). The enemies within: Targeting Han Chinese and Hui minorities in Xinjiang. Asian Ethnicity, 16(2), 136–151. doi:10.1080/14631369.2015.1003688
- Friedrichs, J. (2017). Sino-Muslim relations: The Han, the Hui, and the Uyghurs. Journal of Muslim Minority Affairs, 37(1), 55–79. doi:10.1080/13602004.2017.1294373
- Kokaisl, P. (2012). Kyrgyz minorities in China. Inner Asia, 14(2), 383–402. doi:10.1163/22105018-90000011
- Kreutzmann, H. (2015). Pamirian crossroads: Kirghiz and Wakhi of High Asia. Harrassowitz. JSTOR j.ctvc76zjf
- Kuz'min, S. L. (2014). Reports on the Mongols of Xinjiang in the 1920s. Anthropology & Archeology of Eurasia, 53(4), 14–20. doi:10.1080/10611959.2014.1069687
- Long, M. D. R. (2020). Finding the 'Epic of Jangar': The literary construction of an early Oirat epic in the Xinjiang Uyghur Autonomous Region. Asian Ethnicity, 22(1), 90–104. doi:10.1080/14631369.2020.1793103
- Saidula, A. (2018). The Tajiks of China. In D. Dagiev & C. Faucher (Eds.), Identity, history and trans-nationality in Central Asia: The mountain communities of Pamir (pp. 61–75). Routledge. doi:10.4324/9781351124263-5
- Sárközi, I. G. (2018). From the mists of martyrdom: Sibe ancestors and heroes on the altar of Chinese nation-building. LIT Verlag. doi:10.52038/978-3643-90893-3

== Repression ==
- Bellér-Hann, I. (2021). From voice to silence: The shrinking space for Uyghur narratives of belonging in reform China. Asian Ethnicity, 22(1), 155–170. doi:10.1080/14631369.2020.1781532
- Byler, D. (2019). Preventative policing as community detention in northwest China. Made in China Journal, 4(3). doi:10.22459/mic.04.03.2019.13
- Byler, D. (2022b). Terror capitalism: Uyghur dispossession and masculinity in a Chinese city. Duke University Press. doi:10.1215/9781478022268
- Byler, D. (2022c). Producing "enemy intelligence": Information infrastructure and the smart city in Northwest China. Information & Culture, 57(2), 197–216. doi:10.7560/ic57205
- Byler, D. (2022d). The social life of terror capitalism technologies in Northwest China. Public Culture, 34(2), 167–193. doi:10.1215/08992363-9584694
- Byler, D. (2023). Digital turban-head: Racial learning and policing Muslims in Northwest China. PoLAR: Political and Legal Anthropology Review, 46(1), 121–127. doi:10.1111/plar.12513
- Chaudhuri, D. (2018). Xinjiang and the Chinese state: Violence in the reform era. Routledge India. doi:10.4324/9780203732168
- Clarke, M. (2008). China's "war on terror" in Xinjiang: Human security and the causes of violent Uighur separatism. Terrorism and Political Violence, 20(2), 271–301. doi:10.1080/09546550801920865
- Clarke, M. (2010). Widening the net: China's anti-terror laws and human rights in the Xinjiang Uyghur Autonomous Region. The International Journal of Human Rights, 14(4), 542–558. doi:10.1080/13642980802710855
- Clarke, M. (Ed.). (2018). Terrorism and counter-terrorism in China: Domestic and foreign policy dimensions. Oxford University Press. doi:10.1093/oso/9780190922610.001.0001
- Çölgeçen, A. E. (2026). Ungrievable lives: State and non-state authoritarianism in the making of Uyghur foreign fighters. Ethnicities. Advance online publication. doi:10.1177/14687968261494154
- Dillon, M. (2018). Xinjiang in the twenty-first century: Islam, ethnicity and resistance. Routledge. doi:10.4324/9781315749341
- Greitens, S. C., Lee, M., & Yazici, E. (2020). Counterterrorism and preventive repression: China's changing strategy in Xinjiang. International Security, 44(3), 9–47. doi:10.1162/isec_a_00368
- Kaltman, B. (2007). Under the heel of the dragon: Islam, racism, crime, and the Uighur in China. Ohio University Press.
- Kam, S. (2025). The evolution of grassroots governance in China: Home visits by work teams in Xinjiang. The China Quarterly, 264, 1054–1070. doi:10.1017/s0305741025101355
- Kam, S., & Clarke, M. (2021). Securitization, surveillance and 'de-extremization' in Xinjiang. International Affairs, 97(3), 625–642. doi:10.1093/ia/iiab038
- Klimeš, O. (2018). Advancing "ethnic unity" and "de-extremization": Ideational governance in Xinjiang under "new circumstances" (2012–2017). Journal of Chinese Political Science, 23(3), 413–436. doi:10.1007/s11366-018-9537-8
- Lakomy, M. (2023). Listening to the "Voice of Islam": The Turkestan Islamic Party's online propaganda strategy. Studies in Conflict & Terrorism, 46(11), 2241–2266. doi:10.1080/1057610X.2021.1914361
- Leibold, J. (2020). Surveillance in China's Xinjiang region: Ethnic sorting, coercion, and inducement. Journal of Contemporary China, 29(121), 46–60. doi:10.1080/10670564.2019.1621529
- Li, E. (2019). Fighting the "three evils": A structural analysis of counter-terrorism legal architecture in China. Emory International Law Review, 33(3), 311–365.
- Odgaard, L., & Nielsen, T. G. (2014). China's counterinsurgency strategy in Tibet and Xinjiang. Journal of Contemporary China, 23(87), 535–555. doi:10.1080/10670564.2013.843934
- Oztig, L. I., & Celil Karluk, A. (2025). China's high-tech repression against Uyghurs: Novel theoretical insights. Springer. doi:10.1007/978-3-031-82287-2
- Potter, P. B. K. (2013). Terrorism in China: Growing threats with global implications. Strategic Studies Quarterly, 7(4), 70–92.
- Potter, P. B. K., & Wang, C. (2022). Zero tolerance: Repression and political violence on China's new Silk Road. Cambridge University Press. doi:10.1017/9781009115247
- Qiang, X. (2019). The road to digital unfreedom: President Xi's surveillance state. Journal of Democracy, 30(1), 53–67. doi:10.1353/jod.2019.0004
- Reed, J. T., & Raschke, D. (2010). The ETIM: China's Islamic militants and the global terrorist threat. ABC-CLIO. doi:10.5040/9798400647949
- Roberts, S. R. (2018). The biopolitics of China's "war on terror" and the exclusion of the Uyghurs. Critical Asian Studies, 50(2), 232–258. doi:10.1080/14672715.2018.1454111
- Roberts, S. R. (2020). The war on the Uyghurs: China's internal campaign against a Muslim minority. Princeton University Press. doi:10.1515/9780691202211
- Roche, G., & Leibold, J. (2022). State racism and surveillance in Xinjiang (People's Republic of China). The Political Quarterly, 93(3), 442–450. doi:10.1111/1467-923x.13149
- Rodríguez-Merino, P. A. (2019). Old 'counter-revolution', new 'terrorism': Historicizing the framing of violence in Xinjiang by the Chinese state. Central Asian Survey, 38(1), 27–45. doi:10.1080/02634937.2018.1496066
- Rodríguez-Merino, P. A. (2022). Violence, discourse, and politics in China's Uyghur region: The terroristization of Xinjiang. Routledge. doi:10.4324/9781003308041
- Smith Finley, J. (2019a). Securitization, insecurity and conflict in contemporary Xinjiang: Has PRC counter-terrorism evolved into state terror? Central Asian Survey, 38(1), 1–26. doi:10.1080/02634937.2019.1586348
- Tobin, D. (2020). Securing China's northwest frontier: Identity and insecurity in Xinjiang. Cambridge University Press. doi:10.1017/9781108770408
- Trédaniel, M., & Lee, P. K. (2018). Explaining the Chinese framing of the "terrorist" violence in Xinjiang: Insights from securitization theory. Nationalities Papers, 46(1), 177–195. doi:10.1080/00905992.2017.1351427
- Tschantret, J. (2018). Repression, opportunity, and innovation: The evolution of terrorism in Xinjiang, China. Terrorism and Political Violence, 30(4), 569–588. doi:10.1080/09546553.2016.1182911
- Wayne, M. I. (2007). China's war on terrorism: Counter-insurgency, politics and internal security. Routledge. doi:10.4324/9780203936139
- Zenz, A., & Leibold, J. (2020). Securitizing Xinjiang: Police recruitment, informal policing and ethnic minority co-optation. The China Quarterly, 242, 324–348. doi:10.1017/s0305741019000778
- Zhou, Z. (2019). Chinese strategy for de-radicalization. Terrorism and Political Violence, 31(6), 1187–1209. doi:10.1080/09546553.2017.1330199

=== Unrest and protest ===
- Castets, R. (2003). The Uyghurs in Xinjiang – The malaise grows. China Perspectives, 49. doi:10.4000/chinaperspectives.648
- Chung, C.-P. (2018). China's Uyghur problem after the 2009 Ürümqi riot: Repression, recompense, readiness, resistance. Journal of Policing, Intelligence and Counter Terrorism, 13(2), 185–201. doi:10.1080/18335330.2018.1475746
- Cliff, T. (2012). The partnership of stability in Xinjiang: State–society interactions following the July 2009 unrest. The China Journal, 68, 79–105. doi:10.1086/666581
- Guan, Y., Guang, L., Li, L., & Liu, Y. (2025). The rally effect of the COVID-19 pandemic and the White Paper Movement in China. Journal of Contemporary China, 34(151), 117–128. doi:10.1080/10670564.2024.2356863
- Hastings, J. V. (2011). Charting the course of Uyghur unrest. The China Quarterly, 208, 893–912. doi:10.1017/s0305741011001056
- Hierman, B. (2007). The pacification of Xinjiang: Uighur protest and the Chinese state, 1988–2002. Problems of Post-Communism, 54(3), 48–62. doi:10.2753/ppc1075-8216540304
- Hillman, B., & Tuttle, G. (Eds.). (2016). Ethnic conflict and protest in Tibet and Xinjiang: Unrest in China's west. Columbia University Press. doi:10.7312/columbia/9780231169981.001.0001
- Liu, J. (2025). Disposable counterpublics: Women, queers, and Uyghurs in the White Paper Movement. International Journal of Cultural Studies, 28(6), 1041–1061. doi:10.1177/13678779251323925
- Mackerras, C. (2001). Xinjiang at the turn of the century: The causes of separatism. Central Asian Survey, 20(3), 289–303. doi:10.1080/02634930120095321
- Millward, J. A. (2004). Violent separatism in Xinjiang: A critical assessment. East-West Center Washington.
- Millward, J. A. (2009). Introduction: Does the 2009 Urumchi violence mark a turning point? Central Asian Survey, 28(4), 347–360. doi:10.1080/02634930903577128
- Shichor, Y. (2005). Blow up: Internal and external challenges of Uyghur separatism and Islamic radicalism to Chinese rule in Xinjiang. Asian Affairs: An American Review, 32(2), 119–136. doi:10.3200/aafs.32.2.119-136

=== Boarding schools ===
- Chen, Y. (2008). Muslim Uyghur students in a Chinese boarding school: Social recapitalization as a response to ethnic integration. Lexington Books. doi:10.5771/9781461633846
- Grose, T. (2015). (Re)embracing Islam in neidi: The 'Xinjiang class' and the dynamics of Uyghur ethno-national identity. Journal of Contemporary China, 24(91), 101–118. doi:10.1080/10670564.2014.918408
- Grose, T. (2019). Negotiating inseparability in China: The Xinjiang class and the dynamics of Uyghur identity. Hong Kong University Press. doi:10.5790/hongkong/9789888528097.001.0001
- Grose, T. A. (2010). The Xinjiang class: Education, integration, and the Uyghurs. Journal of Muslim Minority Affairs, 30(1), 97–109. doi:10.1080/13602001003650648
- Leibold, J. (2019). Interior ethnic minority boarding schools: China's bold and unpredictable educational experiment. Asian Studies Review, 43(1), 3–15. doi:10.1080/10357823.2018.1548572
- Leibold, J., & Grose, T. A. (2019). Cultural and political disciplining inside China's dislocated minority schooling system. Asian Studies Review, 43(1), 16–35. doi:10.1080/10357823.2018.1548571

=== Camps and prisons ===
- Anonymous. (2024). Rahile Dawut: A lifetime passion that ended with a life sentence. Made in China Journal, 9(1). doi:10.22459/mic.09.01.2024.01
- Byler, D. (2018b). Violent paternalism: On the banality of Uyghur unfreedom. The Asia-Pacific Journal: Japan Focus, 16(24). doi:10.1017/s1557466018014900
- Byler, D. (2021). In the camps: China's high-tech penal colony. Columbia Global Reports.
- Byler, D., Franceschini, I., & Loubere, N. (Eds.). (2022). Xinjiang year zero. ANU Press. doi:10.22459/xyz.2021
- Byler, D. (2025). The smart camp as classroom: Control, education, and agency in Muslim internment in Northwest China. International Journal of Comparative Sociology, 66(3), 420–439. doi:10.1177/00207152241279297
- Çaksu, A. (2020). Islamophobia, Chinese style: Total internment of Uyghur Muslims by the People's Republic of China. Islamophobia Studies Journal, 5(2). doi:10.13169/islastudj.5.2.0175
- Clarke, M. (Ed.). (2022). The Xinjiang emergency: Exploring the causes and consequences of China's mass detention of Uyghurs. Manchester University Press. doi:10.7765/9781526153128
- Cribb, R., Twomey, C., & Wilson, S. (Eds.). (2022). Detention camps in Asia: The conditions of confinement in modern Asian history. Brill. doi:10.1163/9789004512573
- Forth, A. (2017). Barbed-wire imperialism: Britain's empire of camps, 1876–1903. University of California Press. doi:10.1525/california/9780520293960.001.0001
- Mahmut, D. (2023). Anti-religious education or preventing religious extremism? An examination of the re-education camps in the Uyghur region of China. In Z. Gross (Ed.), Reimagining the landscape of religious education: Challenges and opportunities (pp. 125–145). Springer. doi:10.1007/978-3-031-20133-2_8
- Mühlhahn, K. (2009). Criminal justice in China: A history. Harvard University Press. doi:10.4159/9780674054332
- Raza, Z. (2019). China's 'political re-education' camps of Xinjiang's Uyghur Muslims. Asian Affairs, 50(4), 488–501. doi:10.1080/03068374.2019.1672433
- Rippa, A., & Steenberg, R. (2024). From behind black bars: Productive redactions and mass incarceration in Xinjiang Uyghur Autonomous Region, 2017–2022. In L. Min, F. Billé, & C. Makley (Eds.), Redacted: Writing in the negative space of the state (pp. 221–234). punctum books. doi:10.53288/0466.1.16
- Seymour, J. D., & Anderson, R. (1998). New ghosts, old ghosts: Prisons and labor reform camps in China. M. E. Sharpe.
- Smith, I. R., & Stucki, A. (2011). The colonial development of concentration camps (1868–1902). The Journal of Imperial and Commonwealth History, 39(3), 417–437. doi:10.1080/03086534.2011.598746
- Steinert, C. V. (2023). The duration of political imprisonment: Evidence from China. Conflict Management and Peace Science, 40(4), 349–372. doi:10.1177/07388942221080105
- Van Nostrand, R., Braithwaite, A., & Solomon, D. (2025). Introducing the Concentration Camps (CCamps v1.0) dataset. Journal of Peace Research, 62(4), 1328–1338. doi:10.1177/00223433241288339
- Williams, P. F., & Wu, Y. (2004). The great wall of confinement: The Chinese prison camp through contemporary fiction and reportage. University of California Press.
- Zenz, A. (2019). 'Thoroughly reforming them towards a healthy heart attitude': China's political re-education campaign in Xinjiang. Central Asian Survey, 38(1), 102–128. doi:10.1080/02634937.2018.1507997
- Zenz, A. (2025). Innovating repression: Policy experimentation and the evolution of Beijing's re-education campaign in Xinjiang. Journal of Contemporary China, 34(152), 328–349. doi:10.1080/10670564.2024.2302484

=== Forced labour ===
- Brake, B. D. (2025). Incoherence in the UFLPA's rebuttable presumption: Challenges of supply chain transparency. SN Business & Economics, 5(10), Article 152. doi:10.1007/s43546-025-00918-4
- de Pinieux, M., & Bernaz, N. (2023). Doing business in Xinjiang: Import bans in the face of gross human rights violations against the Uyghurs. Erasmus Law Review, 16(1), 61–67. doi:10.5553/elr.000248
- Kriebitz, A., & Max, R. (2020). The Xinjiang case and its implications from a business ethics perspective. Human Rights Review, 21(3), 243–265. doi:10.1007/s12142-020-00591-0
- Mulvaney, D., & Bazilian, M. (2023). Price volatility, human rights, and decarbonization challenges in global solar supply chains. Energy Research & Social Science, 102, Article 103167. doi:10.1016/j.erss.2023.103167
- Polaschek, R. (2021). Responses to the Uyghur crisis and the implications for business and human rights legislation. Business and Human Rights Journal, 6(3), 567–575. doi:10.1017/bhj.2021.44
- Ru, Y. (2024). The US Uyghur Forced Labor Protection Act: The GATT 1994 perspective. Journal of World Trade, 58(5), 761–779. doi:10.54648/trad2024038
- Salcito, K. (2023). Automotive supply chain links to the Uyghur genocide: Reversing a growing crisis. Business and Human Rights Journal, 8(2), 265–270. doi:10.1017/bhj.2023.15
- Schaefer, S., & Hauge, J. (2023). The muddled governance of state-imposed forced labour: Multinational corporations, states, and cotton from China and Uzbekistan. New Political Economy, 28(5), 799–817. doi:10.1080/13563467.2023.2184470
- Zenz, A. (2023c). Coercive labor in the cotton harvest in the Xinjiang Uyghur Autonomous Region and Uzbekistan. Communist and Post-Communist Studies, 56(2), 1–32. doi:10.1525/cpcs.2023.1822939
- Zenz, A. (2023a). Innovating penal labor: Reeducation, forced labor, and coercive social integration in the Xinjiang Uyghur Autonomous Region. The China Journal, 90, 27–53. doi:10.1086/725494
- Zenz, A. (2023d). Measuring non-internment state-imposed forced labor in Xinjiang and Central Asia: An assessment of ILO measurement guidelines. Journal of Human Trafficking. Advance online publication. doi:10.1080/23322705.2023.2270366
- Zenz, A. (2023b). The conceptual evolution of poverty alleviation through labour transfer in the Xinjiang Uyghur Autonomous Region. Central Asian Survey, 42(4), 649–673. doi:10.1080/02634937.2023.2227225

=== Genocide and ethnic cleansing ===
- Ala, M. (2021). Worse than death: Reflections on the Uyghur genocide. Hamilton Books.
- Becquelin, N. (2000). Xinjiang in the nineties. The China Journal, 44, 65–90. JSTOR 2667477
- Carrico, K. (2022). The crisis of China research in an age of genocide. HAU: Journal of Ethnographic Theory, 12(2), 405–412. doi:10.1086/720512
- Clarke, M. (2021). Settler colonialism and the path toward cultural genocide in Xinjiang. Global Responsibility to Protect, 13(1), 9–19. doi:10.1163/1875-984x-13010002
- D'Alessandra, F. (2024). Conceptualizing great power perpetrators. Genocide Studies and Prevention, 18(1), 151–189. doi:10.5038/1911-9933.18.1.1949
- Finnegan, C. (2020). The Uyghur minority in China: A case study of cultural genocide, minority rights and the insufficiency of the international legal framework in preventing state-imposed extinction. Laws, 9(1), Article 1. doi:10.3390/laws9010001
- Frangville, V. (2022). Testimonies and the Uyghur genocide metanarrative: Some reflections from the field. HAU: Journal of Ethnographic Theory, 12(2), 413–420. doi:10.1086/720368
- Grose, T. A. (2022). Chinese social media sources leave no room for denial: Documenting human rights violations in Xinjiang. HAU: Journal of Ethnographic Theory, 12(2), 392–404. doi:10.1086/721745
- Hopper, B., & Webber, M. (2009). Migration, modernisation and ethnic estrangement: Uyghur migration to Ürümqi, Xinjiang Uyghur Autonomous Region, PRC. Inner Asia, 11(2), 173–203. doi:10.1163/000000009793066460
- Howell, A., & Fan, C. C. (2011). Migration and inequality in Xinjiang: A survey of Han and Uyghur migrants in Ürümqi. Eurasian Geography and Economics, 52(1), 119–139. doi:10.2747/1539-7216.52.1.119
- Jacob, C., Gallagher, A., & Hunt, C. T. (2021). Pursuing accountability and protection for the Uighur and Muslim minorities in China. Global Responsibility to Protect, 13(1), 5–8. doi:10.1163/1875-984x-13010001
- Joniak-Lüthi, A. (2015). Xinjiang's geographies in motion. Asian Ethnicity, 16(4), 428–445. doi:10.1080/14631369.2014.1001162
- McMurray, J. (2022). Uyghur suffering, uncertainty, and academic interpretation. HAU: Journal of Ethnographic Theory, 12(2), 335–340. doi:10.1086/721183
- Robertson, M. P. (2020). Counterterrorism or cultural genocide? Theory and normativity in knowledge production about China's 'Xinjiang strategy'. Made in China Journal, 5(2), 72–81. doi:10.22459/mic.05.02.2020.06
- Slawotsky, J. (2021). Is China guilty of committing genocide in Xinjiang? Chinese Journal of International Law, 20(3), 625–635. doi:10.1093/chinesejil/jmab029
- Smith Finley, J. (2021). Why scholars and activists increasingly fear a Uyghur genocide in Xinjiang. Journal of Genocide Research, 23(3), 348–370. doi:10.1080/14623528.2020.1848109
- Smith Finley, J. (2022). Tabula rasa: Han settler colonialism and frontier genocide in "re-educated" Xinjiang. HAU: Journal of Ethnographic Theory, 12(2), 341–356. doi:10.1086/720902
- Tobin, D. (2022a). Genocidal processes: Social death in Xinjiang. Ethnic and Racial Studies, 45(16), 93–121. doi:10.1080/01419870.2021.2001556
- Tobin, D. (2022b). What does genocide feel like? An autoethnography of visual affect. HAU: Journal of Ethnographic Theory, 12(2), 357–366. doi:10.1086/720564
- Xia, X. (2023). Why China cares about Canada's Indigenous residential schools: From whataboutism to internal denial. Genocide Studies and Prevention, 17(1), 1–17. doi:10.5038/1911-9933.17.1.1906
- Yee, S. (2023). Grouphood promotion v. grouphood destruction: China's regional ethnic autonomy as antithesis to genocidal intent. Chinese Journal of International Law, 22(4), 823–849. doi:10.1093/chinesejil/jmad048
- Yusupov, R. (2022). "Crimes against sovereignty": Foreign diplomacy, state propaganda, and the Uyghur crisis in Xinjiang. HAU: Journal of Ethnographic Theory, 12(2), 382–391. doi:10.1086/720565

==== Destruction of heritage ====
- Grose, T. A. (2021). "If you don't know how, just learn": Chinese housing and the transformation of Uyghur domestic space. Ethnic and Racial Studies, 44(11), 2052–2073. doi:10.1080/01419870.2020.1789686
- Harris, R. (2022). Uyghur heritage under China's "antireligious extremism" campaigns. In J. Cuno & T. G. Weiss (Eds.), Cultural heritage and mass atrocities (pp. 133–150). Getty Publications. JSTOR jj.6142257.15
- Kobi, M. (2016). Constructing, creating and contesting cityscapes: A socio-anthropological approach to urban transformation in southern Xinjiang, People's Republic of China. Harrassowitz.
- Kobi, M. (2018). Building transregional and historical connections: Uyghur architecture in urban Xinjiang. Central Asian Survey, 37(2), 208–227. doi:10.1080/02634937.2018.1427555
- Kobi, M. (2019). Constructing cityscapes: Locality, materiality and territoriality on the urban construction site in Xinjiang Uyghur Autonomous Region, Northwest China. International Journal of Urban and Regional Research, 43(1), 46–62. doi:10.1111/1468-2427.12660
- Kobi, M. (2024). Building Shanghai in the borderlands: A visual approach to the restructuring of the Uyghur city in Xinjiang. Visual Studies, 39(1–2), 100–111. doi:10.1080/1472586x.2023.2197419
- Thum, R. (2020). The spatial cleansing of Xinjiang: Mazar desecration in context. Made in China Journal, 5(2), 48–61. doi:10.22459/mic.05.02.2020.04
- Tynen, S. (2020). State territorialization through shequ community centres: Bureaucratic confusion in Xinjiang, China. Territory, Politics, Governance, 8(1), 7–22. doi:10.1080/21622671.2019.1643778

==== Birth suppression ====
- Anderson, B. A., & Silver, B. D. (1995). Ethnic differences in fertility and sex ratios at birth in China: Evidence from Xinjiang. Population Studies, 49(2), 211–226. doi:10.1080/0032472031000148476
- Byler, D. (2022a). Eliminate all illegal births: Negative eugenics and Uyghur women as objects of contestation. HAU: Journal of Ethnographic Theory, 12(2), 367–372. doi:10.1086/720761
- Chaparro-Buitrago, J. (2024). Sterilizing body-territories: Understanding contemporary cases of forced sterilization in the United States and China. Feminist Anthropology, 5(2), 215–229. doi:10.1002/fea2.12135
- Li, J., & Qiu, L. (2024). Demographic transition and population dynamics in Xinjiang, China. China Population and Development Studies, 8(1), 78–95. doi:10.1007/s42379-024-00152-9
- Turdush, R., & Fiskesjö, M. (2021). Dossier: Uyghur women in China's genocide. Genocide Studies and Prevention, 15(1), 22–43. doi:10.5038/1911-9933.15.1.1834
- Zenz, A. (2021). 'End the dominance of the Uyghur ethnic group': An analysis of Beijing's population optimization strategy in southern Xinjiang. Central Asian Survey, 40(3), 291–312. doi:10.1080/02634937.2021.1946483

=== International responses ===
- Gallagher, A. (2021). To name and shame or not, and if so, how? A pragmatic analysis of naming and shaming the Chinese government over mass atrocity crimes against the Uyghurs and other Muslim minorities in Xinjiang. Journal of Global Security Studies, 6(4), Article ogab013. doi:10.1093/jogss/ogab013
- Hendler, B., Corrêa, G. T. R., & Martins, W. W. (2024). Understanding Muslim countries' support for China's actions in Xinjiang: A qualitative-comparative analysis. Contexto Internacional, 46(1). doi:10.1590/s0102-8529.20244601
- Kelemen, B., & Turcsányi, R. Q. (2020). It's the politics, stupid: China's relations with Muslim countries on the background of Xinjiang crackdown. Asian Ethnicity, 21(2), 223–243. doi:10.1080/14631369.2019.1677145
- Proń, E., & Szwajnoch, E. (2020). Kyrgyz and Kazakh responses to China's Xinjiang policy under Xi Jinping. Asian Affairs, 51(4), 761–778. doi:10.1080/03068374.2020.1827547
- Shakhanova, G. (2024). Normative power China: Why Kazakhstan is ignoring the 're-education' camps in Xinjiang. Europe-Asia Studies, 76(5), 770–792. doi:10.1080/09668136.2024.2336511
- Švec, J. (2026). From concealment to partial acknowledgment to tactical policy shifts: China's response to international pressure regarding Xinjiang re-education camps. Modern China, 52(2), 131–175. doi:10.1177/00977004251385434

== Society and culture ==
=== Nationalism ===
- Baranovitch, N. (2003). From the margins to the centre: The Uyghur challenge in Beijing. The China Quarterly, 175, 726–750. doi:10.1017/s0305741003000420
- Bellér-Hann, I., Cesàro, M. C., Harris, R., & Smith Finley, J. (Eds.). (2007). Situating the Uyghurs between China and Central Asia. Ashgate.
- Brophy, D. (2018). The Uyghurs: Making a nation. In Oxford research encyclopedia of Asian history. Oxford University Press. doi:10.1093/acrefore/9780190277727.013.318
- Gladney, D. C. (1990). The ethnogenesis of the Uighur. Central Asian Survey, 9(1), 1–28. doi:10.1080/02634939008400687
- Gladney, D. C. (2004). Dislocating China: Muslims, minorities, and other subaltern subjects. University of Chicago Press.
- Kamalov, A. K. (2026). Frontier and identity: Changing ideas about homeland in the Uyghur society of the Ili River valley in the 19th–21st centuries. Herald of the Russian Academy of Sciences, 96(S2), S151–S164. doi:10.1134/s101933162660232x
- Rudelson, J. J. (1997). Oasis identities: Uyghur nationalism along China's Silk Road. Columbia University Press.
- Smith, J. N. (2002). "Making culture matter": Symbolic, spatial and social boundaries between Uyghurs and Han Chinese. Asian Ethnicity, 3(2), 153–174. doi:10.1080/14631360220132718
- Smith Finley, J. N. (2013). The art of symbolic resistance: Uyghur identities and Uyghur-Han relations in contemporary Xinjiang. Brill. doi:10.1163/9789004256781
- Thum, R. (2014). The sacred routes of Uyghur history. Harvard University Press. doi:10.4159/harvard.9780674736238

=== Everyday life ===
- Abdukadir, A., Dubrovin, D., Amat, N., Liu, W., Hasim, A., Aikemu, A., Mamtimin, B., & Upur, H. (2015). The origins of Uyghur medicine: Debates and perspectives. Journal of Traditional Chinese Medical Sciences, 2(4), 217–226. doi:10.1016/j.jtcms.2016.03.003
- Bellér-Hann, I., & Hann, C. (2020). The great dispossession: Uyghurs between civilizations. LIT Verlag. doi:10.52038/978-3643-91367-8
- Cesàro, M. C. (2000). Consuming identities: Food and resistance among the Uyghur in contemporary Xinjiang. Inner Asia, 2(2), 225–238. doi:10.1163/146481700793647850
- Dautcher, J. (2009). Down a narrow road: Identity and masculinity in a Uyghur community in Xinjiang China. Harvard University Asia Center. doi:10.1163/9781684174850
- Ding, M. (2022). The traveling minzu: Uyghur Muslim migration and the negotiation of identities. Routledge. doi:10.4324/9781003264057
- Hayes, A., & Qarluq, A. (2011). Securitising HIV/AIDS in the Xinjiang Uyghur Autonomous Region. Australian Journal of International Affairs, 65(2), 203–219. doi:10.1080/10357718.2011.550104
- Mirsultan, A., Schluessel, E. T., & Sulaiman, E. (Eds.). (2022). Community still matters: Uyghur culture and society in Central Asian context. NIAS Press.
- Roberts, S. R. (1998a). Negotiating locality, Islam, and national culture in a changing borderlands: The revival of the mäshräp ritual among young Uighur men in the Ili valley. Central Asian Survey, 17(4), 673–699. doi:10.1080/02634939808401063
- Steenberg, R. (2020). The formal side of informality: Non-state trading practices and local Uyghur ethnography. Central Asian Survey, 39(1), 46–62. doi:10.1080/02634937.2019.1697207
- Zang, X. (2017). Uyghur conceptions of family and society: Habits of the Uyghur heart. Routledge. doi:10.4324/9781315222806

=== Gender ===
- Bellér-Hann, I. (1998). Crafts, entrepreneurship and gendered economic relations in southern Xinjiang in the era of 'socialist commodity economy'. Central Asian Survey, 17(4), 701–718. doi:10.1080/02634939808401064
- Cui, Y., & De Costa, P. I. (2024). Becoming Uyghur elites: How Uyghur women in a mainstream Chinese university negotiate their gendered identities. Journal of Language, Identity & Education, 23(2), 288–303. doi:10.1080/15348458.2021.1988607
- Ekinci, A. (2022). Muslim, modern, model subjects: Writing Uyghur women into the Chinese nation, 1949–1966. Sextant, 38, 123–146. doi:10.4000/sextant.782
- Leibold, J., & Grose, T. (2016). Islamic veiling in Xinjiang: The political and societal struggle to define Uyghur female adornment. The China Journal, 76, 78–102. doi:10.1086/683283
- Rodríguez-Merino, P. A., & Zhang, C. (2023). Impaired, "easy prey" saved by the she-empowering state: Official narratives of "Xinjiang women" in China's "People's War on Terror". International Feminist Journal of Politics, 25(5), 918–940. doi:10.1080/14616742.2022.2159850
- Tynen, S. (2021). Belonging between inclusion and exclusion: Dimensions of ethno-cultural identity for Uyghur women in Xinjiang, China. Geopolitics, 26(4), 1243–1266. doi:10.1080/14650045.2019.1686360
- Whetstone, C., & Yılmaz, M. (2026). Gendering internal colonialism: Engaging reproductive justice and digital testimony of Uyghurs in diaspora. International Feminist Journal of Politics, 28(3), 633–658. doi:10.1080/14616742.2026.2672572
- Zang, X. (2008). Gender and ethnic variation in arranged marriages in a Chinese city. Journal of Family Issues, 29(5), 615–638. doi:10.1177/0192513x07308039

=== Media ===
- Alpermann, B., & Malzer, M. (2024). "In other news": China's international media strategy on Xinjiang—CGTN and New China TV on YouTube. Modern China, 50(2), 135–178. doi:10.1177/00977004231169008
- Brown, M. S., & O'Brien, D. (2023). "Making the past serve the present": The testimonial tourist gaze and infrastructures of memory in Xinjiang Uyghur Autonomous Region (XUAR), China. Journal of Current Chinese Affairs, 52(2), 256–286. doi:10.1177/18681026221121828
- Clothey, R. A., Koku, E. F., Erkin, E., & Emat, H. (2016). A voice for the voiceless: Online social activism in Uyghur language blogs and state control of the Internet in China. Information, Communication & Society, 19(6), 858–874. doi:10.1080/1369118x.2015.1061577
- Clothey, R. A., & Koku, E. F. (2017). Oppositional consciousness, cultural preservation, and everyday resistance on the Uyghur Internet. Asian Ethnicity, 18(3), 351–370. doi:10.1080/14631369.2016.1158636
- Fayard, G. (2021). Sun, sand and submachine guns: Tourism in a militarized Xinjiang, China. The China Quarterly, 248, 1129–1151. doi:10.1017/s0305741021000515
- O'Brien, D., & Brown, M. S. (2026). Neo-propaganda is in vogue: Romanticising Xinjiang through global media. Journal of Current Chinese Affairs, 55(2), 183–211. doi:10.1177/18681026251364903

=== Arts and music ===
- Anderson, A., & Byler, D. (2019). "Eating Hanness": Uyghur musical tradition in a time of re-education. China Perspectives, 2019(3), 17–26. doi:10.4000/chinaperspectives.9358
- Baranovitch, N. (2007a). From resistance to adaptation: Uyghur popular music and changing attitudes among Uyghur youth. The China Journal, 58, 59–82. doi:10.1086/tcj.58.20066307
- Frangville, V., & Imin, S. (2026). Decolonizing Uyghur visual art: Uyghur diasporic responses to China's cultural engineering. Central Asian Survey. Advance online publication. doi:10.1080/02634937.2025.2606135
- Hai, P. (2025). Re-marking Xinjiang. The Journal of Asian Studies, 84(4), 970–989. doi:10.1215/00219118-11906152
- Harris, R. (2005). Reggae on the Silk Road: The globalization of Uyghur pop. The China Quarterly, 183, 627–643. doi:10.1017/s0305741005000391
- Harris, R. (2008). The making of a musical canon in Chinese Central Asia: The Uyghur twelve muqam. Ashgate.
- Harris, R. (2020b). "A weekly mäshräp to tackle extremism": Music-making in Uyghur communities and intangible cultural heritage in China. Ethnomusicology, 64(1), 23–55. doi:10.5406/ethnomusicology.64.1.0023
- Harris, R. (2024). The aesthetics and imaginaries of Uyghur heritage, Chinese tourism, and the Xinjiang dance craze. International Journal of Heritage Studies, 30(8), 872–887. doi:10.1080/13527258.2024.2342289
- Light, N. (2008). Intimate heritage: Creating Uyghur muqam song in Xinjiang. LIT Verlag. doi:10.52038/978-38258-1120-4
- Wong, C.-F. (2023). Even in the rain: Uyghur music in modern China. University of Hawaii Press. doi:10.1515/9780824895020

=== Religion ===
- Brophy, D. (2019). Good and bad Muslims in Xinjiang. Made in China Journal, 4(2). doi:10.22459/mic.04.02.2019.05
- Castets, R. (2015). The modern Chinese state and strategies of control over Uyghur Islam. Central Asian Affairs, 2(3), 221–245. doi:10.1163/22142290-00203001
- Dillon, M. (2015). Religion, repression, and traditional Uyghur culture in southern Xinjiang: Kashgar and Khotan. Central Asian Affairs, 2(3), 246–263. doi:10.1163/22142290-00203002
- Morrison, P. (1985). Islam in Xinjiang. Religion in Communist Lands, 13(3), 244–249. doi:10.1080/09637498508431205
- Smith Finley, J. (2007). Chinese oppression in Xinjiang, Middle Eastern conflicts and global Islamic solidarities among the Uyghurs. Journal of Contemporary China, 16(53), 627–654. doi:10.1080/10670560701562333
- Smith Finley, J. (2019b). The Wang Lixiong prophecy: 'Palestinization' in Xinjiang and the consequences of Chinese state securitization of religion. Central Asian Survey, 38(1), 81–101. doi:10.1080/02634937.2018.1534802

==== Islam and Sufism ====
- Bellér-Hann, I. (2001a). 'Making the oil fragrant': Dealings with the supernatural among the Uyghurs in Xinjiang. Asian Ethnicity, 2(1), 9–23. doi:10.1080/14631360120017988
- Bellér-Hann, I. (2015). Negotiating identities: Work, religion, gender, and the mobilisation of tradition among the Uyghur in the 1990s. LIT Verlag. doi:10.52038/978-3643-90745-5
- Bellér-Hann, I. (2020). Uyghur religion. In S. Feuchtwang (Ed.), Handbook on religion in China. Edward Elgar. doi:10.4337/9781786437969.00025
- Harris, R., & Dawut, R. (2002). Mazar festivals of the Uyghurs: Music, Islam and the Chinese state. British Journal of Ethnomusicology, 11(1), 101–118. doi:10.1080/09681220208567330
- Harris, R., & Isa, A. (2019). Islam by smartphone: Reading the Uyghur Islamic revival on WeChat. Central Asian Survey, 38(1), 61–80. doi:10.1080/02634937.2018.1492904
- Harris, R. (2020a). Soundscapes of Uyghur Islam. Indiana University Press. JSTOR j.ctv1574p9g
- Harris, R., Ha, G., & Jaschok, M. (Eds.). (2021). Ethnographies of Islam in China. University of Hawaii Press. doi:10.1515/9780824886431
- Shinmen, Y., Sawada, M., & Waite, E. (Eds.). (2013). Muslim saints and mausoleums in Central Asia and Xinjiang. Librairie d'Amérique et d'Orient Jean Maisonneuve.
- Sugawara, J., & Dawut, R. (Eds.). (2016). Mazar: Studies on Islamic sacred sites in Central Eurasia. Tokyo University of Foreign Studies Press.
- Thum, R. (2012a). Beyond resistance and nationalism: Local history and the case of Afaq Khoja. Central Asian Survey, 31(3), 293–310. doi:10.1080/02634937.2012.722366
- Thum, R. (2014). The sacred routes of Uyghur history. Harvard University Press. doi:10.4159/harvard.9780674736238
- Waite, E. (2006a). From holy man to national villain: Popular historical narratives about Apaq Khoja amongst Uyghurs in contemporary Xinjiang. Inner Asia, 8(1), 5–28. doi:10.1163/146481706793646837
- Waite, E. (2006b). The impact of the state on Islam amongst the Uyghurs: Religious knowledge and authority in the Kashgar Oasis. Central Asian Survey, 25(3), 251–265. doi:10.1080/02634930601022534
- Zang, X. (2012a). Islam, family life, and gender inequality in urban China. Routledge. doi:10.4324/9780203180976
- Zang, X. (2012b). Uyghur Islamic piety in Ürümchi, Xinjiang. Chinese Sociological Review, 44(4), 82–100. doi:10.2753/csa2162-0555440404

==== Christianity ====
- Erbay, F. (2023). Two stories written in Eastern Turki as part of the Swedish missionary work (Svenska Missionsförbundet) in East Turkistan. Acta Orientalia Academiae Scientiarum Hungaricae, 76(3), 469–486. doi:10.1556/062.2023.00331
- Erbay, F., Doğan, E., & Karavelioğlu, M. A. (2025). Use of 20th century terminological language in their missionary work: The case of the Eastern Turki. Trames, 29(1), 79–104. doi:10.3176/tr.2025.1.05
- Horlemann, B. (2009). The Divine Word missionaries in Gansu, Qinghai and Xinjiang, 1922–1953: A bibliographic note. Journal of the Royal Asiatic Society, 19(1), 59–82. doi:10.1017/s135618630800905x
- Hultvall, J. (1987). Mission and change in Eastern Turkestan: An authorised translation of the original Swedish text. Heart of Asia Ministries.
- Jarring, G. (1991). Prints from Kashghar: The printing-office of the Swedish mission in Eastern Turkestan: History and production with an attempt at a bibliography. Svenska Forskningsinstitutet i Istanbul.

=== Literature ===
- Abramson, K. (2012). Gender, Uyghur identity, and the story of Nuzugum. The Journal of Asian Studies, 71(4), 1069–1091. doi:10.1017/s0021911812001179
- Abujad, I. M., & Linzy, B. (2024). Erasure and empire: Uyghur Muslim cultural resistance to genocide under the global war on terror. Asiatic: IIUM Journal of English Language and Literature, 18(2), 51–70. doi:10.31436/asiatic.v18i2.3420
- Baranovitch, N. (2007b). Inverted exile: Uyghur writers and artists in Beijing and the political implications of their work. Modern China, 33(4), 462–504. doi:10.1177/0097700407304803
- Baranovitch, N. (2023). 'Farewell, my Uyghur language': Linguistic anxiety and resistance in Uyghur poetry and songs, 1990s–2010s. Modern Asian Studies, 57(6), 2022–2066. doi:10.1017/s0026749x23000185
- Bellér-Hann, I. (2004). Hair-raising stories: The trickster in Uyghur oral tradition. Asian Anthropology, 3(1), 13–38. doi:10.1080/1683478x.2004.10552541
- Brophy, D. (2022). Enslavement and forced marriage in Uyghur literature. In L. Murphy (Ed.), The Cambridge companion to global literature and slavery (pp. 78–92). Cambridge University Press. doi:10.1017/9781009070928.009
- Byler, D. (2018a). Claiming the mystical self in new modernist Uyghur poetry. Contemporary Islam, 12(2), 173–192. doi:10.1007/s11562-018-0413-2
- Eden, J. (2019). Warrior saints of the Silk Road: Legends of the Qarakhanids. Brill. doi:10.1163/9789004384279
- Elkun, A. I. (2025). Imprisoned souls. Hertfordshire Press.
- Elkun, A. I. (Ed.). (2023). Uyghur poems. Everyman's Library.
- Freeman, J. L. (2018). Uyghur newspapers in Republican China: The emergence of mass media in Xinjiang. In T. Onuma, D. Brophy, & Y. Shinmen (Eds.), Xinjiang in the context of Central Eurasian transformations. Toyo Bunko.
- Freeman, J. L. (2021). Nation building across national borders: A Uyghur hero in three socialist states. Asian Ethnicity, 22(1), 140–154. doi:10.1080/14631369.2020.1827946
- Ha, G., & Slavs and Tatars (Eds.). (2021). The contest of the fruits. MIT Press.
- Kaşgarlı, R. (2026). Reflection of social realism in contemporary Uyghur literature: Yalqun Rozi and literary criticism. Selçuk Üniversitesi Türkiyat Araştırmaları Dergisi, (67), 115–137. doi:10.21563/sutad.1725849
- Kind, K. (2021). Musulman knowledge, local history, and the making of the Qing nation-state. Late Imperial China, 42(2), 91–135. doi:10.1353/late.2021.0007
- Mahmut, D., & Smith Finley, J. (2022). Corrective 're-education' as (cultural) genocide: A content analysis of the Uyghur primary school textbook Til ädäbiyat. In M. Clarke (Ed.), The Xinjiang emergency: Exploring the causes and consequences of China's mass detention of Uyghurs (pp. 181–226). Manchester University Press. doi:10.7765/9781526153128.00015
- Musapir. (2022). Vanishing art, genre-making: The Uyghur storytelling tradition and its heritagisation. In S. R. Bin Tyeer & C. Gallien (Eds.), Islam and new directions in world literature (pp. 164–190). Edinburgh University Press. doi:10.3366/edinburgh/9781474484053.003.0006
- Osman, A. (2015). Uyghurland, the farthest exile (J. Yang, Trans.). Deep Vellum.
- Reichl, K. (2019). Oral epics along the Silk Road: The Turkic traditions of Xinjiang. CHINOPERL, 38(1), 45–63. doi:10.1080/01937774.2019.1633161
- Rozieva, D., & Oldfield, A. (2015). Introduction to the work of Uygur poet Bakhtiya. CLCWeb: Comparative Literature and Culture, 17(2). doi:10.7771/1481-4374.2429
- Thum, R. (2012b). Modular history: Identity maintenance before Uyghur nationalism. The Journal of Asian Studies, 71(3), 627–653. doi:10.1017/s0021911812000629
- Tursun, P. (2022). The backstreets: A novel from Xinjiang (D. Byler & an anonymous translator, Trans.). Columbia University Press. doi:10.7312/turs20290
- Zelcer-Lavid, M. (2018). Modern education and literary traditions: A comparative view on the development of modern Uyghur and Tibetan literature. Central Asian Survey, 37(4), 563–581. doi:10.1080/02634937.2018.1492905
- Zelcer-Lavid, M. (2022). "Green-colored Uyghur poet": Religion, nostalgia, and identity in contemporary Uyghur poetry. Modern China, 48(4), 846–877. doi:10.1177/00977004211064987
- Zelcer-Lavid, M. (2025). Big bad wolf: Masculinity and heroes in modern Uyghur literature. In J. Ptáčková & O. Klimeš (Eds.), Cultural security in contemporary China and Mongolia (pp. 121–147). Amsterdam University Press. doi:10.5117/9789463722889_ch05

=== Language ===
- Abdulehed, M. (2024). Role of teaching Uyghur language in shaping cultural identity of children of Uyghur diaspora. In R. Clothey & D. Mahmut (Eds.), Uyghur identity and culture: A global diaspora in a time of crisis (pp. 77–88). Routledge. doi:10.4324/9781003305576-8
- Abdurehim, E. (2014). The Lopnor dialect of Uyghur: A descriptive analysis. University of Helsinki.
- Baki, A. (2012). Language contact between Uyghur and Chinese in Xinjiang, PRC: Uyghur elements in Xinjiang Putonghua. International Journal of the Sociology of Language, 2012(215). doi:10.1515/ijsl-2012-0028
- Baranovitch, N. (2022). The "bilingual education" policy in Xinjiang revisited: New evidence of open resistance and active support among the Uyghur elite. Modern China, 48(1), 134–166. doi:10.1177/0097700420969135
- Cabras, G. (2017). Language ideologies in a Uyghur comedy sketch: The comedy sketch Chüshenmidim 'I don't understand' and the importance of Sap Uyghur. International Journal of the Sociology of Language, 2017(248). doi:10.1515/ijsl-2017-0032
- Cabras, G. (2025). Language ideologies and cultural security: The status and meanings of the Uyghur language. In J. Ptáčková & O. Klimeš (Eds.), Cultural security in contemporary China and Mongolia (pp. 149–176). Amsterdam University Press. doi:10.5117/9789463722889_ch06
- Dwyer, A. M. (2005). The Xinjiang conflict: Uyghur identity, language policy, and political discourse. East-West Center Washington.
- Engesæth, T., Yakup, M., & Dwyer, A. M. (2009). Greetings from the Teklimakan: A handbook of Modern Uyghur. University of Kansas Scholarworks.
- Erdal, M. (2004). A grammar of Old Turkic. Brill. doi:10.1163/9789047403968
- Ghalip, M. (2024). Language ideology as identity in the Uyghur diaspora. Made in China Journal, 9(1). doi:10.22459/mic.09.01.2024.17
- Grose, T. (2012). Uyghur language textbooks: Competing images of a multi-ethnic China. Asian Studies Review, 36(3), 369–389. doi:10.1080/10357823.2012.711809
- Hahn, R. F. (1991). Spoken Uyghur. University of Washington Press.
- Han, Y., & Cassels Johnson, D. (2021). Chinese language policy and Uyghur youth: Examining language policies and language ideologies. Journal of Language, Identity & Education, 20(3), 183–196. doi:10.1080/15348458.2020.1753193
- Jarring, G. (1964). An Eastern Turki–English dialect dictionary. C. W. K. Gleerup.
- Jarring, G. (2026). An Eastern Turki–English dictionary (B. N. Schlyter, Ed.; Rev. and expanded ed.). Brill. doi:10.1163/9789004721784
- Johanson, L., & Csató, É. Á. (Eds.). (2021). The Turkic languages (2nd ed.). Routledge. doi:10.4324/9781003243809
- Major, T. (2022). Revisiting the syntax of monsters in Uyghur. Linguistic Inquiry, 53(4), 780–807. doi:10.1162/ling_a_00424
- Mayer, C., McCollum, A., & Eziz, G. (2022). Issues in Uyghur phonology. Language and Linguistics Compass, 16(12), Article e12478. doi:10.1111/lnc3.12478
- McCollum, A. G. (2021). Transparency, locality, and contrast in Uyghur backness harmony. Laboratory Phonology, 12(1), Article 10. doi:10.5334/labphon.239
- Memtimin, A. (2016). Language contact in Modern Uyghur. Harrassowitz. JSTOR j.ctvc77101
- Nadzhip, E. N. (1971). Modern Uigur (D. M. Segal, Trans.). Nauka.
- Nazarova, G., & Niyaz, K. (2013). Uyghur: An elementary textbook. Georgetown University Press.
- Schluessel, E. T. (2007). 'Bilingual' education and discontent in Xinjiang. Central Asian Survey, 26(2), 251–277. doi:10.1080/02634930701517482
- Schluessel, E. T. (2018). An introduction to Chaghatay: A graded textbook for reading Central Asian sources. Maize Books. doi:10.3998/mpub.10110094
- Schwarz, H. G. (1992). An Uyghur–English dictionary. Center for East Asian Studies, Western Washington University. doi:10.25710/c1bm-2e85
- Shklovsky, K., & Sudo, Y. (2014). The syntax of monsters. Linguistic Inquiry, 45(3), 381–402. doi:10.1162/ling_a_00160
- Smith Finley, J., & Zang, X. (Eds.). (2015). Language, education and Uyghur identity in urban Xinjiang. Routledge. doi:10.4324/9781315726588
- Sugar, A. (2017). Mandarin Chinese verbs as verbal items in Uyghur mixed verbs. Languages, 2(1), Article 1. doi:10.3390/languages2010001
- Tömür, H. (2003). Modern Uyghur grammar (morphology) (A. Lee, Trans.). Yıldız Teknik Üniversitesi.
- Tsung, L. (2014). Language power and hierarchy: Multilingual education in China. Bloomsbury Academic. doi:10.5040/9781472593627
- Yakup, A. (2005). The Turfan dialect of Uyghur. Harrassowitz.
- Yakup, A. (2023). Aspects of early Chinese global lexical copies surviving in Modern Uyghur. Journal of Pidgin and Creole Languages, 38(1), 83–117. doi:10.1075/jpcl.00105.yak
- Ye, X. (2025). Digital technologies and identity negotiation: A study of trilingual Uyghur university students' language learning experiences in intranational migrations. ReCALL, 37(2), 232–249. doi:10.1017/s0958344024000296
- Zhou, M. (2003). Multilingualism in China: The politics of writing reforms for minority languages 1949–2002. Mouton de Gruyter. doi:10.1515/9783110924596

== Diaspora ==
- Chen, Y.-W. (2014). The Uyghur lobby: Global networks, coalitions and strategies of the World Uyghur Congress. Routledge. doi:10.4324/9781315885421
- Clothey, R., & Mahmut, D. (Eds.). (2024). Uyghur identity and culture: A global diaspora in a time of crisis. Routledge. doi:10.4324/9781003305576
- Dukalskis, A. (2021). Making the world safe for dictatorship. Oxford University Press. doi:10.1093/oso/9780197520130.001.0001
- Harb, M., & Wackenhut, A. F. (2026). Transnational repression in an age of global authoritarianism: Experiences of Uyghur diaspora activists in Sweden. Ethnic and Racial Studies, 49(11), 2279–2296. doi:10.1080/01419870.2026.2624635
- Hayes, A. (2016). Uighur transnationalism in contemporary Australia: Exile, sanctuary, community and future. In A. Hayes & R. Mason (Eds.), Cultures in refuge: Seeking sanctuary in modern Australia (pp. 196–211). Routledge. doi:10.4324/9781315575537
- Kurmangaliyeva Ercilasun, G., & Ercilasun, K. (Eds.). (2018). The Uyghur community: Diaspora, identity and geopolitics. Palgrave Macmillan. doi:10.1057/978-1-137-52297-9
- Lemon, E., Jardine, B., & Hall, N. (2022). Globalizing minority persecution: China's transnational repression of the Uyghurs. Globalizations, 20(4), 564–580. doi:10.1080/14747731.2022.2135944
- Lemon, E., & Jardine, B. (2024). "We are living in fear": Transnational repression, regime type, and double precarity in the Uyghur diaspora. Diaspora, 24(1), 117–140. doi:10.3138/diaspora.24.1.2024.01.01
- Musapir, & Steenberg, R. (2026). Where is my family? Contemporary Uyghur activism in the transnational diaspora. Critical Asian Studies, 58(2), 347–367. doi:10.1080/14672715.2026.2625819
- Palmer, S. J., Mahmut, D., & Udun, A. (2024). Uyghur women activists in the diaspora: Restorying a genocide. Bloomsbury. doi:10.5040/9781350418363
- Reyhan, D. (2026). China's transnational repression (CTR) on Uyghur diaspora and its new forms. In M. Hasan & A. E. Ruud (Eds.), The long reach of the strong arm: Evolving forms of transnational authoritarianism (pp. 127–142). Palgrave Macmillan. doi:10.1007/978-3-032-04940-7_7
- Roberts, S. R. (2024). Biopolitics without borders: China's racially profiled transnational repression of the Uyghur people. In D. M. Moss & S. Furstenberg (Eds.), Transnational repression in the age of globalisation (pp. 143–164). Edinburgh University Press. doi:10.3366/edinburgh/9781399506069.003.0007
- Shichor, Y. (2010). Net nationalism: The digitalization of the Uyghur diaspora. In P. Oiarzabal & A. Alonso (Eds.), Diasporas in the new media age: Identity, politics, and community (pp. 291–316). University of Nevada Press.

=== Turkey ===
- Çölgeçen, A. E. (2026). Ungrievable lives: State and non-state authoritarianism in the making of Uyghur foreign fighters. Ethnicities. Advance online publication. doi:10.1177/14687968261494154
- Elikücük Yıldırım, N. (2024). Legitimation, co-optation, and survival: Why is Turkey silent on China's persecution of Uyghurs? Democratization, 31(6), 1183–1204. doi:10.1080/13510347.2023.2293154
- Hovsepyan, L. (2023). The main factors underpinning Turkey–China relations: The 'Turkic world' narrative and its implications for future relations. China Report, 59(4), 456–472. doi:10.1177/00094455231188100
- Oztig, L. I., & Karluk, A. C. (2024). The impact of China's high-tech repression on Uyghurs: A case study of Uyghur diaspora in Turkiye. Central Asian Survey, 43(4), 504–522. doi:10.1080/02634937.2024.2343784
- Pandey, D. (2022). Refugees in host countries: A comparative study between Uyghurs in Turkey and Tibetans in India. Asian Journal of Comparative Politics, 8(1), 400–421. doi:10.1177/20578911221128880
- Rahman, S., & Byler, D. (2022). China's soft power, counter-localisation, and the role of stateless Uyghurs in Turkey. Made in China Journal, 7(2), 74–79. doi:10.22459/mic.07.02.2022.06
- Shichor, Y. (2009). Ethno-diplomacy: The Uyghur hitch in Sino-Turkish relations (Policy Studies No. 53). East-West Center.
- Uluyol, Y. (2026). The Uyghur factor in China-Turkey relations: Insecurity, transnational repression, and legitimacy. Asian Perspective, 50(2), 337–361. doi:10.1353/apr.2026.a991336

=== Central Asia ===
- Bellér-Hann, I. (2001b). Rivalry and solidarity among Uyghur healers in Kazakhstan. Inner Asia, 3(1), 71–96. doi:10.1163/146481701793647714
- Harris, R., & Kamalov, A. (2020). Nation, religion and social heat: Heritaging Uyghur mäshräp in Kazakhstan. Central Asian Survey, 40(1), 9–33. doi:10.1080/02634937.2020.1835825
- Kamalov, A. (2012). Ethno-national and local dimensions in the historiography of Kazakhstan's Uyghurs. Central Asian Survey, 31(3), 343–354. doi:10.1080/02634937.2012.729317
- Kamalov, A. (2021a). Identity of Kazakhstan's Uyghurs: Migration, homeland, and language. Central Asian Affairs, 8(4), 319–345. doi:10.30965/22142290-12340011
- Kokaisl, P. (2020). State-building in the Soviet Union and the idea of the Uyghurs in Central Asia. Asian Studies Review, 44(4), 709–725. doi:10.1080/10357823.2020.1738337
- Roberts, S. R. (1998b). The Uighurs of the Kazakhstan borderlands: Migration and the nation. Nationalities Papers, 26(3), 511–530. doi:10.1080/00905999808408580
- Shichor, Y. (2015). Pawns in Central Asia's playground: Uyghurs between Moscow and Beijing. East Asia, 32(2), 101–116. doi:10.1007/s12140-015-9228-4

== Primary sources ==
=== Chronicles and texts ===
- Clark, L. (Ed.). (2013). Uygur Manichaean texts: Vol. 2. Liturgical texts: Texts, translations, commentary. Brepols.
- Clark, L. (Ed.). (2018). Uygur Manichaean texts: Vol. 3. Ecclesiastical texts: Texts, translations, commentary. Brepols.
- Dughlat, M. H. (1996). Mirza Haydar Dughlat's Tarikh-i-Rashidi: A history of the khans of Moghulistan (W. M. Thackston, Trans.). Harvard University, Department of Near Eastern Languages and Civilizations.
- Jarring, G. (1946–1951). Materials to the knowledge of Eastern Turki: Tales, poetry, proverbs, riddles, ethnological and historical texts from the southern parts of Eastern Turkestan, with translation and notes (Vols. 1–4). C. W. K. Gleerup.
- Kāšγarī, M. (1982–1985). Compendium of the Turkic dialects (Dīwān Luγāt at-Turk) (R. Dankoff, Ed. & Trans., with J. Kelly; Vols. 1–3). Harvard University Printing Office.
- Schluessel, E. T. (2014). The world as seen from Yarkand: Ghulām Muḥammad Khān's 1920s chronicle Mā Tīṭayniŋ wāqiʿasi. NIHU Program Islamic Area Studies.
- Shaw, R. B. (1897). The history of the Khōjas of Eastern-Turkistān, summarised from the Tazkira-i-Khwājagān of Muḥammad Sādiq Kāshgharī (N. Elias, Ed.). Asiatic Society.
- Yūsuf Khāṣṣ Ḥājib. (1983). Wisdom of royal glory (Kutadgu bilig): A Turko-Islamic mirror for princes (R. Dankoff, Trans.). University of Chicago Press.

=== Memoirs ===
- Cain, G. (2021). The perfect police state: An undercover odyssey into China's terrifying surveillance dystopia of the future. PublicAffairs.
- Chanisheff, S. (2018). The land drenched in tears (R. Mahmut, Trans.). Hertfordshire Press.
- Haitiwaji, G., & Morgat, R. (2022). How I survived a Chinese "reeducation" camp: A Uyghur woman's story (E. Gauvin, Trans.). Seven Stories Press. (Original work published 2021)
- Hoja, G. (2023). A stone is most precious where it belongs: A memoir of Uyghur exile, hope, and survival. Hachette Books.
- Izgil, T. H. (2023). Waiting to be arrested at night: A Uyghur poet's memoir of China's genocide (J. L. Freeman, Trans.). Penguin Press.
- Kadeer, R., & Cavelius, A. (2009). Dragon fighter: One woman's epic struggle for peace with China. Kales Press.
- Sauytbay, S., & Cavelius, A. (2021). The chief witness: Escape from China's modern-day concentration camps (C. Waight, Trans.). Scribe.
- Tohti, I. (2022). We Uyghurs have no say: An imprisoned writer speaks (Y. Cao, C. Carter, & M. P. Robertson, Trans.). Verso.
- Turkel, N. (2022). No escape: The true story of China's genocide of the Uyghurs. Hanover Square Press.

=== Travel accounts ===
- Bellew, H. W. (1875). Kashmir and Kashghar: A narrative of the journey of the embassy to Kashghar in 1873–74. Trübner.
- Cable, M., & French, F. (1942). The Gobi Desert. Hodder & Stoughton.
- Fleming, P. (1936). News from Tartary: A journey from Peking to Kashmir. Jonathan Cape.
- Forsyth, T. D. (1875). Report of a mission to Yarkund in 1873, under command of Sir T. D. Forsyth, with historical and geographical information regarding the possessions of the Ameer of Yarkund. Foreign Department Press.
- Hedin, S. (1898). Through Asia (Vols. 1–2). Methuen.
- Jarring, G. (1986). Return to Kashgar: Central Asian memoirs in the present (E. Claeson, Trans.). Duke University Press.
- Kuropatkin, A. N. (1882). Kashgaria, Eastern or Chinese Turkistan: Historical and geographical sketch of the country, its military strength, industries, and trade (W. E. Gowan, Trans.). Thacker, Spink.
- Lattimore, O. (1930). High Tartary. Little, Brown.
- Le Coq, A. von. (1928). Buried treasures of Chinese Turkestan: An account of the activities and adventures of the second and third German Turfan expeditions (A. Barwell, Trans.). George Allen & Unwin.
- Macartney, C. T. (1931). An English lady in Chinese Turkestan. Ernest Benn.
- Maillart, E. K. (1937). Forbidden journey: From Peking to Kashmir. Heinemann.
- Mannerheim, C. G. (1940). Across Asia from west to east in 1906–1908 (Vols. 1–2). Suomalais-Ugrilainen Seura.
- Przhevalsky, N. M. (1879). From Kulja, across the Tian Shan to Lob-Nor: Including notices of the lakes of Central Asia (E. D. Morgan, Trans.). Sampson Low, Marston, Searle, & Rivington.
- Shaw, R. (1871). Visits to High Tartary, Yârkand, and Kâshghar (formerly Chinese Tartary), and return journey over the Karakoram Pass. John Murray.
- Skrine, C. P. (1926). Chinese Central Asia. Methuen.
- Stein, M. A. (1903). Sand-buried ruins of Khotan: Personal narrative of a journey of archaeological and geographical exploration in Chinese Turkestan. T. Fisher Unwin.
- Stein, M. A. (1907). Ancient Khotan: Detailed report of archaeological explorations in Chinese Turkestan (Vols. 1–2). Clarendon Press.
- Stein, M. A. (1912). Ruins of desert Cathay: Personal narrative of explorations in Central Asia and westernmost China (Vols. 1–2). Macmillan.
- Sykes, E., & Sykes, P. (1920). Through deserts and oases of Central Asia. Macmillan.
- Teichman, E. (1937). Journey to Turkistan. Hodder & Stoughton.

=== Documents ===
- Allen-Ebrahimian, B. (2019, November 24). Exposed: China's operating manuals for mass internment and arrest by algorithm. International Consortium of Investigative Journalists. https://www.icij.org/investigations/china-cables/exposed-chinas-operating-manuals-for-mass-internment-and-arrest-by-algorithm/
- Committee on the Elimination of Racial Discrimination. (2018, September 19). Concluding observations on the combined fourteenth to seventeenth periodic reports of China (including Hong Kong, China and Macao, China) (CERD/C/CHN/CO/14-17). United Nations.
- Office of the United Nations High Commissioner for Human Rights. (2022, August 31). OHCHR assessment of human rights concerns in the Xinjiang Uyghur Autonomous Region, People's Republic of China. https://www.ohchr.org/en/documents/country-reports/ohchr-assessment-human-rights-concerns-xinjiang-uyghur-autonomous-region
- Ramzy, A., & Buckley, C. (2019, November 16). 'Absolutely no mercy': Leaked files expose how China organized mass detentions of Muslims. The New York Times. https://www.nytimes.com/interactive/2019/11/16/world/asia/china-xinjiang-documents.html
- State Council Information Office of the People's Republic of China. (2019a, March 18). The fight against terrorism and extremism and human rights protection in Xinjiang. https://english.www.gov.cn/archive/whitepaper/201903/18/content_WS5d16cd9dc6d03ce6787953bd.html
- State Council Information Office of the People's Republic of China. (2019b, July 21). Historical matters concerning Xinjiang. https://english.www.gov.cn/archive/whitepaper/201907/21/content_WS5d33fed5c6d00d362f668a0a.html
- State Council Information Office of the People's Republic of China. (2019c, August 17). Vocational education and training in Xinjiang. https://english.www.gov.cn/archive/whitepaper/201908/17/content_WS5d57573cc6d0c6695ff7ed6c.html
- State Council Information Office of the People's Republic of China. (2020, September 17). Employment and labor rights in Xinjiang. https://english.www.gov.cn/archive/whitepaper/202009/17/content_WS5f62cef6c6d0f7257693c192.html
- State Council Information Office of the People's Republic of China. (2021, September 26). Xinjiang population dynamics and data. https://english.www.gov.cn/archive/whitepaper/202109/26/content_WS615016cfc6d0df57f98e0e16.html
- Uyghur Tribunal. (2021, December 9). Uyghur Tribunal judgment. https://uyghurtribunal.com/wp-content/uploads/2022/09/UYGHUR-TRIBUNAL-Judgment-2022.09.20.pdf
- Victims of Communism Memorial Foundation. (2022, May 24). The Xinjiang Police Files. https://xinjiangpolicefiles.org/
- Zenz, A. (2020). The Karakax list: Dissecting the anatomy of Beijing's internment drive in Xinjiang. Journal of Political Risk, 8(2). https://www.jpolrisk.com/karakax/
- Zenz, A. (2022). The Xinjiang Police Files: Re-education camp security and political paranoia in the Xinjiang Uyghur Autonomous Region. Journal of the European Association for Chinese Studies, 3, 263–311. doi:10.25365/jeacs.2022.3.zenz

== See also ==
- Bibliography of Chinese history
- East Turkestan
- First East Turkestan Republic
- History of Xinjiang
- Persecution of Uyghurs in China
- Qocho
- Second East Turkestan Republic
- Transnational repression by China
- Uyghur Khaganate
- Uyghur language
- Uyghur literature
- Uyghur nationalism
- Uyghurs
- Xinjiang conflict
- Xinjiang re-education camp
- Xinjiang Production and Construction Corps
- Yettishar
