= Uyghur literature =

Literary works written in the Uyghur language

Uyghur or Uighur literature comprises oral compositions and written texts in the Uyghur language, a Turkic language used primarily by the Uyghur people in the Xinjiang Uyghur Autonomous Region of the People's Republic of China.

Uyghur writing system observed significant changes by its native writers who switched from Turkic script to Arabic that originally began in the 10th century until the 12th century. This development adopted language reforms from Arabic literature. Yūsuf Balasaguni, Mahmud al-Kashgari, Ahmad Yugnaki, and Ahmad Yasawi were among the leading writers of that time who flourished Uyghur literature by adopting language reforms. Also, Ahmad Yasawi one of the other writers who introduced new genre in Uyghur literature. Yesevi's poetry collection Divan-i hikmet (Book of Wisdom) is composed of various dialects, such as Arabic and Persian, which features Turkic metre.

== History ==
The modern Uyghur language is a Karluk language from the Turkic language family. It is not descended from Old Uyghur.

From the late 15th century, the Chagatai language became the dominant literary language of Central Asia. Chagatai is sometimes referred to as ‘ancient Uyghur’ in China.

Poetry has been especially important in the history of Uyghur literature, and writers of the Uyghur diaspora are attempting to keep traditions alive despite the efforts of the Chinese government to undermine Uyghur culture.

== Access to Uyghur literature in Xinjiang ==
In 2019, the Financial Times published an article stating that the only Uyghur-language book available at the state-run Xinhua Bookstore chain in Xinjiang was CCP general secretary Xi Jinping’s work The Governance of China. In 2020, The Guardian reported that Uyghur poetry was on the verge on extinction in Xinjiang due to the Chinese Communist Party (CCP) and the Chinese government detaining poets and imposing the use of Mandarin.

== See also ==
- Bible translations into Uyghur
