= Bible translations into Uyghur =

Translations of the Bible into the Uyghur language

The earliest known Christian texts in Old Uyghur are known from manuscript fragments uncovered in the Turfan oasis. There are approximately fifty fragments written in Old Uyghur. An early Uyghur translation of the New Testament and the Psalms may have been done in the 14th century by Giovanni da Montecorvino, papal envoy to the Mongols who became Roman Catholic archbishop of Khanbaliq in 1307.

The first modern translation into the Uyghur language—which is a cousin and not a descendant of Old Uyghur—began in the late 19th century, when Johannes Avetaranian, a Turk working with the Swedish Missionary Society, translated the New Testament into Uyghur. He first translated Matthew's gospel, which was completed in 1894. This was revised by Georg Sauerwein, this revision was examined by Lars Erik Högberg and Avetaranian who continued working on the other gospels. The gospels were published in 1898 by the British and Foreign Bible Society in Leipzig. Avetaranian had translated the whole New Testament, but, being dissatisfied with some of Suerwein's revisions could not get the British and Foreign Bible Society to print it all at once. He left Xinjiang, thinking it would be temporary, but never returned. Avetaranian revised his Gospels, and in 1911, along with Acts they were published by the German Orient Mission, in Plovdiv, Bulgaria. Gustaf Raquette, also with the Swedish Missionary Society, came to Plovdiv, Bulgaria, and worked together with Avetaranian on a revision of the New Testament translation. This revision was published by the British and Foreign Bible Society in 1914.

Selections from the Old Testament, translated by Avetaranian was published in Bulgaria in 1907. It is a small booklet though, and it is unclear how much/if he translated any more than that.

Genesis in 1917, Job in 1921, and Psalms in 1923 were translated by other members of the Swedish Missionary Society, especially Oscar Andersson. The British and Foreign Bible Society also printed a revision of the New Testament, by Lars Erik Hogberg and G. Sauerwein in Cairo, in 1939.

George Hunter, of the China Inland Mission in Urumqi, translated Mark, published in 1920 by the Shanghai branch of the British and Foreign Bible Society, and Acts, published by them in 1922. 1 Samuel (a tentative edition) was published in Urumqi in 1917.

After the Swedes had been exiled from Xinjiang, Gustaf Ahlbert, Oskar Hermannson, Dr. Nur Luke (a Uyghur), Moulvi Munshi, and Moulvi Fazil, completed the translation of the Uyghur Bible in India. This, and a revision of the New Testament, was published by the British and Foreign Bible Society in 1950, in Cairo.

The reformation of the Uyghur Arabic alphabet in the 1930s-1950s, as well as a standardizing of Modern Uyghur based on northern dialects caused the translations done by the Swedish missionaries to be quite difficult to read.

The Uyghur Bible Society has published a complete new translation New Testament and portions of the Old Testament into modern Uyghur. The whole Bible has now been completed and published online, though not yet in a hardcopy format.

Another translation into modern Uyghur is the "Mukaddes Kalam" translation.

DunyaningNuri also produced in 2013 a version of the Cairo Bible revised and updated into modern Uyghur.

== Text examples of John 3:16 ==
Translation	John 3:16
British and Foreign Bible Society, 1898	چونكە خدا دنياغە شونداغ محبت كورساتّى كە اوز يالغوز اوغلى نى بردى تاكە ھر كىم انكا ايشانسە ھلاك بولماى انينك ابدى تيريكليكى بولغاى.
British and Foreign Bible Society, 1898 (modern spelling)	چۈنكى خۇدا دۇنياغا شۇنداق مۇھەببەت كۆرسەتتىكى، ئۆز يالغۇز ئوغلىنى بەردى، تاكى ھەر كىم ئۇڭا ئىشەنسە ھالاك بولماي، ئۇنىڭ ئەبەدىي تىرىكلىكى بولغاي.
British and Foreign Bible Society, 1939	چونكه خدا دنيانى شونداغ دوست توتّيكه اوز يالغوز اولغلىنى بردى تاكه هركيم انگا ايشانسہ هلاك بولماغاي بلکه انينك ابدی تيريگليکی بولغای.
Uyghur Bible Society, 2005	چۈنكى خۇدا دۇنيادىكى ئىنسانلارنى شۇ قەدەر سۆيدۇكى، ئۆزىنىڭ بىردىنبىر يىلگانە ئوغلىغا ئېتىقاد قىلغان ھەربىر كىشى ھالاك بولماي، مەڭگۈلۈك ھاياتقا ئېرىشىشى ئۈچۈن، ئۇنى قوربان بولۇشقا ئەۋەتىپ بەردى.
DunyaningNuri, 2013, Kashgar	چۈنكى خۇدا دۇنيانى شۇنداق دوست تۇتتىكى، ھەركىم ئۇنىڭغا ئىشەنسە، ھاالك بولمىغاي، بەلكى ئۇنىڭ ئەبەدىي تىرىكلىكى بولغاي دەپ، ئۆز يالغۇز ئوغلىنى بەردى.
Mukaddes Kalam	چۈنكى خۇدا دۇنيادىكى ئىنسانالرنى شۇ قەدەر سۆيىدۇكى ئۆزىنىڭ بىردىنبىر يېگانە ئوغلىنى پىدا بولۇشقا بەردى. مەقسىتى، ئۇنىڭغا ئېتىقاد قىلغان ھەربىرىنىڭ ھاالك بولماي، مەڭگۈلۈك ھاياتقا ئېرىشىشى ئۈچۈندۇر.

== Jehovah Witnesses Translations ==
On September 8, 2024 Jehovah's Witnesses released the Good News According to Matthew at a special meeting held at the Almaty Branch Office of Jehovah's Witnesses. At the special meeting The Bible book of Matthew both in the Uyghur Arabic and Cyrillic scripts were released simultaneously. The special meeting was held in the Uyghur language with an attendance of 483.

Translation	The Good News According to Matthew 5:10-12
Jehovah's Witnesses. Muqeddes Kitab. 2024 Yengi Dunya Terjimisi	10 ئادالە‌ت ئۈچۈن زىيانكە‌شلىككە ئۇ‌چرىغانلار نە‌قە‌دە‌ر بە‌ختلىك! چۈنكى، خۇ‌دا پادىشاھلىقى ئۇ‌لارنىڭدۇ‌ر. 11 مە‌ن ئۈچۈن كىشىلە‌رنىڭ ھاقارىتى، زىيانكە‌شلىكى ۋە تۈرلۈك يالغان-ياۋىداق تۆھمە‌تلىرىگە ئۇ‌چرىساڭلار، نە‌قە‌دە‌ر بە‌ختلىكسىلە‌ر! 12 خۇ‌شال بولۇ‌پ، شاد-خۇ‌راملىققا چۆمۈڭلار، چۈنكى ئاسماندا سىلە‌رنى زور مۇ‌كاپات كۈتىۋاتىدۇ. ئۇ‌لار سىلە‌ردىن ئىلگىرى كە‌لگە‌ن پە‌يغە‌مبە‌رلە‌رگىمۇ شۇ‌نداق زىيانكە‌شلىك قىلغان.
Jehovah's Witnesses. Muqeddes Kitab. 2024 Yengi Dunya Terjimisi	10 Адаләт үчүн зиянкәшликкә учриғанлар нәқәдәр бәхитлик! Чүнки Худа Падишалиғи уларниңдур. 11 Мән үчүн кишиләрниң һақарити, зиянкәшлиги вә түрлүк ялған-явдақ төһмәтлиригә учрисаңлар, нәқәдәр бәхитликсиләр! 12 Хошал болуп, шат-хорамлиққа чөмүңлар, чүнки асманда силәрни зор мукапат күтиватиду. Улар силәрдин илгири кәлгән пәйғәмбәрләргиму шундақ зиянкәшлик қилған.
