= Mathilda Högberg =

Swedish social media influencer (born 1994)

- Born: 14 April 1994 (age 32); Gothenburg, Västra Götaland County, Sweden
- Occupation: social media influencer

Instagram information
- Page: Mathilda Högberg
- Followers: 309 K

TikTok information
- Page: mathildahogbergs
- Followers: 249.8K
- Last updated: 28 September 2026

Mathilda Högberg (born 14 April 1994) is a Swedish social media influencer. She publicly came out as a transgender woman in 2020.

== Early life ==
Högberg was born in 1994 and grew up in a small town outside of Gothenburg. She came out as a transgender woman to her parents when she was fifteen years old. Her family contacted the Swedish Health Services to begin her gender transition and, over a three-year period, saw seven psychologists, two sociologists, and three doctors before she was approved for receiving gender affirming care, including gender-affirming surgery. She also legally transitioned from male to female.

== Career ==
Högberg is a social media influencer. She amassed a following of hundreds of thousands of people on Instagram, YouTube, TikTok, Snapchat, and X. She began her career by making travel blogs. She also gives reviews for beauty products.

In 2020, she came out publicly as a transgender woman in a YouTube video for her followers.

== Personal life ==
Högberg has a boyfriend, Christian, whom she posts in some of her social media content.
