= Lars Erik Högberg =

Swedish missionary (1858–1924)

Högberg, Lars Erik
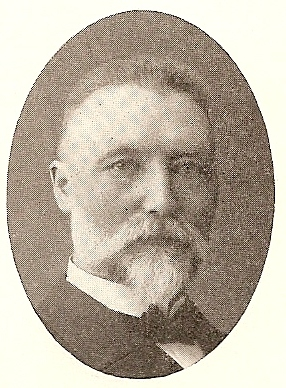
- Missionary to East Turkestan
- Born: 18 December 1858; Nora Mountain Parish, Örebro County, Sweden
- Died: 1924 (aged 65–66)
- Spouse(s): Eva Eriksson, Sigrid Johanna Adelaide Braune

Lars Erik Högberg (18 December 1858 – 1924) was a missionary and linguist in Russia, Persia and Chinese Turkestan (present-day Xinjiang). He served with the Mission Union of Sweden.

He first served in Russia in August 1880 and went to Chinese Turkestan first on 3 May 1894. In 1897 he visited the archaeological site of Yotkan, the ancient capital of the Kingdom of Khotan. There is a collection at the Museum of Ethnography, Stockholm, from this visit.

His first wife, Eva Eriksson, whom he married on 15 August 1882, died on 3 August 1892 of cholera in Tabriz, Iran. On 26 March 1894, he married a second time, to Sigrid Johanna Adelaide Braune.

== Bibliography ==
- Högberg, L. E., Ett och annat från Kinesiska Turkestan, Stockholm: Svenska missionsförbundet, 1907
- Högberg, L. E., Jolbas. En kaschgargosses levnad skildrad av honom själv, Stockholm 1913, 2. ed. 1918.
- Högberg, L. E., The Way of Life in turkish, Kashgar S M S Mission Press 1914
- Högberg, L. E., Läkaremissionen i Kaschgar 1905, in Hälsovännen N:o 13, 1 Juli 1917 - Läkaremission: I.
- Högberg, L. E., Ruts besök i Ost-Turkestan, Stockholm 1919.
- Högberg, L. E., När man börjar. Några erfarenheter vid uppförande av en ny missionsstation i Ost-Turkestan, Stockholm 1919
- Högberg, L. E., Bland Persiens Muhammedaner: minnen och hågkomster från Svenska missionsförbundets arbete i Persien, Stockholm : Svenska missionsförbundet, 1920.
- Högberg, L. E., Kultur-och missionsarbete: Ost-Turkestan, Göteborg: Wald. Zachrissons Boktryckeri A.-B., 1925.
- Högberg, L. E., Islam och evangeliet; muhammedanmissionens vänner..., Stockholm, Svenska missionsförbundets förlag [1925]
