= Bibliography of the Cold War =

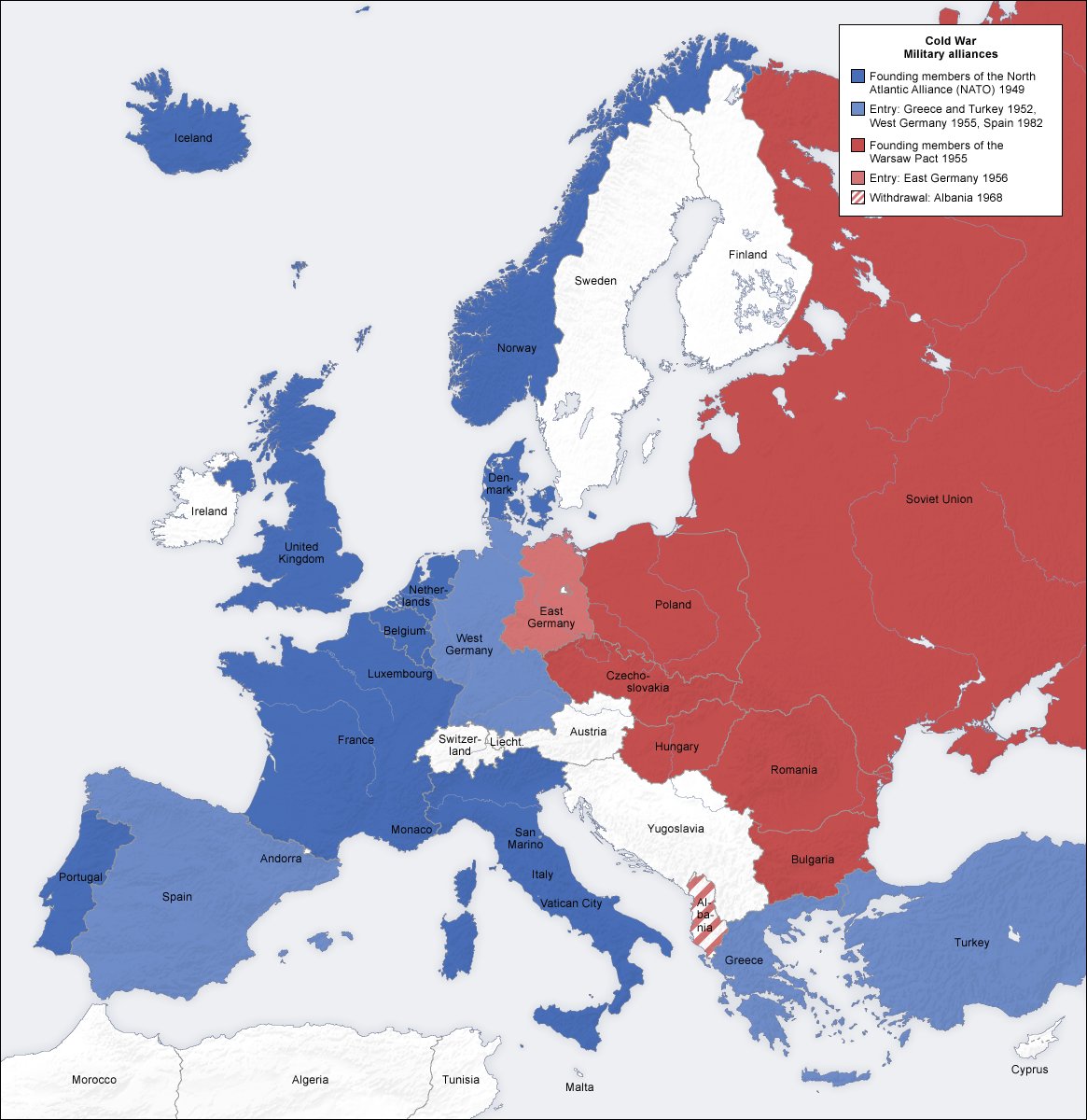
Cold War European Military Alliances

This is an English language bibliography of scholarly books and articles on the Cold War. Because of the extent of the Cold War (in terms of time and scope), the conflict is well documented.

The Cold War (Russian: холо́дная война́, holodnaya voĭna) was the global situation from around 1947 to 1991 of political conflict, military tension, proxy wars, and propaganda campaigns between the Communist World — primarily the Soviet Union and China and their satellite states and allies — and the powers of the Western world, primarily the United States and its NATO allies.

== Overviews ==
- Ball, S. J. The Cold War: An International History, 1947–1991 (1998), British perspective; short summary
- Boyle Peter G. American-Soviet Relations: From the Russian Revolution to the Fall of Communism. 1993.
- The Cambridge History of the Cold War (3 vol. 2010) online Archived 2016-08-20 at the Wayback Machine
  - Leffler, Melvyn P. and Odd Arne Westad, eds. The Cambridge History of the Cold War: Volume 1, Origins (2015) 23 essays by leading scholars. excerpt
- Clarke, Bob. Four Minute Warning: Britain's Cold War (2005)
- Crockatt Richard. The Fifty Years War: The United States and the Soviet Union in World Politics, 1941–1991. (1995). popular history
- Davis, Simon, and Joseph Smith. The A to Z of the Cold War (Scarecrow, 2005), encyclopedia focused on military aspects
- Friedman, Norman. The Fifty Year War: Conflict and Strategy in the Cold War. (2000)
- Gaddis, John Lewis. The Cold War: A New History (2005), basic summary;
- Gaddis, John Lewis. Russia, the Soviet Union and the United States. An Interpretative History 2nd ed. (1990)
- Gaddis, John Lewis. Long Peace: Inquiries into the History of the Cold War (1987)
- Gaddis, John Lewis. Strategies of Containment: A Critical Appraisal of Postwar American National Security Policy (1982)
- Garthoff, Raymond (1994). Détente and Confrontation: American-Soviet Relations from Nixon to Reagan. Brookings Institution Press. ISBN 0-8157-3041-1. online free to borrow
- Hoffman, David E. The Dead Hand: The Untold Story of the Cold War Arms Race and Its Dangerous Legacy (2010)
- House, Jonathan. A Military History of the Cold War, 1944-1962 (2012) excerpt and text search
- Immerman, Richard H. and Petra Goedde, eds. The Oxford Handbook of the Cold War (2013) excerpt
- LaFeber, Walter (2002). America, Russia, and the Cold War, 1945-2002. McGraw-Hill. ISBN 0-07-284903-7.
- Leffler, Melvyn (1992). A Preponderance of Power: National Security, the Truman Administration, and the Cold War. Stanford University Press. ISBN 0-8047-2218-8.
- Leffler, Melvyn P. and Odd Arne Westad, eds. The Cambridge History of the Cold War (3 vol, 2010) 2000pp; new essays by leading scholars
- Lundestad, Geir (2005). East, West, North, South: Major Developments in International Politics since 1945. Oxford University Press. ISBN 1-4129-0748-9.
- Lüthi, Lorenz M (2008). The Sino-Soviet split: Cold War in the communist world. Princeton University Press. ISBN 978-0-691-13590-8.
- Lüthi, Lorenz M. (2020). Cold Wars: Asia, the Middle East, Europe. Cambridge University Press. ISBN 9781108289825.
- McMahon, Robert (2003). The Cold War: A Very Short Introduction. Oxford University Press. ISBN 0-19-280178-3.
- Mastny, Vojtech. The Cold War and Soviet insecurity: the Stalin years (1996) online edition
- Mitchell, George. The Iron Curtain: The Cold War in Europe (2004)
- Njolstad, Olav (2004). The Last Decade of the Cold War. Routledge. ISBN 0-7146-8371-X.
- Muschik, Alexander. Headed towards the West: Swedish Neutrality and the German Question, 1945–1972, in: Contemporary European History, 15, 4 (2006), pp. 519–538.
- Paterson, Thomas G. Meeting the Communist Threat: Truman to Reagan (1988)
- Roberts, Geoffrey (2006). Stalin's Wars: From World War to Cold War, 1939–1953. Yale University Press. ISBN 0-300-11204-1.
- Sivachev, Nikolai and Nikolai Yakolev, Russia and the United States (1979), by Soviet historians
- Stone, Norman. The Atlantic and Its Enemies: A History of the Cold War (2010); by leading military historian
- Taubman, William (2004). Khrushchev: The Man and His Era. W. W. Norton & Company. ISBN 0-393-32484-2.; Pulitzer Prize
- Tucker, Spencer, ed. Encyclopedia of the Cold War: A Political, Social, and Military History (5 vol. 2008), world coverage
- Walker, Martin. The Cold War: A History (1995), British perspective
- Wettig, Gerhard (2008). Stalin and the Cold War in Europe. Rowman & Littlefield. ISBN 978-0-7425-5542-6.
- Westad, Odd Arne The Global Cold War: Third World Interventions and the Making of our Times (2006)
- Zubok, Vladislav M. A Failed Empire: The Soviet Union in the Cold War from Stalin to Gorbachev (2008)

== National perspectives ==
=== USSR ===
- Brzezinski, Zbigniew. The Grand Failure: The Birth and Death of Communism in the Twentieth Century (1989)
- Catchpole, Brian. A Map History of Russia (1974), pp 79–117
- Edmonds, Robin. Soviet Foreign Policy: The Brezhnev Years (1983)
- Frankel, Benjamin. The Cold War 1945–1991. Vol. 2, Leaders and other important figures in the Soviet Union, Eastern Europe, China, and the Third World (1992), 379pp of biographies.
- Friedman, Jeremy. Shadow Cold War: The Sino-Soviet Competition for the Third World (2015)
- Gilbert, Martin. Routledge Atlas of Russian History (4th ed. 2007) excerpt and text search
- Goncharov, Sergei, John Lewis and Litai Xue, Uncertain Partners: Stalin, Mao and the Korean War (1993)
- Gorlizki, Yoram, and Oleg Khlevniuk. Cold Peace: Stalin and the Soviet Ruling Circle, 1945-1953 (2004)
- Harrison, Hope Millard (2003). Driving the Soviets Up the Wall: Soviet-East German Relations, 1953-1961. Princeton University Press. ISBN 0-691-09678-3.
- Haslam, Jonathan. Russia's Cold War: From the October Revolution to the Fall of the Wall (Yale University Press; 2011) 512 pages
- Mastny, Vojtech. Russia's Road to the Cold War: Diplomacy, Warfare, and the Politics of Communism, 1941–1945 (1979)
- Mastny, Vojtech. The Cold War and Soviet Insecurity: The Stalin Years (1998) online edition from ACLS E-Books
- Nation, R. Craig. Black Earth, Red Star: A History of Soviet Security Policy, 1917-1991 (1992)
- Roberts, Geoffrey. Stalin's Wars: From World War to Cold War, 1939-1953 (2007) 468pp
- Sivachev, Nikolai and Nikolai Yakolev, Russia and the United States (1979), by Soviet historians
- Taubman, William. Khrushchev: The Man and His Era (2004), Pulitzer Prize;
- Ulam, Adam B. Expansion and Coexistence: Soviet Foreign Policy, 1917–1973, 2nd ed. (1974)
- Wettig, Gerhard. Stalin and the Cold War in Europe: The Emergence & Development of East-West Conflict, 1939-1953 (2008) 285p
- Zubok, Vladislav M. Inside the Kremlin's Cold War (1996)
- Zubok, Vladislav M. A Failed Empire: The Soviet Union in the Cold War from Stalin to Gorbachev (2007)

=== United States ===
- Bacevich, Andrew J., ed. The Long War: A New History of U.S. National Security Policy Since World War II (2007)
- Cummings, Richard H. Radio Free Europe's Crusade for Freedom: Rallying Americans Behind Cold War Broadcasting 1950-1960 (2010)
- Dudziak, Mary L. Cold War civil rights: Race and the image of American democracy (Princeton UP, 2011).
- Fernlund, Kevin Jon, ed. The Cold War American West, 1945-1989. University of New Mexico Press, 1998. 222 pp.
- Gaddis, John Lewis. Strategies of Containment: A Critical Appraisal of Postwar American National Security Policy (1982)
- Gaddis, John Lewis. George F. Kennan: An American Life (2011).
- Hogan, Michael J. America in the World: The Historiography of US Foreign Relations since 1941 (1996), scholarly articles reprinted from the journal Diplomatic History
- Leffler, Melvyn P. For the Soul of Mankind: The United States, the Soviet Union, and the Cold War (2007)
- Lewis, Adrian R. The American Culture of War: The History of U.S. Military Force from World War II to Operation Iraqi Freedom (2006)
- Offner, Arnold A. Another Such Victory: President Truman and the Cold War, 1945-1953 . Stanford UP, 2002).
- Paterson, Thomas G. Meeting the Communist Threat: Truman to Reagan (1988), liberal interpretation
- Roark, James L. "American Black Leaders: The Response to Colonialism and the Cold War, 1943–1953." African Historical Studies 4.2 (1971): 253–270.

=== Britain ===
- Anderson Terry H. The United States, Great Britain, and the Cold War, 1944–1947. (1981)
- Bullock, Alan. Ernest Bevin: Foreign Secretary, 1945–1951. 1983; he set British policy
- Clarke, Bob. Four Minute Warning: Britain's Cold War (2005)
- Clarke, Bob. Britain's Cold War: The Dangerous Decades An Illustrated History (2014) 128pp
- Deighton Anne. "The 'Frozen Front': The Labour Government, the Division of Germany and the Origins of the Cold War, 1945–1947," International Affairs 65, 1987: 449–465. in JSTOR
- Keeble, Curtis. Britain and the Soviet Union, 1917-89 (1990).
- Northedge, F.S. Descent From Power British Foreign Policy 1945-1973 (1974) online
- Taylor, Peter J. Britain and the Cold War: 1945 as geopolitical transition (1993).
- Young, John W. Winston Churchill's Last Campaign: Britain and the Cold War, 1951-5 Clarendon Press, 1996

=== Europe ===
- Allen, Debra J. The Oder-Neisse Line: The United States, Poland, and Germany in the Cold War (2003) 309 pp.
- Borhi, László. Hungary in the Cold War, 1945-1956 (2004) 352 pages
- Clemens, Clay. Reluctant Realists: The Christian Democrats and West German Ostpolitik, Duke University Press, 1989
- Crace, Sylvia E. and John O. Crane. Czechoslovakia: Anvil of the Cold War, 1991
- Judt, Tony. Postwar: A History of Europe Since 1945, (2005)
- Lewkowicz, Nicolas (2018) The United States, the Soviet Union and the Geopolitical Implications of the Origins of the Cold War, Anthem Press, London
- Lewkowicz, Nicolas (2018), The Role of Ideology in the Origins of the Cold War, Scholar's Press, ISBN 978-620-2-31726-9
- Lewkowicz, Nicolas (2010), The German Question and the International Order,1943-48, Palgrave Macmillan, ISBN 978-0-230-24812-0
- Lewkowicz, Nicolas (2008), The German Question and the Origins of the Cold War, IPOC, ISBN 978-88-95145-27-3
- Naimark, Norman, and Leonid Gibianskii. Establishment of Communist Regimes in Eastern Europe, 1944-1949 (1998)
- Ninkovich, Frank. Germany and the United States: The Transformation of the German Question since 1945 (1988)
- Nolte, Ernst. Deutschland und der kalte Krieg (lit. 'Germany and the Cold War') (1974)
- Sarotte, M.E. Dealing with the Devil: East Germany, Détente & Ostpolitik, 1969-73 The University of North Carolina Press, (2001)
- Soutou, Georges-Henri. "France and the Cold War, 1944–63." Diplomacy & Statecraft. (2001) 12#4 pp 3–52.
- Turner, Henry Ashby. Germany from Partition to Reunification (1992)
- Wall, Irwin. "France in the Cold War" Journal of European Studies (2008) 38#2 pp 121–139.

=== Latin America ===
- Alegre, Robert F. Railroad radicals in Cold War Mexico: Gender, class, and memory. Lincoln: University of Nebraska Press, 2013
- Berger, Mark T.,Under Northern eyes: Latin American studies and U.S. hegemony in the Americas, 1898-1990. Bloomington: Indiana University Press, 1995.
- Brands, Hal, Latin America's Cold War. Cambridge, Mass.: Harvard University Press, 2010.
- Cohn, Deborah N., The Latin American literary boom and U.S. nationalism during the Cold War. Nashville: Vanderbilt University Press, 2012.
- Crandall, Russell, The United States and Latin America after the Cold War. Cambridge; New York : Cambridge University Press, 2008.
- Darnton, Christopher Neil, Rivalry and alliance politics in cold war Latin America. Baltimore: The Johns Hopkins University Press, 2014
- Esparza, Marcia, et al., eds. State violence and genocide in Latin America : the Cold War years. London; New York : Routledge, 2010.
- Fox, Claire F. Making Art Panamerican : Cultural Policy and the Cold War. Minneapolis : University of Minnesota Press, 2013
- Grandin, Greg, The last colonial massacre: Latin America in the Cold War. Chicago : University of Chicago Press, 2004.
- Grow, Michael. U.S. presidents and Latin American interventions: Pursuing regime change in the Cold War. Lawrence, Kan. : University Press of Kansas, 2008.
- Harmer, Tanya. Allende's Chile and the Inter-American Cold War. Chapel Hill : University of North Carolina Press, c2011.
- Iber, Patrick, Neither peace nor freedom: The cultural Cold War in Latin America. Cambridge: Harvard University Press 2015.
- Joseph, Gilbert M., et al. eds. Close encounters of empire: writing the cultural history of U.S.-Latin American relations. Durham [N.C.] : Duke University Press, 1998.
- Joseph, Gilbert M. and Daniela Spenser. In from the cold : Latin America's new encounter with the Cold War. Durham : Duke University Press, 2008.
- Klein, Herbert & Luna, Francisco. Brazil, 1964-1985: The Military Regimes of Latin America in the Cold War (Yale-Hoover Series on Authoritarian Regimes). Yale University Press, 2017.
- McSherry, J. Patrice. Predatory states: Operation Condor and covert war in Latin America. Lanham, MD : Rowman & Littlefield Publishers, Inc., 2005.
- Pettinà, Vanni. A Compact History of Latin America’s Cold War (University of North Carolina Press, 2022) See reviews by 5 scholars and reply by Pettina online
- Pettinà, Vanni. "The shadows of Cold War over Latin America: the US reaction to Fidel Castro's nationalism, 1956–59." Cold War History 11.3 (2011): 317–339.
- Rabe, Stephen G. The killing zone: The United States wages Cold War in Latin America. New York : Oxford University Press, 2012.
- Schmidli, William Michael, The fate of freedom elsewhere: human rights and U.S. Cold War policy toward Argentina. Ithaca : Cornell University Press, 2013.
- Stites, Jessica, ed. Human rights and transnational solidarity in Cold War Latin America. Madison, Wis. : The University of Wisconsin Press, 2013.

=== Asia and Pacific ===
- Goscha, Christopher E. & Ostermann, Christian F. (eds.), Connecting Histories: Decolonization and the Cold War in Southeast Asia, 1945-1962. (Woodrow Wilson Center Press & Stanford University Press, 2009).
- Hara, Kimie. Cold War frontiers in the Asia-Pacific: divided territories in the San Francisco system (Routledge, 2006).
- Hasegawa, Tsuyoshi, The Cold War in East Asia, 1945-1991 (2011)
- Lee, Steven Hugh. Outposts of Empire: Korea, Vietnam, and the Origins of the Cold War in Asia, 1949-1954 (McGill-Queen's University Press; 1996).
- Li, Xiaobing. The Cold War in East Asia (2017) excerpt, textbook
- Lüthi, Lorenz. The Regional Cold Wars in Europe, East Asia, and the Middle East: Crucial Periods and Turning Points (2015).
- Nagai, Yonosuke, and Akira Iriye, eds. The Origins of the Cold War in Asia (1977).
- Robb, Thomas K., and David James Gill. "The ANZUS Treaty during the Cold War: a reinterpretation of US diplomacy in the Southwest Pacific." Journal of Cold War Studies 17.4 (2015): 109–157.
- Sanders, Vivienne. The Cold War in Asia 1945-93 (2015), textbook
- Vu, Tuong & Wasana Wongsurawat (eds.), Dynamics of the Cold War in Asia: Ideology, Identity, and Culture (New York: Palgrave MacMillan, 2009).
- Zheng Yangwen, Liu, Hong, & Szonyi, Michael (eds.). The Cold War in Asia: The Battle for Hearts and Minds. (Leiden: Brill, 2010).

==== India ====
- Chaudhuri, Rudra. Forged in crisis: India and the United States since 1947 (Oxford UP, 2014).
- Donaldson, Robert H. "The Soviet Union in South Asia: A Friend To Rely On?" Journal of International Affairs (1981) 34#2 pp 235–58
- Duncan, Peter J. S. The Soviet Union and India (1989)
- Harder, Anton. "Defining independence in Cold War Asia: Sino-Indian relations, 1949–1962." (PhD Diss. The London School of Economics and Political Science (LSE), 2015.) online
- Horn, Robert C. Soviet-Indian Relations (1982)
- Mastny, Vojtech. "The Soviet Union's Partnership with India." Journal of Cold War Studies (2010) 12#3 pp 50–90.
- Pandey, Sanjay Kumar, and Ankur Yadav. "Contextualizing India–Russia Relations." International Studies 53.3-4 (2016): 227–257.
- Thakur, Ramesh and Carlyle A. Thayer, eds. Soviet Relations with India and Vietnam, 1945–1992 (1992).
- Touhey, Ryan. Conflicting Visions: Canada and India in the Cold War World, 1946–76. (UBC Press, 2015).

==== China and Taiwan ====
- Brazinsky, Gregg A. Winning the Third World: Sino-American Rivalry during the Cold War (U of North Carolina Press, 2017); four online reviews & author response
- Fardella, Enrico. "A significant periphery of the Cold War: Italy-China bilateral relations, 1949–1989." Cold War History 17.2 (2017): 181–197.
- Frankel, Benjamin. The Cold War 1945–1991. Vol. 2, Leaders and other important figures in the Soviet Union, Eastern Europe, China, and the Third World (1992), 379pp of biographies.
- Friedman, Jeremy. Shadow Cold War: The Sino-Soviet Competition for the Third World (2015). online
- Goncharov, Sergei, John Lewis and Litai Xue, Uncertain Partners: Stalin, Mao and the Korean War (1993)
- Jian, Chen. China's Road to the Korean War: Making of the Sino-American Confrontation (2004)
- Jian, Chen. Mao's China and the Cold War (2001)
- Kaufman, Victor S. Confronting Communism: U.S. and British Policies toward China (2001) e]
- Lüthi, Lorenz M. The Sino-Soviet Split: Cold War in the Communist World (2008)
- Mark, Chi-Kwan. China and the world since 1945: an international history (Routledge, 2011)
- Mehnert, Klaus. "Soviet-Chinese Relations." International Affairs 35.4 (1959): 417–426. online
- Olsen, Mari. Soviet-Vietnam Relations and the Role of China 1949-64: Changing Alliances (Routledge, 2007)
- Roberts, Priscilla. "New Perspectives on Cold War History from China," Diplomatic History 41:2 (April 2017) online
- Ross, Robert S. Negotiating Cooperation: The United States and China, 1969–1989, (1995)
- Ross, Robert S., ed. China, the United States, and the Soviet Union: Tripolarity and Policy Making in the Cold War (1993)
- Scalapino, Robert A (1964). "Sino-Soviet Competition in Africa". Foreign Affairs. 42 (4): 640–654. doi:10.2307/20029719. JSTOR 20029719.
- Taylor, Jay. The Generalissimo: Chiang Kai-shek and the Struggle for Modern China (2011)
- Vogel, Ezra F. Deng Xiaoping and the Transformation of China (2011), full-scale biography
- Westad, Odd Arne, ed. Brothers in arms: the rise and fall of the Sino-Soviet alliance, 1945-1963 (Stanford University Press, 1998)

==== Vietnam ====
- Lawrence, Mark Atwood; Logevall, Fredrik, eds. (2007). The First Vietnam War: Colonial Conflict and Cold War Crisis. Harvard University Press.
- Lawrence, Mark Atwood, ed. The Vietnam War: An International History in Documents (2014)
- Roberts, Priscilla. Behind the Bamboo Curtain: China, Vietnam, and the Cold War (2006)
- Smith, R.B. An International History of the Vietnam War(2 vol 1985)
- Zhai, Qiang. China and the Vietnam Wars, 1950-1975 (2000)

=== Middle East ===
- Cohen, Michael J. "From ‘Cold’ to ‘Hot’ War: Allied Strategic and Military Interests in the Middle East after the Second World War." Middle Eastern Studies 43.5 (2007): 725–748.
- Jalal, Ayesha. "Towards the Baghdad Pact: South Asia and Middle East Defence in the Cold War, 1947–1955." International History Review 11.3 (1989): 409–433.
- Kuniholm, Bruce R. The origins of the Cold War in the Near East: Great power conflict and diplomacy in Iran, Turkey, and Greece (Princeton UP, 2014)
- Lüthi, Lorenz. The Regional Cold Wars in Europe, East Asia, and the Middle East: Crucial Periods and Turning Points (2015)
- McGhee, George. The US-Turkish-NATO Middle East connection: How the Truman doctrine and Turkey's NATO entry contained the Soviets (Springer, 2016).
- McNabb, James Brian. A Military History of the Modern Middle East (ABC-CLIO, 2017).
- Patten, Howard A. Israel and the Cold War: Diplomacy, Strategy and the Policy of the Periphery at the United Nations (2013)
- Yesilbursa, Behcet Kemal. The Baghdad Pact: Anglo-American Defence Policies in the Middle East, 1950-59 (2003) excerpt.

== Origins: to 1950 ==
- Anderson Terry H. The United States, Great Britain, and the Cold War, 1944–1947. (1981)
- Applebaum, Anne. Iron Curtain: The Crushing of Eastern Europe, 1944-1956 (2012) excerpt and text search
- Bullock Alan. Ernest Bevin: Foreign Secretary, 1945–1951. (1983), on British policy
- Chen Jian, China's Road to the Korean War: Making of the Sino-American Confrontation (2004)
- Clemens Diane Shaver. Yalta. 1970.
- Cumings, Bruce The Origins of the Korean War (2 vols., 1981–90), friendly to North Korea and hostile to US
- Deighton Anne. "The 'Frozen Front': The Labour Government, the Division of Germany and the Origins of the Cold War, 1945–1947," International Affairs 65, 1987: 449–465.
- Gaddis, John Lewis. The United States and the Origins of the Cold War, 1941–1947 (1972)
- Gaddis, John Lewis. George F. Kennan: An American Life (2011)
- Harbutt, Fraser. "The Iron Curtain: Churchill, America, and the Origins of the Cold War" (Oxford University Press, 1988)
- Holloway, David . Stalin and the Bomb: The Soviet Union and Atomic Energy, 1959–1956 (1994)
- Goncharov, Sergei, John Lewis and Xue Litai, Uncertain Partners: Stalin, Mao and the Korean War (1993)
- House, Jonathan M. ‘’A Military History of the Cold War, 1944-1962’’ (University of Oklahoma Press; 2012) 546 pages; scholarly history with special attention to military commanders and political leaders
- Isaacson, Walter, and Evan Thomas. The Wise Men. Six Friends and the World They Made. Acheson, Bohlen, Harriman, Kennan, Lovett, McCloy. 1986.
- Leffler, Melvyn. A Preponderance of Power: National Security, the Truman Administration and the Cold War (1992).
- Mastny, Vojtech. Russia's Road to the Cold War: Diplomacy, Warfare, and the Politics of Communism, 1941–1945 (1979)
- Levering, Ralph, Vladamir Pechatnov, Verena Botzenhart-Viehe, and C. Earl Edmondson. Debating the Origins of the Cold War (2001), Russian and American perspectives
- Yonosuke Nagai and Akira Iriye, eds., The Origins of the Cold War in Asia. 1977
- Trachtenberg, Marc. A Constructed Peace: The Making of the European Settlement, 1945–1963 (1999) (ISBN 0-691-00273-8)

== 1950s and 1960s ==
- Beschloss, Michael. Kennedy v. Khrushchev: The Crisis Years, 1960–63 (1991)
- Beschloss Michael. Mayday: Eisenhower, Kennedy and the U-2 Affair 1986.
- Brands, H. W. Cold Warriors. Eisenhower's Generation and American Foreign Policy (1988).
- Brands, H. W. The Wages of Globalism: Lyndon Johnson and the Limits of American Power (1997)
- Brzezinski, Zbigniew. Soviet Bloc: Unity and Conflict, New York: Praeger (1961), ISBN 0-674-82545-4
- Chen Jian, Mao's China and the Cold War (2001)
- Chernus, Ira, Apocalypse Management: Eisenhower and the Discourse of National Insecurity (2008)
- Cummings, Richard H. "Radio Free Europe's 'Crusade for Freedom': Rallying Americans Behind Cold War Broadcasting, 1950–1960," (2010)
- Divine, Robert A. Eisenhower and the Cold War (1981)
- Divine, Robert A. ed., The Cuban Missile Crisis 2nd ed. (1988)
- Duiker William J. U.S. Containment Policy and the Conflict in Indochina. 1994.
- Freedman, Lawrence. Kennedy's Wars: Berlin, Cuba, Laos, and Vietnam (2000)
- Fursenko, Aleksandr and Timothy Naftali. One Hell of a Gamble: Khrushchev, Castro, and Kennedy, 1958–1964 (1997)
- Granville, Johanna. The First Domino: International Decision Making During the Hungarian Crisis of 1956. (2004)
- House, Jonathan M. A Military History of the Cold War, 1944-1962 (University of Oklahoma Press; 2012) 546 pages; scholarly history with special attention to military commanders and political leaders
- Kunz, Diane B. The Diplomacy of the Crucial Decade: American foreign Relations during the 1960s (1994)
- Navratil, Jaromir. The Prague Spring 68´ (1998)
- Lüthi, Lorenz M. The Sino-Soviet Split: Cold War in the Communist World (2008)
- Mastny, Vojtech. The Cold War and Soviet Insecurity: The Stalin Years (1998)
- Melanson, Richard A. and David Mayers, eds., Reevaluating Eisenhower. American Foreign Policy in the 1950s (1986)
- Paterson, Thomas G. ed., Kennedy's Quest for Victory: American Foreign Policy, 1961–1963 (1989).
- Radchenko, Sergey, Two Suns In the Heavens: The Sino-Soviet Struggle for Supremacy, 1962-1967 (2008)
- Reynolds, David, ed. The Origins of the Cold War in Europe: International Perspectives (1994)
- Stueck, Jr. William W. The Korean War: An International History (1995)
- Vandiver, Frank E. Shadows of Vietnam: Lyndon Johnson's Wars (1997)
- Williams, Kirrian. The Prague Spring and its Aftermath : Czechoslovak Politics, 1968–1970 (1997)

== Detente: 1969–1979 ==
- Edmonds, Robin. Soviet Foreign Policy: The Brezhnev Years (1983)
- Garthoff, Raymond (1994). Détente and Confrontation: American-Soviet Relations from Nixon to Reagan. Brookings Institution Press. ISBN 0-8157-3041-1. online free to borrow
- Isaacson, Walter. Kissinger: A Biography (1992)
- Keefer, Edward C. Harold Brown: Offsetting the Soviet Military Challenge, 1977—1981 (Washington: Historical Office of the Secretary of Defense, 2017), xxii, 815 pp.), about Harold Brown (Secretary of Defense)
- Kissinger, Henry. White House Years (1979) and Years of Upheaval (1982), memoirs
- Nixon, Richard. RN: Memoirs of Richard Nixon (1981)
- Sarrotte, M.E. Dealing with the Devil: East Germany, Détente & Ostpolitik, 1969-73 The University of North Carolina Press, (2001)
- Ulam, Adam B. Dangerous Relations. The Soviet Union in World Politics, 1970–1982 (1983)
- Westad, O. A., The Fall of Détente: Soviet-American Relations During the Carter Years, 1997 (Aschehoug AS) ISBN 82-00-37671-0

== Second Cold War: 1979–1986 ==
- Brzezinski, Zbigniew. Power and Principle: Memoirs of the National Security Adviser, 1977–1981 (1983);
- Edmonds, Robin. Soviet Foreign Policy: The Brezhnev Years (1983)
- Halliday, Fred. The Making of the Second Cold War (1983, Verso, London).
- Mower, A. Glenn Jr. Human Rights and American Foreign Policy: The Carter and Reagan Experiences (1987),
- Smith, Gaddis. Morality, Reason and Power:American Diplomacy in the Carter Years (1986).

== End of Cold War: 1986–1991 ==
- Beschloss, Michael, and Strobe Talbott. At the Highest Levels:The Inside Story of the End of the Cold War (1993)
- Bialer, Seweryn and Michael Mandelbaum, eds. Gorbachev's Russia and American Foreign Policy (1988).
- Gaddis, John Lewis. The United States and the End of the Cold War: Implications, Reconsiderations, Provocations (1992)
- Garthoff, Raymond. The Great Transition:American-Soviet Relations and the End of the Cold War (1994), detailed narrative
- Hogan, Michael ed. The End of the Cold War. Its Meaning and Implications (1992) articles from Diplomatic History online at JSTOR
- Klimke, Martin Alexander, et al., eds. Trust, but Verify: The Politics of Uncertainty and the Transformation of the Cold War Order, 1969-1991 (Stanford University Press, 2016). xiv, 313 pp.
- Kotkin, Stephen. Armageddon Averted: The Soviet Collapse 1970-2000 (2001) ISBN 978-0-19-280245-3
- Kyvig, David ed. Reagan and the World (1990)
- Mann, James. Rebellion of Ronald Reagan: A History of the End of the Cold War (2009) 390p; excerpt and text search
- Matlock, Jack F. Autopsy on an Empire: The American Ambassador's Account of the Collapse of the Soviet Union (1995)
- Matlock, Jack F. Reagan and Gorbachev: How the Cold War Ended (2004)
- Miles, S. Engaging the Evil Empire: Washington, Moscow, and the Beginning of the End of the Cold War'. Ithaca: Cornell University Press, (2020).
- Shultz, George P. Turmoil and Triumph: My Years as Secretary of State (1993)
- Pons, S., Romero, F., Reinterpreting the End of the Cold War: Issues, Interpretations, Periodizations, (2005) (London: Frank Cass) ISBN 0-7146-5695-X (Hardback)
- David Remnick, Lenin's Tomb: The Last Days of the Soviet Empire, Vintage Books, 1994, ISBN 0-679-75125-4
- Wilson, James Graham (2014). The Triumph of Improvisation: Gorbachev's Adaptability, Reagan's Engagement, and the End of the Cold War. Ithaca: Cornell University Press. ISBN 978-0-8014-5229-1. Archived from the original on November 4, 2013.

== Economics and Internal Forces ==
- Heiss, Mary Ann. "The Economic Cold War: America, Britain, and East-West Trade, 1948–63" The Historian, Vol. 65, (2003)
- Hogan, Michael J. The Marshall Plan: America, Britain and the Reconstruction of Western Europe, 1947–1952 (1989)
- Keohane, Robert O. and Joseph S. Nye. Power and Interdependence (3rd Edition) (2000)
- Kunz, Diane B. Butter and Guns: America's Cold War Economic Diplomacy (1997)
- Morgan, Patrick M. and Keith L. Nelson (eds); Re-Viewing the Cold War: Domestic Factors and Foreign Policy in the East-West Confrontation (1997)

== Intelligence/ Espionage ==
- Aldrich, Richard J. The Hidden Hand: Britain, America and Cold War Secret Intelligence (2002).
- Ambrose, Stephen E. Ike's Spies: Eisenhower and the Intelligence Establishment (1981).
- Andrew, Christopher and Vasili Mitrokhin. The Sword and the Shield: The Mitrokhin Archive and the Secret History of the KGB (1999)
  - Mitrokhin. Andrew and Vasili Mitrokhin. The Mitrokhin Archive (1999). vol 1, on KGB
- Andrew, Christopher, and Oleg Gordievsky. KGB: The Inside Story of Its Foreign Operations from Lenin to Gorbachev (1990).
- Blum, William, Killing Hope: U.S. Military and CIA Interventions Since World War II, Common Courage Press (2003)
- Bogle, Lori, ed. Cold War Espionage and Spying (2001), essays
- Cummings, Richard H., Cold War Radio: The Dangerous History of American Broadcasting in Europe, 1950-1989 (2010)
- Dorril, Stephen. MI6: Inside the Covert World of Her Majesty's Secret Intelligence Service (2000).
- Ferris, John. "Coming in from the Cold War: the historiography of American intelligence, 1945–1990." Diplomatic History 19.1 (1995): 87–115. online
- Gates, Robert M. From The Shadows: The Ultimate Insider's Story Of Five Presidents And How They Won The Cold War (1997)
- Haynes, John Earl, and Harvey Klehr. Venona: Decoding Soviet Espionage in America (1999).
- Helms, Richard. A Look over My Shoulder: A Life in the Central Intelligence Agency (2003)
- Koehler, John O. Stasi: The Untold Story of the East German Secret Police (1999)
- Murphy, David E., Sergei A. Kondrashev, and George Bailey. Battleground Berlin: CIA vs. KGB in the Cold War (1997).
- Prados, John. Presidents' Secret Wars: CIA and Pentagon Covert Operations Since World War II (1996)
- Rositzke, Harry. The CIA's Secret Operations: Espionage, Counterespionage, and Covert Action (1988)
- Trahair, Richard C. S. Encyclopedia of Cold War Espionage, Spies and Secret Operations (2004), by an Australian scholar; contains historiographical introduction
- Weinstein, Allen, and Alexander Vassiliev. The Haunted Wood: Soviet Espionage in America—The Stalin Era (1999).

== Naval Aspects ==
- Christopher A. Ford, David A. Rosenberg, Randy Carole Balano, The Admirals' Advantage: U.S. Navy Operational Intelligence in World War II And the Cold War. (Annapolis: Naval Institute Press, 2005).
- The Cold War at sea: an international appraisal, Journal of Strategic Studies, (April 2005). Special issue guest editors: Lyle J. Goldstein, John B. Hattendorf and Yuri M. Zhukov.
- John B. Hattendorf, The Evolution of the U.S. Navy's Maritime Strategy, 1977-1986. Newport Paper, no. 19. (Newport: Naval War College Press, 2005).
- Peter Huchthausen and Alexandre Sheldon-Duplaix.Hide and seek: the untold story of Cold War espionage at sea. (Hoboken, NJ: J. Wiley & Sons, 2008).
- Norman Polmar, Chronology of the Cold War at Sea, 1945-1991. (Annapolis; Naval Institute Press, 1998).
- Sherry Sontag and Christopher Drew, Blind Man's Bluff: The Untold Story of American Submarine Espionage. (New York: Public Affairs, 1998).
- David F. Winkler, Cold War at Sea: High-Seas Confrontation Between the United States and the Soviet Union. (Annapolis; Naval Institute Press, 2000).

== Propaganda, rhetoric, religion, popular culture ==
- Andrews, James T. "Inculcating Materialist Minds: Scientific Propaganda and Anti-Religion in the USSR During the Cold War." in Science, Religion and Communism in Cold War Europe. (Palgrave Macmillan UK, 2016) pp. 105–125.
- Barnhisel, Greg, and Catherine Turner, eds. Pressing the Fight: Print, Propaganda, and the Cold War (2010) 312 pages.
- Belmonte, Laura A. Selling the American Way: US Propaganda and the Cold War (U of Pennsylvania Press, 2013).
- Boyer, Paul S. By the Bomb's Early Light: American Thought and Culture at the Dawn of the Atomic Age (1994)
- Carpenter, Charles A. Dramatists and the Bomb: American and British Playwrights Confront the Nuclear Age, 1945–1964. Greenwood, 1999. 183 pp.
- Charney, Michael W. "U Nu, China and the "Burmese" Cold War: Propaganda in Burma in the 1950s" in Zheng Yangwen, Hong Liu, & Michael Szonyi (eds.), The Cold War in Asia: The Battle for Hearts and Minds (Leiden: Brill University Press): pp. 41–58.
- Dudziak, Mary L. Cold War civil rights: Race and the image of American democracy (2nd ed. Princeton UP, 2011), widely cited study..
- Gery, John. Nuclear Annihilation and Contemporary American Poetry: Ways of Nothingness. U. Press of Florida, 1996. 235 pp.
- Fainberg, Dina. Cold War Correspondents: Soviet and American Reporters on the Ideological Frontlines'. Baltimore: Johns Hopkins University Press, 2020.
- Henriksen, Margot A. Dr. Strangelove's America: Society and Culture in the Atomic Age. U. of California Press, 1997. 451 pp.
- Kirby, Dianne, ed. Religion and the Cold War (2003) 272 pp.
- Kuznick, Peter J., and James Gilbert, eds. Rethinking Cold War Culture (Smithsonian Institution, 2013).
- Major, Patrick. "Future Perfect?: Communist Science Fiction in the Cold War." Cold War History 2003 4(1): 71–96. ISSN 1468-2745 Fulltext: in Ebsco
- Marsh, Rosalind J. Soviet Fiction Since Stalin: science, politics and literature (1986)
- McConachie, Bruce. American Theatre and the Culture of the Cold War: Producing and Contesting Containment, 1947–1962. University of Iowa Press, 2003; 364pp
- Medhurst, Martin J. Cold War Rhetoric: Strategy, Metaphor, and Ideology Michigan State University Press, 1997
- Miller, D. Quentin. John Updike and the Cold War: Drawing the Iron Curtain (2001)
- Mitter, Rana; Patrick Major. Across the Blocs. Exploring Comparative Cold War Cultural and Social History (2004) 150pp;
- Mulvihill, Jason. "James Bond's Cold War Part I" Journal of Instructional Media, Vol. 28, (2001)
- Parker, Stephen R., Rhys W. Williams, Colin Riordan. German Writers and the Cold War, 1945-61 (1992) 250pp
- Resch, John P. and Richard Jensen, eds. Americans at War: Society, Culture and the Homefront (2005), vol 4: 1946 to Present
- Saunders, Frances Stonor. The cultural cold war: The CIA and the world of arts and letters (New Press, 2013).
- Sarantakes, Nicholas Evan. "The Olympics and the Cold War: A Historiography" Journal of Cold War Studies (Dec 2023), Vol.25, 127–158. doi: 10.1162/jcws_a_01173
- Schwartz, Richard Alan. Cold War Culture: Media and the Arts, 1945–1990 (2000)
- Seed, David. American Science Fiction and the Cold War (2002)
- Shapiro Jerome F. Atomic Bomb Cinema: The Apocalyptic Imagination on Film (2001)
- Shaw, Tony. Cinematic Cold War: The American and Soviet Struggle for Hearts and Minds (University Press of Kansas; 2010) 301 pages; compares five American and five Soviet films
- Stone, Albert E. Literary Aftershocks: American Writers, Readers, and the Bomb. (1994).
- Turner, Catherine. Pressing the fight: print, propaganda, and the Cold War (U of Massachusetts Press, 2012).
- Ventresca, Robert A. "The Virgin and the Bear: Religion, Society and the Cold War in Italy." Journal of Social History. Volume: 37#2 (2003) pp 439+.
- Whitfield, Stephen J. The Culture of the Cold War (1996) ISBN 0-8018-5195-5
- Winkler, Allan M. Life under a Cloud: American Anxiety about the Atom. (1993). 290 pp.
- Wittner, Lawrence S. The Struggle against the Bomb. 3 vol (1993–2003). antiwar movements in US and Europe
- Zeman, Scott C. "I Was a Cold War Monster: Horror Films, Eroticism and the Cold War Imagination," Journal of Popular Culture, August 2004

=== Novels ===
- Burdick, Eugene, and Harvey Wheeler. Fail-Safe (1962)

== Religion ==
- Gunn, T. Jeremy Spiritual Weapons: The Cold War and the Forging of an American National Religion (2008) ISBN 0-275-98549-0 Praeger
- Kirby, Dianne (Editor) Religion and the Cold War (2002) ISBN 0-333-99398-5 Palgrave Macmillan
- Inboden III, William Religion and American Foreign Policy, 1945–1960: The Soul of Containment (2008) ISBN 0-521-51347-2 Cambridge University Press

== Other works ==
- Wandycz, P. (2002). The Polish Political Emigration and the Origins of the Cold War. The Polish Review, 47(3), 317–324.

== Historiography ==
- Anderson, Sheldon R. "Condemned to Repeat it:" lessons of History" and the Making of US Cold War Containment Policy (Lexington Books, 2008).
- Autio-Sarasmo, Sari. "A New Historiography of the Cold War?" European History Quarterly (2011) 41#4 pp 657–664, focus on Europe
- Borhi, László. "Rollback, liberation, containment, or inaction? US policy and eastern Europe in the 1950s." Journal of Cold War Studies 1.3 (1999): 67–110.
- Corke, Sarah-Jane. "History, historians and the Naming of Foreign Policy: A Postmodern Reflection on American Strategic thinking during the Truman Administration," Intelligence and National Security, Autumn 2001, Vol. 16 Issue 3, pp. 146–63.
- Dimić, Ljubodrag. "Historiography on the Cold War in Yugoslavia: from ideology to science." Cold War History 8.2 (2008): 285–297.
- Drew, S. Nelson, and Paul H. Nitze. NSC-68 forging the strategy of containment (iane Publishing, 1994).
- Duara, Prasenjit. "The Cold War as a historical period: an interpretive essay." Journal of Global History 6#3 (2011): 457–480. online
- Dülffer, Jost. "Cold War history in Germany." Cold War History 8.2 (2008): 135–156.
- Ferrell, Robert H. Harry S. Truman and the Cold War Revisionists. (2006). 142 pp.
- Fitzpatrick, Sheila. "Russia's Twentieth Century in History and Historiography," The Australian Journal of Politics and History, Vol. 46, 2000
- Gaddis, John Lewis, We Now Know: Rethinking Cold War History, (1998) also
- Gaddis, John Lewis. "The Emerging Post-Revisionist Synthesis on the Origins of the Cold War," Diplomatic History, Summer 1983: 171–190.
- Gaddis, John Lewis. Strategies of Containment: A Critical Appraisal of Postwar American National Security Policy. (1982).
- Garthoff, Raymond L. "Foreign Intelligence and the Historiography of the Cold War." Journal of Cold War Studies 2004 6(2): 21–56. ISSN 1520-3972 Fulltext: Project MUSE
- Garthoff, Raymond L. A journey through the Cold War: a memoir of containment and coexistence (Brookings Institution Press, 2004).
- Hogan, Michael J., ed. America in the World: The Historiography of US Foreign Relations since 1941 (1996), scholarly articles reprinted from the journal Diplomatic History
- Hopkins, Michael F. "Historiographical Reviews Continuing Debate And New Approaches In Cold War History" Historical Journal (2007) 50#4 pp 913–934.
- Hwang, Dongyoun. "The politics of China studies in South Korea: A critical examination of South Korean historiography of modern China since 1945" Journal of Modern Chinese History (2012) 6#2 pp 256–276
- Kaplan, Lawrence S. American Historians and the Atlantic Alliance, (1991)
- Kort, Michael. The Columbia Guide to the Cold War (1998)
- Maier, Charles S. "Revisionism and the Interpretation of Cold War Origins," Perspectives in American History (1970), Vol. 4, pp 313–347
- Masur, Matthew, ed. Understanding and Teaching the Cold War (U of Wisconsin Press, 2017). xii, 364 pp.
- Matlock, Jack F. "The End of the Cold War" Harvard International Review, Vol. 23 (2001)
- Olesen, Thorsten B. "Under the national paradigm: Cold War studies and Cold War politics in post-Cold War Norden." Cold War History 8.2 (2008): 189–211.
- Olesen, Thorsten B.Ed. The Cold War and the Nordic Countries: Historiography at a Crossroads. Odense: U Southern Denmark Press, 2004. Pp. 194.
- Roberts, Priscilla. "New Perspectives on Cold War History from China," Diplomatic History 41:2 (April 2017) online
- Romero, Federico. "Cold War historiography at the crossroads." Cold War History (2014) 14#4 pp 685–703.
- Seniavskaia, Aleksandr S. and Elena Seniavskaia. "The Historical Memory of Twentieth-Century Wars as an Arena of Ideological, Political, and Psychological Confrontation." Russian Studies in History (2010), 49#1 pp 53–91.
- Suri, Jeremi. "Explaining the End of the Cold War: A New Historical Consensus?" Journal of Cold War Studies (2002) 4#4 pp. 60–92 in Project MUSE
- Trachtenberg, Marc. "The Marshall Plan as Tragedy." Journal of Cold War Studies 2005 7#1 pp 135–140. ISSN 1520-3972 Fulltext: in Project MUSE
- Ulam, Adam B. Understanding the Cold War: A Historian's Personal Reflections (2002) excerpt
- Varsori, Antonio. "Cold War history in Italy." Cold War History 8.2 (2008): 157–187.
- Viola, L. (2002). The Cold War in American Soviet Historiography and the End of the Soviet Union. Russian Review, 61(1), 25–34.
- Walker, J. Samuel. "Historians and Cold War Origins: The New Consensus", in Gerald K. Haines and J. Samuel Walker, eds., American Foreign Relations: A Historiographical Review (1981), 207–236.
- Westad, Odd Arne. "The new international history of the Cold War: three (possible) paradigms." Diplomatic History 24.4 (2000): 551–565.
- Westad, Arne Odd, ed. Reviewing the Cold War: Approaches, Interpretations, Theory (2000) essays by scholars
- White, Timothy J. "Cold War Historiography: New Evidence Behind Traditional Typographies" International Social Science Review, (2000)
- William Appleman Williams The Tragedy of American Diplomacy (1958) (1988 edition: ISBN 0-393-30493-0)
  - Berger, Henry W. ed. A William Appleman Williams Reader (1992)
  - Redefining the Past: Essays in Diplomatic History in Honor of William Appleman Williams. Lloyd C. Gardner (ed.) (1986)
- Xia, Yafeng. "The Study of Cold War International History in China: A Review of the Last Twenty Years," Journal of Cold War Studies10#1 Winter 2008, pp. 81–115 in Project MUSE

== Primary sources: Documents and memoirs ==
=== Document collections ===
- Chang, Laurence and Peter Kornbluh, eds., The Cuban Missile Crisis, 1962 (1985)
- Etzold, Thomas and John Lewis Gaddis, eds., Containment: Documents on American Policy and Strategy, 1945–1950 (1978)
- Hanhimaki, Jussi M. and Odd Arne Westad, eds. The Cold War: A History in Documents and Eyewitness Accounts (2004)
- John B. Hattendorf, ed., U.S. Naval Strategy in the 1970s: Selected Documents. Newport Paper, no. .(Newport: Naval War College Press, 2007).
  - John B. Hattendorf and Peter M. Swartz, eds., U.S. Naval Strategy in the 1980s: Selected Documents. Newport Paper, no. 33.(Newport: Naval War College Press, 2008).
  - John B. Hattendorf, The Evolution of the U.S. Navy's Maritime Strategy, 1977-1986. Newport Paper, no. 19 (Newport: Naval War College Press, 2005). Appendix I, pp. 101–183, is the CIA's National Intelligence Estimate on "Soviet Naval Strategy and Programs through 1990": NIE-11—15-82D of 19 October 1982.
- Trefousse, Hans Louis, ed.The cold war: a book of documents (1965) online free to borrow
- "Cold War Archival Material". United States Army Center of Military History. Archived from the original on January 7, 2010.
- "Digital Archive". Cold War International History Project.

=== Memoirs ===
- Acheson, Dean. Present at the Creation: My Years in the State Department (1992).
- Baruch, Bernard. The Public Years (1960).
- Bohlen, Charles. Witness to History, 1929–1969. 1973
- Brezhnev, Leonid Brezhnev's trilogy (1978–79)
- Brzezinski, Zbigniew. Power and Principle: Memoirs of the National Security Adviser, 1977–1981 (1983);
- Djilas, Milovan. Conversations with Stalin. 1962, Yugoslav Communist perspective
- Eden, Anthony. The Memoirs of Anthony Eden, Earl of Avon. Vol. 2: The Reckoning. London: 1965.
- Eisenhower, Dwight D. The White House Years: Mandate for Change, 1953–1956. (1963); The White House Years: Waging Peace, 1957–1961. (1965).
- Kennan, George F. Memoirs, 1925–1950. 1957
- Kosygin, Alexei, Memoirs (?)
- Khrushchev, Nikita. Memoirs:
  - Khrushchev Remembers ed. Strobe Talbott (1991)
  - Khrushchev Remembers: The Last Testament ed. Strobe Talbott (1987)
    - Khrushchev Remembers: The Glasnost Tapes ed. Jerrold Schechter (1989)
- Gromyko, Andrei Memoirs (1989).
- Kissinger, Henry
  - vol 1 White House Years (1979)
  - vol 2 Years of Upheaval (1982)
  - vol 3 Years of Renewal (1999), 1974–1976
- Nixon, Richard. Memoirs (1981)
- Pipes, Richard. Vixi: Memoirs of a Non-Belonger (2003).
- Shultz, George P. Turmoil and Triumph: My Years as Secretary of State (1993)

== See also ==
- Bibliography of Canadian military history
- Bibliography of United States military history
- Bibliography of Stalinism and the Soviet Union
- Bibliography of the Post Stalinist Soviet Union
