= Yuriko Doi =

Japanese-born American stage director, choreographer, and performer

Yuriko Doi is a stage director, choreographer, performer and former founding artistic director of Theatre of Yugen (San Francisco, California). Doi specializes in the fusion of traditional Japanese dramatic arts with modern world theater.

== Theatre of Yugen ==
Japanese-born and trained in the classical theater styles of Noh and Kyogen, Doi brought this heritage to the West in the 1960s, founding Theatre of Yugen in 1978. That troupe has proven to be the major beneficiary of Doi's directorial resume’ of more than 30 productions. Her foundation in these arts began when she was a graduate student of Waseda University in Tokyo, where she studied with Kyogen master and National Living Treasure of Japan, Mansaku Nomura (Izumi School). She has also been influenced by the Noh practice of her aunt, Yuki Doi (Hosho School), and her studies with Noh principal actor Shiro Nomura (Kanze School). Developing her skills in both forms through continued study with Mansaku Nomura, his disciple Yukio Ishida, and Shiro Nomura, Doi has worked diligently to share these arts with an American audience and students.

The array of productions Doi has directed range from classics and adaptations to original works. She has taken for her inspiration theater throughout time, from around the world, directing plays that run in style and subject matter from Japanese and Greek mythology to 20th-century American, using movements from sources as diverse as flamenco and Native American dance.

The classical Japanese plays Doi has directed include the Noh plays: Sotoba Komachi (1987); and the Kyogen plays: The Melon Thief/Uri Nusubito (1978), Sweet Poison/Busu (1980), The Magnificent Beard/Higeyagura (1981), The Sickle and Injured Pride/Uri Nusubito (1981), Three handicapped Men/Sannin Katawa (1981), Owl Mountain Priest/Fukuro Yamabushi (1983), Parting of the Seasons/Setsubun (1985), Tug of War/Kubibiki (1987), Sumo Wrestling with a Mosquito (1987), The Persimmon Mountain Priest/Kaki Yamabushi (1996), Tied to a Pole/Bo Shibari (2002), Spring Water/Shimizu (2004)

== Directed adaptations ==
Doi's directed adaptations and originals include:

- The Cenci by Antonin Artaud (1978)
- The Embracing Trees by William Powell (1981)
- Purgatory by W. B. Yeats (1981)
- Jaku and the Beanstalk by Yuriko Doi (1982)
- Twilight Crane/Yuzuru by Junji Kinoshita (1982)
- Antigone by Sophocles (1983)
- Waiting for Godot by Samuel Beckett (1984)
- Medea by Carol Fisher Sorgenfrei (1984)
- Komachi Fuden by Shogo Ohta (1986)
- The Dog God/Inugami by Shuji Terayama (1991)
- The Imposter by Carol Fisher Sorgenfrei (1992)
- Tea by Velina Hasu Houston (1992)
- The Dressing Room/Gakuya by Kunio Shimizu (1992)
- Drifting Fires by Janine Beichman (1993)
- Noh Christmas Carol by Cianna Stewart and Yuriko Doi (1993)
- True Heart/Kokoro by Velina Hasu Houston(1994)
- Salome/Sarome Kyu Kyu No Dan by Masakatsu Gunji (1994)
- Elephant/Zo by Minoru Betsuyaku (1995)
- Down the Dark Well/Mumyo no I by Erik Ehn (1996)
- Blood Wine, Blood Wedding by Carol Sorgenfrei (1997)
- Crazy Horse by Erik Ehn (2001)
