= Chernus =

Chernus is a surname. Notable people with the surname include:

- Ira Chernus (born 1946), American journalist, author, and professor
- Michael Chernus (born 1977), American actor
