= Theatre of Yugen =

Theatre company in San Francisco, California

Theatre of Yugen is a non-profit theater company based in San Francisco, California, that specializes in bringing Japanese performing arts to American audiences. Theatre of Yugen in its 34th season was founded in 1978 by founder and director Yuriko Doi. The troupe centers its production efforts on creating works of world theater influenced by the classical Japanese dramatic forms of Noh and Kyogen.

Theatre of Yugen's experimental ensemble features artists from North America, Europe, and Asia who have been trained in traditional Japanese Noh and Kyogen forms. Current ensemble members include Sheila Berotti, Sheila Devitt, Karen Marek, Jubilith Moore, Lluis Valls, and Stephen Siegel.

Theatre of Yugen's founder's vision was to expose American audiences to the 600-year-old forms of Noh and Kyogen style theatre. This vision is carried on through today's troupe which still carries a foundation in Japanese Noh drama and Kyogen comedy to create works of world theater by crafting original material and exploring dramatic and literary classics.

In addition to its theatrical works, Theatre of Yugen has continued its education of the American audience and support for its community through youth and adult trainings and workshops, artist in residence programs, and festival and school performances. Theatre of Yugen's home in San Francisco is at NOHspace, a 50-seat theatre venue in the Project Artaud arts complex located in San Francisco's Mission district. In addition to featuring the works of Theatre of Yugen, NOHspace also hosts other Bay Area and world performers.
