= Carol Fisher Sorgenfrei =

American academic

Carol Fisher Sorgenfrei (born January 14, 1947, in Chicago, Illinois) is a scholar, translator, editor, and playwright who assumes the title of "founding mother" of Asian theater studies for her contributions to the study of cross-cultural performance and her expertise in Asian theatre. She has published extensively on Asian cultural practices and has written plays incorporating elements of traditional Japanese drama. She is a Professor Emeritus at UCLA.

== Education ==
Her interest in Asian theatre, particularly in relation to Japan, was inspired by a contemporary French theatre class she attended under Leonard Pronko in Pomona College. She later explained, the professor "spent a lot of time explicating the ways that French theatre had been influenced by Asian performance... What I liked was theatrical theatre—so Japanese theatre was the natural thing." She extended her studies in Japanese theatre by moving to the International Christian University in Mitaka, Japan where she received language training and exposure to Japanese theatre. As a result of the "Zenkyōtō" student uprisings in 1968, which closed universities nationwide, she spent five months exploring theatre throughout Asia.

She returned to Pomona College and received her BA in 1970. She received her MA in playwriting four years later from the University of California, Santa Barbara where she also received her doctorate in 1978.

== Career ==
Sorgenfrei was a professor at UCLA from 1980 to 2011, where she served as both a scholar and creative artist. She wrote plays, which reflected her interest in relationships between contemporary Japanese and Western theatre. In 1975, she wrote Medea: A Noh Cycle Based on Greek Myth, which served as a hybrid envisioning of Euripides' Medea in the style of a Westernized, Japanese Noh. She incorporated kabuki and Greek theatre in Fireplay: The Legend of Prometheus, which her professor Leonard Pronko directed in 1987. Inspired by Molière's Tartuffe, she wrote The Impostor in 1992, which integrated two different comedic styles: Japanese kyogen and commedia dell'arte. In 1997, she wrote Blood Wine, Blood Wedding, which functioned as tribute to Federico Garcia Lorca's Blood Wedding and Chikamatsu Monzaemon's Love Suicides at Sonezaki; integrating both theatrical styles of Spanish flamenco and Japanese kabuki into the play's performance.

Sorgenfrei's plays draw inspiration from the western canon — often serving as reinterpretations of classics with a combination of Japanese plays and performance styles. Her fusion of performance styles and contemporary theatre improves understanding of plays by offering an intercultural East/West mix. In retelling Medea through a Noh cycle, her work reaches out to other cultural audiences and challenges western social norms. As theatre historian Helene Foley has argued, Medea: A Noh Cycle Based on Greek Myth "turn[s] to a reimagined Japanese tradition to empower a more aggressive feminist assault on patriarchal culture." Sorgenfrei's play achieves the desired effect by portraying the story of a powerful female protagonist through a performance style in which traditionally only Japanese men participated. Her reinterpretation subverts Athen's and Japan's patriarchal theatre while also offering an analytical amalgamation of cultures, which reflects the creative and academic possibilities of theatre.

In 2015, she showcased her most recent play Ghost Light: The Haunting at the Barrow Group Theater in New York. The play was produced as an equity showcasing by La Luna Productions—a feminist theatre company she cofounded to promote empowering stories through kabuki performance. The company carries her signature splicing of Japanese theatre with American theatrical conventions. Ghost Light draws inspiration from Macbeth and the kabuki play Yatuya Ghost Stories, which both carry plots of treachery and vengeance. In a review describing the play's performance, Yatsunov comments that the play, "crafts a unique style with influences beyond kabuki and Shakespeare, finding well placed touches of TV-crime-drama and old-timey vaudeville.".

== Publications ==
Described as the "founding mother" of Asian theatre studies, Sorgenfrei remains an influential scholar in the field of Japanese theatrical studies. Published in 2005, Unspeakable Acts: the avant-garde theatre of Terayama Shuji and Postwar Japan remains one of her most accredited academic studies. It discusses the work of Shūji Terayama, who was a poet, playwright, stage director, photographer, filmmaker, novelist and critic that heavily influenced the avant-garde movement in 60's and 70's Japan. Through an in-depth analysis of his influences, style, and his major works, Sorgenfrei offers an introduction to Terayama and an understanding of contemporary Japanese theatre for the Western perspective. Within the second half of her publication, she also provides translations of three of his plays as well as a compilation of his writings on theatre. It exists as an authoritative academic source on Terayama with a selection of the few English translations of his works.

In 2006, Sorgen released the textbook Theatre Histories: An Introduction, published by Routledge. Co-authored the publication with Bruce A. McConachie, Gary Jay Williams, and Phillip Zarilliis, it discusses the history of theatre throughout the world. A review for Asian Theatre Journal, David Jortner states that the text remains a unique presentation of world theatre as it "gives an equal amount of text to non-Western... performance and places it in an equal historical and cultural context" as the Western canon in a non-chronological order. Fischer also contributed to the book's second and third editions, published in 2010 and 2013.

== Bibliography ==
- Sorgenfrei, Carol (2005). Unspeakable Acts: The Avant-Garde Theatre of Terayama Shuji and Postwar Japan. Hawaii: University of Hawaii Press. ISBN 0824827961.
- McConachie, Bruce; Nelhaus, Tobin; Sorgenfrei, Carol; Underiner, Tamara (2016). Theatre Histories: An Introduction. United Kingdom: Routledge. ISBN 978-0415837965.
