= Gorbachev: His Life and Times =

2017 biography by William Taubman

- Author: William Taubman
- Genre: Biography
- Publisher: W.W. Norton & Company
- Publication date: 2017
- Pages: 852
- ISBN: 978-0-393-64701-3
- OCLC: 1002649998

Gorbachev: His Life and Times is a 2017 biography of Mikhail Gorbachev by William Taubman. Taubman was the recipient of the 2004 Pulitzer Prize for Biography or Autobiography, as well as the 2004 National Book Critics Circle Award. The book describes life of last General Secretary of the Communist Party of the Soviet Union and the only President of the Soviet Union Mikhail Gorbachev.

== See also ==
- Khrushchev: The Man and His Era
