= William Taubman =

American political scientist (born 1941)

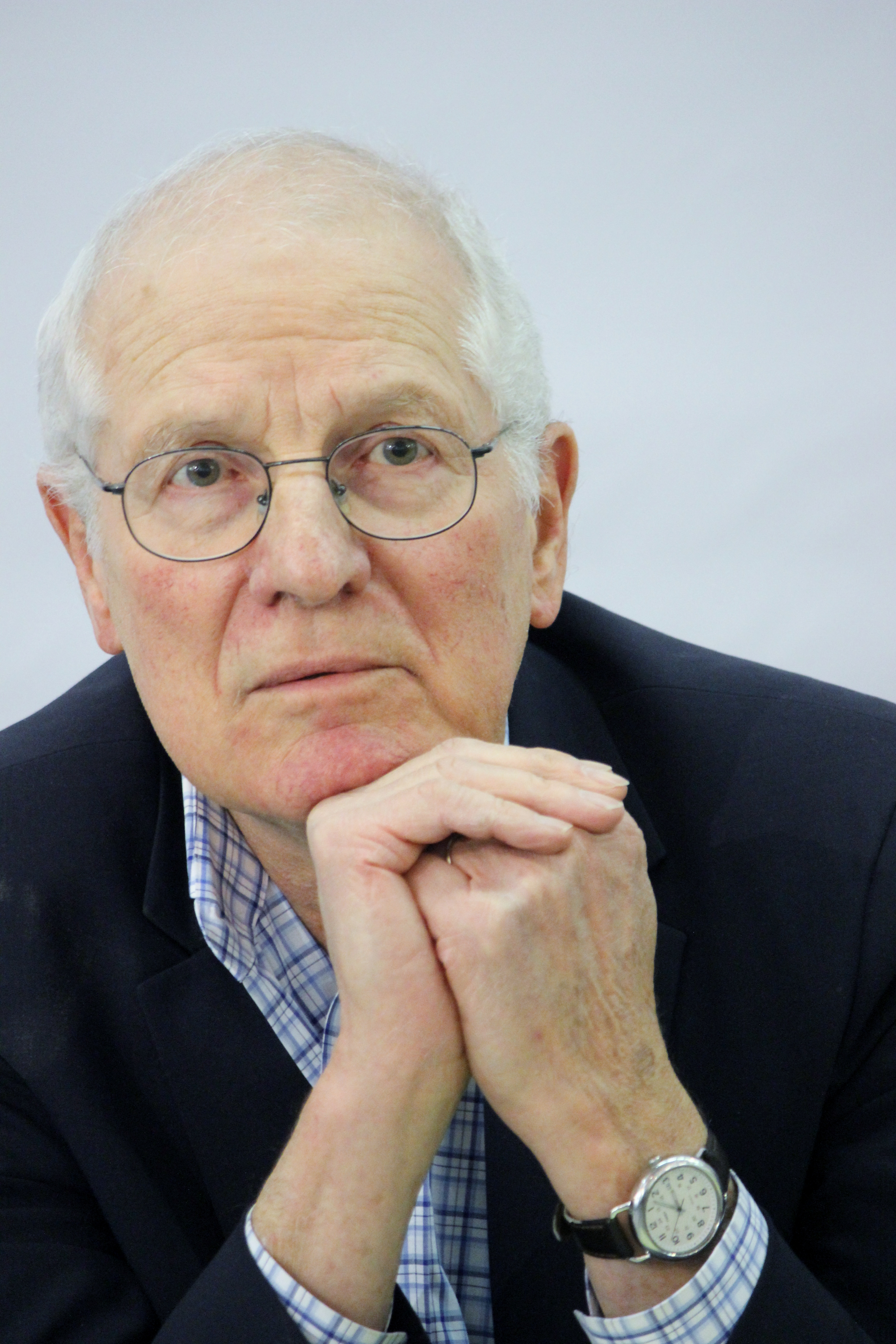
- Taubman in 2018
- Born: William Chase Taubman; November 13, 1941 (age 84); New York City, U.S.
- Spouse: Jane A. Taubman
- Awards: National Book Critics Circle Award; Pulitzer Prize for Biography (2004) Robert H. Ferrell Book Prize (2004) Wayne S. Vucinich Prize (2004)

Academic background
- Education: Harvard University (BA); Columbia University (MA, PhD)

Academic work
- Discipline: Political science
- Institutions: Amherst College
- Notable works: Khrushchev: The Man and His Era (2003), Gorbachev: His Life and Times (2017)
- Website: williamtaubmanbooks.com

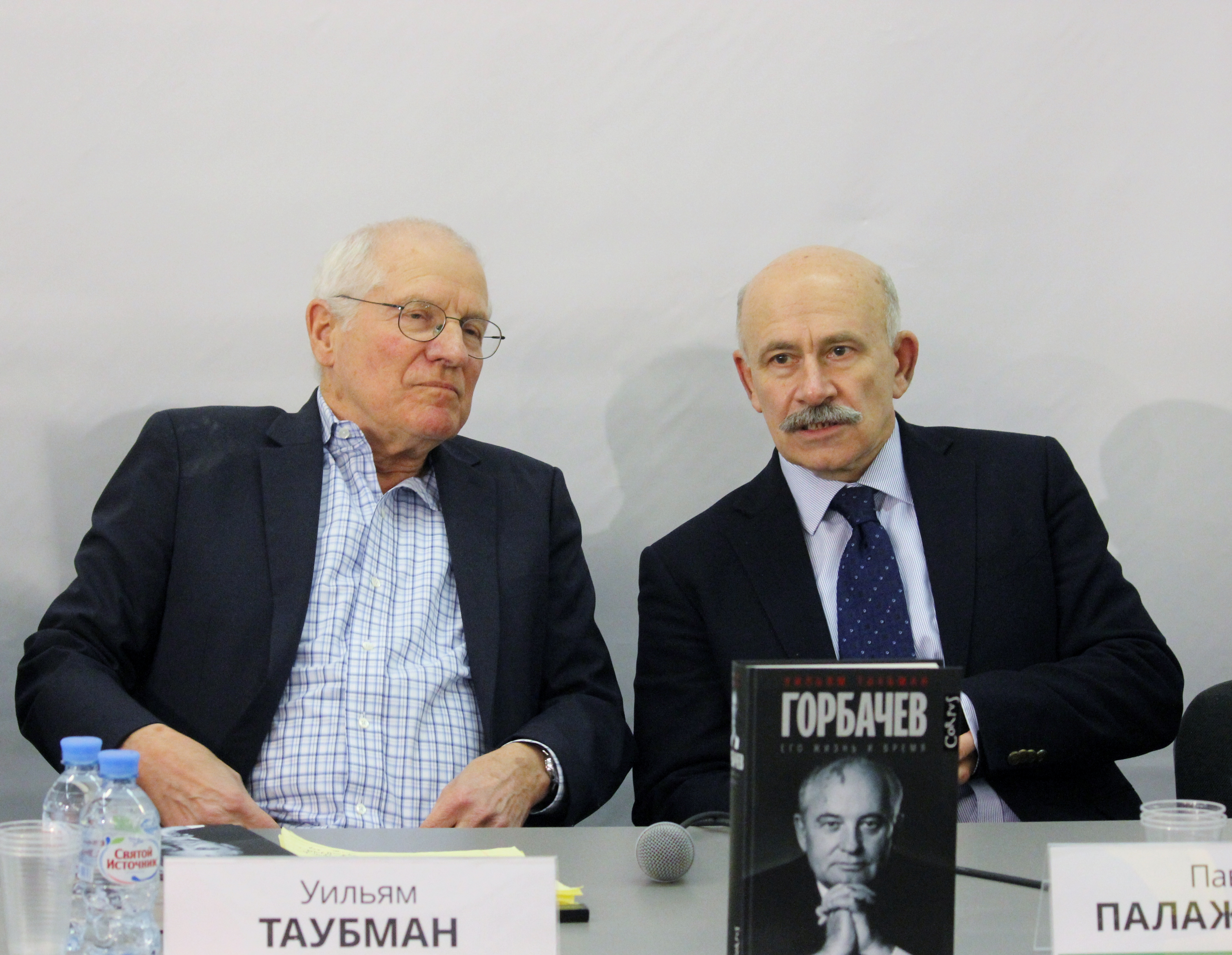
Taubman with Pavel Palazhchenko, a former interpreter for Mikhail Gorbachev

William Chase Taubman (born November 13, 1941, in New York City) is an American political scientist. His biography of Nikita Khrushchev won the Pulitzer Prize for Biography in 2004 and the National Book Critics Circle Award for Biography in 2003.

He is the Bertrand Snell Professor of Political Science, Emeritus, at Amherst College.

== Personal life ==
Taubman is the son of Nora Stern, a teacher, and Howard Taubman, who was chief music critic and then chief theater critic for The New York Times in the 1950s and 60s. He is a graduate of the Bronx High School of Science and received a B.A. from Harvard University in 1962, an M.A. from Columbia University in 1965, a Certificate of the Russian Institute in 1965, and a Ph.D. from Columbia University in 1969.

William Taubman is the brother of diplomatic journalist Philip Taubman.

His wife, Jane A. Taubman, was a professor of Russian, Emerita, at Amherst College.

Taubman was the recipient of a 2006 Guggenheim fellowship.

== Selected publications ==
External videos
- Part One of Booknotes interview with Taubman on Khrushchev: The Man and His Era, April 20, 2003, C-SPAN
- Part Two of Booknotes interview with Taubman, April 27, 2003, C-SPAN
- Trump and Putin in Historical Perspective: How We Got into the New Cold War, Amherst College. A talk by William Taubman, the Bertrand Snell Professor of Political Science, Emeritus (June 6, 2017)

Books

- McNamara at War: A New History, with Philip Taubman (W. W. Norton & Company, 2025), ISBN 978-1-324-00716-6.
- Gorbachev: His Life and Times (W. W. Norton & Company, 2017), ISBN 978-0-393-64701-3.
- Khrushchev: The Man and His Era (W. W. Norton & Company, 2003), ISBN 0-393-05144-7.
- Moscow Spring with Jane Taubman (Summit Books, 1989), ISBN 0-671-67731-4.
- Stalin's American Policy: From Entente to Détente to Cold War (W W Norton & Company, 1982), ISBN 0-393-01406-1.
- Khrushchev on Khrushchev by Sergei Khrushchev, (editor/translator). (Boston: Little, Brown, 1990)
