= Khrushchev: The Man and His Era =

Book by William Taubman

- Author: William Taubman
- Cover artist: Brooke Koven
- Language: English
- Subject: Nikita Khrushchev
- Genre: Nonfiction, biography
- Publisher: W. W. Norton & Company, Simon & Schuster
- Publication date: March 1, 2003
- Publication place: United States
- Media type: Print, audio, digital
- Pages: 871
- Awards: 2004 Pulitzer Prize for Biography or Autobiography; 2004 National Book Critics Circle Award
- ISBN: 978-0-393-32484-6
- OCLC: 123552984
- Dewey Decimal: 947.085'2'092'B
- LC Class: DK275.K5 T38 2003

Khrushchev: The Man and His Era is a 2003 biography of Soviet leader Nikita Khrushchev. Written by William Taubman, the book is the first in-depth and comprehensive American biography of Khrushchev. Taubman was the recipient of the 2004 Pulitzer Prize for Biography or Autobiography, as well as the 2004 National Book Critics Circle Award. The author spent almost 20 years researching the life of Khrushchev in preparation to write the book. Extensive research was made possible through access to archives in Russia and Ukraine, which were opened to the public following the collapse of the Soviet Union. In addition to printed materials and documentation, he spent time engaging Khrushchev's children and extended relatives, resulting in over 70 personal interviews. Taubman presents a historical narrative and study of the life of Nikita Khrushchev, the Soviet leader who succeeded Joseph Stalin. The book concludes with Khrushchev's death on September 11, 1971.

== Synopsis ==
Khrushchev: The Man and His Era presents a historical narrative and study of the life of Nikita Khrushchev, the Soviet leader who succeeded Joseph Stalin. Historian and author, William Taubman offers a brief overview of Khrushchev's childhood and early life. He was raised in an economically depressed home and received little formal education. After he attended two years of school, his father pulled him out of class to begin working in the fields. Prior to his involvement in politics, he worked as a skilled metal worker in the Russian coal mining region. In spite of being relegated to working in the mines, Khrushchev was naturally intelligent and a quick learner. He was viewed by the Bolshevik party as the ideal recruit.

In 1918, Khrushchev joined the Bolsheviks, where he displayed a strong work ethic and total loyalty to the party. Taubman presents a political and psychological analysis of Khrushchev, taking a comprehensive look at his quick rise in the Communist Party under Stalin. In January 1934, Khrushchev succeeded his mentor, Lazar Kaganovich as the First Secretary of the Communist Party in Moscow. Khrushchev was responsible for overseeing the development and completion of the Moscow Metro.

Following Stalin's death in 1953, there was a power struggle, from which Khrushchev emerged as the First Secretary. Khrushchev's life and career mirrored the successes and failures of Soviet ideology, including national famine, collectivism, industrialization, and his participation in the Soviet revolution of October 1917. He lived through World War I, the Russian Civil War and World War II. He led the Soviet Union during the first part of the Cold War. In addition to serving as First Secretary of the Communist Party, he also served as the Chairman (or Premier) of the Council of Ministers from 1958 to 1964.

Khrushchev was one of the more complex and prominent political figures of the 20th century. He was known for his often contradictory decisions and political leadership. While he supported the Great Purge and authorized thousands of arrests and executions when Stalin was in power, he denounced these actions upon Stalin's death. He conspired in criminal acts with Stalin, while seemingly retaining his ability to feel compassion for others and empathize with their personal hardship and tragedies. He also supported de-Stalinization and attempted to reform the political climate of the Soviet Union. Taubman provides comprehensive details about Khrushchev's "Secret Speech", as well as his involvement in the 1956 Soviet invasion of Hungary and the Cuban Missile Crisis. There is also a fairly detailed account of Khrushchev's troubled and ambivalent relationship with artists and intellectuals, which reveals him at his worst, often devoid of elementary self-control.

On February 25, 1956, Khrushchev gave a clandestine speech to the Twentieth Party Congress of the Communist Party of the Soviet Union, which was entitled, "On the Cult of Personality and Its Consequences", which denounced Stalin and his protégés. Khrushchev charged Stalin with fostering a personality cult, despite maintaining support for the ideals of communism. The speech was highly critical of Stalin and his reign of terror, primarily denouncing the purges of the Soviet military and Communist Party, which had taken place during the latter part of the 1930s. The speech brought forth several accusations, notably those concerning the Moscow Trials, where rulings were made based on forced confessions obtained through torture. Judicial decisions were determined based on liberal interpretations of Article 58 of the Russian SFSR Penal Code, which was introduced in 1927 in order to arrest persons suspected of counter-revolutionary activities. Due process, in accordance with Soviet law, was often dismissed and replaced with summary proceedings issued by institutional commissions known as NKVD troikas, who issued sentences to the accused without representation, defense, or trial.

During the early 1960s, Americans viewed Khrushchev with apprehension and disdain, fearing he would bring about further war and nuclear holocaust. In 1962, the Soviet Union supported Cuba, following a failed attempt by the US to overthrow the Cuban government in the Bay of Pigs invasion and the Cuban Project. Khrushchev intended to place Soviet nuclear missiles on Cuba, threatening nuclear holocaust and essentially deterring future invasion of the island by the US. In response, the US established a military blockade by air and sea, crippling the ability of the Premier to deliver the missiles to Cuba. During this time, Khrushchev and US President John F. Kennedy, along with United Nations Secretary-General U Thant, reached an agreement that ended the conflict. Khrushchev agreed to dismantle the offensive weapons in Cuba and return them to the Soviet Union, while the US made a public statement declaring that it would never invade Cuba. This effectively ended the confrontation on October 28, 1962.

Overall, Khrushchev's political power laid the groundwork for the eventual demise and disintegration of the Soviet Union. At the same time, his efforts to lift the curtain on the Cold War ended up bringing about further crises. In addition to the Cuban Missile Crisis, author Taubman writes about Khrushchev's involvement with the shoe-banging incident, the Berlin Wall, and Sputnik. The book concludes with Khrushchev's death on September 11, 1971.

== Research ==
Khrushchev: The Man and His Era was written by William Taubman, who serves as a professor of political science at Amherst College. The book is the first in-depth biography of Khrushchev, the publication of which was made possible by newly established access to archives in Russia and Ukraine, following the collapse of the Soviet Union. Prior to Khrushchev: The Man and His Era, no other book was able to fully reflect the personal life and professional background of Soviet leaders, due to open source restrictions and lack of accessible materials and documentation. He spent almost 20 years researching the life of Khrushchev in preparation to write his book. He culled information from a collection of documents, unpublished memoirs, and newsreels that have been held by approximately two dozen Soviet and American archives. He also consulted published books, and magazine and newspaper articles, while also engaging Khrushchev's children and extended relatives, resulting in over 70 personal interviews.

== Reception ==
External videos
- Part One of Booknotes interview with William Taubman on Khrushchev: The Man and His Era, April 20, 2003, C-SPAN
- Part Two of Booknotes interview with Taubman, April 27, 2003, C-SPAN

On March 16, 2003, Leon Aron of The New York Times reviewed the book and remarked that the work lives up to its title, fully introducing the time and era in which Khrushchev lived. Aron states that it is a "multifaceted study of the key political and economic forces of the first 47 years of the Soviet civilization".

On March 26, 2003, Richard Pipes in The Times lauded the work and stated that, while there were over a dozen biographies written of Khrushchev, the biography is "the first scholarly study of this Soviet leader based on a thorough examination of all the existing literature as well as the available archival sources and interviews with those who knew him". Pipes also surmised that the "lively narrative is likely to remain for a considerable time the standard study of [Khrushchev]".

Archie Brown of The Guardian was "intrigued" by the influence that Khrushchev had on the Soviet political arena. Brown states that Taubman's book is "by far the best and most thorough contribution to understanding Khrushchev's personality and politics ever written". At the same time, he dismisses Taubman's writing regarding the level of continuing acceptance that the citizens of the Soviet Union had toward communism, stating that Taubman "oversimplifies" the truth when he says that "Gorbachev shared Khrushchev's naivete about the extent of the Soviet people's commitment to communism". Brown countered that "Gorbachev himself ceased to be a Communist and increasingly embraced a social democratic conception of socialism; it was this that he believed corresponded with the aspirations of a majority of the Soviet people." Brown also questioned the reliability of content attributed to an interview with a leading Russian pollster, who stated that "the only two periods of the 20th century that Russians evaluate positively are those associated with the last tsar, Nicholas II, and Nikita Khrushchev". Brown said that the surveys used by pollsters merely "reflect changing views of the present". He said that Taubman was "misleading" by using this source, whereas the most reliable polling data shows that while "public consensus in 1994 [revealed that] 33 [percent] of respondents held Khrushchev's period to be the best of the 20th century and 36 [percent] chose the Brezhnev era, by 1999 support for Khrushchev's time had dropped to 30 [percent], whereas that for life under Brezhnev had risen to a remarkable 51 [percent].

== Honors and awards ==
- 2004 Pulitzer Prize for Biography or Autobiography
- 2004 National Book Critics Circle Award for Biography
- 2004 Wayne S. Vucinich Book Prize of the Association for Slavic, East European, and Eurasian Studies
- 2004 Robert H. Ferrell Book Prize of the Society for Historians of American Foreign Relations

== See also ==
- Gorbachev: His Life and Times

== Notes ==
- Conquest, Robert (2008) [1990]. The Great Terror: A Reassessment. Oxford: Oxford University Press. ISBN 978-0195317008.
