= Alexandre Sheldon-Duplaix =

French naval historian (born 1963)

- Born: 1963 (age 62–63)
- Occupation: naval historian

Alexandre Sheldon-Duplaix (born 1963) is a French naval historian.

== Early life ==
The son of an American father and a French mother, Alexandre Sheldon Duplaix has dual American and French citizenships. He graduated from the Paris Institute of Political Science (Diplômé de l'Institut d'études politiques de Paris) and holds an MA in history and two pre-doctoral dissertations in history and political science from the Sorbonne.

== Academic career ==
For twelve years until 1999, he worked as a naval analyst under contract with the French Navy before joining the naval section of French Defence Historical Service (Service historique de la Défense, Département Marine), located in the Château de Vincennes, near Paris. Since 2001, he has lectured on naval history at the French Joint Defense Staff College (Collège Interarmées de Défense) in Paris and at the Combat Systems and Naval Weapons School near Toulon (École des systèmes de combat et armes navales).

== Published works ==
- Lauro, Frédérique; Sheldon-Duplaix, Alexandre; Geneste, Pascal; France. Service historique de la marine (2003), État général des fonds privés de la Marine, Archives de la Défense (in French), Service historique de la Marine, ISBN 978-2-11-091849-9
- Sheldon-Duplaix, Alexandre (2006), Histoire mondiale des porte-avions : des origines à nos jours (in French), ETAI, ISBN 978-2-7268-8663-2
- Sheldon-Duplaix, Alexandre; Camus, David (2006), Les sous-marins : fantômes des profondeurs, Découvertes Gallimard, 490; Découvertes Gallimard.; Sciences et techniques (in French), Gallimard, ISBN 978-2-07-031469-0
- Huchthausen, Peter A; Sheldon-Duplaix, Alexandre (2009), Hide and seek : the untold story of Cold War espionage at sea, Wiley, ISBN 0-471-78530-X
