= Chen Jian (academic) =

Chinese historian

- 陈兼
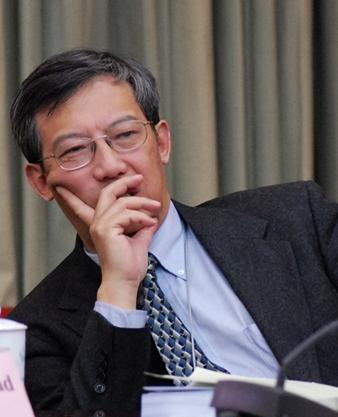
- Education: Southern Illinois University; East China Normal University; Fudan University
- Occupations: Hu Shih Professor of History and China-US Relations
- Employer: Cornell University

Chen Jian (Chinese: 陈兼; pinyin: Chén Jiān; born 1952) is a Chinese historian who holds the Hu Shih emeritus professorship of History and China-US Relations at Cornell University. His specialties include modern Chinese history, the history of Chinese-American relations, and Cold War international history. He is also Zijiang Distinguished Visiting professor at East China Normal University and Distinguished Global Network Professor of History at New York University Shanghai.

Chen Jian has held the Philippe Roman Chair in History and International Affairs at LSE IDEAS (2008–2009), where he remains a Senior Fellow, and was a research scholar from 2009 to 2013 at the University of Hong Kong. He was also a Global Fellow of the Woodrow Wilson Center (2013–2014), where he has been a Senior Scholar since 2005. He has also been the Zijiang Distinguished Visiting professor at East China Normal University since 2000.

Professor Chen received an M.A. from Fudan University and East China Normal University in 1982 and his Ph.D. from Southern Illinois University in 1990.

== Awards and honors ==
Chen Jian was the recipient of the Jeffrey Sean Lehman Grant for Scholarly Exchange with China, Cornell University, 2007. His other fellowships include Jennings Randolph Senior Fellowship for International Peace, United States Institute of Peace, 1996–1997 and the Norwegian Nobel Institute Fellowship, Oslo, Norway, 1993.

In 2005, he shared in the honors for an Emmy Award for Outstanding Achievement in News and Documentary Research for Declassified: Nixon in China.

== Contributions and reception ==
Chen's first major book was China's Road to the Korean War, which received much praise and was widely cited. Lucian Pye, writing in Foreign Affairs said Mao's China and the Cold War has "taken some giant steps toward advancing the West's understanding of Mao Zedong's policies during the Cold War." Pye praised Chen for correcting the view of Mao and Zhou Enlai as "relaxed and worldly wise" pragmatists, a view put forward by Richard Nixon and Henry Kissinger to justify the opening to China. In fact, Chen argues, "Mao was driven by ideology and insatiable ambition as he led the communists to power and sought Stalin's blessing for his leadership." Allen Whiting's review of it in Political Science Quarterly called Chen's work a "superb study."

== Books ==
- Zouxiang quanqiu zhanzheng zhilu: erci dazhan qiyuan yanjiu (The Road to a Global War: A Chinese Study of the Origins of the Second World War; Shanghai: Xuelin, 1989).
- China's Road to the Korean War: The Making of the Sino-American Confrontation (New York: Columbia University Press, 1994)
- Chinese Communist Foreign Policy and the Cold War in Asia: New Documentary Evidence, 1944-1950 (co-edited with Zhang Shuguang; Chicago: Imprint Publications, 1996)
- The China Challenge in the 21st Century: Implications for US Foreign Policy (Washington, DC: US Institute of Peace, 1998)
- Mao's China and the Cold War (Chapel Hill, NC: The University of North Carolina Press, 2001)
- Chen, Jian (2024). Zhou Enlai: A Life. Cambridge, Massachusetts; London, England: The Belknap Press of Harvard University Press. ISBN 9780674659582.
- The Great Transformation: China’s Road from Revolution to Reform (New Haven: Yale University Press, 2024), with Odd Arne Westad

== Selected articles and presentations ==
- — (2004). "The path towards Sino-American rapprochement, 1969-1972". Bulletin of the German Historical Institute. Supplement 1: 26–52.
- — (1998), Not Yet a Revolution:Reviewing China's "New Cold War Documentation", Cold War International History Conference, National Archives Describes and evaluates the "internal" (neibu) documents on Mao and his government published in the period of opening in the 1990s.
- — (2019), A Flawed Giant: Zhou Enlai and China’s Prolonged Rise, Harvard Institute of Politics
