= Ira Chernus =

American historian

Ira Chernus (born October 29, 1946) is a journalist, author, and Professor Emeritus of Religious Studies at the University of Colorado Boulder. He received his Ph.D. in Religion from Temple University, specializing in the history of rabbinic Judaism. For much of his career, his academic writing focused on the foreign policy of US presidents. He has published books on Dwight Eisenhower and George W. Bush. As a journalist, he has written extensively on peace, war, foreign policy, and nationalism in the United States, as well as the Israel-Palestine conflict and U.S. Middle East policy. He has written often for the Huffington Post, CommonDreams, TomDispatch, AlterNet, Truthout, Foreign Policy In Focus, and Religion Dispatches. In 2012, he started a new blog, MythicAmerica, on the History News Network website and published online MythicAmerica: Essays. His recent writings on Israel, Palestine, and the U.S. are also collected on a separate blog. Many of his earlier writings can be found on his University of Colorado website. He has lectured in Lebanon, Finland, Australia, and Canada, as well as extensively throughout the United States. After retiring from academia, he created the website "In the Words of Walt Whitman: A Thematic Anthology."

== Selected bibliography ==
- Mysticism in Rabbinic Judaism (August 1981, Walter de Gruyter, ISBN 3-11-008589-5)
- Dr. Strangegod: On the Symbolic Meaning of Nuclear Weapons (June 15, 2006, University of South Carolina Press, ISBN 0-87249-484-5
- Eisenhower's Atoms for Peace (September 23, 2002, Texas A&M University Press, ISBN 1-58544-220-8)
- General Eisenhower: Ideology and Discourse (October 2002, Michigan State University Press, ISBN 978-0-87013-616-0)
- American Nonviolence: The History of an Idea (September 1, 2004, Orbis Books, ISBN 1-57075-547-7)
- Monsters to Destroy: The Neoconservative War on Terror and Sin (September 30, 2006, Paradigm Publishers, ISBN 978-1-59451-276-6)
- Apocalypse Management: Eisenhower and the Discourse of National Insecurity (February 4, 2008, Stanford University Press, ISBN 978-0-8047-5807-9)
