= Bruce A. McConachie =

US historian of theatre and film

- Occupations: Theatre historian, academic, director, actor
- Awards: Barnard Hewitt Award; ASTR Distinguished Scholar Award (2011)

Academic background
- Education: University of Minnesota (MFA); University of Wisconsin (PhD)

Academic work
- Discipline: Theatre history
- Sub-discipline: American theatre, historiography of performance, cognitive approaches to performance
- Institutions: College of William & Mary; University of Pittsburgh
- Notable works: Melodramatic Formations (1992); American Theater in the Culture of the Cold War (2003); Theatre Histories: An Introduction (2006, co-author)

Bruce A. McConachie is a United States historian of theatre and film and emeritus professor of Theatre Arts at the University of Pittsburgh. In his early work, he focused on the nineteenth century American melodrama and the historiography of performance. He then studied the American theatre of the Cold War period. In his later work, he applied the cognitive and evolutionary sciences to theatre, performance and film.

McConachie taught at the College of William & Mary and later at Pittsburgh. His first two books were essay collections. Melodramatic Formations: American Theatre and Society, 1820-1870 advanced the concept of a theatrical formation to describe the mutual shaping of audiences and performance conventions. The book won the Barnard Hewitt Award. American Theater in the Culture of the Cold War used the metaphor of containment to read the drama of the period. In his work after 2006, he argued for grounding theatre studies in cognitive science and later in evolutionary theory. In this area, he wrote Engaging Audiences and Evolution, Cognition, and Performance, and edited The Routledge Companion to Theatre, Performance and Cognitive Science. Vanessa Ford and Carina Bartleet have described him as among the leading advocates of that approach. He is also one of the authors of the survey textbook Theatre Histories: An Introduction (2006).

McConachie was president of the American Society for Theatre Research from 2000 to 2003 and received its Distinguished Scholar Award in 2011. He also worked as a director and actor, staging productions at William and Mary and directing in the inaugural season of the Virginia Shakespeare Festival in 1978.

== Career ==
McConachie holds an MFA from the University of Minnesota and a PhD from the University of Wisconsin. He joined Wisconsin as a doctoral candidate in theatre and drama in 1973, drawn there by the work of Esther Jackson. He identified her course on theatre and society as his reason for choosing the university. In the autumn of 1973, he made his Madison stage debut in the University Theater's production of Feydeau's A Flea in Her Ear at the Wisconsin Union Theater. He played the double role of Chandebise and Poche. He directed Madison Theatre in the Park the next summer. In February 1975 he appeared in Ronald Ribman's The Journey of the Fifth Horse at the Vilas Hall Thrust Theatre.

He joined the department of theatre and speech at the College of William & Mary in Virginia in 1976, where he was an assistant professor by 1980, an associate professor by the mid-1980s and professor of theatre and American studies by the mid-1990s. With the English professor Robert Scholnick he developed the curriculum and recruited faculty for the college's American Studies programme, established in 1982 as the first graduate course of study in the subject in Virginia. He moved to the University of Pittsburgh in 1997, where he chaired the Department of Theatre Arts from 2006 and retired as an emeritus professor at the end of December 2015. He was president of the American Theatre and Drama Society and later of the American Society for Theatre Research from 2000 to 2003. In the early 2000s he was among the collaborators on Virtual Vaudeville, a digital reconstruction of an 1895 vaudeville performance led by David Saltz of the University of Georgia, which let users watch from the position of spectators of differing social backgrounds.

=== Theatre practice ===
One of McConachie's earliest credits was his direction, at the University of Minnesota in May 1969, of David Ball's adaptation of Christian Dietrich Grabbe's Jest, Satire, Irony and Deeper Meaning. Before starting his doctoral study he acted in and directed productions at Grinnell College, the University of Minnesota and Emerson College in Boston, and performed with theatre companies.

In 1978 McConachie was company manager of the inaugural season of the Virginia Shakespeare Festival at William and Mary, whose director was the designer Jerry Bledsoe, and he directed the season's Romeo and Juliet. Three plays ran in rotation through the summer, and the company mixed hired professionals with performers drawn largely from the surrounding area.

His other productions at the college included Edward Albee's The American Dream and The Zoo Story in 1977, Georg Büchner's Woyzeck in 1979, for which he also chose the play and assembled its performance text from English translations, and in 1980 Waiting for Godot cast with women in the roles Beckett wrote for men.

From the early 1980s McConachie wrote a stage adaptation of Uncle Tom's Cabin. The finished play, Goin' Home to Freedom, was directed by Leslie Muchmore and opened on 20 February 1986. McConachie cut Harriet Beecher Stowe's plot according to what he called usable history.

In October 1988 he opened the William and Mary Theatre season with The Threepenny Opera, relocating Brecht and Weill's work to contemporary homelessness as a play within a play. In it a group of street people staged the piece in front of an audience with the condition of the poor, so that each student played both a street person of 1988 and a character in Brecht's London. He said the aim was to extend Brecht's satire to present American targets, mainly what he saw as a growing indifference to the poor and homeless in large cities. He cast men in the roles of prostitutes and women as the gangsters.

In 1995 McConachie began a theatre project at William and Mary drawing on local memory of segregation in Williamsburg and the civil rights era. It opened in September 1995 with performances of Junebug/Jack by Roadside Theater and the Junebug Theater Project. Afterwards the audience members were invited into story circles to share their own experiences of the period. The stories collected were developed into a William and Mary Theatre production, Walk Together Children, which McConachie staged with student actors in 1996.

He continued to perform and direct during his eighteen years at Pittsburgh, acting with regional companies including Quantum Theatre and the Unseem'd Shakespeare Company, and directing Chekhov's Uncle Vanya at the university, American Humbug for the Three Rivers Arts Festival and A Streetcar Named Desire at Queen's University Belfast.

== Works and publications ==
McConachie has written on nineteenth century American melodrama and on the historiography of performance, and on the American theatre of the Cold War period. From the early 2000s he argued that theatre and performance studies should be grounded in the cognitive and, later, the evolutionary sciences. Vanessa Ford and Carina Bartleet have each described him as a leading advocate of the approach.

=== Theatre for Working-Class Audiences ===
McConachie's first book was Theatre for Working-Class Audiences in the United States, 1830-1980. It was a collection of thirteen essays co-edited with Daniel Friedman. He added an essay of his own to the book. Rather than assessing theatre primarily in terms of artistic merit, the editors focused on the social groups served by particular theatres. They defined the working class broadly as those who sell their labour without controlling the institutions that employ them. In his own chapter, McConachie linked apocalyptic melodrama at Bowery playhouses to preindustrial rioting in antebellum New York. He argued that the catharsis of staged vengeance paralleled that of the theatre riots of 1834 and 1849.

Mari Kathleen Fielder called the book a seminal recovery of neglected material. However, she found several essays descriptive rather than interpretive. Thomas A. Greenfield wrote that the book was a superb and important collection but objected that the editors overstated the field's neglect. He also felt that the absence of an essay on black workers' theatre was a serious omission. Michael Fellman found the introduction dogmatic in treating agitprop as the authentic form of working class theatre. However, he singled out McConachie's essay as the one place where it becomes clear how far the theatre discussed belonged to workers rather than being aimed at them.

=== Interpreting the Theatrical Past ===
McConachie co-edited Interpreting the Theatrical Past: Essays in the Historiography of Performance with Thomas Postlewait. It was published in 1989 and gathered essays on research practice and presuppositions in theatre history. The project began at a meeting of the American Society for Theatre Research in the mid-1980s. His own essay proposed cultural hegemony as a basis for writing theatre history, bringing together Antonio Gramsci and Kenneth Burke to argue that valid claims about reality are reachable only through symbolic communication shared by culture and history. He took the argument and applied it to Dion Boucicault's plays of the 1850s. Timothy Murray grouped the essay with the politically engaged contributions to the volume but wrote that it passes over Burke's move away from Marxism. Rosemarie Bank thought that as applied to Boucicault it revealed little a historian of McConachie's standing could not have established without the theory. Both reviews were mixed on the collection. Bank wrote that she felt that most contributions illustrated existing practice instead of advancing method. Murray thought its strongest essays were the cross-disciplinary ones, and valued the way they complicated the claims of other contributors who were still trying to establish theatre history as an independent discipline.

=== Melodramatic Formations ===
In 1992, Melodramatic Formations: American Theatre and Society, 1820-1870 was published in Postlewait's Studies in Theatre History and Culture series. The book was published a decade after McConachie held a National Endowment for the Humanities grant to examine the relationship between antebellum melodrama and the values of its audiences. It advances a concept he terms a theatrical formation, which is an interactive account in which audiences shape dramatic styles and conventions while those performances in turn seek ways to please their public. The book divides the period into three overlapping phases, a paternalistic theatre which is controlled by a declining elite, a Jacksonian theatre, which is marked by yeoman independence and a theatre of middle class respectability. The book also distinguishes five varieties of melodrama: fairy-tale, heroic, apocalyptic, moral reform and sensation. The analysis draws on Raymond Williams's cultural materialism as well as Meadian sociology, materialist feminism, new historicism and Burke.

The book won the Barnard Hewitt Award. Reviewers praised its documentary details but questioned its interpretive reach. Benjamin McArthur called the study imaginative and impressively researched and placed it among the significant histories of the American stage. However, he objected to its Marxist premises. Laura McCall wrote that the book points in the opposite direction from Faye Dudden's account of women in the American theatre. Thomas E. Luddy found the study important but thought its criticism did not bring the period alive.

=== American Theater in the Culture of the Cold War ===
In 2003, American Theater in the Culture of the Cold War: Producing and Contesting Containment, 1947-1962 was published in the same series, which Postlewait edited. In the preface McConachie writes that he distrusts the usual approach of interpreting plays and their reception by placing them in their social and political context. The primary framework is the cognitive linguistics of George Lakoff and Mark Johnson, from which he takes the view that concepts arise from bodily experience. Alongside plays the book analyses a number of films, and its material extends to musical theatre and dance and to the influence of radio and photography on stage practice.

Reviewing the book Christopher Bigsby wrote that Cold War anxiety in the theatre had not been examined with comparable originality before this. However, he pointed out that the book does not pursue the covert involvement of the Central Intelligence Agency or organised efforts to suppress American plays. Dorothy Chansky praised the reading of Death of a Salesman as radio-influenced theatre. However, she argued that the audience emerges as compliant and undifferentiated. She also wrote that in the book both the production and the contesting of containment occur among theatre artists.

=== Cognitive and evolutionary approaches ===
From 2006 McConachie's work turned to the relationship between performance and the cognitive and evolutionary sciences. He organised a conference on cognitive science and theatre at Pittsburgh and in 2007 began co-editing Palgrave Macmillan's Cognitive Studies in Literature and Performance series with Blakey Vermeule. More than twenty volumes have been published in the series. He co-edited Performance and Cognition: Theatre Studies and the Cognitive Turn with F. Elizabeth Hart for Routledge in 2006. In the book, the editors challenged the assumptions they considered inadequate to the field and proposed cognitive approaches instead. In his preface McConachie wrote that cognitive psychology and neuroscience should replace the theories that then dominated the field such as Saussurean semiotics and the psychoanalytic theories of Freud and Lacan. He described the assumptions behind those approaches as scientifically out of date. His own chapter in the book made the case that cognitive theory explains how audiences respond to theatre better than psychoanalysis does, using the wench acts of the 1840s and 1850s as its example. Yanna Popova reviewed the book and called it a bridge between cognitive scientists and theatre scholars. Mark Pizzato called it groundbreaking but held that McConachie's chapter misrepresents Freud and Lacan.

In the same series, Engaging Audiences: A Cognitive Approach to Spectating in the Theatre was published in 2008. It has three chapters and an epilogue. The first is on how the mind and brain work in general, the second on social cognition, and the third on how casting and the venue itself impact the way an audience watches. McConachie wrote the book around five plays he had directed or acted in himself: Oedipus Rex, Twelfth Night, Uncle Vanya, A Streetcar Named Desire and Top Girls. The book takes issue with semiotic accounts of theatre. McConachie writes that spectators do not just read the stage as a set of signs but that they arrive already capable of combining ideas. He questions whether audiences suspend disbelief in the way as claimed. He also rejects the idea of a firm line between nature and nurture. John Lutterbie reviewed the book and described it as a landmark in theatre history and the theory of audience reception. Vanessa Ford found it accessible. However, she felt that it left little room for disagreement among cognitive researchers themselves and that its model of a spectator watching a performer leaves out more participatory kinds of theatre. Reviewing the book, R. Remshardt wrote that he felt McConachie was occasionally too categorical and recommended the book for academic libraries.

Theatre & Mind was a short book published in Palgrave's Theatre & series in 2013. It argues that the mind and the theatre are both embodied and interactive, and is organized around acting and spectating. Its longest example is a reading of Tony Kushner's Angels in America. McConachie has described the book as a summary of the field for undergraduates instead of an attempt at original scholarship. In a review of the book, Shawna Mefferd Carroll called it an effective primer. However, she wrote that the network of performance it describes resembles the poststructuralist thinking the book asks readers to leave behind. Carina Bartleet felt it was successful both as an introduction and as a commentary for readers already working in the field. K. Tancheva was more reserved in her review. She argued that the book mostly restates what practitioners had long known. She also added that a volume of its length could not make the case for displacing semiotic and poststructuralist accounts.

Evolution, Cognition, and Performance was published by Cambridge University Press in 2015. It argues that performance is the activity from which theatre, ritual and sport all emerged as human beings evolved, and that performance studies should be rebuilt on that footing. McConachie works within the framework known as enaction, and sets his account against those of Lacan, Foucault and Saussure. The five chapters begin with performance as an outgrowth of play in mammals. They then take up Christopher Boehm on the evolution of egalitarianism and Edwin Hutchins on cultural-cognitive ecosystems, and end with an ethics for performance studies drawn from Darwin, Dewey and Philip Kitcher. Two extended examples run through the book: Nelson Mandela's 1994 address to the South African parliament, and Angels in America. Jessica M. Beck found the book ambitious and rigorous, but thought its opening chapters unselective and hard going, and said it came together only in the final two. David Andrews made the same structural criticism. He also wrote that enaction rests partly on informed guesswork. He wrote that the book sometimes moves from that caution into confidence, a risk he described as general to biocultural scholarship.

=== Theatre Histories ===
McConachie is also one of the authors of Theatre Histories: An Introduction, a survey textbook published by Routledge in 2006. It was co-authored with Phillip B. Zarrilli, Gary Jay Williams and Carol Fisher Sorgenfrei. It is arranged in four parts: performance before 1600, theatre and print cultures to 1900, modern media cultures to 1970, and global communications from 1950. Noreen C. Barnes and Aaron D. Anderson called the first edition ambitious and successful, and reported adopting it as a graduate text. They wrote that its examples reflect the authors' own specialisms. Because of that, Asian theatre carries the weight of the non-Western material while Latin America and Africa appear through ritual. They also listed production faults such as misspelled names and poor illustrations. Katherine Newey called it an extraordinary undertaking and welcomed its use of performance studies to write theatre history. However, she questioned whether in displacing a Western account of what counts as legitimate theatre the book puts another universalism in its place, one in which the performance traditions of the world become readable only through late twentieth century Western ideas.

== Awards ==
- 1981 - Research grant, National Endowment for the Humanities
- 1993 - Barnard Hewitt Award, American Society for Theatre Research, for Melodramatic Formations
- 2011 - Distinguished Scholar Award, American Society for Theatre Research

== Bibliography ==
=== Books ===
- McConachie, Bruce A. (1992). Melodramatic Formations: American Theatre and Society, 1820-1870. Iowa City: University of Iowa Press. ISBN 0-87745-359-4.
- McConachie, Bruce (2003). American Theater in the Culture of the Cold War: Producing and Contesting Containment, 1947-1962. Iowa City: University of Iowa Press.
- McConachie, Bruce (2008). Engaging Audiences: A Cognitive Approach to Spectating in the Theatre. Palgrave Macmillan.
- McConachie, Bruce (2013). Theatre & Mind. Palgrave Macmillan.
- McConachie, Bruce (2015). Evolution, Cognition, and Performance. Cambridge University Press.
- McConachie, Bruce (2021). Drama, Politics, and Evolution: Cliodynamics in Play. Palgrave Macmillan. ISBN 978-3-030-81376-5.
- McConachie, Bruce (2025). Biocultural Ethics and Hollywood Climate Movies, 2004-2024. Ethics International Press. ISBN 978-1-83711-286-9.
