= Bibliography of the Chinese Civil War and Nationalist era =

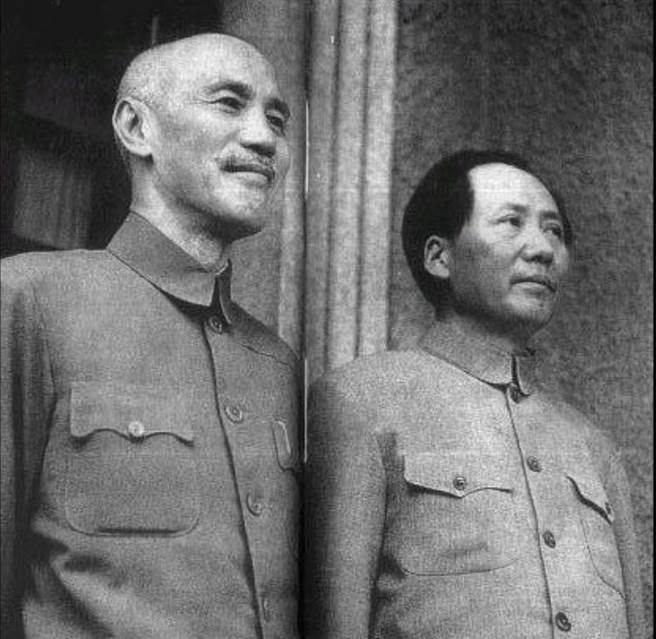
- Chiang Kai-shek and Mao Zedong in Chongqing, 1945
- Subject: Chinese Civil War; Nationalist government
- Scope: Books, journal articles, primary sources
- Period covered: 1927 – 1949
- Languages: English
- Related: Bibliography of Chinese history; Bibliography of the Cold War

Bibliography of the Chinese Civil War and Nationalist era is a list of English-language books and journal articles on the political history of China from the collapse of the First United Front in 1927 to the Communist victory on the mainland and the Nationalist retreat to Taiwan in 1949.

This bibliography contains academic-level English-language books (including translations) and journal articles, published mainly after World War II. (Note: Works published before World War II should be limited to areas where there are no significant post–World War II books on the subject, or where the work in question has significant historical merit.) Book entries may have references to reviews published in academic journals or major newspapers when these could be considered helpful. These reference reviews also function as a resource to find other works on this subject.

Works listed here are cited in the notes or bibliographies of scholarly sources. Each is published by an academic or major trade press, written by a recognized expert, or substantially reviewed in scholarly journals; borderline cases are omitted. A selection of primary sources is included. Many of the books below carry their own bibliographies; see Further reading section for longer ones, and External links section for historical sites and museums.

Citations follow APA style. (Note: Entries are in plain text APA 7 format without templates; templates are used only for reviews and notes.) Books have citations to academic journal or mainstream published reviews when available. For books only partly about the subject, relevant chapter or section titles are given where useful and available. Translators of the original-language edition are included when possible. In cases where a title or name has appeared with more than one English spelling, the most recent published form is used and a footnote documents any earlier title under which the work appeared.

== General surveys ==
- Bianco, L. (1971). Origins of the Chinese Revolution, 1915–1949 (M. Bell, Trans.). Stanford University Press. (Original work published 1967)
- Eastman, L. E., Ch'en, J., Pepper, S., & Van Slyke, L. P. (1991). The Nationalist era in China, 1927–1949. Cambridge University Press.
- Fairbank, J. K. (Ed.). (1983). The Cambridge history of China: Vol. 12. Republican China, 1912–1949, part 1. Cambridge University Press.
- Fairbank, J. K., & Feuerwerker, A. (Eds.). (1986). The Cambridge history of China: Vol. 13. Republican China, 1912–1949, part 2. Cambridge University Press.
- Paine, S. C. M. (2012). The wars for Asia, 1911–1949. Cambridge University Press.
- Sheridan, J. E. (1975). China in disintegration: The Republican era in Chinese history, 1912–1949. Free Press.
- Spence, J. D. (1990). The search for modern China. W. W. Norton.
- van de Ven, H. (2003). War and nationalism in China, 1925–1945. RoutledgeCurzon.
- van de Ven, H. (2017). China at war: Triumph and tragedy in the emergence of the new China, 1937–1952. Profile Books.

== Works about the Communists ==
- Apter, D. E., & Saich, T. (1994). Revolutionary discourse in Mao's republic. Harvard University Press.
- Averill, S. C. (2006). Revolution in the highlands: China's Jinggangshan base area. Rowman & Littlefield.
- Cheek, T. (1984). The fading of wild lilies: Wang Shiwei and Mao Zedong's Yan'an talks in the first CPC rectification movement. The Australian Journal of Chinese Affairs, 11, 25–58. JSTOR 2158685
- Chen, Y. (1986). Making revolution: The Communist movement in eastern and central China, 1937–1945. University of California Press.
- Dai, Q. (1994). Wang Shiwei and "Wild lilies": Rectification and purges in the Chinese Communist Party, 1942–1944 (D. E. Apter & T. Cheek, Eds.; N. Liu & L. R. Sullivan, Trans.). M. E. Sharpe.
- DeMare, B. J. (2019). Land wars: The story of China's agrarian revolution. Stanford University Press.
- Esherick, J. W. (1994). Deconstructing the construction of the party-state: Gulin County in the Shaan-Gan-Ning Border Region. The China Quarterly, 140, 1052–1079. doi:10.1017/S0305741000052905
- Esherick, J. W. (2022). Accidental holy land: The Communist revolution in northwest China. University of California Press.
- Gao, H. (2018). How the red sun rose: The origin and development of the Yan'an Rectification Movement, 1930–1945 (S. Mosher & J. Guo, Trans.). Chinese University of Hong Kong Press. (Original work published 2000)
- Goodman, D. S. G. (2000). Revolutionary women and women in the revolution: The Chinese Communist Party and women in the War of Resistance to Japan, 1937–1945. The China Quarterly, 164, 915–942. doi:10.1017/S0305741000019238
- Goodman, D. S. G. (2000). Social and political change in revolutionary China: The Taihang base area in the War of Resistance to Japan, 1937–1945. Rowman & Littlefield.
- Harrison, J. P. (1972). The long march to power: A history of the Chinese Communist Party, 1921–72. Praeger.
- Hartford, K., & Goldstein, S. M. (Eds.). (1989). Single sparks: China's rural revolutions. M. E. Sharpe.
- Holm, D. (1991). Art and ideology in revolutionary China. Clarendon Press.
- Hunt, M. H. (1996). The genesis of Chinese Communist foreign policy. Columbia University Press.
- Johnson, C. A. (1962). Peasant nationalism and Communist power: The emergence of revolutionary China, 1937–1945. Stanford University Press.
- Kampen, T. (1989). Wang Jiaxiang, Mao Zedong and the "triumph of Mao Zedong-Thought" (1935–1945). Modern Asian Studies, 23(4), 705–727. doi:10.1017/S0026749X00010179
- Kataoka, T. (1974). Resistance and revolution in China: The Communists and the Second United Front. University of California Press.
- Keating, P. B. (1997). Two revolutions: Village reconstruction and the cooperative movement in northern Shaanxi, 1934–1945. Stanford University Press.
- Kim, I. J. (1973). The politics of Chinese communism: Kiangsi under the Soviets. University of California Press.
- Perry, E. J. (1980). Rebels and revolutionaries in north China, 1845–1945. Stanford University Press.
- Reardon-Anderson, J. (1980). Yenan and the great powers: The origins of Chinese Communist foreign policy, 1944–1946. Columbia University Press.
- Saich, T. (Ed.). (1996). The rise to power of the Chinese Communist Party: Documents and analysis. M. E. Sharpe.
- Salisbury, H. E. (1985). The Long March: The untold story. Harper & Row.
- Schwartz, B. I. (1951). Chinese communism and the rise of Mao. Harvard University Press.
- Selden, M. (1971). The Yenan way in revolutionary China. Harvard University Press.
- Service, J. S. (1974). Lost chance in China: The World War II despatches of John S. Service (J. W. Esherick, Ed.). Random House.
- Seybolt, P. J. (1986). Terror and conformity. Modern China, 12(1), 39–73. doi:10.1177/009770048601200102
- Shewmaker, K. E. (1971). Americans and Chinese Communists, 1927–1945: A persuading encounter. Cornell University Press.
- Shum, K.-K. (1988). The Chinese Communists' road to power: The Anti-Japanese National United Front, 1935–1945. Oxford University Press.
- Snow, E. (1937). Red star over China. Victor Gollancz.
- Stranahan, P. (1983). Yan'an women and the Communist Party. Institute of East Asian Studies, University of California.
- Stranahan, P. (1990). Molding the medium: The Chinese Communist Party and the Liberation Daily. M. E. Sharpe.
- Stranahan, P. (1998). Underground: The Shanghai Communist Party and the politics of survival, 1927–1937. Rowman & Littlefield.
- Teiwes, F. C. (1976). The origins of rectification: Inner-party purges and education before liberation. The China Quarterly, 65, 15–53. doi:10.1017/S0305741000031751
- Thaxton, R. A., Jr. (1997). Salt of the earth: The political origins of peasant protest and Communist revolution in China. University of California Press.
- Van Slyke, L. P. (1967). Enemies and friends: The united front in Chinese Communist history. Stanford University Press.
- Wou, O. Y. K. (1994). Mobilizing the masses: Building revolution in Henan. Stanford University Press.
- Yang, B. (1990). From revolution to politics: Chinese Communists on the Long March. Westview Press.

=== Establishment of the People's Republic of China ===
- Barnett, A. D. (1963). China on the eve of Communist takeover. Praeger.
- Bland, L. I. (Ed.). (1998). George C. Marshall's mediation mission to China, December 1945–January 1947. George C. Marshall Foundation.
- Borg, D., & Heinrichs, W. (Eds.). (1980). Uncertain years: Chinese-American relations, 1947–1950. Columbia University Press.
- Coble, P. M. (2023). The collapse of Nationalist China: How Chiang Kai-shek lost China's civil war. Cambridge University Press.
- Hinton, W. (1966). Fanshen: A documentary of revolution in a Chinese village. Monthly Review Press.
- Kurtz-Phelan, D. (2018). The China mission: George Marshall's unfinished war, 1945–1947. W. W. Norton.
- Lary, D. (2015). China's civil war: A social history, 1945–1949. Cambridge University Press.
- Levine, S. I. (1979). A new look at American mediation in the Chinese civil war: The Marshall mission and Manchuria. Diplomatic History, 3(4), 349–376. doi:10.1111/j.1467-7709.1979.tb00322.x
- Pepper, S. (1978). Civil war in China: The political struggle, 1945–1949. University of California Press.
- Stueck, W. (1984). The Wedemeyer mission: American politics and foreign policy during the Cold War. University of Georgia Press.
- Tsou, T. (1963). America's failure in China, 1941–50. University of Chicago Press.
- Westad, O. A. (1993). Cold War and revolution: Soviet-American rivalry and the origins of the Chinese Civil War, 1944–1946. Columbia University Press.
- Westad, O. A. (2003). Decisive encounters: The Chinese Civil War, 1946–1950. Stanford University Press.
- Yick, J. K. S. (1995). Making urban revolution in China: The CCP-GMD struggle for Beiping-Tianjin, 1945–1949. M. E. Sharpe.

== Works about the Nationalists ==
- Chang, K. (1958). The inflationary spiral: The experience in China, 1939–1950. Technology Press of Massachusetts Institute of Technology; Wiley.
- Ch'i, H. (1982). Nationalist China at war: Military defeats and political collapse, 1937–45. University of Michigan Press.
- Coble, P. M. (1980). The Shanghai capitalists and the Nationalist government, 1927–1937. Council on East Asian Studies, Harvard University.
- Coble, P. M. (1991). Facing Japan: Chinese politics and Japanese imperialism, 1931–1937. Council on East Asian Studies, Harvard University.
- Coble, P. M. (2023). The collapse of Nationalist China: How Chiang Kai-shek lost China's civil war. Cambridge University Press.
- Culp, R. (2007). Articulating citizenship: Civic education and student politics in southeastern China, 1912–1940. Harvard University Asia Center.
- Dirlik, A. (1975). The ideological foundations of the New Life Movement: A study in counterrevolution. The Journal of Asian Studies, 34(4), 945–980. JSTOR 2054509
- Eastman, L. E. (1972). Fascism in Kuomintang China: The Blue Shirts. The China Quarterly, 49, 1–31. doi:10.1017/S0305741000036481
- Eastman, L. E. (1984). Seeds of destruction: Nationalist China in war and revolution, 1937–1949. Stanford University Press.
- Ferlanti, F. (2010). The New Life Movement in Jiangxi Province, 1934–1938. Modern Asian Studies, 44(5), 961–1000. doi:10.1017/S0026749X0999028X
- Fung, E. S. K. (2000). In search of Chinese democracy: Civil opposition in Nationalist China, 1929–1949. Cambridge University Press.
- Lai, T.-h., Myers, R. H., & Wei, W. (1991). A tragic beginning: The Taiwan uprising of February 28, 1947. Stanford University Press.
- Lary, D. (1974). Region and nation: The Kwangsi clique in Chinese politics, 1925–1937. Cambridge University Press.
- Lin, H. (2016). Accidental state: Chiang Kai-shek, the United States, and the making of Taiwan. Harvard University Press.
- Phillips, S. E. (2003). Between assimilation and independence: The Taiwanese encounter Nationalist China, 1945–1950. Stanford University Press.
- Wakeman, F., Jr. (1988). Policing modern Shanghai. The China Quarterly, 115, 408–440. doi:10.1017/S0305741000027508
- Wakeman, F., Jr. (1995). Policing Shanghai, 1927–1937. University of California Press.
- Wei, W. (1985). Counterrevolution in China: The Nationalists in Jiangxi during the Soviet period. University of Michigan Press.
- Wu, T. (1976). The Sian Incident: A pivotal point in modern Chinese history. Center for Chinese Studies, University of Michigan.
- Zanasi, M. (2006). Saving the nation: Economic modernity in Republican China. University of Chicago Press.

=== Establishment of the Republic of China ===
- Eastman, L. E. (1974). The abortive revolution: China under Nationalist rule, 1927–1937. Harvard University Press.
- Isaacs, H. R. (1961). The tragedy of the Chinese Revolution (2nd rev. ed.). Stanford University Press.
- Jordan, D. A. (1976). The Northern Expedition: China's national revolution of 1926–1928. University Press of Hawaii.
- Kirby, W. C. (1984). Germany and Republican China. Stanford University Press.
- Strauss, J. C. (1998). Strong institutions in weak polities: State building in Republican China, 1927–1940. Oxford University Press.
- Tien, H. (1972). Government and politics in Kuomintang China, 1927–1937. Stanford University Press.
- Wilbur, C. M. (1984). The Nationalist revolution in China, 1923–1928. Cambridge University Press.

== Military history of the Civil War period ==
- Benton, G. (1992). Mountain fires: The Red Army's three-year war in South China, 1934–1938. University of California Press.
- Benton, G. (1999). New Fourth Army: Communist resistance along the Yangtze and the Huai, 1938–1941. University of California Press.
- Chassin, L. M. (1965). The Communist conquest of China: A history of the civil war, 1945–1949 (T. Osato & L. Gelas, Trans.). Harvard University Press.
- Dreyer, E. L. (1995). China at war, 1901–1949. Longman.
- Levine, S. I. (1987). Anvil of victory: The Communist revolution in Manchuria, 1945–1948. Columbia University Press.
- Lew, C. R. (2009). The third Chinese revolutionary civil war, 1945–49: An analysis of Communist strategy and leadership. Routledge.
- Tanner, H. M. (2013). The battle for Manchuria and the fate of China: Siping, 1946. Indiana University Press.
- Tanner, H. M. (2015). Where Chiang Kai-shek lost China: The Liao-Shen campaign, 1948. Indiana University Press.
- Westad, O. A. (2003). Decisive encounters: The Chinese Civil War, 1946–1950. Stanford University Press.
- Whitson, W. W., & Huang, C.-h. (1973). The Chinese high command: A history of Communist military politics, 1927–71. Praeger.
- Yu, M. (2006). The dragon's war: Allied operations and the fate of China, 1937–1947. Naval Institute Press.

=== China and World War II ===
- Mitter, R. (2013). Forgotten ally: China's World War II, 1937–1945. Houghton Mifflin Harcourt.
- Mitter, R. (2020). China's good war: How World War II is shaping a new nationalism. Harvard University Press.
- Mitter, R., & Moore, A. W. (2011). China in World War II, 1937–1945: Experience, memory, and legacy. Modern Asian Studies, 45(2), 225–240. doi:10.1017/s0026749x10000387
- Schaller, M. (1979). The U.S. crusade in China, 1938–1945. Columbia University Press.
- Sun, Y. (1993). China and the origins of the Pacific War, 1931–1941. St. Martin's Press.
- van de Ven, H. (2017). China at war: Triumph and tragedy in the emergence of the new China, 1937–1952. Profile Books.
- van de Ven, H., Lary, D., & MacKinnon, S. R. (Eds.). (2015). Negotiating China's destiny in World War II. Stanford University Press.
- Yu, M. (1996). OSS in China: Prelude to Cold War. Yale University Press.

=== Second Sino-Japanese War ===
- Barrett, D. P., & Shyu, L. N. (Eds.). (2001). Chinese collaboration with Japan, 1932–1945: The limits of accommodation. Stanford University Press.
- Brook, T. (2005). Collaboration: Japanese agents and local elites in wartime China. Harvard University Press.
- Ch'i, H. (1982). Nationalist China at war: Military defeats and political collapse, 1937–45. University of Michigan Press.
- Coble, P. M. (2003). Chinese capitalists in Japan's new order: The occupied lower Yangzi, 1937–1945. University of California Press.
- Coble, P. M. (2015). China's war reporters: The legacy of resistance against Japan. Harvard University Press.
- Duara, P. (2003). Sovereignty and authenticity: Manchukuo and the East Asian modern. Rowman & Littlefield.
- Fogel, J. A. (Ed.). (2000). The Nanjing Massacre in history and historiography. University of California Press.
- Fu, P. (1993). Passivity, resistance, and collaboration: Intellectual choices in occupied Shanghai, 1937–1945. Stanford University Press.
- Henriot, C., & Yeh, W.-h. (Eds.). (2004). In the shadow of the rising sun: Shanghai under Japanese occupation. Cambridge University Press.
- Hsiung, J. C., & Levine, S. I. (Eds.). (1992). China's bitter victory: The war with Japan, 1937–1945. M. E. Sharpe.
- Hung, C.-T. (1994). War and popular culture: Resistance in modern China, 1937–1945. University of California Press.
- Kushner, B. (2015). Men to devils, devils to men: Japanese war crimes and Chinese justice. Harvard University Press.
- Lary, D. (2010). The Chinese people at war: Human suffering and social transformation, 1937–1945. Cambridge University Press.
- Lary, D., & MacKinnon, S. R. (Eds.). (2001). Scars of war: The impact of warfare on modern China. University of British Columbia Press.
- MacKinnon, S. R. (2008). Wuhan, 1938: War, refugees, and the making of modern China. University of California Press.
- MacKinnon, S. R., Lary, D., & Vogel, E. F. (Eds.). (2007). China at war: Regions of China, 1937–1945. Stanford University Press.
- Mitter, R. (2000). The Manchurian myth: Nationalism, resistance, and collaboration in modern China. University of California Press.
- Muscolino, M. S. (2015). The ecology of war in China: Henan Province, the Yellow River, and beyond, 1938–1950. Cambridge University Press.
- Peattie, M., Drea, E., & van de Ven, H. (Eds.). (2011). The battle for China: Essays on the military history of the Sino-Japanese War of 1937–1945. Stanford University Press.
- Schoppa, R. K. (2011). In a sea of bitterness: Refugees during the Sino-Japanese War. Harvard University Press.
- Taylor, J. E. (2021). Iconographies of occupation: Visual cultures in Wang Jingwei's China, 1939–1945. University of Hawai'i Press.
- Wakeman, F., Jr. (1996). The Shanghai badlands: Wartime terrorism and urban crime, 1937–1941. Cambridge University Press.
- Yoshida, T. (2006). The making of the "Rape of Nanking": History and memory in Japan, China, and the United States. Oxford University Press.
- Young, L. (1998). Japan's total empire: Manchuria and the culture of wartime imperialism. University of California Press.

== Foreign relations ==
=== The Soviet Union ===
- Braun, O. (1982). A Comintern agent in China, 1932–1939 (J. Moore, Trans.). Stanford University Press. (Original work published 1973)
- Chang, K. (1989). Last chance in Manchuria: The diary of Chang Kia-ngau (D. G. Gillin & R. H. Myers, Eds.; D. Zen, Trans.). Hoover Institution Press.
- Garver, J. W. (1988). Chinese-Soviet relations, 1937–1945: The diplomacy of Chinese nationalism. Oxford University Press.
- Heinzig, D. (2004). The Soviet Union and Communist China, 1945–1950: The arduous road to the alliance. M. E. Sharpe. (Original work published 1998)
- Levine, S. I. (1987). Anvil of victory: The Communist revolution in Manchuria, 1945–1948. Columbia University Press.
- McLane, C. B. (1958). Soviet policy and the Chinese communists, 1931–1946. Columbia University Press.
- North, R. C. (1953). Moscow and Chinese Communists. Stanford University Press.
- Paine, S. C. M. (2012). The wars for Asia, 1911–1949. Cambridge University Press.
- Reardon-Anderson, J. (1980). Yenan and the great powers: The origins of Chinese Communist foreign policy, 1944–1946. Columbia University Press.
- Shen, Z., & Xia, Y. (2015). Mao and the Sino-Soviet partnership, 1945–1959: A new history. Lexington Books.
- Sheng, M. M. (1997). Battling Western imperialism: Mao, Stalin, and the United States. Princeton University Press.
- Westad, O. A. (1993). Cold War and revolution: Soviet-American rivalry and the origins of the Chinese Civil War, 1944–1946. Columbia University Press.
- Westad, O. A. (1997). Losses, chances, and myths: The United States and the creation of the Sino-Soviet alliance, 1945–1950. Diplomatic History, 21(1), 105–115. doi:10.1111/1467-7709.00055
- Westad, O. A. (Ed.). (1998). Brothers in arms: The rise and fall of the Sino-Soviet alliance, 1945–1963. Woodrow Wilson Center Press; Stanford University Press.
- Yang, K. (1992). The Soviet factor and the CCP's policy toward the United States in the 1940s. Chinese Historians, 5(1), 17–34. doi:10.1080/1043643X.1992.11876884

=== The United States ===
- Bland, L. I. (Ed.). (1998). George C. Marshall's mediation mission to China, December 1945–January 1947. George C. Marshall Foundation.
- Borg, D., & Heinrichs, W. (Eds.). (1980). Uncertain years: Chinese-American relations, 1947–1950. Columbia University Press.
- Buhite, R. D. (1973). Patrick J. Hurley and American foreign policy. Cornell University Press.
- Chen, J. (1994). China's road to the Korean War: The making of the Sino-American confrontation. Columbia University Press.
- Feis, H. (1953). The China tangle: The American effort in China from Pearl Harbor to the Marshall mission. Princeton University Press.
- Gallicchio, M. S. (1988). The Cold War begins in Asia: American East Asian policy and the fall of the Japanese empire. Columbia University Press.
- Hunt, M. H. (1996). The genesis of Chinese Communist foreign policy. Columbia University Press.
- Kahn, E. J. (1975). The China hands: America's Foreign Service officers and what befell them. Viking Press.
- Kurtz-Phelan, D. (2018). The China mission: George Marshall's unfinished war, 1945–1947. W. W. Norton.
- Levine, S. I. (1979). A new look at American mediation in the Chinese civil war: The Marshall mission and Manchuria. Diplomatic History, 3(4), 349–376. doi:10.1111/j.1467-7709.1979.tb00322.x
- Reardon-Anderson, J. (1980). Yenan and the great powers: The origins of Chinese Communist foreign policy, 1944–1946. Columbia University Press.
- Schaller, M. (1979). The U.S. crusade in China, 1938–1945. Columbia University Press.
- Service, J. S. (1974). Lost chance in China: The World War II despatches of John S. Service (J. W. Esherick, Ed.). Random House.
- Shewmaker, K. E. (1971). Americans and Chinese Communists, 1927–1945: A persuading encounter. Cornell University Press.
- Stueck, W. (1981). The road to confrontation: American policy toward China and Korea, 1947–1950. University of North Carolina Press.
- Stueck, W. (1984). The Wedemeyer mission: American politics and foreign policy during the Cold War. University of Georgia Press.
- Tsou, T. (1963). America's failure in China, 1941–50. University of Chicago Press.
- Tuchman, B. W. (1971). Stilwell and the American experience in China, 1911–45. Macmillan.
- Westad, O. A. (1997). Losses, chances, and myths: The United States and the creation of the Sino-Soviet alliance, 1945–1950. Diplomatic History, 21(1), 105–115. doi:10.1111/1467-7709.00055
- Yu, M. (1996). OSS in China: Prelude to Cold War. Yale University Press.

== Biographies ==
=== Miscellaneous ===
- Boorman, H. L. (Ed.). (1967). Biographical dictionary of Republican China (Vol. 1). Columbia University Press.
- Buhite, R. D. (1973). Patrick J. Hurley and American foreign policy. Cornell University Press.
- Gillin, D. G. (1967). Warlord: Yen Hsi-shan in Shansi Province, 1911–1949. Princeton University Press.
- Klein, D. W., & Clark, A. B. (1971). Biographic dictionary of Chinese communism, 1921–1965 (Vols. 1–2). Harvard University Press.
- Tuchman, B. W. (1971). Stilwell and the American experience in China, 1911–45. Macmillan.
- Wakeman, F., Jr. (2003). Spymaster: Dai Li and the Chinese secret service. University of California Press.
- Wou, Odoric Ying-Kwong; Wu P'ei-Fu (1978). Military in modern China: The career of Wu P'ei-Fu, 1916-39. Studies of the East Asian Institute, Columbia Univ. Folkestone: Dawson [usw.] ISBN 978-0-7081-0832-1.

=== Mao Zedong ===
- Kampen, T. (1999). Mao Zedong, Zhou Enlai and the evolution of the Chinese Communist leadership. NIAS Press.
- Pantsov, A. V., & Levine, S. I. (2012). Mao: The real story. Simon & Schuster.
- Rue, J. E. (1966). Mao Tse-tung in opposition, 1927–1935. Stanford University Press.
- Schram, S. R. (1967). Mao Tse-tung (Rev. ed.). Penguin Books.
- Schwartz, B. I. (1951). Chinese communism and the rise of Mao. Harvard University Press.
- Short, P. (1999). Mao: A life. Hodder & Stoughton.
- Womack, B. (1982). The foundations of Mao Zedong's political thought, 1917–1935. University Press of Hawaii.
- Wylie, R. F. (1980). The emergence of Maoism: Mao Tse-tung, Ch'en Po-ta, and the search for Chinese theory, 1935–1945. Stanford University Press.

=== Mao and Stalin ===
- Brandt, C. (1958). Stalin's failure in China, 1924–1927. Harvard University Press.
- Chen, J. (1994). China's road to the Korean War: The making of the Sino-American confrontation. Columbia University Press.
- Chen, J. (2001). Mao's China and the Cold War. University of North Carolina Press.
- Goncharov, S. N., Lewis, J. W., & Xue, L. (1993). Uncertain partners: Stalin, Mao, and the Korean War. Stanford University Press. doi:10.1515/9781503622111
- Heinzig, D. (2004). The Soviet Union and Communist China, 1945–1950: The arduous road to the alliance. M. E. Sharpe. (Original work published 1998)
- Jersild, A. (2014). The Sino-Soviet alliance: An international history. University of North Carolina Press.
- Li, H.-y. (2006). Mao and the economic Stalinization of China, 1948–1953. Rowman & Littlefield. doi:10.5771/9781461639107
- North, R. C. (1953). Moscow and Chinese Communists. Stanford University Press.
- Pantsov, A. (2000). The Bolsheviks and the Chinese Revolution 1919–1927. University of Hawai'i Press.
- Pantsov, A. V., & Levine, S. I. (2012). Mao: The real story. Simon & Schuster.
- Shen, Z. (2000). Sino-Soviet relations and the origins of the Korean War: Stalin's strategic goals in the Far East. Journal of Cold War Studies, 2(2), 44–68. doi:10.1162/15203970051032309
- Shen, Z. (2012). Mao, Stalin and the Korean War: Trilateral communist relations in the 1950s (N. Silver, Trans.). Routledge.
- Shen, Z., & Li, D. (2011). After leaning to one side: China and its allies in the Cold War. Woodrow Wilson Center Press; Stanford University Press.
- Shen, Z., & Xia, Y. (2015). Mao and the Sino-Soviet partnership, 1945–1959: A new history. Lexington Books. doi:10.5040/9781666999235
- Sheng, M. M. (1992). Mao, Stalin, and the formation of the Anti-Japanese United Front: 1935–37. The China Quarterly, 129, 149–170. doi:10.1017/s0305741000041266
- Sheng, M. M. (1997). Battling Western imperialism: Mao, Stalin, and the United States. Princeton University Press.
- Westad, O. A. (1993). Cold War and revolution: Soviet-American rivalry and the origins of the Chinese Civil War, 1944–1946. Columbia University Press. doi:10.7312/west90670
- Westad, O. A. (1997). Losses, chances, and myths: The United States and the creation of the Sino-Soviet alliance, 1945–1950. Diplomatic History, 21(1), 105–115. doi:10.1111/1467-7709.00055
- Westad, O. A. (Ed.). (1998). Brothers in arms: The rise and fall of the Sino-Soviet alliance, 1945–1963. Woodrow Wilson Center Press; Stanford University Press.

=== Chiang Kai-shek ===
- Ch'i, H. (1982). Nationalist China at war: Military defeats and political collapse, 1937–45. University of Michigan Press.
- Coble, P. M. (2023). The collapse of Nationalist China: How Chiang Kai-shek lost China's civil war. Cambridge University Press.
- Crozier, B., & Chou, E. (1976). The man who lost China: The first full biography of Chiang Kai-shek. Charles Scribner's Sons.
- Dirlik, A. (1975). The ideological foundations of the New Life Movement: A study in counterrevolution. The Journal of Asian Studies, 34(4), 945–980. JSTOR 2054509
- Eastman, L. E. (1974). The abortive revolution: China under Nationalist rule, 1927–1937. Harvard University Press.
- Eastman, L. E. (1981). Who lost China? Chiang Kai-shek testifies. The China Quarterly, 88, 658–668. doi:10.1017/s0305741000029416
- Eastman, L. E. (1984). Seeds of destruction: Nationalist China in war and revolution, 1937–1949. Stanford University Press.
- Fenby, J. (2003). Generalissimo: Chiang Kai-shek and the China he lost. Simon & Schuster.
- Fenby, J. (2004). Chiang Kai-shek: China's generalissimo and the nation he lost. Carroll & Graf.
- Huang, G. C. (2021). Chiang Kai-shek's politics of shame: Leadership, legacy, and national identity in China. Harvard University Asia Center.
- Pantsov, A. V. (2023). Victorious in defeat: The life and times of Chiang Kai-shek, China, 1887–1975 (S. I. Levine, Trans.). Yale University Press. (Original work published 2019)
- Tanner, H. M. (2015). Where Chiang Kai-shek lost China: The Liao-Shen campaign, 1948. Indiana University Press.
- Taylor, J. (2009). The generalissimo: Chiang Kai-shek and the struggle for modern China. Belknap Press of Harvard University Press.
- Wakeman, F., Jr. (1997). A revisionist view of the Nanjing decade: Confucian fascism. The China Quarterly, 150, 395–432. doi:10.1017/s030574100005253x

== Miscellaneous ==
- Chang, K. (1958). The inflationary spiral: The experience in China, 1939–1950. Technology Press of Massachusetts Institute of Technology; Wiley.
- Lary, D. (2015). China's civil war: A social history, 1945–1949. Cambridge University Press.
- Rawski, T. G. (1989). Economic growth in prewar China. University of California Press.
- Young, A. N. (1965). China's wartime finance and inflation, 1937–1945. Harvard University Press.
- Young, A. N. (1971). China's nation-building effort, 1927–1937: The financial and economic record. Hoover Institution Press.

== Historiography and memory ==
- Eastman, L. E. (1981). Who lost China? Chiang Kai-shek testifies. The China Quarterly, 88, 658–668. doi:10.1017/S0305741000029416
- Esherick, J. W. (1995). Ten theses on the Chinese Revolution. Modern China, 21(1), 45–76. doi:10.1177/009770049502100103
- Gillin, D. G. (1964). "Peasant nationalism" in the history of Chinese communism. The Journal of Asian Studies, 23(2), 269–289. JSTOR 2050137
- Heinzig, D. (1971). The Otto Braun memoirs and Mao's rise to power. The China Quarterly, 46, 274–288. doi:10.1017/S0305741000010699
- Saich, T., & van de Ven, H. (Eds.). (1995). New perspectives on the Chinese Communist revolution. M. E. Sharpe.
- Wakeman, F., Jr. (1997). A revisionist view of the Nanjing decade: Confucian fascism. The China Quarterly, 150, 395–432. doi:10.1017/S030574100005253X

=== Memory studies ===
- Coble, P. M. (2015). China's war reporters: The legacy of resistance against Japan. Harvard University Press.
- Denton, K. A. (2014). Exhibiting the past: Historical memory and the politics of museums in postsocialist China. University of Hawai'i Press.
- Fogel, J. A. (Ed.). (2000). The Nanjing Massacre in history and historiography. University of California Press.
- Huang, G. C. (2021). Chiang Kai-shek's politics of shame: Leadership, legacy, and national identity in China. Harvard University Asia Center.
- Mitter, R. (2003). Old ghosts, new memories: China's changing war history in the era of post-Mao politics. Journal of Contemporary History, 38(1), 117–131. doi:10.1177/0022009403038001967
- Mitter, R. (2020). China's good war: How World War II is shaping a new nationalism. Harvard University Press.
- Mitter, R., & Moore, A. W. (2011). China in World War II, 1937–1945: Experience, memory, and legacy. Modern Asian Studies, 45(2), 225–240. doi:10.1017/s0026749x10000387
- Sun, S. (2006). The Long March. HarperPress.
- Waldron, A. (1996). China's new remembering of World War II: The case of Zhang Zizhong. Modern Asian Studies, 30(4), 945–978. doi:10.1017/s0026749x00016851
- Yoshida, T. (2006). The making of the "Rape of Nanking": History and memory in Japan, China, and the United States. Oxford University Press.

== Primary sources ==
- Mao, T. (1961). Selected works of Mao Tse-tung (Vol. 4). Foreign Languages Press.
- Saich, T. (Ed.). (1996). The rise to power of the Chinese Communist Party: Documents and analysis. M. E. Sharpe.

=== Memoirs and personal accounts ===
- Belden, J. (1949). China shakes the world. Harper.
- Braun, O. (1982). A Comintern agent in China, 1932–1939 (J. Moore, Trans.). Stanford University Press. (Original work published 1973)
- Chang, K. (1989). Last chance in Manchuria: The diary of Chang Kia-ngau (D. G. Gillin & R. H. Myers, Eds.; D. Zen, Trans.). Hoover Institution Press.
- Chang, K.-t. (1971–1972). The rise of the Chinese Communist Party: The autobiography of Chang Kuo-t'ao (Vols. 1–2). University Press of Kansas.
- Chiang, K.-s. (1957). Soviet Russia in China: A summing-up at seventy. Farrar, Straus and Cudahy.
- Hinton, W. (1966). Fanshen: A documentary of revolution in a Chinese village. Monthly Review Press.
- Melby, J. F. (1968). The mandate of heaven: Record of a civil war, China 1945–49. University of Toronto Press.
- Service, J. S. (1974). Lost chance in China: The World War II despatches of John S. Service (J. W. Esherick, Ed.). Random House.
- Snow, E. (1937). Red star over China. Victor Gollancz.
- Stilwell, J. W. (1948). The Stilwell papers (T. H. White, Ed.). William Sloane Associates.
- Tong, T.-k., & Li, T.-j. (1979). The memoirs of Li Tsung-jen. Westview Press.
- Wedemeyer, A. C. (1958). Wedemeyer reports!. Henry Holt.
- White, T. H., & Jacoby, A. (1946). Thunder out of China. William Sloane Associates.

=== Government documents ===
- Bland, L. I. (Ed.). (1998). George C. Marshall's mediation mission to China, December 1945–January 1947. George C. Marshall Foundation.
- United States Department of State. (1949). United States relations with China, with special reference to the period 1944–1949. Government Printing Office.

== See also ==
- Bibliography of Chinese history
- Bibliography of Stalinism and the Soviet Union
- Bibliography of the Cold War
- Bibliography of the Soviet Union
- Bibliography of works about communism
- Bibliography of works by Mao Zedong
- Bibliography of World War II battles and campaigns in East Asia, South East Asia and the Pacific
- List of books about the Korean War
- Outline of the Chinese Civil War
- Timeline of the Chinese Civil War
