= Revolution and the People in Russia and China =

2008 book by S. A. Smith

Revolution and the People in Russia and China: A Comparative History
- Cover
- Author: Stephen A. Smith
- Language: English
- Series: The Wiles Lectures
- Subject: Labour history, Russian Revolution, Chinese Communist Revolution
- Genre: Non-fiction
- Publisher: Cambridge University Press
- Publication date: 2008
- Publication place: United Kingdom
- Media type: Print (hardcover and paperback), digital (e-book)
- Pages: 249
- ISBN: 978-0-521-88637-6
- Dewey Decimal: 947/.210841
- LC Class: HX311.5 .S63 2008

Revolution and the People in Russia and China: A Comparative History is a 2008 book by British historian Stephen A. Smith. The work grew out of the Wiles Lectures that Smith gave at Queen's University Belfast in 1998. The book compares peasants who migrated to Saint Petersburg between the 1880s and 1917 with those who migrated to Shanghai between the 1900s and the 1940s. The book examines how their respective ties to their native places, their sense of themselves as individuals, and their gender and national identities changed before the Russian and Chinese Communist revolutions and under the regimes that followed.

== Summary ==
Smith follows peasants who left the countryside for two industrial capitals, St Petersburg from the 1880s to 1917 and Shanghai from the 1900s to the 1940s, and asks how wage labour and city life changed the way they saw themselves. Smith sets out to bypass the "peasant-to-proletarian paradigm", in which the central question was whether migrants had become fully dependent on wages, and argues instead that their identities formed along several axes besides that of class and that "capitalist modernity provides a better optic than capitalist production" for studying them. The long introduction sets out the author's use of the terms modernity, class and identity, and places the study at the level of culture and individual agency rather than the "big structures, large processes and huge comparisons" of historical sociology; Smith states that the aim "is not to build an overarching explanatory model of revolution" but to build local arguments out of the primary sources. The two cities were chosen not as proxies for Russia and China but because of their atypicality, as places that served as symbols of modernity for the rest of each country. The author raises three main concerns:

1. the crisis of the dynastic old order
2. the transnational forces that carried Western technology, goods and ideas into both cities
3. and consumption, from clothing and furnishings to newspapers, pulp fiction and mass entertainment.

Four chapters each take up one identity and move back and forth between the two cities rather than treating them in turn, each closing with its own conclusions. Much of the argument is carried by short biographies of individual workers, drawn from memoirs and autobiographies in both languages, alongside newspapers, social surveys, archival documents, fiction and film. Migration could strengthen rather than dissolve the attachment to the home village. In St Petersburg, for instance, newcomers found work and lodging either through fellow-villagers (zemliaki) or cooperative work gangs (arteli). And in Shanghai native-place associations and regional networks controlled whole trades and restricted entry to them, and migrants from Subei were confined to the lowest-paid work. Against the claim, associated with the sociologist Neil Smelser, that revolutionary movements recruit most readily among people cut loose from old social ties, Smith argues that such ties could be put to political use: in 1917 the Petrograd associations of migrants from the same district had at least 30,000 members and sent agitators to their home villages, which Smith calls "the nearest that Russia ever came to realizing Lenin's vision of a union of the proletariat and poor peasantry".

The chapter on individuality follows the "conscious" worker who developed a new sense of dignity and individual worth (n Russian this was known as 'lichnost') This was reflected in changes in religious practice, dress and leisure, and , above all, an intense desire to read and raise their intellectual level. In St Petersburg this was manifest in the rise of a popular press and fiction: the Gazeta Kopeika (Copeck Newspaper), the most popular newspaper among St Petersburg workers; detective stories about Nat Pinkerton, of which 6.2 million copies were published in Russia between 1907 and 1915. In Shanghai, literacy was much lower but the desire to read was there, reflectedi in "Mandarin Duck and Butterfly" novels. In both cities the heightened sense of personal worth led to workers demanding polite forms of address and demands that management treat them "as people and not as things" (the 1905 Revolution in Russia) and not as ‘cattle and horses’ (Shanghai, 1925-27). This leads Smith, drawing on Nancy Fraser's concept of misrecognition, to argue that the assertion of individual dignity strengthened collective class identity rather than undermining it.

The chapter on gender treats the weakening of patriarchal authority in family and workshop as part of the crisis of the old regimes. Smith considers working-class masculinity, built on skill, drink, apprenticeship and the fraternity of the workshop in the Russian case; and in Shanghai on the loyalties cultivated by the Green Gang, He goes on to look at demands by women workers in strikes in the textile mills not only for improved wages and conditions but for an end to sexual harassment. More widely in society the figure of the "new woman" emerged in fiction and film, from Anastasia Verbitskaia's novel The Keys to Happiness to Ruan Lingyu's role in The New Woman. Smith discovers that real change in familial and sexual relations was "fairly limited", but that the crisis of patriarchy served as a trope through which the bankruptcy of the old regime could be imagined. The chapter on nation opens with Pyotr Struve's claim in 1918 that the Russian Revolution was "the first case in world history of the triumph of internationalism and the idea of class over nationalism and the idea of the nation", and with Chalmers Johnson's argument that the Chinese Communists' wartime resurgence rested on peasant nationalism rather than on class politics. In Shanghai hostility to Japanese and British mill-owners merged with labor grievances during the 1925 May Thirtieth Movement. Meanwhile the national products movement and widespread boycotts of foreign goods grew apace. This convergence created what Smith describes as a "class-inflected anti-imperialist nationalism." In Russia, workers shared in the patriotism of 1914 and the "revolutionary defencism" of 1917; but mounting hostility to the war generated a rhetoric that identified the true nation with the "toiling people" (trudovoi narod). National and class identities, Smith concludes, "were as often mutually reinforcing as mutually counterposed", and the opposition between them in 1917 was "much more a conjunctural phenomenon than an expression of the deep structure of Russian political culture".

The final chapter turns away from identities to focus on revolutions themselves. Smith argues that the Russian Revolution, made essentially in the cities, was the least typical of the century's Communist revolutions, "more like the revolutions of 1848 or the Paris Commune" than those that came later in China, Vietnam, Yugoslavia or Cuba. By contrast, the Chinese Communist Party came to power through coalition-building, armies and rural base areas, among them those of the New Fourth Army in the hinterland of Shanghai; in both countries war weakened had greatly the state. The second half of the chapter carries the four identities forward to 1941 in the Soviet Union and to the end of the Mao era in 1976 in the People's Republic. Both regimes restricted movement from country to town, through the internal passport reintroduced in the Soviet Union in late 1932 and the household registration system in China; Soviet family policy moved from the legalization of abortion in 1920 to its prohibition in 1936, while in China a new marriage law made marriage a matter of free choice between two individuals, but met resistance in the countryside; and individual aspiration was channelled into official models such as the soldier Lei Feng. Smith characterizes the Stalinist and Maoist regimes as "revolutions against socioeconomic backwardness" that pursued aims not radically different from those of the regimes they replaced, and that narrowed the range of identities open to working people. The book ends with the sentence "Communism, too, was a form of modernity."

== Reviews ==
Russianist Lewis H. Siegelbaum called the book "a remarkable achievement" but questioned why the label "working class" was kept at all when the weight of wage labour and capitalist production was downgraded, and found the text "dense and freighted" for readers who knew only one of the two fields. A glossary, a bibliography and a couple of maps, in the reviewer's view, would have helped specialists on both sides. The more serious reservation concerned "the tendency to cram Shanghai into the author's axes and grids", since the mass reader had been a minority phenomenon among that city's workers.

William G. Rosenberg described the volume as "brilliant" and its analysis as "subtle, beautifully crafted", and observed that each chapter could be read or taught on its own, the chapter on gender especially. Rosenberg considered the title "a bit misleading", since the book was not a comparative history of the two revolutions as such. In Rosenberg's view Smith was "too smart a historian" to claim that comparable circumstances simply produced comparable changes in identity, "but the result sometimes diminishes the strength of his argument". The review wished that the author had set aside, "just for a moment", an "admirable analytical circumspection" in order to say how far the changes described had shaped revolutionary change. Rosenberg named one of the very few neglected issues as whether the workers who took part in the revolutionary upheavals survived to represent the post-revolutionary generations.

The desirability of comparing the Russian and Chinese revolutions, according to Christopher Read, had "always outrun the capacity of scholarship", and Smith was one of "a tiny handful of scholars" able to work on both through their languages and primary sources. The reviewer found "stimulating ideas, absorbing information and challenging analyses" throughout and singled out "class-inflected anti-Imperialism" as "an excellent phrase". Christopher Read also noted how little room was left for labour, material interests and institutions such as soviets and factory committees, the themes of Smith's earlier history of Petrograd, and detected a retreat from capitalism as an explanation. The description of the Stalinist and Maoist regimes as revolutions against backwardness drew the objection that their differences mattered more than any common denominator, though the review closed by welcoming a book that would "set up stimulating and creative discussion".

In a brief Review, A. M. Berkowitz called the work "an illuminating comparative history" of the transformation of peasants into workers. Berkowitz credited Smith with going beyond earlier studies of factory production to take in nationalism, Western ideas of science, mass consumption and commercialized leisure, and judged the analysis "particularly interesting because it brings to light many points that can easily be missed in more traditional studies of 'proletarianization'", among them migrants' continuing ties to their places of origin. The notice recommended the book for upper-division undergraduates and above.

Russia–China comparative studies, Stephen R. MacKinnon wrote, had faded from fashion in the 1960s, and Smith "courageously returns to the subject" with a "masterful multi-archival study". MacKinnon called the introduction's summary of a vast literature "itself a tour de force" and recommended the book as a graduate-level reference guide to the modern social history of both countries, regretting for that reason the absence of a bibliography. The final chapter was less persuasive to MacKinnon, who found that its argument seemed "to wander and fall flat, with too many lines of comparison". Its closing claim, that military power from rural base areas rather than workers or peasants decided the revolutions, threatened in MacKinnon's view "to diminish the superb social history of the preceding chapters".

For Sarah Badcock, the book was "an erudite comparative history" by a scholar with research expertise in both fields, and "an engaging, well written and accessible work" that would be required reading for specialists and should also attract a wider audience. Badcock credited the biographical snippets from individual workers' lives with giving the reader a clear sense of individual identities. Smith, in Badcock's assessment, "bravely avoids generalisations" of the kind that tempt broad comparative studies, and the insistence on heterogeneity and uncertainty in individual lives made the study convincing.

Felix Wemheuer found that the book offered "an excellent overview of the latest research methods" in modern Russian and Chinese history, praised its "strong chapter on gender identities", and recommended it as a textbook for undergraduate courses. In Wemheuer's judgement, however, "the title of the book promises too much": Shanghai, unlike St Petersburg, had not been central to its country's revolution, whose "anvil of victory" was Manchuria. The reader was left wondering, the review argued, whether the migrants had played any important role in the revolutions. Set beside the comparative studies of Barrington Moore, Eric Wolf and Theda Skocpol, the book seemed to Wemheuer "written in a more careful way" and "less ambitious", but nonetheless "a solid comparison" of rural migrants' identities.

Praising the way Smith "gracefully alternates between micro and macro", Vincent Kelly Pollard described the author as "a diligent researcher" whose inferences rested on a broad range of primary and secondary sources. Pollard took issue with Smith's treatment as a "paradox" of the finding that radical anti-imperialism fostered class identity among Shanghai workers, arguing that Lenin, who saw imperialism as the highest stage of capitalism, would have found it unremarkable. The reviewer regretted that foreign-language titles in the footnotes were mostly left untranslated. Even so, Pollard considered the book "an antidote to level-of-analysis problems and overreliance on secondary sources" of the kind that weakened Theda Skocpol's comparative study of social revolutions, and expected researchers to appreciate its ample index.

Thomas P. Bernstein welcomed the book as, to the reviewer's knowledge, the first comparison of the two revolutions conducted "at the level of the individual", and pointed to Smith's rare fluency in both languages and decades of archival research. Bernstein admired the decision to make each chapter fully comparative, weaving between the two cities, though the result confronted readers with "a considerable challenge of digesting vast amounts of material". "Perhaps Smith exaggerates the weight given to worker nationalism in Russia", Bernstein suggested, and the post-revolutionary section struck the reviewer as "something of a preliminary cut", stopping oddly early in the Soviet case and leaving aside episodes such as the dispatch of some 18 million urban youths to the Chinese countryside. Bernstein proposed a second volume on identity under Stalin and Mao and concluded that the book was "an outstanding study that deserves a wide readership".

In Gerald Surh's judgement the book "may be the most thoroughgoing social history of Russia's and China's workers in revolution", and it was "certainly the most arresting, original, and stimulating treatment to appear recently". Surh called it "a tour de force in both its thoroughness and its critical imaginativeness", commending sources that ranged from recent monographs to literature, film and popular culture, and the adaptation of the concept of misrecognition to reconcile individual and class identities. On gender, though, "very little results from the comparison", and the study showed a "'Russian' bias in privileging workers over peasants" that made China's side of the story a minority's tale. Surh nonetheless concluded that this "densely packed, polemical, methodologically sophisticated study provides a compelling answer" to the question of what remained of revolutions that had failed by the measure of their own utopian aims.

Sobhanlal Datta Gupta read the book as comparative in approach and historical in treatment but, in method, "grounded in cultural anthropology", and called it "a commendable work that deserves serious attention of all concerned scholars". Datta Gupta praised the "long, very well-written, scholarly introduction" and found convincing the argument that a sense of individual worth could bring workers together rather than divide them. The final chapter's claim that the revolutions could not be seen simply as worker–peasant alliances struck the reviewer as a "bold formulation". The review ended by describing "a refreshingly new analysis, full of deep insights", whose interpretations were "provocative as well as debatable".

Comparative histories of different countries "rarely work", Aaron B. Retish observed, tending towards schematic analysis or unbalanced comparison, but "this book proves the exception". Retish described "five lucid, creative chapters" and judged the one on national identity the book's "most complex and enriching". Among the questions the reviewer raised was how wartime mobilization, in the First World War and in China's long wars, had affected gender roles in factories and homes. Retish ranked the work as "the most insightful comparative history of revolution" since Florencia Mallon's 1995 comparison of peasants and the nation in Mexico and Peru, and wrote that it "should have a place on every historian's bookshelf".

In her review of the book in German, Eva-Maria Stolberg credited Smith with "a new, refreshing view" of the two revolutions and of the labour movement's part in them, and with skilfully combining the methods of political science and social history into a transnational and global historiography. Stolberg regarded Smith as an expert in the field and considered the choice of St Petersburg and Shanghai justified, since both cities had been hotbeds of an emerging revolutionary workforce. The reviewer found convincing the application of Benedict Anderson's idea of the imagined community to workers, and called the book a successful attempt to examine twentieth-century communism through the history of mentalities.

Junya Takiguchi said that the book was "far from simply an anthological collection" of Smith's earlier research, and that "few historians would be able to accomplish such a difficult and delicate task in such a superb and detailed way". Each chapter, in Takiguchi's reading, worked as an excellent paper with its own conclusion and could be read independently, without the book losing coherence. Takiguchi would have welcomed a fuller discussion of the theoretical framework behind the comparative approach, but concluded that the book "surely deserves a wide readership, of specialist and general interest readers alike".
