= United Fronts =

United Front may refer to either of two alliances of the Kuomintang (KMT) and the Chinese Communist Party (CCP):

- The First United Front, to end warlordism in China, formed in 1923 and collapsed in 1927
- The Second United Front, to resist the Japanese invasion during the Second Sino-Japanese War, which suspended the Chinese Civil War from 1937 to 1941
