= Bibliography of works about communism =

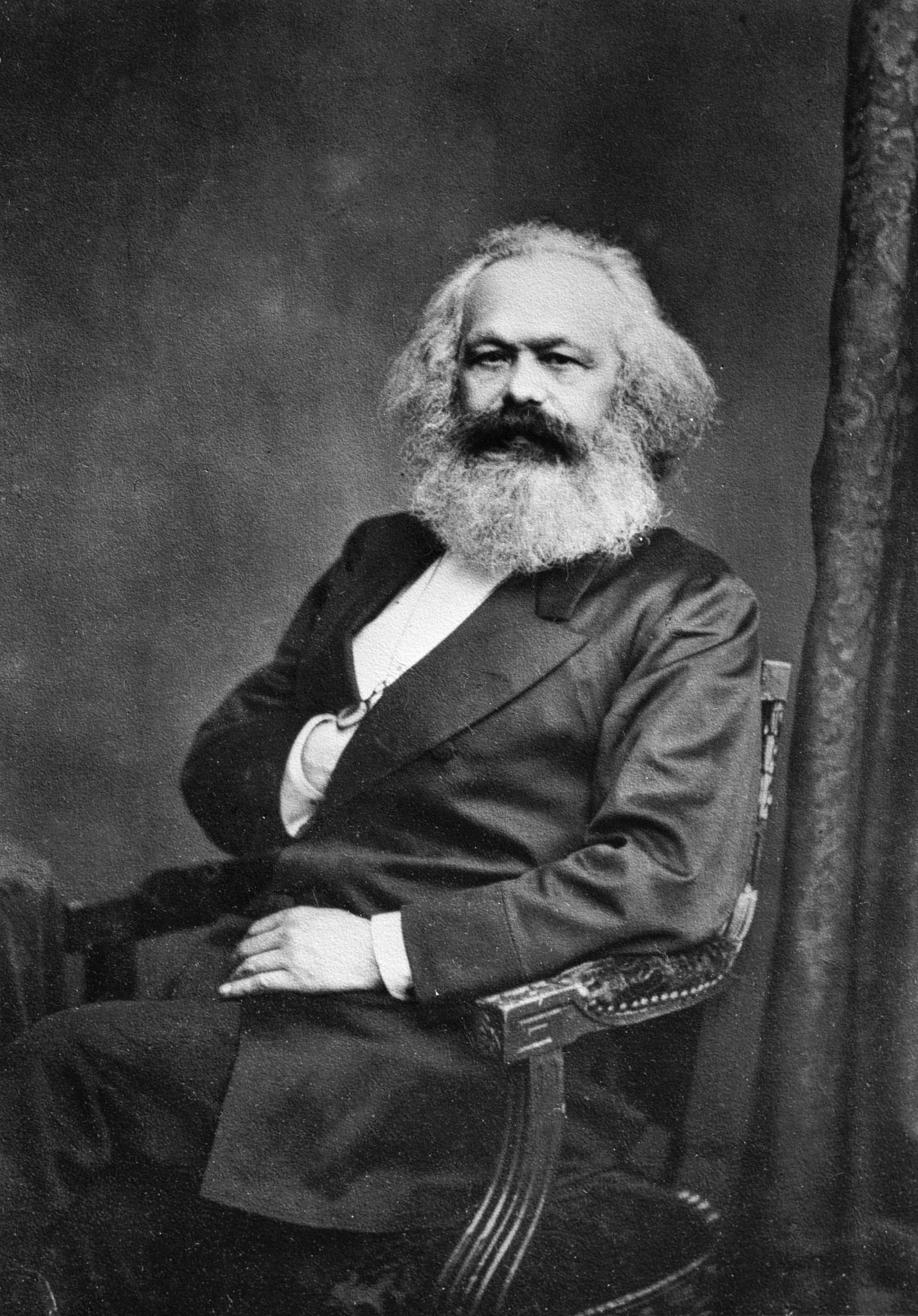
Karl Marx

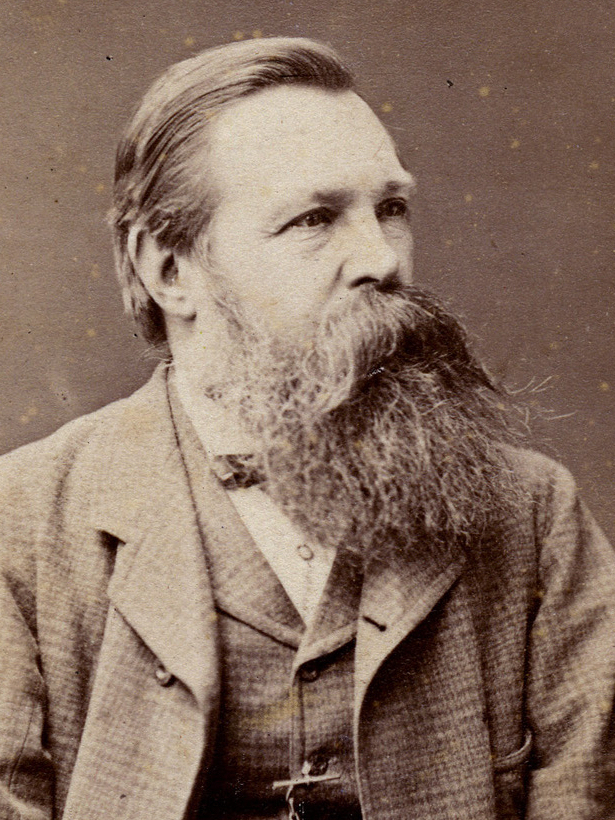
Friedrich Engels

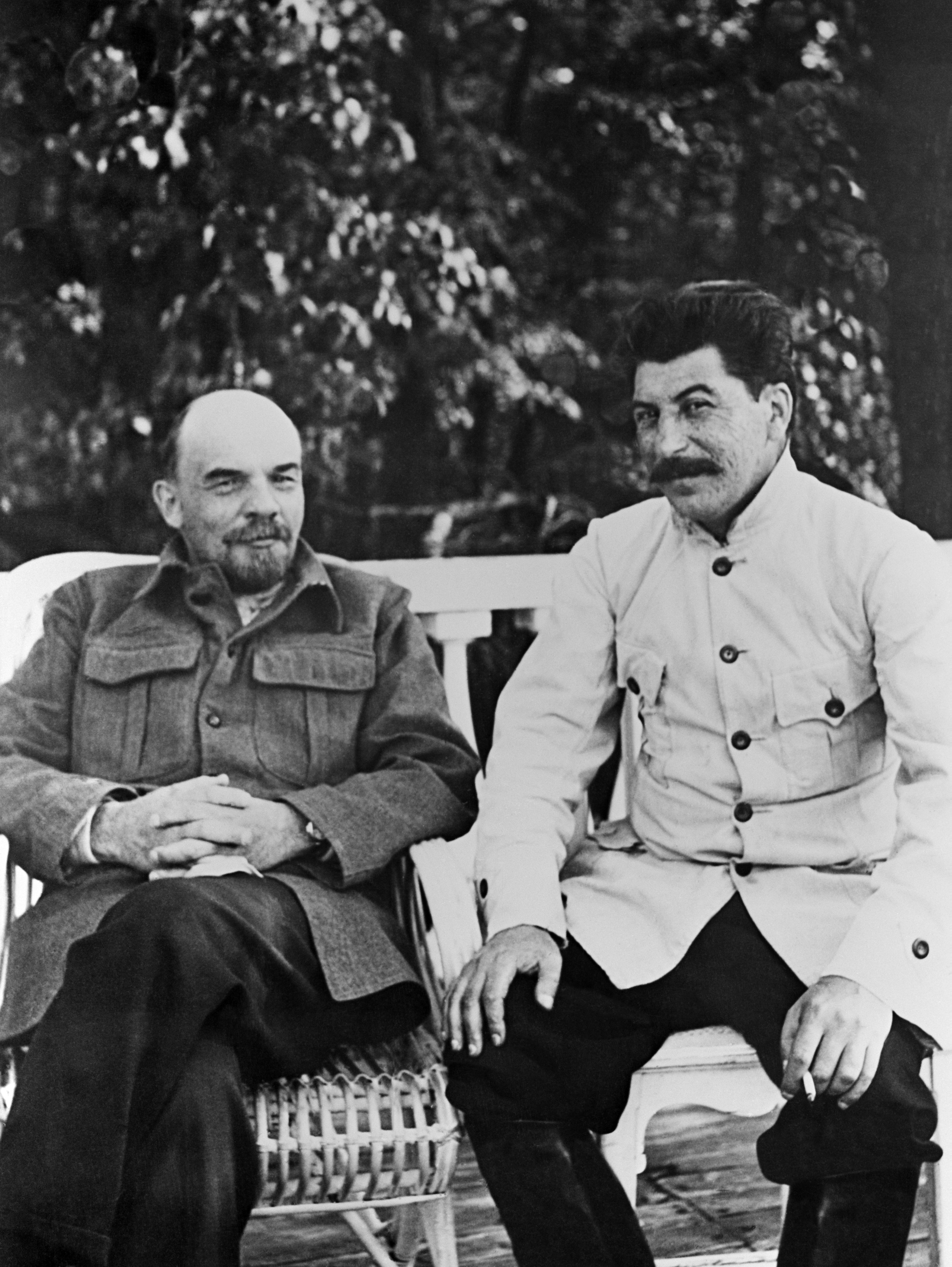
Vladimir Lenin and Joseph Stalin

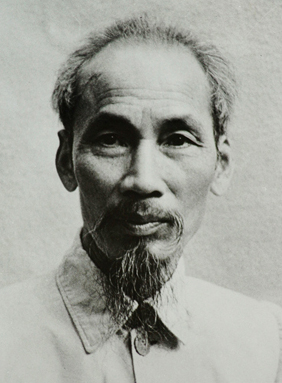
Ho Chi Minh

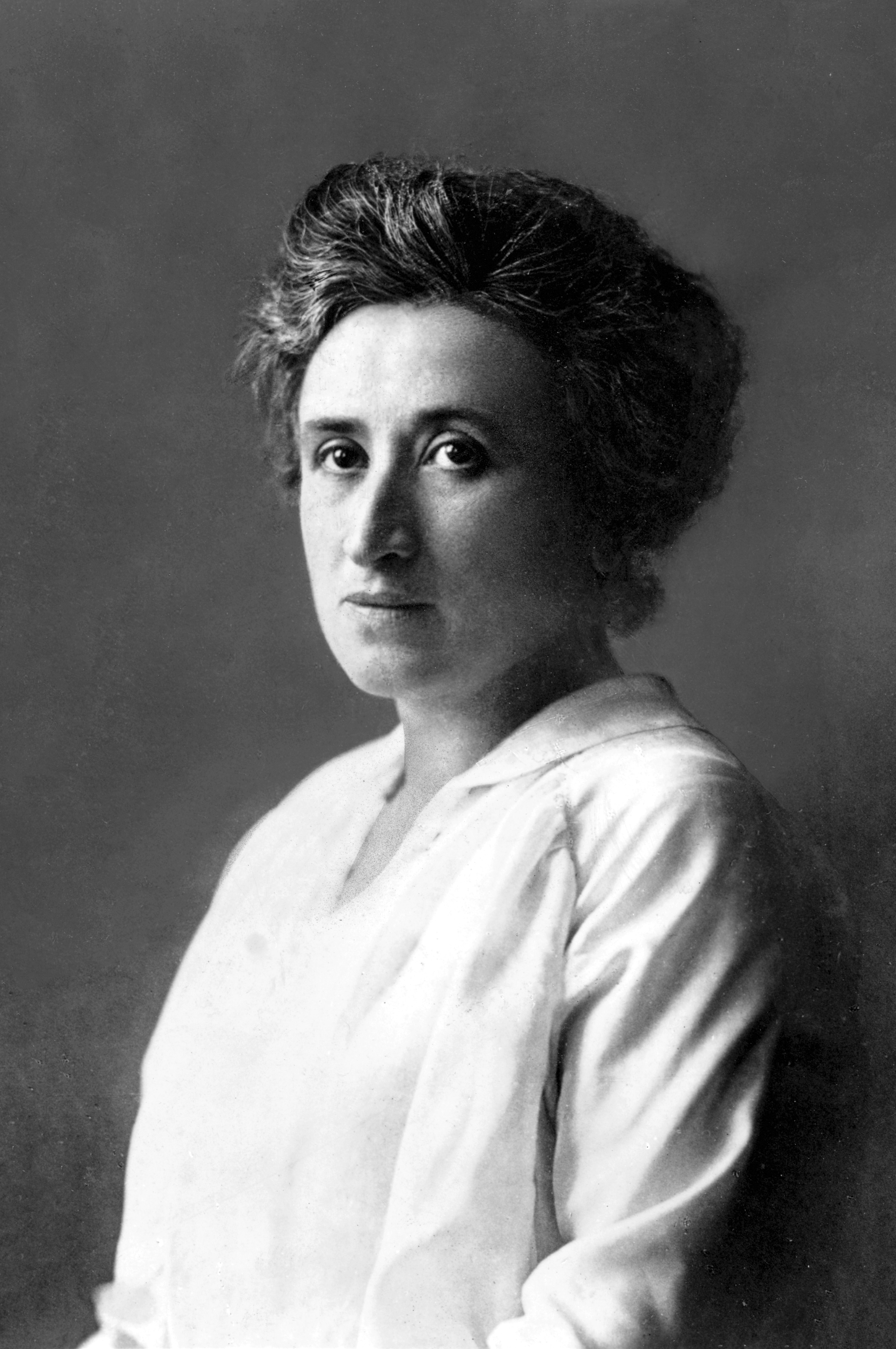
Rosa Luxemburg

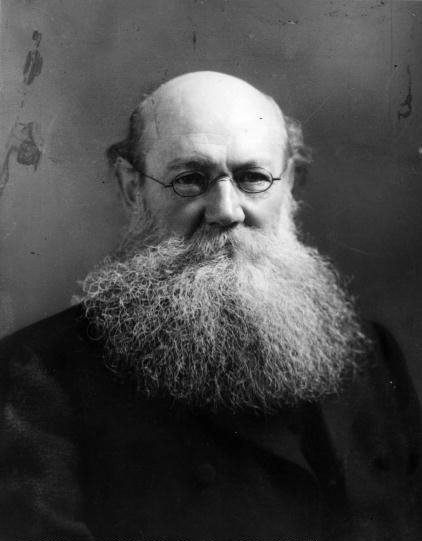
Peter Kropotkin

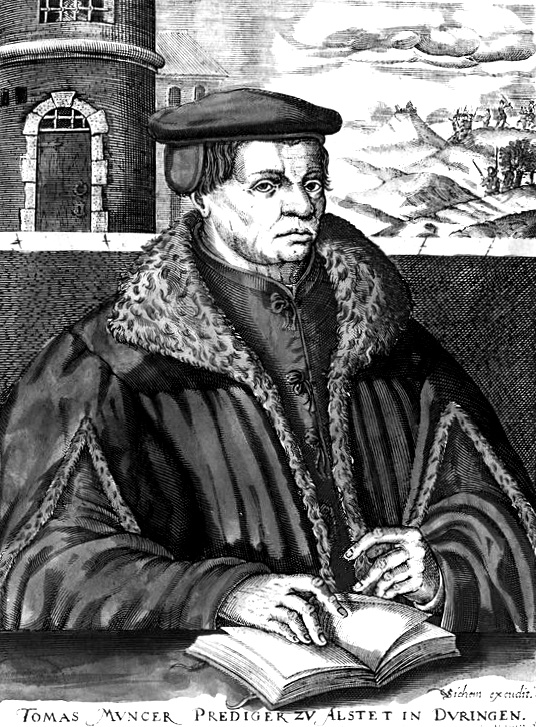
Thomas Muentzer

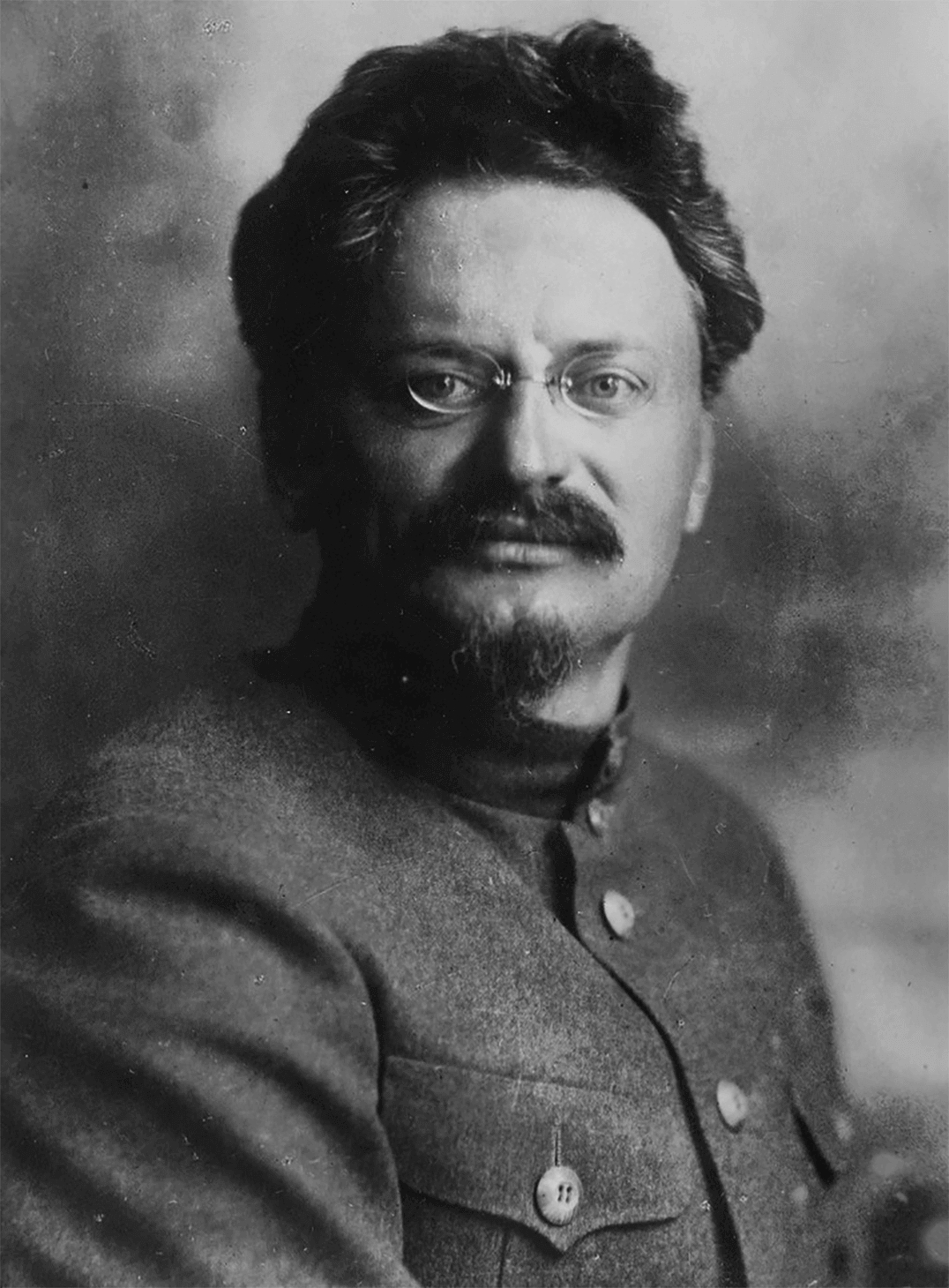
Leon Trotsky

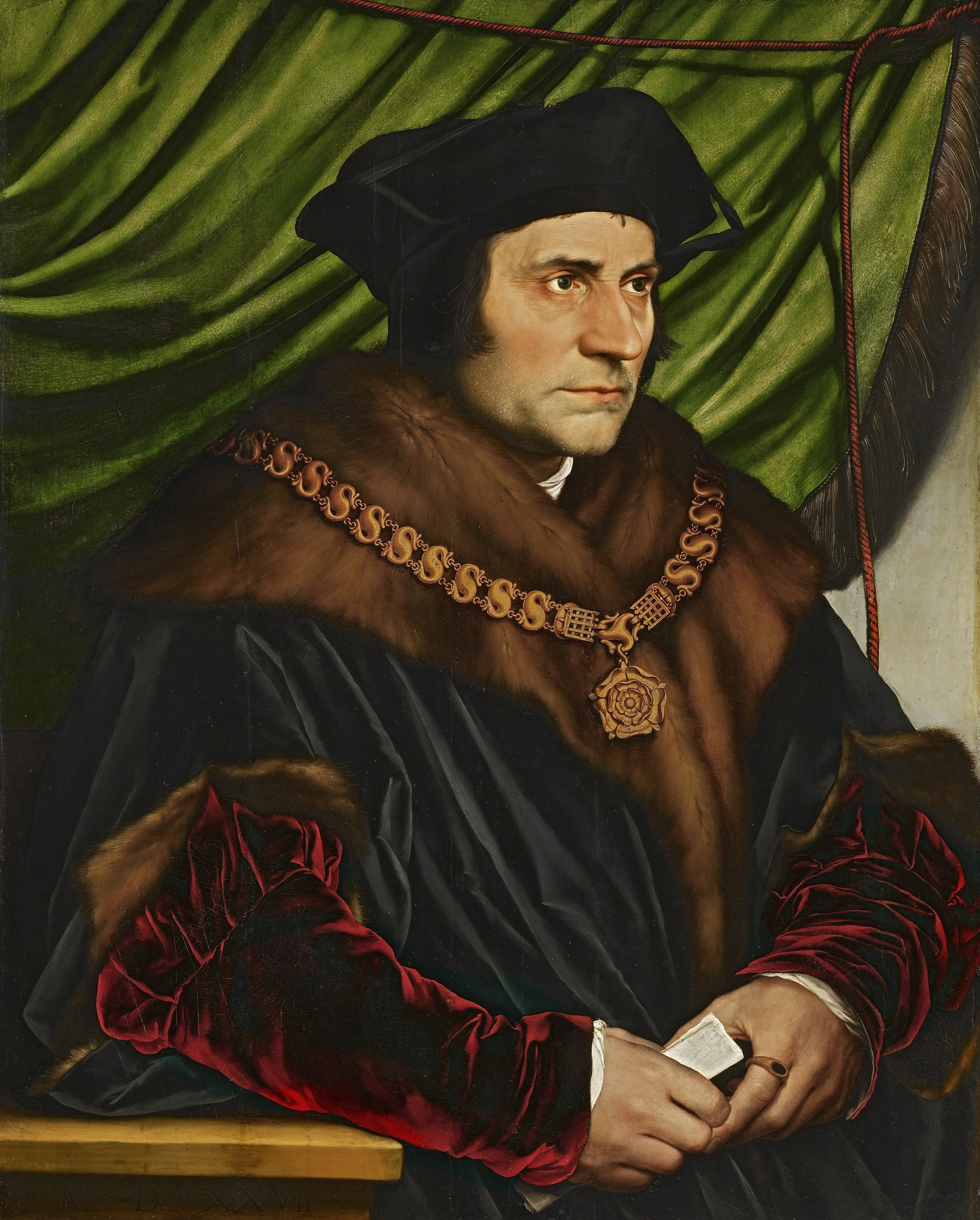
Thomas More

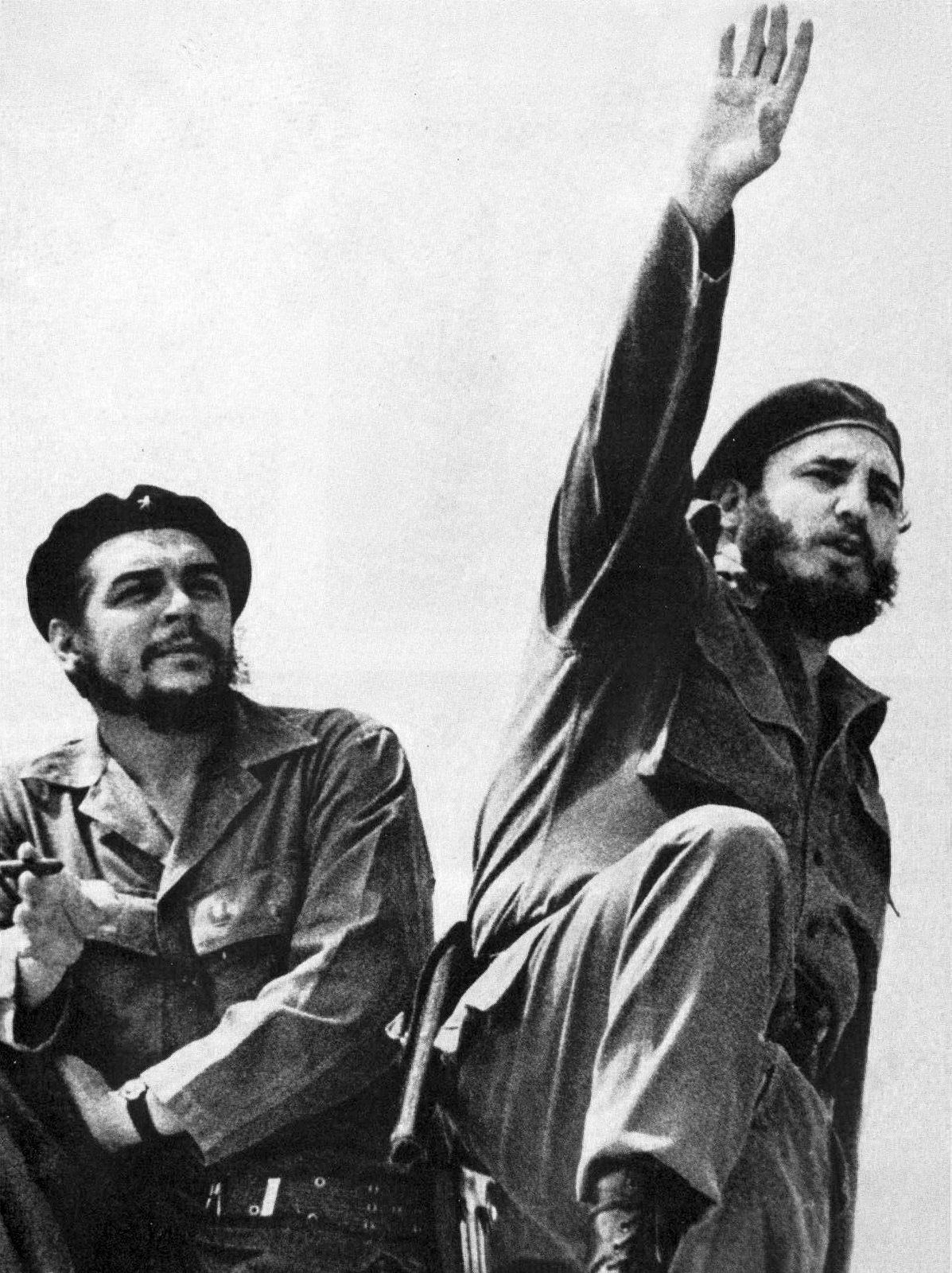
Che Guevara and Fidel Castro

Below is a list of post World War II scholarly books and journal articles written in or translated into English about communism. Items on this list should be considered a non-exhaustive list of reliable sources related to the theory and practice of communism in its different forms.

Works listed here are cited in the notes or bibliographies of scholarly sources. Each is published by an academic or major press, written by a recognized expert, or substantially reviewed in scholarly journals; borderline cases are omitted. A selection of primary sources are included. Many of the books below carry their own bibliographies; see the Further reading section for other bibliographies, and the External links section for historical sites, academic sites, and museums.

Citations follow APA style. (Note: Entries are in plain text APA 7 format without templates; templates are used only for reviews and notes.) Book have citations to academic journal or mainstream published reviews when available. For books only partly about the subject, relevant chapter or section titles are provided when useful and available. Translators of the original-language edition are included when possible. In cases where a title or name has appeared with more than one English spelling, the most recent published form is used and a footnote documents any earlier title under which the work appeared.

== General works about the theory and history of communism ==
- Brown, A. (2009). The Rise and Fall of Communism. London: The Bodley Head.
- Haslam, J. (2021). The Spectre of War: International Communism and the Origins of World War II. In Princeton Studies in International History and Politics. Princeton: Princeton University Press.
- Holmes, L. (2009). Communism: A Very Short Introduction. New York: Oxford University Press.

The Cambridge History of Communism

- Pons, S., & Smith, S. A. (Eds.). (2017). The Cambridge History of Communism. (Vol. 1). Cambridge, UK: Cambridge University Press. (Note: The notes at the end of each essay (chapter) includes substantial bibliographic entries.)
- Naimark, N., Pons, S., & Quinn-Judge, S. (Eds.). (2017). The Cambridge History of Communism: Volume 2, The Socialist Camp and World Power 1941–1960s. Cambridge, UK: Cambridge University Press. (Note: The notes at the end of each essay (chapter) includes substantial bibliographic entries.)
- Fürst, J., Pons, S., & Selden, M. (Eds.). (2017). The Cambridge History of Communism: Volume 3, Endgames? Late Communism in Global Perspective, 1968 to the Present. Cambridge, UK: Cambridge University Press. (Note: The notes at the end of each essay (chapter) includes substantial bibliographic entries.)

== Works primarily about theory ==
Books in this section are grouped by subject, not author perspective.

=== Background ===
- Lichtheim, G. (1980). A Short History of Socialism. London: Weidenfeld and Nicolson.

=== Marxism and variations ===
- Cohen, S. F. (1970). Bukharin, Lenin and the Theoretical Foundations of Bolshevism. Soviet Studies, 21(4), pp. 436–457.
- Furet, F. (1999). The Passing of an Illusion: The Idea of Communism in the Twentieth Century. Chicago: University of Chicago Press.
- Losurdo, D. (2004). Towards a Critique of the Category of Totalitarianism. Historical Materialism. 12(2), pp. 25–55.

==== Leninism and Marxist Leninism ====
- Biggart, J. (1981). "Anti-Leninist Bolshevism": The Forward Group of the RSDRP. Canadian Slavonic Papers, 23(2), pp. 134–153.
- Evans, A. (1987). Rereading Lenin's State and Revolution. Slavic Review, 46(1), pp. 1–19.
- Gerratana, V. (1977). Stalin, Lenin and 'Leninism'. New Left Review, (103).
- Harding, N. (1996). Leninism. London: Palgrave Macmillan.
- ———. (2010). Lenin's Political Thought (2 vols.). Chicago, IL: Haymarket.
- Lane, D. S. (1981). Leninism: A Sociological Interpretation. Cambridge, UK: Cambridge University Press.
- Liebman, M. (1975). Leninism Under Lenin. Chicago: Haymarket Books.
- Levine, N. (1985). Lenin's Utopianism. Studies in Soviet Thought. 30(2), pp. 95–107.
- Melograni, P. (1989). Lenin and the Myth of World Revolution: Ideology and Reasons of State, 1917-1920. Atlantic Highlands, NJ: Humanities Press International.
- Meyer, A. G. (1986). Leninism. Cambridge, MA: Harvard University Press.
- Ree, E. van. (2010). Lenin's Conception of Socialism in One Country, 1915–17. Revolutionary Russia, 23(2), pp. 159–181.
- Theen, R. (1972). The Idea of the Revolutionary State: Tkachev, Trotsky, and Lenin. The Russian Review, 31(4), pp. 383–397.
- Ryan, J. (2012). Lenin's Terror: The Ideological Origins of Early Soviet State Violence. London: Routledge.
- Sabine, G. (1961). The Ethics of Bolshevism. The Philosophical Review, 70(3), pp. 299–319.
- Uldricks, T. J. (1979). Diplomacy and Ideology: The Origins of Soviet Foreign Relations, 1917-1930. London, UK: Sage Publications.
- White, J. D. (2001). Lenin: The Practice and Theory of Revolution. New York: Red Globe Press.

==== Trotskyism ====
- Getty, J. (1986). Trotsky in Exile: The Founding of the Fourth International. Soviet Studies, 38(1), pp. 24–35.
- McNeal, R. (1961). Trotsky's Interpretation of Stalin. Canadian Slavonic Papers, 5, pp. 87–97.
- Theen, R. (1972). The Idea of the Revolutionary State: Tkachev, Trotsky, and Lenin. The Russian Review, 31(4), pp. 383–397.
- Rowney, D. K. (1977). Development of Trotsky's Theory of Revolution, 1898–1907. Studies in Comparative Communism, 10(1/2), pp. 18–33.

==== Stalinism ====
- Fitzpatrick, S. (2006). Stalinism: New Directions. London, UK: Routledge.
- Gaido, D. (2011). Marxist Analyses of Stalinism. Science & Society, 75(1), pp. 99–107.
- Mccauley, M. (2015). Stalin and Stalinism. New York, NY: Routledge.
- Medvedev, R. A. (1979). On Stalin and Stalinism. New York, NY: Oxford University Press.
- Reichman, H. (1988). Reconsidering "Stalinism". Theory and Society, 17(1), pp. 57–89.
- Schull, J. (1992). The Ideological Origins of “Stalinism” in Soviet Literature. Slavic Review, 51(3), pp. 468–484.

== Works about internations expressions of communism ==
- Getty, J. (1986). Trotsky in Exile: The Founding of the Fourth International. Soviet Studies, 38(1), pp. 24–35.
- Kirby, D. (1986). War, Peace and Revolution: International Socialism at the Crossroads, 1914-1918. New York, NY: St. Martin's Press.
- McDermott, K., Agnew, J. (1996). The Comintern: A History of International Communism from Lenin to Stalin. New York: St. Martin's Press.

== Works about national expressions of communism ==
=== Russia and the Soviet Union ===
- Borys, J. & Armstrong, J. A. (1980). The Sovietization of Ukraine, 1917-1923: The Communist Doctrine and Practice of National Self-Determination. Edmonton, AB: Canadian Institute of Ukrainian Studies.
- Brandenberger, D., & Dubrovsky, A. (1998). 'The People Need a Tsar': The Emergence of National Bolshevism as Stalinist Ideology, 1931-1941. Europe-Asia Studies, 50(5), pp. 873–892.
- Brovkin, V. N. (1983). The Mensheviks' Political Comeback: The Elections to the Provincial City Soviets in Spring 1918. The Russian Review, 42(1), pp. 1–50.
- ———. (1984). The Mensheviks Under Attack The Transformation of Soviet Politics, June-September 1918. Jahrbücher Für Geschichte Osteuropas, 32(3), Neue Folge, pp. 378–391.
- ———. (1987). The Mensheviks after October: Socialist Opposition and the Rise of the Bolshevik Dictatorship. Ithaca, NY: Cornell University Press.
- ———. (1994). Behind the Front Lines of the Civil War: Political Parties and Social Movements in Russia, 1918–1922. Princeton, NJ: Princeton University Press.
- Burbank, J. (1995). Lenin and the Law in Revolutionary Russia. Slavic Review, 54(1), pp. 23–44.
- Campeanu, P. (2016). Origins of Stalinism: From Leninist Revolution to Stalinist Society. London, UK: Routledge.
- Daniels, R. V. (1960). The Conscience Of The Revolution: Communist Opposition In Soviet Russia. Cambridge, MA: Harvard University Press.
- ———. (1991). The Left Opposition as an Alternative to Stalinism. Slavic Review, 50(2), pp. 277–285.
- Day, R. B. (1977). Trotsky and Preobrazhensky: The Troubled Unity of the Left Opposition. Studies in Comparative Communism, 10(1/2), pp. 69–86.
- Donald, M. (1993). Marxism and Revolution: Karl Kautsky and the Russian Marxists, 1900-1924. New Haven: Yale University Press. (Note: see Karl Kautsky.)
- Felshtinsky, Y. (1990). Lenin, Trotsky, Stalin and the Left Opposition in the USSR 1918-1928. Cahiers Du Monde Russe Et Soviétique, 31(4), pp. 569–578.
- Gregor, A. J. (2012). Chapter 4, Leninism: Revolution as Religion. In Totalitarianism and Political Religion: An Intellectual History. Palo Alto, CA: Stanford University Press.
- Kowalski, R. I. (1991). The Bolshevik Party in Conflict: The Left Communist Opposition of 1918. Basingstoke, UK: Macmillan.
- Laqueur, W. (1994). The Dream That Failed: Reflections on the Soviet Union. New York: Oxford University Press.
- Leggett, George. (1981). The Cheka: Lenin's Political Police. New York: Oxford University Press.
- Lindemann, A. S. (1974). The "Red Years": European Socialism versus Bolshevism, 1919-1921. Berkeley, CA: University of California Press.
- Pipes, R. (1950). The First Experiment in Soviet National Policy: The Bashkir Republic, 1917-1920. The Russian Review, 9(4), pp. 303–319. (Note: See Bashkir Autonomous Soviet Socialist Republic.)
- ———. (1997). The Formation of the Soviet Union: Communism and Nationalism, 1917-1923 (Revised Edition). Cambridge, MA: Harvard University Press.
- ———. (2011). Russia Under the Bolshevik Regime: 1919–1924. New York: Knopf.
- Radkey, O. H. (1950). Russia Goes to the Polls: The Election to the All-Russian Constituent Assembly, 1917. Cambridge, MA: Harvard University Press.
- ———. (1953). An Alternative to Bolshevism: The Program of Russian Social Revolutionism. The Journal of Modern History, 25(1), pp. 25–39.
- ———. (1964). The Sickle Under the Hammer: The Russian Socialist Revolutionaries in the Early Months of Soviet Rule. Berkeley, CA: University Presses of California.
- Rigby, T. H. (1979). Lenin's Government: Sovnarkom 1917–1922. Cambridge: Cambridge University Press.
- Rogger, H. (2016). Russia in the Age of Modernisation and Revolution 1881 - 1917. New York, NY: Routledge.
- Rosenberg, W. G. (1974). Liberals in the Russian Revolution: The Constitutional Democratic Party, 1917–1921. Princeton, NJ: Princeton University Press.
- ———. (1990). Bolshevik Visions: First Phase of the Cultural Revolution in Soviet Russia. Ann Arbor, MI: University of Michigan Press.
- Ryan, James. (2012). Lenin's Terror: The Ideological Origins of Early Soviet State Violence. London: Routledge.
- Schapiro, L. B. (1984). The Russian Revolutions of 1917: The Origins of Modern Communism. New York: Basic Books.
- ———. (1977). The Origin of the Communist Autocracy: Political Opposition in the Soviet State; First Phase 1917-1922 (2nd Edition). Cambridge, MA: Harvard University Press.
- ———. (1978). The Communist Party of the Soviet Union (2nd Edition). London, UK: Methuen Publishing.
- Slezkine, Yuri. (2017). The House of Government: A Saga of the Russian Revolution. Princeton: Princeton University Press.
- Smith, S. B. (2013). Captives of Revolution: The Socialist Revolutionaries and the Bolshevik Dictatorship, 1918–1923. Pittsburgh, PA: University of Pittsburgh Press.
- Suny, R. G. (Ed.). (2006). The Cambridge History of Russia: Volume 3, The Twentieth Century. Cambridge, UK: Cambridge University Press. (Note: Contains a 60 page scholarly select bibliography of works relating to the history of the Soviet Union.)
- Swain, G. (1991) Before The Fighting Started: A discussion on the theme of ‘The Third Way’. Revolutionary Russia, 4(2), pp. 210–234.
- Thomson, J. M. (1987). The Origin of the Communist Autocracy: Political Opposition in the Soviet State, First Phase 1917–1922. New York, NY: Palgrave Macmillan.
- Treadgold, D. W. (2017). Lenin and His Rivals: The Struggle for Russia's Future, 1898-1906. London, UK: Routledge.
- Van Ree, E. (1994). Stalin's Bolshevism: The First Decade. International Review of Social History, 39(3), pp. 361–381.
- Venturi, F. (1960). Roots of Revolution: A History of the Populist and Socialist Movements in Nineteenth Century Russia. London, UK: Weidenfeld & Nicolson.

=== Europe ===
- Harison, C. (2007). The Paris Commune of 1871, the Russian Revolution of 1905, and the Shifting of the Revolutionary Tradition. History and Memory, 19(2), pp. 5–42.

==== Soviet Eastern Europe ====
- Chmielewska, K., Mrozik, A., & Wołowiec, G. (Eds.). (2021). Reassessing Communism: Concepts, Culture, and Society in Poland 1944–1989. Central European University Press.
- Naimark, N., Gibianskii, L. (eds.). (1997). The Establishment of Communist Regimes in Eastern Europe, 1944–1949. Boulder, CO: Westview Press.

== Works about local expressions of communism ==
Works here are about communist communities which existed in non-communist states.

== Comparative studies ==
- Gellately, R. (2007). Lenin, Stalin, and Hitler: The Age of Social Catastrophe. New York, NY: Knopf.
- Geyer, M., & Fitzpatrick, S. (2009). Beyond Totalitarianism: Stalinism and Nazism Compared. Cambridge, UK: Cambridge University Press.
- Gregor, A. J. (2009). Marxism, Fascism, and Totalitarianism: Chapters in the Intellectual History of Radicalism. Palo Alto, CA: Stanford University Press.
- Kershaw, I., & Lewin, M. (1997). Stalinism and Nazism: Dictatorships in Comparison. Cambridge, UK: Cambridge University Press.
- Pauley, B. F. (2015). Hitler, Stalin, and Mussolini: Totalitarianism in the Twentieth Century. West Sussex, UK: Wiley-Blackwell.

=== Communism and totalitarianism ===
- Losurdo, D. (2004). Towards a Critique of the Category of Totalitarianism. Historical Materialism. 12(2), pp. 25–55.
- Pauley, B. F. (2015). Hitler, Stalin, and Mussolini: Totalitarianism in the Twentieth Century. West Sussex, UK: Wiley-Blackwell.

== Biography ==
Biographies of major figures in the history and theory of communism.

- Baron, S. H. (1963). Plekhanov: The Father of Russian Marxism. Stanford: Stanford University Press. (Note: See Georgi Plekhanov.)
- Deutscher, I. (2015). The Prophet: The Life of Leon Trotsky. New York, NY: Verso. (Note: Originally published in three volumes by Oxford University Press (1954, 1959, 1963).)
- Getzler, I. (1967). Martov: Political Biography: A Political Biography of a Russian Social Democrat. Cambridge, UK: Cambridge University Press.
- Kotkin, S. (2014). Stalin: Volume I: Paradoxes of Power, 1878–1928. New York, NY: Penguin Press.
- ———. (2017). Stalin. (Vol. 2). Waiting for Hitler, 1928–1941. New York, NY: Penguin Books.
- Mccauley, M. (2015). Stalin and Stalinism. New York, NY: Routledge.
- McLellan, D. (2006). Karl Marx: A Biography. Basingstoke: Palgrave Macmillan.
- Theen, R. (2004). Lenin: Genesis and Development of a Revolutionary. Princeton: Princeton University Press.
- Wood, A. (2005). Stalin and Stalinism. London, UK: Routledge.

== Other ==
- Hanebrink, P. (2018). A Specter Haunting Europe: The Myth of Judeo-Bolshevism. Cambridge, MA: Belknap Press.

== Select primary sources in English ==
- Gregor, R. (2019). Resolutions and Decisions of the Communist Party of the Soviet Union, Volume 2: The Early Soviet Period 1917-1929. Toronto, ON: University of Toronto Press.
- Hoffmann, D. L. (Ed.). (2002). Stalinism: The Essential Readings. Hoboken, NJ: Wiley-Blackwell.

== Academic journals ==
The list below contains academic journals frequently referenced in this bibliography or that will contain other articles related to the history and theory of communism.

- Canadian-American Slavic Studies (1967–Present): Brill Online.
- Central Asian Survey (1982–Present): Taylor Francis Online.
- Contemporary European History (1992–2014): JSTOR.
- East European Quarterly (1967–2008, 2015–Present): Central European University.
- Journal of Baltic Studies (1970–Present): Taylor Francis Online.
- Journal of Modern Russian History and Historiography (2008–Present): Brill Online.
- Journal of Ukrainian Studies (1976–2012): Canadian Institute of Ukrainian Studies.
- Kritika: Explorations in Russian and Eurasian History (2000–Present): Georgetown University, Project Muse.
- The Polish Review (1942–1945, 1956–2019): The Polish Institute of Arts and Sciences of America, JSTOR.
- Rethinking Marxism (2003–present) Official website.
- Revolutionary Russia (1988–Present): Taylor Francis Online.
- The Russian Review (1941–Present): Wiley Online, Wiley Online Library, JSTOR.
- Russian Studies in History (formerly Soviet Studies in History) (1962–1992, 1992–Present): Taylor Francis Online.
- Sibirica: Journal of Siberian Studies (2001–2019): Berghahn, Taylor Francis Online.
- Studies in Soviet Thought (1961–2016): JSTOR.
- The Slavic and East European Journal (1957–Present): American Association of Teachers of Slavic and East European Languages, JSTOR.
- Slavic Review (1961–Present): University of Illinois, JSTOR.
- Slavonic and East European Review (1922–1927, 1928–Present): UCL School of Slavonic And East European Studies, JSTOR.
- Soviet Studies (1949–1992): JSTOR.
- Studies in Comparative Communism (1968–1992): Science Direct Online.
- Politics, Religion & Ideology (formerly Totalitarian Movements and Political Religions) (2000–Present): Taylor Francis Online

== Bibliographies ==
This annotated list contains bibliographies of communism and works containing significant bibliographies on communism.

Books

- Suny, R. G. (Ed.). (2006). The Cambridge History of Russia: Volume 3, The Twentieth Century. Cambridge, UK: Cambridge University Press. (Note: Contains a 60 page scholarly select bibliography of works relating to the history of the Soviet Union.)
- Pons, S., & Smith, S. A. (Eds.). (2017). The Cambridge History of Communism. (Vol. 1). Cambridge, UK: Cambridge University Press. (Note: The notes at the end of each essay (chapter) includes substantial bibliographic entries.)
- Naimark, N., Pons, S., & Quinn-Judge, S. (Eds.). (2017). The Cambridge History of Communism: Volume 2, The Socialist Camp and World Power 1941–1960s. Cambridge, UK: Cambridge University Press.
- Fürst, J., Pons, S., & Selden, M. (Eds.). (2017). The Cambridge History of Communism: Volume 3, Endgames? Late Communism in Global Perspective, 1968 to the Present. Cambridge, UK: Cambridge University Press. (Note: The notes at the end of each essay (chapter) includes substantial bibliographic entries.)

Academic journals

- Filardo, P. M. (2017). United States Communist History Bibliography 2016, and a Selective Bibliography of Non-U.S. Communism and Communism-Related Theory. American Communist History, 16(3–4), 168–220.
- Haynes, J. E. (2004). "A Bibliography of Communism, Film, Radio and Television". Film History. 16(4): 396–423.

== See also ==
- Bibliography on American Communism
- Bibliography of the Russian Revolution and Civil War
- Bibliography of Stalinism and the Soviet Union
- Bibliography of the Post Stalinist Soviet Union
- List of communist parties
