= Subei =

Subei may refer to:

- Subei region (苏北) or Northern Jiangsu, the part of Jiangsu north of the Yangtze
  - Subei people, those who from North Jiangsu
- Subei Mongol Autonomous County (肃北), Jiuquan, Gansu, China
