= S. A. Smith =

British historian & academic (born 1952)

Stephen Anthony Smith, FBA, FRHistS (born 1952) is a British historian and academic. Since 2012, he has been professor of history at the University of Oxford and a senior research fellow at All Souls College, Oxford. Smith was elected a Fellow of the Royal Historical Society in 1995, and a Fellow of the British Academy, the United Kingdom's national academy, in 2014.

Born in 1952, Smith completed his undergraduate studies at Oriel College, Oxford (1970–73), graduating with a modern history degree. In 1974, he was then awarded a Master of Social Science degree in Soviet studies from the University of Birmingham, where he remained to carry out doctoral studies; his PhD was awarded in 1980 for his thesis "The Russian Revolution and the factories of Petrograd, February 1917 to June 1918".

While completing his PhD, Smith taught at the Moscow State University from 1976 to 1977, and then joined the faculty of the University of Essex as a lecturer in 1977. He was promoted to a senior lectureship in 1984 and was then appointed Professor of History in 1991. In 2008, he moved to the European University Institute in Florence to be Professor of Comparative History, and remained there until 2012, when he was appointed professor of history at the University of Oxford and a senior research fellow at All Souls College, Oxford. He was also editor of the journal Past & Present from 2009 to 2014.

== Research and bibliography ==
According to his college profile, Smith's "research interests are in the histories of modern Russia and China and in comparative Communism."

- Russia in Revolution: An Empire in Crisis, 1890 to 1928 (Oxford: Oxford University Press, 2017).
- The Oxford Handbook of the History of Communism (Oxford: Oxford University Press, 2014).
- Revolution and the People in Russia and China: A Comparative History (Cambridge: Cambridge University Press, 2008).
- (Co-authored with Alan Knight) The Religion of Fools? Superstition Past and Present, Past & Present supplement 3 (2008).
- The Russian Revolution: A Very Short Introduction (Oxford: Oxford University Press, 2002).
- Like Cattle and Horses: Nationalism and Labor in Shanghai, 1895–1927 (Durham NC: Duke University Press, 2002).
- A Road is Made: Communism in Shanghai, 1920–27 (Honolulu/Richmond, UK: Curzon Press/University of Hawaii Press, 2000).
- Red Petrograd: Revolution in the Factories, 1917–1918 (Cambridge: Cambridge University Press, 1983).
