= Bibliography of the Russian Revolution and Civil War =

This is a select bibliography of post-World War II English language books (including translations) and journal articles about the Revolutionary and Civil War era of Russian (Soviet) history. The sections "General surveys" and "Biographies" contain books; other sections contain both books and journal articles.

The period covered is 1904–1923, beginning approximately with the 1905 Russian Revolution and ending approximately with the death of Lenin. The works on the Revolution and Civil War in the Russian Empire extend to 1926.

Topics covered include the Russian Revolution (1905), the February and October Revolutions in 1917, and the Russian Civil War, as well as closely related events, and biographies of prominent individuals involved in the Revolution and Civil War. A limited number of English translations of significant primary sources are included along with references to larger archival collections. This bibliography does not include newspaper articles (except primary sources and references), fiction or photo collections created during or about the Revolution or Civil War.

For works on the Russo-Japanese War, see Bibliography of the Russo-Japanese War; for works on the Russian involvement in World War I, see Bibliography of Russia during World War I.

This bibliography is restricted to history. (Note: Memoirs and diaries with a clear historical importance as shown by academic citations and publishing are included in a section.)

Works listed here are cited in the notes or bibliographies of scholarly sources. Each is published by an academic or major press, written by a recognized expert, or substantially reviewed in scholarly journals; borderline cases are omitted. A selection of primary sources are included. Many of the books below carry their own bibliographies; see the Further reading section for other bibliographies, and the External links section for historical sites, academic sites, and museums.

Citations follow APA style. (Note: Entries are in plain text APA 7 format without templates; templates are used only for reviews and notes.) Book have citations to academic journal or mainstream published reviews when available. For books only partly about the subject, relevant chapter or section titles are provided when useful and available. Translators of the original-language edition are included when possible. In cases where a title or name has appeared with more than one English spelling, the most recent published form is used and a footnote documents any earlier title under which the work appeared.

== Overviews of Russian history ==
General works on Russian history which have significant context for Russian history in general or content about this bibliography's timeframe of history.

- Acton, E. (1995). Russia: The tsarist and Soviet legacy (2nd ed.). Longman.
- Ascher, A. (2017). Russia: A short history (3rd rev. ed.). Oneworld Publications.
- Auty, R., & Obolensky, D. D. (Eds.). (1976–1981). Companion to Russian studies (3 vols.). Cambridge University Press.
- Bartlett, R. P. (2005). A history of Russia (Macmillan Essential Histories). Palgrave Macmillan.
- Billington, J. H. (1966). The icon and the axe: An interpretive history of Russian culture. Alfred A. Knopf.
- Blackwell, W. L. (1994). The industrialization of Russia: A historical perspective (3rd ed.). Harlan Davidson.
- Blum, J. (1961). Lord and peasant in Russia from the ninth to the nineteenth century. Princeton University Press.
- Bogatyrev, S. (Ed.). (2004). Russia takes shape: Patterns of integration from the Middle Ages to the present. Finnish Academy of Science and Letters.
- Borrero, M. (2004). Russia: A reference guide from the Renaissance to the present. Facts on File.
- Boterbloem, K. (2018). A history of Russia and its empire: From Mikhail Romanov to Vladimir Putin (2nd ed.). Rowman & Littlefield.
- Boterbloem, K. (2020). Russia as empire: Past and present. Reaktion Books.
- Breyfogle, N., Schrader, A., & Sunderland, W. (Eds.). (2007). Peopling the Russian periphery: Borderland colonization in Eurasian history. Routledge.
- Bushkovitch, P. (2011). A concise history of Russia. Cambridge University Press.
- Chatterjee, C. (2022). Russia in world history: A transnational approach. Bloomsbury Academic.
- Cherniavsky, M. (Ed.). (1970). The structure of Russian history: Interpretive essays. Random House.
- Christian, D. (1998–2018). A history of Russia, Central Asia and Mongolia (2 vols.). Blackwell; Wiley-Blackwell.
- Clarkson, J. D. (1969). A history of Russia (2nd ed.). Random House.
- Connolly, R. (2020). The Russian economy: A very short introduction. Oxford University Press.
- Dmytryshyn, B. (Ed.). (1991). Medieval Russia: A source book, 850–1700 (3rd ed.). Holt, Rinehart and Winston.
- Dmytryshyn, B. (1977). A history of Russia. Prentice-Hall.
- Dukes, P. (1998). A history of Russia: Medieval, modern, contemporary, c. 882–1996 (3rd ed.). Duke University Press.
- Evtuhov, C., Goldfrank, D., Hughes, L., & Stites, R. (2004). A history of Russia: Peoples, legends, events, forces. Houghton Mifflin.
- Figes, O. (2022). The story of Russia. Metropolitan Books.
- Forsyth, J. (1992). A history of the peoples of Siberia: Russia's North Asian colony 1581–1990. Cambridge University Press.
- Freeze, G. L. (Ed.). (2009). Russia: A history (3rd ed.). Oxford University Press.
- Gleason, A. (Ed.). (2009). A companion to Russian history (Wiley-Blackwell Companions to World History). Wiley-Blackwell.
- Grousset, R. (1970). The empire of the steppes: A history of Central Asia (N. Walford, Trans. (Note: Original-language edition: Grousset, R. (1939). L'empire des steppes: Attila, Gengis-Khan, Tamerlan. Payot. Walford's translation was made from the revised 1952 French edition.)). Rutgers University Press.
- Hosking, G. (1997). Russia: People and empire, 1552–1917. Harvard University Press.
- Hosking, G. (2001). Russia and the Russians: A history. Harvard University Press.
- Kochan, L., & Abraham, R. (1983). The making of modern Russia (2nd ed.). Penguin Books.
- Lieven, D. (2000). Empire: The Russian empire and its rivals. John Murray.
- Lieven, D., Perrie, M., & Suny, R. (Eds.). (2006). The Cambridge history of Russia (3 vols.). Cambridge University Press. (Note: The Cambridge History of Russia: Volume 1, From early Rus' to 1689; Volume 2, Imperial Russia, 1689–1917; Volume 3, The twentieth century.)
- Longworth, P. (2005). Russia: The once and future empire from pre-history to Putin. St. Martin's Press.
- Mazour, A. G. (1962). Russia: Tsarist and communist. Van Nostrand.
- Moss, W. G. (1997–2005). A history of Russia (2 vols.; 2nd ed., 2003–2005). Anthem Press.
- Pares, B. (1953). A history of Russia (definitive ed.). Alfred A. Knopf.
- Pipes, R. (1974). Russia under the old regime. Charles Scribner's Sons.
- Poe, M. T. (2003). The Russian moment in world history. Princeton University Press.
- Riasanovsky, N. V., & Steinberg, M. D. (2025). A history of Russia (10th ed.). Oxford University Press.
- Shubin, D. H. (2005). A history of Russian Christianity (4 vols.). Algora Publishing.
- Sumner, B. H. (1943). A short history of Russia. Reynal & Hitchcock.
- Vernadsky, G. (1943–1969). A history of Russia (5 vols.). Yale University Press. (Note: Vernadsky's five volumes are as follows: Vol. 1: Ancient Russia (1943); Vol. 2: Kievan Russia (1948); Vol. 3: The Mongols and Russia (1953); Vol. 4: Russia at the dawn of the modern age (1959); Vol. 5: The tsardom of Moscow, 1547–1682 (2 parts, 1969).)
- Vernadsky, G. (1961). A history of Russia (6th rev. ed.). Yale University Press.
- Ward, C. J., & Thompson, J. M. (2021). Russia: A historical introduction from Kievan Rus' to the present (9th ed.). Routledge.
- Wren, M. C., & Stults, T. (2009). The course of Russian history (5th ed.). Waveland Press.

== General surveys of Soviet history ==
These works contain significant overviews of the Revolution and Civil War era.

- Figes, O. (2015). Revolutionary Russia, 1891-1991. New York: Metropolitan Books.
- Heller, M., Nekrich, A. M., & Carlos, P. B. (1986). Utopia in Power: The History of the Soviet Union from 1917 to the present. New York: Simon and Schuster.
- Hosking, G. (1987). The First Socialist Society: A History of the Soviet Union from Within (2nd Edition). Cambridge: Harvard University Press.
- Kort, M. G. (2019). The Soviet Colossus (8th Edition). London: Routledge.
- Kenez, P. (2017). A History of the Soviet Union from the Beginning to its Legacy. New York: Cambridge University Press.
- Lewin, M. (2016). The Soviet Century. (G. Elliot, Ed.). New York: Verso.
- Malia, M. (1995). Soviet Tragedy: A History of Socialism in Russia 1917-1991. New York: Free Press.
- McAuley, M. (1992). Soviet Politics 1917-1991. Oxford University Press.
- McCauley, M. (2007). The Rise and Fall of the Soviet Union (Longman History Of Russia). London: Routledge.
- Nove, A. (1993). An Economic History of the USSR 1917-1991 (3rd Edition). London: Arkana Publishing.
- Suny, R. G. (1997). The Soviet Experiment: Russia, The USSR, and the Successor States. New York: Oxford University Press.
- Suny, R. G. (Ed.). (2006). The Cambridge History of Russia: Volume 3, The Twentieth Century. Cambridge: Cambridge University Press. (Note: Contains a 60 page scholarly select bibliography of works relating to the history of the Soviet Union.)
- Suny, R. G. (2013). The Structure of Soviet History: Essays and Documents (2nd ed.). New York: Oxford University Press.

== Period surveys ==
- Beevor, A. (2022). Russia: Revolution and Civil War, 1917—1921. New York: Viking Press.
- Brenton, T. (2017). Was Revolution Inevitable?: Turning Points of the Russian Revolution. New York: Oxford University Press.
- Carr, E. H. (1950–53). A History of Soviet Russia: The Bolshevik Revolution, 1917–1923. In 3 volumes. London: Macmillan.
- Chamberlin, W. H. (1935). The Russian Revolution. In two volumes. New York: Macmillan.
- Daniels, R. V. (1972). The Russian Revolution. Englewood Cliffs: Prentice-Hall.
- Dowler, W. (2010). Russia in 1913. DeKalb: DeKalb: Northern Illinois University Press.
- Engelstein, L. (2017). Russia in Flames: War, Revolution, Civil War, 1914–1921. New York: Oxford University Press.
- Figes, O. (1997). A People's Tragedy: A History of the Russian Revolution. New York: Viking Press.
- Fitzpatrick, S. (2017). The Russian Revolution. (4th ed.). New York: Oxford University Press.
- Lee, S. J. (2003). Lenin and Revolutionary Russia. London: Routledge.
- Kowalski, R. I. (1997). The Russian Revolution, 1917–1921 London: Routledge.
- Lewin, M. (2005). Lenin's Last Struggle. Ann Arbor, MI: University of Michigan Press.
- Lieven, D. (2016). The End of Tsarist Russia: The March to World War I and Revolution. New York: Penguin Books.
- Lincoln, W. B. (1986). Passage Through Armageddon: The Russians in War and Revolution, 1914-1918. New York: Simon and Schuster.
- Malone, R. (2004). Analysing the Russian Revolution. Cambridge: Cambridge University Press.
- Marples, D. R. (2014). Lenin's Revolution: Russia, 1917–1921. London: Routledge.
- McMeekin, S. (2017). The Russian Revolution: A New History. New York: Basic Books.
- Miéville, C. (2017). October: The Story of the Russian Revolution. New York: Verso.
- Pipes, R. (1990). The Russian Revolution. New York: Knopf.
- Rabinowich, A. (1968). Prelude to Revolution: The Petrograd Bolsheviks and the July 1917. Bloomington, IN: Indiana University Press.
- ———. (1976). The Bolsheviks Come to Power: The Revolution of 1917 in Petrograd. New York: W.W. Norton & Co.
- ———. (2007). The Bolsheviks in Power: The First Year of Soviet Rule in Petrograd. Bloomington, IN: Indiana University Press.
- ———. (2026). The Bolsheviks Survive: Petrograd 1919. Pittsburgh, PA: University of Pittsburgh Press.
- Read, C. (1996). From Tsar to Soviets: The Russian People and Their Revolution. New York: Oxford University Press.
- ———. (2013). War and Revolution in Russia, 1914–22. London: Macmillan.
- Schapiro, L. B. (1984). The Russian Revolutions of 1917: The Origins of Modern Communism. New York: Basic Books.
- Service, R. W. (1991). The Russian Revolution 1900–1927. London: Macmillan. (Note: A very short (107pp.) survey of the Russian Revolution. Covers very little about the Civil War or the period from 1921 to 1927. Contains an excellent 14 select bibliography of English language works.)
- Smith, S. A. (2017). Russia in Revolution: An Empire in Crisis, 1890 to 1928. New York: Oxford University Press.
- Smele, J. (2016). The "Russian" Civil Wars, 1916-1926: Ten Years That Shook the World. New York: Oxford University Press. (Note: Contains an extensive 46 bibliography of English and non-English works on the "Russian" Civil Wars.)
- Ulam, A. B. (1965). The Bolsheviks: The Intellectual and Political History of the Triumph of Communism in Russia. New York: Macmillan.
- Wade, R. A. (1969).The Russian Search For Peace, February - October 1917. Palo Alto: Stanford University Press
- ———. (2000). The Russian Revolution, 1917. Cambridge: Cambridge University Press.
- Williams, B. (2021). Late Tsarist Russia, 1881–1913 (Routledge Studies in the History of Russian and Eastern Europe). New York: Routledge.
- Zygar, M. (2017). The Empire Must Die: Russia's Revolutionary Collapse, 1900-1917. New York: PublicAffairs.

== Social history ==
- Anweiler, O. (1975). The Soviets: The Russian Workers, Peasants, and Soldiers Councils, 1905-1921. New York: Pantheon Books.
- Argenbright, R. (1998). The Soviet Agitational Vehicle: State Power on the Social Frontier. Political Geography, 17(3), 253–272.
- Badcock, S. (2007). Politics and the People in Revolutionary Russia: A Provincial History. Cambridge: Cambridge University Press.
- Bettelheim, C., & Pearce, B. (1976). Class Struggles in the USSR: First Period 1917-1923. New York: Monthly Review Press.
- Borrero, M. (2003). Hungry Moscow: Scarcity and Urban Society in the Russian Civil War, 1917-1921. New York: Peter Lang.
- Brovkin, V. N. (1994). Behind the Front Lines of the Civil War: Political Parties and Social Movements in Russia, 1918–1922. Princeton: Princeton University Press.
- ———. (1997). The Bolsheviks in Russian Society: The Revolution and the Civil Wars. New Haven, CT: Yale University Press.
- Chary, F. (1975). The Russian Masses in the October Revolution 1917. European Labor and Working Class History, 7 (6–7).
- Engel, B. (1997). Not by Bread Alone: Subsistence Riots in Russia during World War I. The Journal of Modern History, 69(4), 696–721.
- Fitzpatrick, S. (1971). The Commissariat of Enlightenment: Soviet Organization of Education and the Arts Under Lunacharsky, October 1917-1921. Cambridge: Cambridge University Press.
- ———. (1992). The Cultural Front: Power and Culture in Revolutionary Russia. Ithaca: Cornell University Press. (Note: Covers the period from the October Revolution through the Stalinist 1930s.)
- ———. (1988). The Bolsheviks' Dilemma: Class, Culture, and Politics in the Early Soviet Years. Slavic Review, 47(4), 599–613.
- Fitzpatrick, S., Rabinowich, A., & Stites, R. (1995). Russia in the Era of NEP: Explorations in Soviet Society and Culture. Bloomington: Indiana University Press.
- Frame, M., Kolonit︠s︡kiĭ, B. I., Marks, S. G., & Stockdale, M. K. (2014). Russian Culture in War and Revolution, 1914–1922. Vol 1: Popular Culture, the Arts, and Institutions/Russian Culture in War and Revolution, 1914–1922. Vol. 2: Political Culture, Identities, Mentalities, and Memory. Bloomington: Slavica Publishers.
- Gleason, A. (1989). Bolshevik Culture: Experiment and Order in the Russian Revolution. Bloomington: Indiana University Press.
- Galmarini, M. (2016). The Right to Be Helped: Deviance, Entitlement, and the Soviet Moral Order (NIU Series in Slavic, East European, and Eurasian Studies). DeKalb: Northern Illinois University Press.
- Keep, J. L. H. (1976). The Russian Revolution. A Study in Mass Mobilization. New York: Norton.
- Koenker, D. (1985). Urbanization and Deurbanization in the Russian Revolution and Civil War. The Journal of Modern History, 57(3), 424–450.
- Koenker, D., Rosenberg, W. G., & Suny, R. G. (1989). Party, State, and Society in the Russian Civil War: Explorations in Social History. Bloomington: Indiana University Press.
- Lih, L. T. (1990). Bread and Authority in Russia, 1914–1921. Berkeley: University of California Press.
- Lorimer, F. (1979). The Population of the Soviet Union: History and Prospects. New York: AMS Press.
- Marot, J. E. (1994). Class Conflict, Political Competition and Social Transformation: Critical Perspectives on the Social History of the Russian Revolution. Revolutionary Russia, 7(2), 111–163.
- Mawdsley, E., & White, S. (2004). The Soviet Elite from Lenin to Gorbachev: The Central Committee and Its Members, 1917-1991. Oxford: Oxford University Press.
- Palat, M. V. K. (2001). Social Identities in Revolutionary Russia. New York: Palgrave Macmillan.
- Raleigh, D. (1999). Co-optation Amid Repression: The Revolutionary Communists in Saratov Province 1918-1920. Cahiers Du Monde Russe, 40(4), 625–656.
- Rosenberg, W. G. (1988). Identities, Power, and Social Interactions in Revolutionary Russia. Slavic Review, 47(1), 21–28.
- ———. (1990). Bolshevik Visions: First Phase of the Cultural Revolution in Soviet Russia. Ann Arbor, MI: University of Michigan Press.
- Sanborn, J. (2005). Unsettling the Empire: Violent Migrations and Social Disaster in Russia during World War I. The Journal of Modern History, 77(2), 290–324.
- Service, R. W. (1999). Society and Politics in the Russian Revolution. New York: Macmillan.
- Siegelbaum, L. H. (1994). Soviet State and Society Between Revolutions, 1918-1929. Cambridge: Cambridge University Press.
- Stites, R. (1992). Russian Popular Culture: Entertainment and Society Since 1900. Cambridge: Cambridge University Press.
- Smith, D. (1983). Former People: The Final Days of the Russian Aristocracy. New York: Picador Macmillan.
- Steinberg, M. D. (2018). Proletarian Imagination: Self, Modernity, and the Sacred in Russia, 1910-1925. Ithaca: Cornell University Press.
- Stites, R. (1988). Revolutionary Dreams: Utopian Vision and Experimental Life in the Russian Revolution. New York: Oxford University Press.
- Wheatcroft, S. (1983). Famine and Epidemic Crises in Russia, 1918-1922: The Case of Saratov. Annales De Démographie Historique, (1983), 329–352.
- Williams, C. (1993). The 1921 Russian Famine: Centre and Periphery Responses. Revolutionary Russia, 6(2), 277–314.

=== Workers ===
- Allen, B. (2005). Alexander Shliapnikov and the Origins of the Workers' Opposition, March 1919-April 1920. Jahrbücher Für Geschichte Osteuropas, 53(1), 1–24.
- Avrich, P. (1963). The Bolshevik Revolution and Workers' Control in Russian Industry. Slavic Review, 22(1), 47–63.
- Aves, J. (1996). Workers Against Lenin: Labour Protest and the Bolshevik Dictatorship. London: I.B. Tauris.
- Bater, J. H. (1976). St Petersburg: Industrialization and Change. London: E. Arnold.
- Berk, S. (1975). The "Class-Tragedy" of Izhevsk: Working-Class Opposition to Bolshevism in 1918. Russian History, 2(2), 176–190.
- Boll, M. M. (1979). The Petrograd Armed Workers Movement in the February Revolution (February–July, 1917): A Study in the Radicalization of the Petrograd Proletariat. Washington DC: University Press of America.
- Brinton, M. (1975). The Bolsheviks and Workers' Control, 1917-1921: The State and Counter-Revolution. Montreal, QC: Black Rose Books.
- Brovkin, V. (1990). Workers' Unrest and the Bolsheviks' Response in 1919. Slavic Review, 49(3), 350–373.
- Chase, W. J. (1987). Workers, society, and the Soviet State: Labor and Life in Moscow, 1918-1929. Urbana : University of Illinois Press.
- Haimson, L. (1964). The Problem of Social Stability in Urban Russia, 1905–1917. Slavic Review. Part 1: 23(4), 619–642. Part 2: 24(1), 1–22.
- Hamm, M. F. The Breakdown of Urban Modernization: A Prelude to the Revolution of 1917 in Hamm, M. F. (Ed.). (1976). The City in Russian History. Lexington, KY: Kentucky University Press. 182–210.
- Hatch, J. (1987). Working-Class Politics in Moscow during the Early NEP: Mensheviks and Workers' Organisations, 1921-1922. Soviet Studies, 39(4), 556–574.
- Holmes, L. E. (1990). For the Revolution Redeemed: The Workers Opposition in the Bolshevik Party 1919-1921. Pittsburgh, PA: University of Pittsburgh Center for Russian and East European Studies.
- Husband, W. (1985). Workers' Control and Centralization in the Russian Revolution: The Textile Industry of the Central Industrial Region, 1917-1920. Pittsburgh, PA: University of Pittsburgh Press.
- Jahn, H. (1990). The Housing Revolution in Petrograd 1917-1920. Jahrbücher Für Geschichte Osteuropas, 38(2), Neue Folge, 212–227.
- Kaiser, D. H. (Ed.). (1987). The Workers' Revolution in Russia, 1917. The View from Below. Cambridge: Cambridge University Press.
- Koenker, D. (1981). Moscow Workers and the 1917 Revolution. Princeton: Princeton University Press.
- ———. (1995). Men against Women on the Shop Floor in Early Soviet Russia: Gender and Class in the Socialist Workplace. The American Historical Review, 100(5), 1438–1464.
- Mandel, D. (2007). The Petrograd Workers and the Fall of the Old Regime: From the February Revolution to the July Days, 1917. Chicoutimi: Bibliothèque Paul-Émile Boulet de l'Université du Québec à Chicoutimi.
- Pirani, S. (2004). The Moscow Workers' Movement in 1921 and the Role of Non-Partyism. Europe-Asia Studies, 56(1), 143–160,
- Rappaport, H. (2017). Caught in the Revolution: Petrograd, Russia, 1917 - A World on the Edge. New York: St. Martin's Press.
- Rosenberg, W. (1985). Russian Labor and Bolshevik Power After October. Slavic Review, 44(2), 213–238.
- Rosenberg, W., & Koenker, D. (1987). The Limits of Formal Protest: Worker Activism and Social Polarization in Petrograd and Moscow, March to October, 1917. The American Historical Review, 92(2), 296–326.
- Rucker, R. (1979). Workers' Control of Production in the October Revolution and Civil War. Science & Society, 43(2), 158–185.
- Schwarz, S. M. (1967). Russian Revolution of 1905: Worker's Movement and Formation of Bolshevism and Menshevism. Chicago: University of Chicago Press.
- Shkliarevsky, G. (1993). Labor in the Russian Revolution: Factory Committees and Trade Unions: 1917-1918. New York: St. Martin's Press.
- Siegelbaum, L. H. (1983). The Politics of Industrial Mobilization in Russia, 1914-17: A Study of the War-Industries Committees. London: Macmillan.
- Smith, S. A. (1983/2010). Red Petrograd: Revolution in the Factories, 1917-1918 (Cambridge Russian, Soviet and Post-Soviet Studies). Cambridge: Cambridge University Press.
- ———. (1984). Moscow Workers and the Revolutions of 1905 and 1917. Soviet Studies, 36(2), 282–289.
- Tsuji, Y. (1989). The Debate on the Trade Unions, 1920–21. Revolutionary Russia, 2(1), 31–100.
- Wade, R. A. (1984). Red Guards and Workers' Militias in the Russian Revolution. Palo Alto: Stanford University Press.
- Ward, C. (1990). Russia's cotton workers and the new economic policy: Shop-Floor Culture and State Policy, 1921-1929. Cambridge University Press.

=== Soldiers and sailors ===
- Avrich, P. (1970). Kronstadt, 1921. Princeton: Princeton University Press.
- Bascomb, N. (2007). Red Mutiny: Eleven Fateful Days on the Battleship Potemkin. Boston: Houghton Mifflin Harcourt.
- Ferro, M. (1971). The Russian Soldier in 1917: Undisciplined, Patriotic, and Revolutionary. Slavic Review, 30(3), 483–512.
- Getzler, I. (2009). Kronstadt 1917-1921: The Fate of a Soviet Democracy (Cambridge Russian, Soviet and Post-Soviet Studies). Cambridge: Cambridge University Press.
- Jones, D. (1976). The Officers and the October Revolution. Soviet Studies, 28(2), 207–223.
- Longley, D. A. (1973). Officers and Men. A Study of the Development of Political Attitudes among the Sailors of the Baltic Fleet in 1917. Soviet Studies, 25(1), 28–50.
- Mawdsley, E. (1978). The Russian Revolution and the Baltic Fleet: War and Politics, February 1917-April 1918. London: Macmillan.
- Nikolaieff, A. (1946). The February Revolution and the Russian Army. The Russian Review, 6(1), 17–25.
- Sanborn, J. A. (2011). Drafting the Russian Nation: Military Conscription, Total War, and Mass Politics, 1905-1925. Dekalb: Northern Illinois University Press.
- Saul, N. (1978). Sailors in Revolt. The Russian Baltic Fleet in 1917. Lawrence, KS: Regents Press of Kansas.
- Von, H. M. (1993). Soldiers in the Proletarian Dictatorship: The Red Army and the Soviet Socialist State, 1917-1930. Ithaca: Cornell University Press.
- Wildman, A. (1970). The February Revolution in the Russian Army. Soviet Studies, 22(1), 3–23.

=== Peasants ===
- Atkinson, D. (1983). The End of the Russian Land Commune, 1905-1930. Palo Alto: Stanford University Press.
- Badcock, S. (2001). We're for the Muzhiks' Party!' Peasant Support for the Socialist Revolutionary Party During 1917. Europe-Asia Studies, 53(1), 133–149.
- Baker, M. (1999). Beyond the National: Peasants, Power, and Revolution in Ukraine. Journal of Ukrainian Studies, 24(1), 39–67.
- Baker, M. R. (2016). Peasants, Power, and Place: Revolution in the Villages of Kharkiv Province, 1914–1921 (Harvard Series In Ukrainian Studies). Cambridge: Harvard Ukrainian Research Institute.
- Bartlett, R. P. (1990). Land Commune and Peasant Community in Russia: Communal Forms in Imperial and Early Soviet Society. New York: St. Martin's Press.
- Bernstein, H. (2018). The 'peasant problem' in the Russian revolution(s), 1905–1929. The Journal of Peasant Studies 45(5/6) 1127–1150.
- Channon, J. (1988). The Bolsheviks and the Peasantry: The Land Question during the First Eight Months of Soviet Rule. The Slavonic and East European Review, 66(4), 593–624.
- Figes, O. (1989). Peasant Russia, Civil War: The Volga Countryside in Revolution (1917–1921). New York: Oxford University Press.
- Danilov, V. P. (1988). Rural Russia Under the New Regime. Bloomington: Indiana University Press.
- Fleishchauer, I. (1979). The Agrarian Program of the Russian Constitutional Democrats. Cahiers du Monde Russe et Soviétique, 20(2), 173–201.
- Gill, G. J. (1979). Peasants and Government in the Russian Revolution. Landham: Rowman & Littlefield.
- Graziosi, A. (1996). The Great Soviet Peasant War: Bolsheviks and Peasants, 1917-1933. Cambridge: Harvard University Press.
- Heinzen, J. (1997). "Alien" Personnel in the Soviet State: The People's Commissariat of Agriculture under Proletarian Dictatorship, 1918-1929. Slavic Review, 56(1), 73–100.
- Lih, L. (1986). Bolshevik Razverstka and War Communism. Slavic Review, 45(4), 673–688. (Note: See Prodrazvyorstka.)
- ———. (1990). The Bolshevik Sowing Committees of 1920: Apotheosis of War Communism?. The Carl Beck Papers in Russian and East European Studies.
- Miller, B. R. (2013). Rural unrest during the first Russian Revolution: Kursk Province, 1905-1906. Budapest: Central European University Press.
- Pallot, J. (1999). Land Reform in Russia, 1906-1917: Peasant Responses to Stolypin's Project of Rural Transformation. New York: Oxford University Press.
- Radkey, O. H. (1958). The Agrarian Foes of Bolshevism: Promise and Default of the Russian Socialist Revolutionaries February to October 1917. New York: Columbia University Press.
- Raleigh, D. (1986). Revolution on the Volga. 1917 in Saratov. Ithaca: NCROL.
- Retish, A. B. (2011). Russia's Peasants in Revolution and Civil War: Citizenship, Identity, and the Creation of the Soviet State, 1914-1922. Cambridge: Cambridge University Press.
- Seregny, S. J. (1989). Russian Teachers and Peasant Revolution: The Politics of Education in 1905. Bloomington: Indiana University Press.
- Seregny, S. (2000). Zemstvos, Peasants, and Citizenship: The Russian Adult Education Movement and World War I. Slavic Review, 59(2), 290–315.
- Shanin, T. (1972). The Awkward Class: Political Sociology of Peasantry in a Developing Society: Russia 1910-1925. Oxford: Clarendon Press.

=== Women and families ===
- Ball, A. M. (1996). And Now My Soul Is Hardened: Abandoned Children in Soviet Russia, 1918–1930. Berkeley: University of California Press.
- Bridger, S. (2012). Women in the Soviet Countryside: Women's Roles in Rural Development in the Soviet Union (Cambridge Russian, Soviet and Post-Soviet Studies). Cambridge: Cambridge University Press.
- Clements, B. E. (1982). Working-Class and Peasant Women in the Russian Revolution, 1917-1923. Signs, 8(2), 215–235.
- ———. (1992). The Utopianism of the Zhenotdel. Slavic Review, 51(3), 485–496.
- ———. (2000). Bolshevik Women. Cambridge: Cambridge University Press.
- Cox, J. (2019). The Women's Revolution: Russia 1905–1917. Chicago: Haymarket Books.
- Donald, M. (1982). Bolshevik Activity Amongst The Working Women Of Petrograd In 1917. International Review of Social History, 27(2), 129–160.
- Emery, J. (2017). Alternative Kinships: Economy and Family in Russian Modernism. DeKalb: Northern Illinois University Press.
- Engel, B. (1987). Women in Russia and the Soviet Union. Signs, 12(4), 781–796.
- Engel, B. A. (2021). Marriage, Household, and Home in Modern Russia from Peter the Great to Vladimir Putin (The Bloomsbury History of Modern Russia Series). London and New York: Bloomsbury Academic.
- Fitzpatrick, S., & Slezkine, Y. (2018). In the Shadow of Revolution: Life Stories of Russian Women from 1917 to the Second World War. Princeton: Princeton University Press.
- Friedman, R. (2020). Modernity, Domesticity and Temporality in Russia: Time at Home. London: Bloomsbury.
- Galili, Z. (1990). Women and the Russian Revolution. Dialectical Anthropology, 15(2/3), 119–127.
- Goldman, W. (2010). Women, the State and Revolution: Soviet Family Policy and Social Life, 1917-1936 (Cambridge Russian, Soviet and Post-Soviet Studies). Cambridge: Cambridge University Press.
- Harris, S. E. E. (2005). In Search of "Ordinary" Russia: Everyday Life in the NEP, the Thaw, and the Communal Apartment. Kritika: Explorations in Russian and Eurasian History. 6(3), 583–614.
- Hayden, C. (1976). The Zhenotdel and the Bolshevik Party. Russian History, 3(2), 150–173.
- Ilic, M. (Ed.). (2017). The Palgrave Handbook of Women and Gender in Twentieth-Century Russia and the Soviet Union. Palgrave Macmillan.
- Jahn, H. (1990). The Housing Revolution in Petrograd 1917-1920. Jahrbücher Für Geschichte Osteuropas, 38(2), 212–227.
- Lapidus, G. W. (1979). Women in Soviet Society: Equality, Development and Social Change. Berkeley: University of California Press.
- Massell, G. J. (1974). The Surrogate Proletariat: Moslem Women and Revolutionary Strategies in Soviet Central Asia, 1919-1929. Princeton: Princeton University Press.
- Ruthchild, R. G. (2010). Equality and Revolution: Women's Rights in the Russian Empire, 1905-1917. Pittsburgh, PA: University of Pittsburgh Press.
- Ruthchild, R. G. (2017). Women and Gender in 1917. Slavic Review, 76(3), 694–702.
- Stites, R. (1976). Zhenotdel: Bolshevism and Russian Women, 1917-1930. Russian History, 3(2), 174–193.
- Stites, R. (1978). The Women's Liberation Movement in Russia: Feminism, Nihilism, and Bolshevism, 1860-1930. Princeton: Princeton University Press.
- Turton, K. (2010). The Revolutionary, His Wife, the Party, and the Sympathizer: The Role of Family Members and Party Supporters in the Release of Revolutionary Prisoners. The Russian Review, 69(1), 73–92.
- Waters, E. (1992). The Modernisation of Russian Motherhood, 1917–1937. Soviet Studies, 44:1, 123–135.
- Waters, E. (1995). The Bolsheviks and the Family. Contemporary European History, 4(3), 275–291.
- Wood, E. (1997). The Baba and the Comrade Gender and Politics in Revolutionary Russia. Bloomington: Indiana University Press.

=== Religion ===
- Abramson, H. (1999). A Prayer for the Government: Ukrainians and Jews in Revolutionary Times, 1917–1920. Cambridge: Ukrainian Research Institute of Harvard University.
- Adams, A. S., & Shevzov, V. (Eds.). (2018). Framing Mary: The Mother of God in Modern, Revolutionary, and Post-Soviet Russian Culture. DeKalb: Northern Illinois University Press.
- Basil, J. (1979). Revolutionary Leadership and the Russian Orthodox Church in 1917. Church History, 48(2), 189–203.
- Bryant, F. R. (2012). Shot in the Back: On the Origins of the Anti-Jewish Pogroms of 1918–1921 In Avrutin, E. M. & Murav, H. (Eds.), Jews in the East European Borderlands. Boston: Academic Studies Press. 187–190.
- Budnitskii, Oleg. (2008). The Jews and Revolution: Russian Perspectives, 1881–1918. East European Jewish Affairs, 38(3), 321–334.
- ———. (2012). Russian Jews Between the Reds and the Whites, 1917-1920. Philadelphia, PA: University of Pennsylvania Press.
- Curtiss, J. S. (1963). The Russian Church and the Soviet State, 1917-1950. Boston: Little, Brown.
- Figes, O. (1998). Down With The Jew Kerensky! Judeophobia, Xenophobia and Anti-bourgeois Attitudes in the Russian Revolution. Jewish Quarterly, 45(2), 5–11.
- Gribble, R. (2009). Cooperation and Conflict Between Church and State: The Russian Famine of 1921-1923. Journal of Church and State, 51(4), 634–662.
- Husband, W. B. (1998). Soviet Atheism and Russian Orthodox Strategies of Resistance, 1917-1932. The Journal of Modern History, 70(1), 74–107.
- Husband, W. B. (2003). Godless Communists: Atheism and Society in Soviet Russia: 1917-1932. DeKalb: Northern Illinois University Press.
- Kenworthy, S. M. (2018). Rethinking the Russian Orthodox Church and the Bolshevik Revolution. Revolutionary Russia, 31(1), 1–23.
- Kerov, V. (2019). The Old Believers in 1917. Russian Studies in History, 58(1), 54–77.
- Lohr, E. (2001). The Russian Army and the Jews: Mass Deportation, Hostages, and Violence during World War I. The Russian Review, 60(3), 404–419.
- Luukkanen, A. (1994). The Party of Unbelief: The Religious Policy of the Bolshevik Party, 1917-1929. Helsinki: SHS.
- McGeever, B. (2017). Revolution and antisemitism: the Bolsheviks in 1917. Patterns of Prejudice, 51 (3–4), 235–252.
- ———. (2019). Antisemitism and the Russian Revolution. Cambridge: Cambridge University Press.
- Perabo, B. C. (2017). Russian Orthodoxy and the Russo-Japanese War. London: Bloomsbury Academic.
- Pinkus, B. (2009). The Jews of the Soviet Union: The History of a National Minority (Cambridge Russian, Soviet and Post-Soviet Studies). Cambridge: Cambridge University Press.
- Pospielovsky, D. (1984). The Russian Church under the Soviet Regime, 1917-1982. Crestwood: St. Vladimir's Seminary Press.
- Riga, L. (2006). Ethnonationalism, Assimilation, and the Social Worlds of the Jewish Bolsheviks in Fin de Siècle Tsarist Russia. Comparative Studies in Society and History, 48(4), 762–797.
- Roccucci, A. (2019). A Contradictory and Multifaceted relationship: Russian Orthodoxy and 1917. Harvard Ukrainian Studies, 36(1/2), 87–104.
- Rosenthal, B. G. (Ed.). (1997). The Occult in Russian and Soviet Culture. New York: Cornell University Press.
- Roslof, E. E. (2003). Red Priests: Renovationism, Russian Orthodoxy and Revolution, 1905-1946. Bloomington: Indiana University Press.

=== Other ===
- Barron, Stephanie; Tuchman, Maurice, eds. (1980). The Avant-Garde in Russia, 1910-1930: New Perspectives. Cambridge, MA: MIT Press. ISBN 9780262200400.
- Fedorova, M. (2013). Yankees in Petrograd, Bolsheviks in New York: America and Americans in Russian Literary Perception (NIU Series in Slavic, East European, and Eurasian Studies). DeKalb: Northern Illinois University Press.
- Frank, W. D. (2013). Everyone to Skis!: Skiing in Russia and the Rise of Soviet Biathlon (NIU Series in Slavic, East European, and Eurasian Studies). DeKalb: Northern Illinois University Press.
- Galai, S. (2009). The Liberation Movement in Russia 1900-1905 (Cambridge Russian, Soviet and Post-Soviet Studies). Cambridge: Cambridge University Press.
- Smith, M. G. (2017). An Empire of Substitutions: The Language Factor in the Russian Revolution. Harvard Ukrainian Studies, 35(1/4), 125–144.
- Widdis, E. (2017). Socialist Senses: Film, Feeling, and the Soviet Subject 1917–1940'. Bloomington: Indiana University Press.

== Economy ==
- Bailes, K. E. (1977). Alexei Gastev and the Soviet Controversy over Taylorism, 1918-24. Soviet Studies, 29(3), 373–394.
- Ball, A. M. (1990). Russia's Last Capitalists: The Nepmen, 1921-1929. Berkeley: University of California Press.
- Berkhin, I. B. (1994). So Just What Is "War Communism"?. Russian Studies in History, 33(1), 8–26.
- Buldakov, V. P., & Kabanov, V. V. (1994). War Communism: Ideology and Social Development. Russian Studies in History, 33(1), 27–51.
- Coopersmith, J. (2016). The Electrification of Russia, 1880-1926. Ithaca: Cornell University Press.
- Davies, R. W. (1991). From Tsarism to the New Economic Policy: Continuity and Change in the Economy of the USSR. Ithaca: Cornell University Press.
- ———. (2008). The Economic Transformation of the Soviet Union: 1913-1945. Cambridge: Cambridge University Press.
- Fitzpatrick, S., Rabinowich, A., & Stites, R. (1995). Russia in the Era of NEP: Explorations in Soviet Society and Culture. Bloomington: Indiana University Press.
- Gatrell, P. and Lewis, R. (1992). Russian and Soviet Economic History. The Economic History Review, 45(4), pp. 743–754.
- Gupta, D. (1979). Classes and Class Struggles in Russia under NEP: Part One. Social Scientist, 8(1), 3–19. Part Two. Social Scientist, 8(2), 30–50.
- Heywood, A. (2009). Modernising Lenin's Russia: Economic Reconstruction, Foreign Trade and the Railways (Cambridge Russian, Soviet and Post-Soviet Studies). Cambridge: Cambridge University Press.
- Himmer, R. (1994). The Transition from War Communism to the New Economic Policy: An Analysis of Stalin's Views. The Russian Review, 53(4), 515–529.
- Lih, L. (1986). Bolshevik Razverstka and War Communism. Slavic Review, 45(4), 673–688.
- ———. (2000). Bukharin's "Illusion": War Communism and the Meaning of NEP. Russian History, 27(4), 417–459.
- Malik, H. (2018). Bankers & Bolsheviks: International Finance and the Russian Revolution. Princeton: Princeton University Press.
- Malle, S. (1985). The Economic Organization of War Communism, 1918–1921. Cambridge: Cambridge University Press.
- Medeubayev, E. (2016). Political, Interparty and Moral Crisis of the "War Communism" Policy in Kazakhstan 1920-1922. Oriente Moderno, 96(1), 132–155.
- Oppenheim, S. (1973). The Supreme Economic Council 1917-21. Soviet Studies, 25(1), 3–27.
- Patenaude, B. M. (1995). Peasants into Russians: The Utopian Essence of War Communism. The Russian Review, 54(4), 552–570.
- Roberts, P. (1970). "War Communism": A Re-examination. Slavic Review, 29(2), 238–261.
- Roosa, R. (1972). Russian Industrialists and 'State Socialism', 1906-17. Soviet Studies, 23(3), 395–417.
- Smith, S. A. (2017). Chapter 5: War Communism. In Russia in Revolution: An Empire in Crisis, 1890 to 1928. New York: Oxford University Press.
- Suvorova, L. N. (1994). Behind the Facade of "War Communism": Political Power and the Market Economy. Russian Studies in History, 33(1), 72–88.
- Szamuely, L. (1971). Major Features of the Economy and Ideology of War Communism. Acta Oeconomica, 7(2), 143–160.
- Traub, R. (1978). Lenin and Taylor: The Fate of "Scientific Management" in the (Early) Soviet Union. Telos, 37(1), 82–92.
- Veselov, S. V. (1994). The Cooperative Movement and Soviet Rule: The Period of "War Communism". Russian Studies in History, 33(1), 52–71.

== The Revolution of 1905 ==
- Ascher, A. (1988, 1994). The Revolution of 1905: Russia in Disarray (Vol. 1) and Authority Restored (Vol. 2). Palo Alto: Stanford University Press.
- ———. (2004). ˜The Revolution of 1905: A Short History. Palo Alto: Stanford University Press.
- Bushnell, J. (1985). The Revolution of 1905-06 in the Army: The Incidence and Impact of Mutiny. Russian History, 12(1), 71–94.
- Edelman, R. (1985). Rural Proletarians and Peasant Disturbances: The Right Bank Ukraine in the Revolution of 1905. The Journal of Modern History, 57(2), 248–277.
- Fischer, . W. F., & Freeze, G. L. (2013). The Russian Revolution of 1905 in Transcultural Perspective: Identities, Peripheries, and the Flow of Ideas. Bloomington: Slavica.
- Galai, S. (1976). The Role of the Union of Unions in the Revolution of 1905. Jahrbücher Für Geschichte Osteuropas, 24(4), 512–525.
- Harcave, S. (1965). First Blood: The Russian Revolution of 1905. London: Bodley Head.
- Harison, C. (2007). The Paris Commune of 1871, the Russian Revolution of 1905, and the Shifting of the Revolutionary Tradition. History and Memory, 19(2), 5–42.
- Kaun, A. (1930). Maxim Gorky in the Revolution of 1905. The Slavonic and East European Review, 9(25), 133–148.
- Perrie, M. (2011). The Agrarian Policy of the Russian Socialist-Revolutionary Party: From its Origins through the Revolution of 1905-1907 (Cambridge Russian, Soviet and Post-Soviet Studies). Cambridge: Cambridge University Press.
- Preobrazhenskii, N. (2006). Little-known Aspects of the Russian Revolution of 1905. Critique, 34(3), 293–314.
- Raun, T. (1984). The Revolution of 1905 in the Baltic Provinces and Finland. Slavic Review, 43(3), 453–467.
- Rawson, D. C. (1992). Rightist Politics in the Revolution of 1905: The Case of Tula Province. Slavic Review, 51(1), 99–116.
- ———. (1995). Russian Rightists and the Revolution of 1905. Cambridge: Cambridge University Press.
- Schwarz, S. M. (1967). Russian Revolution of 1905: Worker's Movement and Formation of Bolshevism and Menshevism. Chicago: University of Chicago Press.
- Seregny, S. (1988). A Different Type of Peasant Movement: The Peasant Unions in the Russian Revolution of 1905. Slavic Review, 47(1), 51–67.
- Schurer, H. (1961). The Russian Revolution of 1905 and the Origins of German Communism. The Slavonic and East European Review, 39(93), 459–471.
- Siegel, J. (2016). The Russian Revolution of 1905 in the Eyes of Russia's Financiers. Revolutionary Russia, 29(1), 24–42.
- Strauss, H. (1973). Revolutionary Types: Russia in 1905. The Journal of Conflict Resolution. 17(2), 297–316.
- Verner, A. M. (1990). The Crisis of Russian Autocracy: Nicholas II and the 1905 Revolution. Princeton: Princeton University Press.
- Weinberg, R. (1993). The Revolution of 1905 in Odessa: Blood on the Steps. Bloomington: Indiana University Press.
- Yedlin, T. (1975). Maxim Gorky: His Early Revolutionary Activity and His Involvement in the Revolution of 1905. Canadian Slavonic Papers, 17(1), 76–105.

== February and October Revolutions ==
=== February ===
- Anin, D. (1967). The February Revolution: Was the Collapse Inevitable?. Soviet Studies, 18(4), 435–457.
- Ashworth, T. (1992). Soldiers Not Peasants: The Moral Basis of the February Revolution of 1917. Sociology, 26(3), 455–470.
- Boll, M. M. (1979). The Petrograd Armed Workers Movement in the February Revolution (February–July, 1917): A Study in the Radicalization of the Petrograd Proletariat. Washington DC: University Press of America.
- Bradley, J. (2017). The February Revolution. Russian Studies in History, 56(1), 1–5.
- Burdzhalov, E. N. (1987). Russia's Second Revolution. The February 1917 Uprising in Petrograd. Bloomington: Indiana University Press.
- Daly, J. (2009). Machine Guns, Hysteria, and the February Revolution. Russian History, 36(1), 141–155.
- Hasegawa, T. (1972). The Problem of Power in the February Revolution of 1917 in Russia. Canadian Slavonic Papers, 14(4), 611–633.
- ———. (1973). The Formation of the Militia in the February Revolution: An Aspect of the Origins of Dual Power. Slavic Review, 32(2), 303–322.
- ———. (1977). The Bolsheviks and the Formation of the Petrograd Soviet in the February Revolution. Soviet Studies, 29(1), 86–107.
- ———. (2017). The February Revolution, Petrograd, 1917: The End of the Tsarist Regime and the Birth of Dual Power. Boston: Brill Publishers.
- Katkov, G. (1979). Russia, 1917: The February Revolution. Westport, CT: Greenwood Press.
- Lyandres, S. (2013). The Fall of Tsarism: Untold Stories of the February 1917 Revolution. New York: Oxford University Press.
- Lyandres, S., & Nikolaev, A. B. (2017). Contemporary Russian Scholarship on the February Revolution in Petrograd: Some Centenary Observations. Revolutionary Russia, 30(2), 158–181.
- Kolonitskii, B. (1998). "Democracy" in the Political Consciousness of the February Revolution. Slavic Review, 57(1), 95–106.
- Mandel, D. (2007). The Petrograd Workers and the Fall of the Old Regime: From the February Revolution to the July Days, 1917. Chicoutimi: Bibliothèque Paul-Émile Boulet de l'Université du Québec à Chicoutimi.
- Melancon, M. (1988). Who Wrote What and When?: Proclamations of the February Revolution in Petrograd, 23 February - 1 March 1917. Soviet Studies, 40(3), 479–500.
- ———. (2000). Rethinking Russia's February Revolution: Anonymous Spontaneity or Socialist Agency?. The Carl Beck Papers in Russian and East European Studies, (1408).
- Mosse, W. (1967). The February Regime: Prerequisites of Success. Soviet Studies, 19(1), 100–108.
- Nikolaieff, A. (1946). The February Revolution and the Russian Army. The Russian Review, 6(1), 17–25.
- Norton, B. (1983). Russian Political Masonry and the February Revolution of 1917. International Review of Social History, 28(2), 240–258.
- Rendle, M. (2005). The Symbolic Revolution: The Russian Nobility and February 1917. Revolutionary Russia, 18(1), 23–46.
- Smith, N. (1968). The Role of Russian Freemasonry in the February Revolution: Another Scrap of Evidence. Slavic Review, 27(4), 604–608.
- White, J. D. (1992). Lenin, the Germans and the February Revolution. Revolutionary Russia, 5(1), 1–21.
- Wildman, A. (1970). The February Revolution in the Russian Army. Soviet Studies, 22(1), 3–23.
- Znamenskii, O. N. (1984). The Petrograd Intelligentsia during the February Revolution. Soviet Studies in History, 23(1), 39–55.
- Transcript. (2017). Round Table on the February Revolution of 1917 in Russian History. Russian Studies in History, 56(1), 6–50.

=== October ===
- Chary, F. (1975). The Russian Masses in the October Revolution 1917. European Labor and Working Class History, 7 (6–7).
- Daniels, R. V. (1967). Red October: The Bolshevik Revolution of 1917. New York: Charles Scribner's Sons.
- Hedlin, M. (1975). Zinoviev's Revolutionary Tactics in 1917. Slavic Review, 34(1), 19–43.
- Jones, D. (1976). The Officers and the October Revolution. Soviet Studies, 28(2), 207–223.
- Medvedev, R. A. (1979). The October Revolution. New York: Columbia University Press.
- Nikolsky, S. A. (2018). The October Revolution and the Constants of Russian Being. Russian Social Science Review, 59(1), 22–38.
- Rabinowitch, A. (1985). Prelude to Revolution: The Petrograd Bolsheviks and the July 1917 Uprising. Bloomington: Indiana University Press.
- ———. (2017). The Bolsheviks Come to Power: The Revolution of 1917 in Petrograd. London: Pluto Press. (Note: See also The Bolsheviks in Power: The First Year of Soviet Rule in Petrograd in Early Soviet State Formation section.)
- Rosenberg, W., & Koenker, D. (1987). The Limits of Formal Protest: Worker Activism and Social Polarization in Petrograd and Moscow, March to October, 1917. The American Historical Review, 92(2), 296–326.
- Rucker, R. (1979). Workers' Control of Production in the October Revolution and Civil War. Science & Society, 43(2), 158–185.
- Steinberg, M. D. & Hrustalëv, V. (2006). The Fall of the Romanovs: Political Dreams and Personal Struggles in a Time of Revolution. New Haven, CT: Yale University Press.

== Violence and terror ==
- Argenbright, R. (1991). Red Tsaritsyn: Precursor of Stalinist Terror. Revolutionary Russia, 4(2), 157–183. (Note: See Battle of Tsaritsyn.)
- Böhler, J. (2015). Enduring Violence: The Postwar Struggles in East-Central Europe, 1917-21. Journal of Contemporary History, 50(1), 58–77.
- Courtois, S. (2015). Black Book of Communism: Crimes, Terror, Repression. Cambridge: Harvard University Press.
- Geifman, A. (1993). Thou Shalt Kill. Princeton: Princeton University Press.
- ———. (1999). Russia Under the Last Tsar: Opposition and Subversion, 1894-1917. Hoboken: Wiley-Blackwell.
- ———. (2000). Entangled in Terror: The Azef Affair and the Russian Revolution. Landham: Rowman & Littlefield.
- ———. (2010). Death Orders: The Vanguard of Modern Terrorism in Revolutionary Russia. Santa Barbara: Praeger.
- Gerson, L. D. (1985). The Secret Police in Lenin"s Russia. Philadelphia, PA: Temple University Press.
- Gerwarth, R., & Horne, J. (2011). Vectors of Violence: Paramilitarism in Europe after the Great War, 1917–1923. The Journal of Modern History, 83(3), 489–512.
- ———. (2013). War in Peace: Paramilitary Violence in Europe after the Great War. Oxford: Oxford University Press.
- Gross, J. T. (1988). Revolution from Abroad: The Soviet Conquest of Poland's Western Ukraine and Western Belorussia (Expanded Edition). Princeton: Princeton University Press.
- Holquist, P. (1997). Conduct Merciless Mass Terror: Decossackization on the Don, 1919. Cahiers Du Monde Russe, 38(1/2), 127–162.
- ———. (2003). Violent Russia, Deadly Marxism? Russia in the Epoch of Violence, 1905-21. Kritika: Explorations in Russian and Eurasian History. 4(3), 627–652.
- Kenez, P. (1992). Pogroms and White Ideology in the Russian Civil War. In Klier, J. D. & Lambroza, S. (Eds.), Pogroms: Anti-Jewish Violence in Modern Russian History (293–313). Cambridge: Cambridge University Press.
- Leggett, G. (1981). The Cheka: Lenin's Political Police. New York: Oxford University Press.
- Lohr, E. (2001). The Russian Army and the Jews: Mass Deportation, Hostages, and Violence during World War I. The Russian Review, 60(3), 404–419.
- Martin, T. (1998). The Origins of Soviet Ethnic Cleansing. The Journal of Modern History, 70(4), 813–861.
- Mayer, A. J. (2000). The Furies: Violence and Terror in the French and Russian Revolutions. Princeton: Princeton University Press.
- Melancon, M. (2009). Revolutionary Culture in the Early Soviet Republic: Communist Executive Committees versus the Cheka, Fall 1918. Jahrbücher Für Geschichte Osteuropas, 57(1), 1–22.
- Nation, R. C. (2018). Black Earth, Red Star: A History of Soviet Security Policy, 1917-1991. Ithaca: Cornell University Press.
- Pethybridge, R. (1971). The Bolsheviks and Technical Disorder, 1917-1918. The Slavonic and East European Review, 49(116), 410–424.
- Rummel, R. J. (1990). Lethal Politics: Soviet Genocides and Mass Murders Since 1917. London: Transaction Publishers/Routledge
- Ryan, James. (2012). Lenin's Terror: The Ideological Origins of Early Soviet State Violence. London: Routledge.
- Sanborn, J. (2010). The Genesis of Russian Warlordism: Violence and Governance during the First World War and the Civil War. Contemporary European History, 19(3), 195–213.
- Verhoeven, C. (2009). The Odd Man Karakozov: Imperial Russia, Modernity, and the Birth of Terrorism. Ithaca: Cornell University Press.
- Wędziagolski, K. & Swietochowski, T. (1988). Boris Savinkov: Portrait of a Terrorist. Clifton: Kingston Press.
- Wróbel, P. (2003). The Seeds of Violence. The Brutalization of an East European Region, 1917–1921. Journal of Modern European History, 1(1), 125–149.

== Government ==
- Russian Soviet Republic 1918 Constitution. Text from the Marxist Archive
- Becker, Seymour. (2004). Russia's Protectorates in Central Asia: Bukhara and Khiva, 1865-1924. London: Routledge.
- Blank, S. J. (1994). The Sorcerer as Apprentice: Stalin as Commissar of Nationalities, 1917-1924. Westport, CT: Greenwood Press.
- Borys, J. & Armstrong, J. A. (1980). The Sovietization of Ukraine, 1917-1923: The Communist Doctrine and Practice of National Self-Determination. Edmonton: Canadian Institute of Ukrainian Studies.
- Duval, C. (1979). Yakov M. Sverdlov and the All-Russian Central Executive Committee of Soviets (VTsIK): A Study in Bolshevik Consolidation of Power, October 1917-July 1918. Soviet Studies, 31(1), 3–22. (Note: See Yakov Sverdlov.)
- Edmondson, C. (1977). The Politics of Hunger: The Soviet Response to Famine, 1921. Soviet Studies, 29(4), 506–518.
- Gregor, R. (2019). Resolutions and Decisions of the Communist Party of the Soviet Union, Volume 2: The Early Soviet Period 1917-1929. Toronto: University of Toronto Press.
- Holquist, P. (2003). Violent Russia, Deadly Marxism? Russia in the Epoch of Violence, 1905-21. Kritika: Explorations in Russian and Eurasian History. 4(3), 627–652.
- Kenez, P. (2003). The Birth of the Propaganda State: Soviet Methods of Mass Mobilization, 1917-1929. Cambridge: Cambridge University Press.
- Kotkin, Stephen. (2014). Stalin: Volume I: Paradoxes of Power, 1878–1928. New York: Penguin Press. (Note: While primarily a biography of Stalin, contains significant information about the early Soviet state formation.)
- Leggett, George. (1981). The Cheka: Lenin's Political Police. New York: Oxford University Press.
- Lonergan, G. (2015). Where Was the Conscience of the Revolution? The Military Opposition at the Eighth Party Congress (March 1919). Slavic Review, 74(4), 832–849.
- Rigby, T. H. (1979). Lenin's Government: Sovnarkom 1917–1922. Cambridge: Cambridge University Press.
- Pipes, R. (1950). The First Experiment in Soviet National Policy: The Bashkir Republic, 1917-1920. The Russian Review, 9(4), 303–319. (Note: See Bashkir Autonomous Soviet Socialist Republic.)
- ———. (1997). The Formation of the Soviet Union: Communism and Nationalism, 1917-1923 (Revised Edition). Cambridge: Harvard University Press.
- ———. (2011). Russia Under the Bolshevik Regime: 1919–1924. New York: Knopf.
- Rabinowitch, Alexander. (2007). The Bolsheviks in Power: The First Year of Soviet Rule in Petrograd. Bloomington: Indiana University Press.
- Retish, A. B. (2011). Russia's Peasants in Revolution and Civil War: Citizenship, Identity, and the Creation of the Soviet State, 1914–1922. Cambridge: Cambridge University Press.
- Rigby, T. (2011). Lenin's Government: Sovnarkom 1917-1922 (Cambridge Russian, Soviet and Post-Soviet Studies). Cambridge: Cambridge University Press.
- Ryan, James. (2012). Lenin's Terror: The Ideological Origins of Early Soviet State Violence. London: Routledge.
- Sabol, Steven. (1995). The Creation of Soviet Central Asia: The 1924 national delimitation. Central Asian Survey, 14(2), 225–241.
- Saparov, A. (2010). From Conflict to Autonomy: The Making of the South Ossetian Autonomous Region 1918-1922. Europe-Asia Studies, 62(1), 99–123.
- Schapiro, L. (1977). The Origin of the Communist Autocracy: Political Opposition in the Soviet State; First Phase 1917-1922 (2nd Edition). Cambridge: Harvard University Press.
- ———. (1978). The Communist Party of the Soviet Union (2nd Edition). London: Methuen Publishing.
- Smith, J. (1999). The Bolsheviks and the National Question, 1917-1923. London: Macmillan.
- Slezkine, Yuri. (2017). The House of Government: A Saga of the Russian Revolution. Princeton: Princeton University Press.
- Thatcher, I. D. (2016). The Russian Revolutionary Constitution and Pamphlet Literature in the 1917 Russian Revolution. Europe-Asia Studies, 68(10), 1635–1653.
- Thomson, J. M. (1987). The Origin of the Communist Autocracy: Political Opposition in the Soviet State, First Phase 1917–1922. New York: Palgrave Macmillan.
- Velychenko, S. (2010). State Building in Revolutionary Ukraine: A Comparative Study of Government and Bureaucrats, 1917–22. Toronto: University of Toronto Press.

== Foreign policy and external relations ==
- Buzinkai, D. (1967). The Bolsheviks, the League of Nations and the Paris Peace Conference, 1919. Soviet Studies, 19(2), 257–263.
- Carley, M. (2000). Episodes from the Early Cold War: Franco-Soviet Relations, 1917-1927. Europe-Asia Studies, 52(7), 1275–1305.
- Debo, R. K. (1979). Revolution and Survival: The Foreign Policy of Soviet Russia, 1917–18. Toronto: University of Toronto Press.
- ———. (2014). Survival and Consolidation: The Foreign Policy of Soviet Russia, 1918–1921. Montreal, QC: McGill-Queen's University Press.
- Ewing, T. (1980). Russia, China, and the Origins of the Mongolian People's Republic, 1911-1921: A Reappraisal. The Slavonic and East European Review, 58(3), 399–421.
- Isono, F. (1979). Soviet Russia and the Mongolian Revolution of 1921. Past & Present, 83 116–140.
- Materski, W. (2000). The Second Polish Republic in Soviet Foreign Policy (1918-1939). The Polish Review, 45(3), 331–345.
- Service, R. W. (2011). Spies and Commissars: Bolshevik Russia and the West. New York: Macmillan.
- Spring, D. W. (1988). Russia and the Franco-Russian Alliance, 1905-14: Dependence or Interdependence? The Slavonic and East European Review, 66(4), 564–592.
- Uldricks, T. J. (1979). Diplomacy and Ideology: The Origins of Soviet Foreign Relations, 1917-1930. London: Sage Publications.
- White, S. (2010). The Origins of Detente: The Genoa Conference and Soviet-Western Relations, 1921-1922 (Cambridge Russian, Soviet and Post-Soviet Studies). Cambridge: Cambridge University Press.

== Ideology, philosophy, and propaganda ==
- Bonnell, V. E. (1999). Iconography of Power: Soviet Political Posters under Lenin and Stalin. Berkeley: University of California Press.
- Burbank, J. (1987). Intelligentsia & Revolution: Russian Views of Bolshevism, 1917-1922. New York: Oxford University Press.
- ———. (1995). Lenin and the Law in Revolutionary Russia. Slavic Review, 54(1), 23–44.
- Cohen, S. F. (1970). Bukharin, Lenin and the Theoretical Foundations of Bolshevism. Soviet Studies, 21(4), 436–457.
- Day, R. B. (1977). Trotsky and Preobrazhensky: The Troubled Unity of the Left Opposition. Studies in Comparative Communism, 10(1/2), 69–86.
- Donald, M. (1993). Marxism and Revolution: Karl Kautsky and the Russian Marxists, 1900-1924. New Haven: Yale University Press. (Note: see Karl Kautsky.)
- Erley, M. (2021). On Russian Soil: Myth and Materiality. DeKalb: Northern Illinois University Press.
- Evans, A. (1987). Rereading Lenin's State and Revolution. Slavic Review, 46(1), 1–19.
- Glisic, I. (2018). The Futurist Files: Avant-Garde, Politics, and Ideology in Russia, 1905–1930. DeKalb: Northern Illinois University Press.
- Gregor, A. J. (2012). Chapter 4, Leninism: Revolution as Religion. In Totalitarianism and Political Religion: An Intellectual History. Palo Alto: Stanford University Press.
- Harding, N. (2010). Lenin's Political Thought (2 vols.). Chicago: Haymarket.
- Hemmington, T. (1977). Trotsky, War Communism, and the Origin of the NEP. Studies in Comparative Communism, 10(1/2), 44–60.
- Heyman, N. M. (1977). Leon Trotsky: Propagandist to the Red Army. Studies in Comparative Communism, 10(1/2), 34–43.
- Kenez, P. (1980). The Ideology of the White Movement. Soviet Studies, 32(1), 58–83.
- Kirby, D. (1986). War, Peace and Revolution: International Socialism at the Crossroads, 1914-1918. New York: St. Martin's Press.
- Lane, D. S. (1981). Leninism: A Sociological Interpretation. Cambridge: Cambridge University Press.
- Liebman, M. (1975). Leninism Under Lenin. Chicago: Haymarket Books.
- Lindemann, A. S. (1974). The "Red Years": European Socialism versus Bolshevism, 1919-1921. Berkeley: University of California Press.
- Levine, N. (1985). Lenin's Utopianism. Studies in Soviet Thought. 30(2), 95–107.
- Melograni, P. (1989). Lenin and the Myth of World Revolution: Ideology and Reasons of State, 1917-1920. Atlantic Highlands: Humanities Press International.
- Meyer, A. G. (1986). Leninism. Cambridge: Harvard University Press.
- Nash, A. (1990). Leninism and Democracy. Theoria: A Journal of Social and Political Theory, 76, 19–32.
- Pons, S., & Smith, S. A. (Eds.). (2017). The Cambridge History of Communism. (Vol. 1). Cambridge: Cambridge University Press. (Note: The notes at the end of each essay (chapter) includes substantial bibliographic entries.)
- Ree, E. van. (2010). Lenin's Conception of Socialism in One Country, 1915–17. Revolutionary Russia, 23(2), 159–181.
- Rosenberg, W. G. (1990). Bolshevik Visions: First Phase of the Cultural Revolution in Soviet Russia. Ann Arbor, MI: University of Michigan Press.
- Rowney, D. K. (1977). Development of Trotsky's Theory of Revolution, 1898–1907. Studies in Comparative Communism, 10(1/2), 18–33.
- Ryan, J. (2012). Lenin's Terror: The Ideological Origins of Early Soviet State Violence. London: Routledge.
- Sabine, G. (1961). The Ethics of Bolshevism. The Philosophical Review, 70(3), 299–319.
- Schapiro, L. B. (1984). The Russian Revolutions of 1917: The Origins of Modern Communism. New York: Basic Books.
- Swain, G. (1991) Before The Fighting Started: A discussion on the theme of 'The Third Way'. Revolutionary Russia, 4(2), 210–234.
- Theen, R. (1972). The Idea of the Revolutionary State: Tkachev, Trotsky, and Lenin. The Russian Review, 31(4), 383–397.
- ———. (2004). Lenin: Genesis and Development of a Revolutionary. Princeton: Princeton University Press.
- Treadgold, D. W. (2017). Lenin and His Rivals: The Struggle for Russia's Future, 1898-1906. London: Routledge.
- Uldricks, T. J. (1979). Diplomacy and Ideology: The Origins of Soviet Foreign Relations, 1917-1930. London: Sage Publications.
- Yefimenko, H., & Olynyk, M. D. (2017). Bolshevik Language Policy as a Reflection of the Ideas and Practice of Communist Construction, 1919-1933. Harvard Ukrainian Studies, 35(1/4), 145–167.
- White, J. D. (2001). Lenin: The Practice and Theory of Revolution. New York: Red Globe Press.

== Background ==
- Baron, S. H. (1963). Plekhanov: The Father of Russian Marxism. Stanford: Stanford University Press. (Note: See Georgi Plekhanov.)
- Harison, C. (2007). The Paris Commune of 1871, the Russian Revolution of 1905, and the Shifting of the Revolutionary Tradition. History and Memory, 19(2), 5–42.
- Perrie, M. (2011). The Agrarian Policy of the Russian Socialist-Revolutionary Party: From its Origins through the Revolution of 1905-1907 (Cambridge Russian, Soviet and Post-Soviet Studies). Cambridge: Cambridge University Press.
- Rogger, H. (2016). Russia in the Age of Modernisation and Revolution 1881 - 1917. New York: Routledge.
- Venturi, F. (1960). Roots of Revolution: A History of the Populist and Socialist Movements in Nineteenth Century Russia. London: Weidenfeld & Nicolson.

== Non-Bolshevik political parties ==
- Ascher, A., & Stevenson, P. (1976). The Mensheviks in the Russian Revolution. London: Thames and Hudson.
- Basil, J. D. (1984). The Mensheviks in the Revolution of 1917. Columbus, OH: Slavica Publishers.
- Broido, V. (1987). Lenin and the Mensheviks: The Persecution of Socialists under Bolshevism. Boulder, CO: Westview Press.
- Brovkin, V. N. (1983). The Mensheviks' Political Comeback: The Elections to the Provincial City Soviets in Spring 1918. The Russian Review, 42(1), 1–50.
- ———. (1984). The Mensheviks Under Attack The Transformation of Soviet Politics, June-September 1918. Jahrbücher Für Geschichte Osteuropas, 32(3), Neue Folge, 378–391.
- ———. (1987). The Mensheviks after October: Socialist Opposition and the Rise of the Bolshevik Dictatorship. Ithaca: Cornell University Press.
- ———. (1994). Behind the Front Lines of the Civil War: Political Parties and Social Movements in Russia, 1918–1922. Princeton: Princeton University Press.
- Cinnella, E. (1997). The Tragedy of the Russian Revolution Promise and Default of the Left Socialist Revolutionaries in 1918. Cahiers Du Monde Russe, 38(1/2), 45–82.
- Daniels, R. V. (1960). The Conscience of the Revolution: Communist Opposition in Soviet Russia. Cambridge: Harvard University Press.
- Galili, Z. (1989). The Menshevik Leaders in the Russian Revolution: Social Realities and Political Strategies. Princeton: Princeton University Press.
- Haimson, L. H., Dallin, D., & Vakar, G. (1974). Mensheviks: From the Revolution of 1917 to the Second World War. Chicago: University of Chicago Press.
- Hatch, J. (1987). Working-Class Politics in Moscow during the Early NEP: Mensheviks and Workers' Organisations, 1921-1922. Soviet Studies, 39(4), 556–574.
- Jansen, M. & Sanders, J. (1984). A Show Trial Under Lenin: The trial of the Socialist Revolutionaries, Moscow 1922. The Hague: Nijhoff.
- Kochan, L. (1967). Kadet Policy in 1917 and the Constituent Assembly. The Slavonic and East European Review, 45(104), 183–192.
- Kowalski, R. I. (1991). The Bolshevik Party in Conflict: The Left Communist Opposition of 1918. Basingstoke, UK: Macmillan.
- Lazarski, C. (2008). The Lost Opportunity: Attempts at Unification of the anti-Bolsheviks, 1917-1919. Lanham: University Press of America.
- Radkey, O. H. (1950). Russia Goes to the Polls: The Election to the All-Russian Constituent Assembly, 1917. Cambridge: Harvard University Press.
- ———. (1953). An Alternative to Bolshevism: The Program of Russian Social Revolutionism. The Journal of Modern History, 25(1), 25–39.
- ———. (1964). The Sickle Under the Hammer: The Russian Socialist Revolutionaries in the Early Months of Soviet Rule. Berkeley: University Presses of California.
- Rosenberg, W. G. (1974). Liberals in the Russian Revolution: The Constitutional Democratic Party, 1917–1921. Princeton: Princeton University Press.
- Schapiro, L. (1977). The Origin of the Communist Autocracy: Political Opposition in the Soviet State; First Phase 1917-1922 (2nd Edition). Cambridge: Harvard University Press.
- Schrader, D. (2021). 'You Don't Treat Parliaments That Way!' Revolutionary Practices of Representation at Samara's Peasant Congress, May–June 1917. The Slavonic and East European Review, 99(3), 484–519.
- Smith, S. B. (2013). Captives of Revolution: The Socialist Revolutionaries and the Bolshevik Dictatorship, 1918–1923. Pittsburgh, PA: University of Pittsburgh Press.
- Swain, G.R. (1994). Maugham, Masaryk and the 'Mensheviks'. Revolutionary Russia, 7(1), 78–97.
- Thatcher, I. (2009). The St Petersburg/Petrograd Mezhraionka, 1913—1917: The Rise and Fall of a Russian Social Democratic Workers' Party Unity Faction. The Slavonic and East European Review, 87(2), 284–321.
- Tyrkova-Williams, A. (1953). The Cadet Party. The Russian Review, 12(3), 173–186.

== The Russian Civil War ==
- Argenbright, R. (1991). Red Tsaritsyn: Precursor of Stalinist Terror. Revolutionary Russia, 4(2), 157–183. (Note: See Battle of Tsaritsyn.)
- Banerji, A. (1987). Commissars and Bagmen: Russia During the Civil War, 1918–21. Studies in History, 3(2), 233–273.
- Berk, S. M. (1973). The Democratic Counterrevolution: Komuch and the Civil War on the Volga. Canadian-American Slavic Studies, 7(4), v-459.
- Bradley, J. F. (1991). The Czechoslovak Legion in Russia: 1914–1920. New York: Columbia University Press.
- Bullock, D. (2008). The Russian Civil War 1918–22. Oxford: Osprey Publishing.
- Fic, V. M. (1978). The Bolsheviks and the Czechoslovak Legion: The Origin of their Armed Conflict, March–May 1918. New Delhi: Abhinav Publications.
- Footman, D. (1962). Civil War in Russia. New York: Praeger.
- ———. (2007). Red Attack, White Resistance: The Civil War in South Russia 1918. Washington, DC: New Academia Publishing.
- ———. (2008). Red Advance, White Defeat: The Civil War in South Russia 1919–1920. Washington, DC: New Academia Publishing.
- Landis, E. C. (2004). Between Village and Kremlin: Confronting State Food Procurement in Civil War Tambov, 1919–20. The Russian Review, 63(1), 70–88.
- ———. (2008). Bandits and Partisans: The Antonov Movement in the Russian Civil War. Pittsburgh, PA: University of Pittsburgh Press. (Note: For more about the Antonov Movement, see Tambov Rebellion)
- ———. (2010). Who Were the "Greens"? Rumor and Collective Identity in the Russian Civil War. The Russian Review, 69(1), 30–46.
- Lincoln, W. B. (1989). Red Victory: A History of the Russian Civil War. New York: Simon and Schuster.
- Marshall, A. (2009). The Terek People's Republic, 1918: Coalition Government In The Russian Revolution. Revolutionary Russia, 22(2), 203–221. (Note: See Terek Soviet Republic.)
- Mawdsley, E. (2009). The Russian Civil War. New York: Pegasus Books.
- Mentzel, P. (2017). Chaos and Utopia: The Anarchists in the Russian Revolution and Civil War. The Independent Review, 22(2), 173–181.
- Raleigh, D. J. (2002). Experiencing Russia's Civil War: Politics, Society, and Revolutionary Culture in Saratov, 1917–1922. Princeton: Princeton University Press.
- Pethybridge, R. (2014). Spread of the Russian Revolution: Essays on 1917. New York: Palgrave Macmillan.
- Seregny, S. (2000). Peasants, Nation, and Local Government in Wartime Russia. Slavic Review, 59(2), 336–342.
- Smele, J. (2016). The "Russian" Civil Wars, 1916–1926: Ten Years That Shook the World. New York: Oxford University Press.
- Swain, G. (2014). The Origins of the Russian Civil War. London, UK. Routledge.

=== Red Army ===
- Erickson, J. (1962). The Soviet High Command 1918–41 – A Military-Political History. London: MacMillan.
- Figes, O. (1990). The Red Army and Mass Mobilization during the Russian Civil War 1918–1920. Past & Present, (129), 168–211.
- Ganin, A. V. (2013). Workers and Peasants Red Army 'General Staff Personalities' Defecting to the Enemy Side in 1918–1921. The Journal of Slavic Military Studies, 26(2), 259–309
- Moynahan, B. (1989). Claws of the Bear: The History of the Red Army from the Revolution to the Present. Boston: Houghton Mifflin.
- Reese, R. R. (2000). The Soviet Military Experience: A History of the Soviet Army, 1917–1991. London: Routledge.
- Whitewood, P. (2016). Nationalities in a Class War: «Foreign» Soldiers in the Red Army during the Russian Civil War. Journal of Modern European History, 14(3), 342–358.
- Woodall, F. (2009). The Bolsheviks and the Red Army 1918–1921 (Cambridge Russian, Soviet and Post-Soviet Studies). Cambridge: Cambridge University Press.

=== White armies ===
- Kenez, P. (1980). The Ideology of the White Movement. Soviet Studies, 32(1), 58–83.
- Lazarski, C. (1992). White Propaganda Efforts in the South during the Russian Civil War, 1918–1919. Slavonic and East European Review, 70 (4), 688–707.
- Novikova, L., & Bernstein, S. (2018). An Anti-Bolshevik Alternative: The White Movement and the Civil War in the Russian North. Madison, WI: University of Wisconsin Press.

== The Revolution and Civil War in the Russian Empire (1904–1926) ==
- Hopkirk, P. (1985). Setting the East Ablaze: Lenin's Dream of an Empire in Asia. New York: W W Norton.
- Hughes, J. (2009). Stalin, Siberia and the Crisis of the New Economic Policy (Cambridge Russian, Soviet and Post-Soviet Studies). Cambridge: Cambridge University Press.
- Lohr, E., Tolz, V., Semyonov, A., & Hagen, M. (Eds.). (2014). The Empire and Nationalism at War. Bloomington IN: Slavica.
- Radkey, O. H. (1976). The Unknown Civil War in Soviet Russia: A Study of the Green Movement in the Tambov Region, 1920–1921. Palo Alto: Hoover Institution Press.
- Rieber, A. J. (2014). The Struggle for the Eurasian Borderlands: From the Rise of Early Modern Empires to the End of the First World War. New York: Cambridge University Press.
- Rosenberg, W. G. (1961). A.I. Denikin and the Anti-Bolshevik movement in South Russia. Amherst: Amherst College Press.
- Singleton, S. (1966). The Tambov Revolt (1920–1921). Slavic Review, 25(3), 497–512.
- Snyder, T. (2003). The Reconstruction of Nations: Poland, Ukraine, Lithuania, Belarus, 1569–1999. New Haven: Yale University Press. (Note: For Lithuania and Belarus, see Chapters 2–3; for Ukraine, see Chapters 6–7; content on Poland focuses on World War II.)
- Staliūnas, D., & Aoshima, Y., (eds.). (2021). The Tsar, the Empire, and the Nation: Dilemmas of Nationalization in Russia's Western Borderlands, 1905–1915. Historical Studies in Eastern Europe and Eurasia. Budapest: Central European University Press.
- White, J. (1968). The Kornilov Affair. A Study in Counter-Revolution. Soviet Studies, 20(2), 187–205.

=== Ukraine ===
- Adams, A. E. (1963). Bolsheviks in the Ukraine: The Second Campaign, 1918–1919. New Haven: Yale University Press.
- Baker, M. (1999). Beyond the National: Peasants, Power, and Revolution in Ukraine. Journal of Ukrainian Studies, 24(1), 39–67.
- Borys, J. & Armstrong, J. A. (1980). The Sovietization of Ukraine, 1917–1923: The Communist Doctrine and Practice of National Self-Determination. Edmonton: Canadian Institute of Ukrainian Studies.
- Bruski, J. J., & Bałuk-Ulewiczowa, T. (2016). Between Prometheism and Realpolitik: Poland and Soviet Ukraine, 1921–1926. Krakow: Jagiellonian University Press.
- Guthier, S. (1979). The Popular Base of Ukrainian Nationalism in 1917. Slavic Review, 38(1), 30–47.
- Hunczak, T. (1977). The Ukraine 1917–1921: A Study in Revolution. Cambridge: Harvard Ukrainian Research Institute.
- Kappeler, A., Kohut, Z. E., Sysyn, F. E., & von Hagen, M. (Eds.). (2003). Culture, nation, and identity: the Ukrainian-Russian encounter, 1600–1945. Toronto: Canadian Institute of Ukrainian Studies Press.
- Kenez, P. (1971, 1977). Civil war in South Russia (2 vols.). Berkeley: University of California Press.
- Kuchabsʹkyĭ, V. & Fagan, G. (2009). Western Ukraine in Conflict with Poland and Bolshevism, 1918–1923. Toronto: Canadian Institute of Ukrainian Studies Press.
- Procyk, A. (1995). Russian Nationalism and Ukraine: The Nationality Policy of the Volunteer Army during the Civil War. Edmonton: Canadian Institute of Ukrainian Studies Press.
- Reshetar, J. S. (1952). The Ukrainian Revolution, 1917–1920, A Study in Nationalism. Princeton: Princeton University Press.
- Shkandrij, M. (2001). Russia and Ukraine: Literature and the Discourse of Empire from Napoleonic to Postcolonial Times. Montreal & Kingston: McGill-Queen's Press.
- Skirda, A. (2004). Nestor Makhno, Anarchy's Cossack: The Struggle for Free Soviets in the Ukraine 1917–1921. Edinburgh: AK Press.
- Stachiw, M. (1969). Western Ukraine at the Turning Point of Europe's History 1918–1923. (2 vols.). New York: Shevchenko Scientific Society.
- Velychenko, S. (2010). State Building in Revolutionary Ukraine: A Comparative Study of Government and Bureaucrats, 1917–22. Toronto: University of Toronto Press.
- Veryha, W. (1984). Famine in Ukraine in 1921–1923 and the Soviet Government's Countermeasures. Nationalities Papers, 12(2), 265–286.
- Von, H. & Hunczak, T. (1977). The Ukraine, 1917–1921: A Study in Revolution. Cambridge: Harvard University Press.
- Von, H. & Herbert J. (2011). War in a European Borderland: Occupations and Occupation Plans in Galicia and Ukraine; 1914–1918. Seattle: University of Washington.
- Yekelchyk, S. (2019). The Ukrainian Meanings of 1918 and 1919. Harvard Ukrainian Studies, 36(1/2), 73–86.

=== The Baltics, Finland and Siberia ===
- Bisher, J. (2009). White Terror: Cossack Warlords of the Trans-Siberian. Abingdon: Routledge.
- Footman, D. (1954). Siberian partisans in the Civil War. Oxford: St. Antony's College.
- Jansen, M. (1986). International Class Solidarity or Foreign Intervention? Internationalists and Latvian Rifles in the Russian Revolution and the Civil War. International Review of Social History, 31(1), 68–79.
- Kirby, D. G. (1978). Revolutionary Ferment in Finland and the Origins of the Civil War 1917–1918. Scandinavian Economic History Review, 26(1), 15–35.
- Manninen, O. (1978). Red, White and Blue in Finland, 1918. Scandinavian Journal of History, 3(1–4), 229–249.
- Naumov, I. V. & Collins, D. N. (2006). The History of Siberia. New York: Routledge. (Note: See Chapters 3 ("Tiny Revolutions in Russia") and 6 ("The History of Siberia").)
- Novikova, L. G. (2008). Northerners into Whites: Popular Participation in the Counter-Revolution in Arkhangel'sk Province, Summer – Autumn 1918. Europe-Asia Studies, 60(2), 277–293.
- Page, S. W. (1970). Formation of the Baltic States: A Study of the Effects of Great Power Politics Upon the Emergence of Lithuania, Latvia, and Estonia. Cambridge: Harvard University Press.
- Parrott, A. (2002). The Baltic States from 1914 to 1923: The First World War and the Wars of Independence. Baltic Defence Review, 2(8), 131–158.
- Pereira, N. (1988). The "Democratic Counterrevolution" of 1918 in Siberia. Nationalities Papers, 16(1), 71–94.
- Petroff, S. (2000). Remembering a Forgotten War: Civil War in Eastern European Russia and Siberia, 1918–1920. Boulder: East European Monographs.
- Quenoy, P. (2003). Warlordism à la russe: Baron von Ungern-Sternberg's anti-Bolshevik Crusade, 1917–21. Revolutionary Russia, 16(2), 1–27.
- Senn, A. E. (1995). The Bolsheviks' Acceptance of Baltic Independence, 1919. Journal of Baltic Studies, 26(2), 145–150.
- Shimkin, Michael. & Shimkin, Mary. (1985). From Golden Horn to Golden Gate: The Flight of the Siberian Russian Flotilla. Californian History, 64(4), 290–294.
- Smele, J. D. (1997). Civil War in Siberia: The Anti-Bolshevik Government of Admiral Kolchak, 1918–1920. Cambridge: Cambridge University Press.
- Smith, C. J. (1958). Finland and the Russian Revolution: 1917–1922. Athens: University of Georgia Press.
- Tarulis, A. N. (1959). Soviet Policy toward The Baltic States, 1918–1940. Notre Dame: University of Notre Dame Press.
- Thomas, N., Boltowsky, T., & Shumate, J. (2019). Armies of the Baltic Independence Wars 1918–20. London: Bloomsbury.
- Upton, A. F. (1980). The Finnish Revolution, 1917–1918. Minneapolis, MN: University of Minnesota Press.
- Vardys, S. V. & Misiunas, R. J. (Eds.). (1990). The Baltic States in Peace and War, 1917–1945. University Park, PA: Penn State University Press.

=== Transcaucasia and the Middle East ===
- Allen, W. E. D., & Muratoff, P. (2011). Caucasian Battlefields: A History of the Wars on the Turco-Caucasian Border 1828–1921. Cambridge: Cambridge University Press.
- Andriewsky, O. (2004). The Making of the Generation of 1917: Towards a Collective Biography. Journal of Ukrainian Studies, 29(1–2), 004), 19–37.
- Arslanian, A. & Nichols, R. (1979). Nationalism and the Russian Civil War: The Case of Volunteer Army–Armenian Relations, 1918–20. Soviet Studies, 31(4), 559–573.
- Gökay, B. (1998). The Battle for Baku (May–September 1918): A Peculiar Episode in the History of the Caucasus. Middle Eastern Studies, 34(1), 30–50.
- Hasanli, J. (2018). The Sovietization of Azerbaijan: The South Caucasus in the Triangle of Russia, Turkey, and Iran, 1920–1922. Salt Lake City: University of Utah Press.
- Jones, S. (1988). The Establishment of Soviet Power in Transcaucasia: The Case of Georgia 1921–1928. Soviet Studies, 40(4), 616–639.
- Kazemzadeh, F. (1951). The Struggle for Transcaucasia (1917–1921). New York: Philosophical Library.
- Kenez, P. (1971, 1977). Civil war in South Russia (2 vols.). Berkeley: University of California Press.
- Knollys, D. E. (1926). Military operations in Transcaspia, 1918–1919. Journal of The Royal Central Asian Society, 13(2), 89–110.
- Arsène Saparov (2018) Re-negotiating the Boundaries of the Permissible: The National(ist) Revival in Soviet Armenia and Moscow's Response, Europe-Asia Studies, 70:6, 862–883, DOI: 10.1080/09668136.2018.1487207
- Saparov, A. (2012). Why Autonomy? The Making of Nagorno-Karabakh Autonomous Region 1918–1925. Europe-Asia Studies, 64(2), 281–323.
- ———. (2018) Re-negotiating the Boundaries of the Permissible: The National(ist) Revival in Soviet Armenia and Moscow's Response. Europe-Asia Studies, 70(6), 862–883.
- Smith, M. (2001). The Russian Revolution as a National Revolution: Tragic Deaths and Rituals of Remembrance in Muslim Azerbaijan (1907–1920). Jahrbücher Für Geschichte Osteuropas, 49(3), 363–388.
- Suny, R. G. (1972). The Baku Commune, 1917–1918: Class and Nationality in the Russian Revolution. Princeton: Princeton University Press.
- ———. (1996). Transcaucasia, Nationalism, and Social Change: Essays in the History of Armenia, Azerbaijan, and Georgia. Ann Arbor: University of Michigan Press.
- Swietochowski, T. (2010). Russian Azerbaijan, 1905–1920: The Shaping of a National Identity in a Muslim Community (Cambridge Russian, Soviet and Post-Soviet Studies). Cambridge: Cambridge University Press.

=== Eastern Europe, Turkey and the Balkans ===
- Biskupski, M. (1990). War and the Diplomacy of Polish Independence, 1914–18. The Polish Review, 35(1), 5–17.
- Bruski, J. J., & Bałuk-Ulewiczowa, T. (2016). Between Prometheism and Realpolitik: Poland and Soviet Ukraine, 1921–1926. Krakow: Jagiellonian University Press.
- Dziewanowski, M. K. (1981). Joseph Piłsudski, a European Federalist, 1918–1922. Palo Alto: Hoover Institution Press. (Note: See Józef Piłsudski.)
- Gasiorowski, Z. (1971). Joseph Piłsudski in the Light of American Reports, 1919–1922. The Slavonic and East European Review,49(116), 425–436.
- Gökay, B. (1996). Turkish Settlement and the Caucasus, 1918–20. Middle Eastern Studies, 32(2), 45–76.
- ———. (1997). Clash of Empires: Turkey between Russian Bolshevism and British Imperialism, 1918–1923. London: I.B. Tauris.
- Latawski, P. (2016). The Reconstruction of Poland, 1914–23. London: Palgrave Macmillan.
- Petroff, S. (2000). Remembering a Forgotten War: Civil War in Eastern European Russia and Siberia, 1918–1920. Boulder: East European Monographs.
- Yamauchi, M. (1991). The Green Crescent Under the Red Star: Enver Pasha in Soviet Russia 1919–1922. Tokyo: Institute for the Study of Languages and Cultures of Asia and Africa.
- Wandycz, P. (1990). Poland on the Map of Europe in 1918. The Polish Review, 35(1), 19–25.

==== The Polish—Soviet War ====
- Borzecki, J. (2008). The Soviet–Polish Peace of 1921 and the Creation of Interwar Europe. New Haven: Yale University Press.
- Dąbrowski, S. (1960). The Peace Treaty of Riga. The Polish Review, 5(1), 3–34.
- Davies, N. (1975). The Missing Revolutionary War: The Polish Campaigns and the Retreat from Revolution in Soviet Russia, 1919–1921. Soviet Studies, 27(2), 178–195.
- Davies, N. (2003). White Eagle, Red Star: The Polish–Soviet War 1919–1920 and The Miracle on the Vistula. New York: Pimlico.
- Drobnicki, J. A. (1997). The Russo–Polish War, 1919–1920: A Bibliography of Materials in English. The Polish Review, 42(1), 95–104.
- Dziewanowski, M. K. (1981). Joseph Piłsudski, A European Federalist, 1918–1922. Palo Alto: Hoover Institution Press.
- Fiddick, T. C. (1990). Russia's Retreat from Poland, 1920: From Permanent Revolution to Peaceful Coexistence. New York: St Martin's Press.
- Latawski, P. (Ed.). (1992). The Reconstruction of Poland, 1914–1923. New York: Palgrave Macmillan.
- Neiberg, M. S. & Jordan, D. (2012). The Eastern Front 1914–1920: From Tannenberg to the Russo–Polish War. London: Amber Books.
- Wandycz, P. S. (1965). Secret Soviet–Polish Peace Talks in 1919. Slavic Review, 24(3), 425–449.
- Wandycz, P. S. (1969). Soviet–Polish Relations, 1917–1921. Cambridge: Harvard University Press.
- Wandycz, P. S. (2017). France and the Polish–Soviet War, 1919–1920. The Polish Review, 62(3), 3–15.
- Zamoyski, A. (2008). Warsaw 1920: Lenin's Failed Conquest of Europe. New York: HarperPress.

=== Central Asia ===
- Becker, Seymour. (2004). Russia's Protectorates in Central Asia: Bukhara and Khiva, 1865–1924. London: Routledge.
- Bennigsen, A. (1983). Muslim Guerilla warfare in the Caucasus (1918–1928). Central Asian Survey, 2(1), 45–56.
- Brower, D. (2012). Turkestan and the Fate of the Russian Empire. Hoboken: Taylor and Francis.
- Broxup, M. (1983) The Basmachi. Central Asian Survey, 2(1), 57–81.
- Carrere d'Encausse, Helene. (1988). Islam and the Russian Empire: Reform and Revolution in Central Asia. Berkeley: University of California Press.
- Chaqueri, C. (1983). The Baku Congress. Central Asian Survey, 2(2), 89–107. (Note: See Congress of the Peoples of the East and Minutes of the Congress of the Peoples of the East. Baku, September 1920.)
- ———. (1995). The Soviet Socialist Republic of Iran, 1920–1921: Birth of the Trauma. Pittsburgh: University of Pittsburgh Press.
- Keller, S. (2020). Russia and Central Asia: Coexistence, Conquest, Convergence. Toronto: University of Toronto Press.
- Khalid, A. (1996). Tashkent 1917: Muslim Politics in Revolutionary Turkestan. Slavic Review, 55(2), 270–296.
- ———. (2000). The Politics of Muslim Cultural Reform: Jadidism in Central Asia. New York: Oxford University Press. (Note: See Jadid.)
- ———. (2001). Nationalizing the Revolution in Central Asia: The Transformation of Jadidism, 1917–1920. In Suny, R. G. and Martin, T. (Eds.). A State of Nations: Empire and Nation-Making in the Age of Lenin and Stalin. (145–164). New York: Oxford University Press.
- ———. (2006). Between Empire and Revolution: New Work on Soviet Central Asia. Kritika: Explorations in Russian and Eurasian History, 7(4), 865–884.
- ———. (2015). Making Uzbekistan: Nation, Empire, and Revolution in the Early USSR. Ithaca: Cornell University Press.
- ———. (2021). Central Asia: A New History from the Imperial Conquests to the Present. Princeton: Princeton University Press.
- Lageard, H. A. (1987). The Revolt of the Basmachi According to Red Army Journals (1920–1922). Central Asian Survey, 6(3), 1–35.
- Marwat, F. R. K. (1985). The Basmachi Movement in Soviet Central Asia: A Study in Political Development. Peshawar: Emjay Books International.
- Massell, G. J. (1974). The Surrogate Proletariat: Moslem Women and Revolutionary Strategies in Soviet Central Asia, 1919–1929. Princeton: Princeton University Press.
- Olcott, M. (1981). The Basmachi or Freemen's Revolt in Turkestan 1918–24. Soviet Studies, 33(3), 352–369.
- Park, A. G. (1957). Bolshevism in Turkestan 1917–1927. New York: Columbia University Press.
- Sabol, Steven. (1995). The Creation of Soviet Central Asia: The 1924 National Delimitation. Central Asian Survey, 14(2), 225–241.
- Sareen, T. R. (1989). British Intervention in Central Asia and Trans-Caucasia. New Delhi: Anmol Publications.
- Share, M. (2010). The Russian Civil War in Chinese Turkestan, 1918–1921. Europe-Asia Studies, 62(3), 389–420.
- Sokol, E. D. (1954/2016). The Revolt of 1916 in Russian Central Asia. Baltimore: Johns Hopkins University Press.
- Sonyel, S. R. (1990). Enver Pasha and the Basmaji Movement in Central Asia. Middle Eastern Studies, 26(1), 52–64. (Note: See Basmachi movement.)
- Vaidyanath, R. (1967). The Formation of the Soviet Central Asian Republics: A Study in Soviet Nationalities Policy, 1917–1936. New Delhi: People's Publishing House.
- White, S. (1984). Soviet Russia and the Asian Revolution, 1917–1924. Review of International Studies, 10(3), 219–232.

== International involvement in the Revolution and Civil War ==
- Baron, N. (2007). The King of Karelia: Col P.J. Woods and the British Intervention in North Russia 1918–1919. London: Francis Boutle Publishers.
- Brinkley, G. A. (1966). The Volunteer Army and Allied Intervention in South Russia, 1917–1921. Notre Dame: University of Notre Dame Press.
- Bradley, J. (1968). Allied Intervention in Russia. New York: Basic Books.
- Brook-Shepherd, G. (1999). Iron Maze: The Western Secret Services and the Bolsheviks. London: Picador.
- Carley, M. J. (1976). The Politics of Anti-Bolshevism: The French Government and the Russo-Polish War, December 1919 to May 1920. The Historical Journal, 19(1), 163–189.
- ———. (1976). The Origins of the French Intervention in the Russian Civil War, January–May 1918: A Reappraisal. The Journal of Modern History, 48(3), 413–439.
- ———. (1980). Anti-Bolshevism in French Foreign Policy: The Crisis in Poland in 1920. The International History Review, 2(3), 410–431.
- ———. (1983). Revolution and Intervention: The French Government and the Russian Civil War, 1917–1919. Montreal: McGill-Queen's University Press.
- Debo, R. (1986). The Manuilskii Mission: An Early Soviet Effort to Negotiate with France, August 1918–April 1919. The International History Review, 8(2), 214–235.
- Dobson, C., & Miller, J. (1986). The Day We Almost Bombed Moscow: The Allied War in Russia 1918–1920. London: Hodder and Stoughton.
- Dunscomb, P. E. (2012). Japan's Siberian Intervention, 1918–1922: 'A Great Disobedience Against the People'. Lanham: Lexington Books.
- Isitt, B. (2011). From Victoria to Vladivostok: Canada's Siberian Expedition, 1917–19. Vancouver, BC: UBC Press.
- Kennan, G. F. (1961). Russia and the West Under Lenin and Stalin. Boston: Little Brown and Company.
- Kenez, P. (1971, 1977). Civil War in South Russia (2 vols.). Berkeley: University of California Press.
- Kettle, M. (1979/1988/1992). Russia and the Allies, 1917–1920. (3 vols.). Minneapolis, MN: University of Minnesota Press.
- Kinvig, C. (2006). Churchill's Crusade: The British Invasion of Russia, 1918–1920. London: Hambledon Continuum.
- Kirby, D. (1976). The Finnish Social Democratic Party and the Bolsheviks. Journal of Contemporary History, 11(2/3), 99–113.
- Saunders, D. (1988). Britain and the Ukrainian Question (1912–1920). The English Historical Review, 103(406), 40–68.
- Senn, A. E. (1971). The Russian Revolution in Switzerland, 19l4–19l7. Madison, WI: University of Wisconsin Press.
- Service, R. W. (2011). Spies and Commissars: Bolshevik Russia and the West. New York: Macmillan.
- Ullman, R. H. (1961/1968/1972). Anglo-Soviet Relations, 1917–1921, (3 vols.). Princeton: Princeton University Press.
- Wheeler-Bennett, J. D. (1934/2015). Brest-Litovsk: The Forgotten Peace, March 1918. New York: St. Martin's Press.
- White, S. (1979). Britain and the Bolshevik Revolution. London: Macmillan.

=== The United States ===
- Bacino, L. J. (1999). Reconstructing Russia: U.S. Policy in Revolutionary Russia, 1917–1922 Kent, OH: Kent State University Press.
- Dukes, P. (2012). The USA in the Making of the USSR: The Washington Conference, 1921–1922, and 'uninvited Russia'. London: Routledge.
- Fisher, H. H. (1927). The Famine in Soviet Russia, 1919–1923: The Operations of the American Relief Administration. New York: Macmillan.
- Foglesong, D. S. (1995). America's Secret War against Bolshevism: U.S. Intervention in the Russian Civil War, 1917–1920. Chapel Hill, NC: The University of North Carolina Press.
- ———. (1995). The United States, Self-determination and the Struggle Against Bolshevism in the Eastern Baltic Region, 1918–1920. Journal of Baltic Studies, 26(2), 107–144.
- Herman, A. L. (2017). 1917: Lenin, Wilson, and the Birth of the New World Disorder. New York: HarperCollins.
- House, J. M. (2016). Wolfhounds and Polar Bears: The American Expeditionary Force in Siberia, 1918–1920. Tuscaloosa": University of Alabama Press.
- Karolevitz, R. F. & Fenn, R. S. (1974). Flight of Eagles: The Story of the American Kościuszko Squadron in the Polish–Russian War 1919–1920. Sioux Falls, SD: Brevet Press.
- Kennan, G. F. (1956). Soviet–American Relations, 1917–1920 (2 Vols. Vol. 1:Russia Leaves the War Vol. 2: The Decision to Intervene). Princeton: Princeton University Press.
- Moore, J. R., Meade, Harry H., & Jahns, Lewis E. (2008). History of the American Expedition Fighting the Bolsheviks: Us Military Intervention in Soviet Russia 1918–1919. St Petersburg, FL: Red and Black Publishers.
- Nelson, J. C. (2019). The Polar Bear Expedition: The Heroes of America's Forgotten Invasion of Russia, 1918–1919. New York: William Morrow.
- Patenaude, B. M. (2002). The Big Show in Bololand: The American Relief Expedition to Soviet Russia in the Famine of 1921. Palo Alto: Stanford University Press.
- Richard, C. (1986). "The Shadow of a Plan": The Rationale Behind Wilson's 1918 Siberian Intervention. The Historian, 49(1), 64–84.
- Richard, C. J. (2012). When the United States Invaded Russia: Woodrow Wilson's Siberian Disaster. Landham: Rowman & Littlefield Publishers.
- Saul, N. E. (2001). War and Revolution: The United States and Russia, 1914–1921. Lawrence, KS: University Press of Kansas.
- ———. (2006). Friends or Foes?: The United States and Soviet Russia, 1921–1941. Lawrence, KS: University Press of Kansas.
- Shimkin, Michael. & Shimkin, Mary. (1985). From Golden Horn to Golden Gate: The Flight of the Siberian Russian Flotilla. Californian History, 64(4), 290–294.
- Smith, D. (2019). The Russian Job: The Forgotten Story of How America Saved the Soviet Union from Ruin. New York: Farrar, Straus and Giroux.
- Untergerger, B. (1987). Woodrow Wilson and the Bolsheviks: The "Acid Test" of Soviet–American Relations. Diplomatic History, 11(2), 71–90.
- Weissman, B. (1970). The Aftereffects of the American Relief Mission to Soviet Russia. The Russian Review, 29(4), 411–421.

== Biographies ==
=== Tsar Nicholas II ===
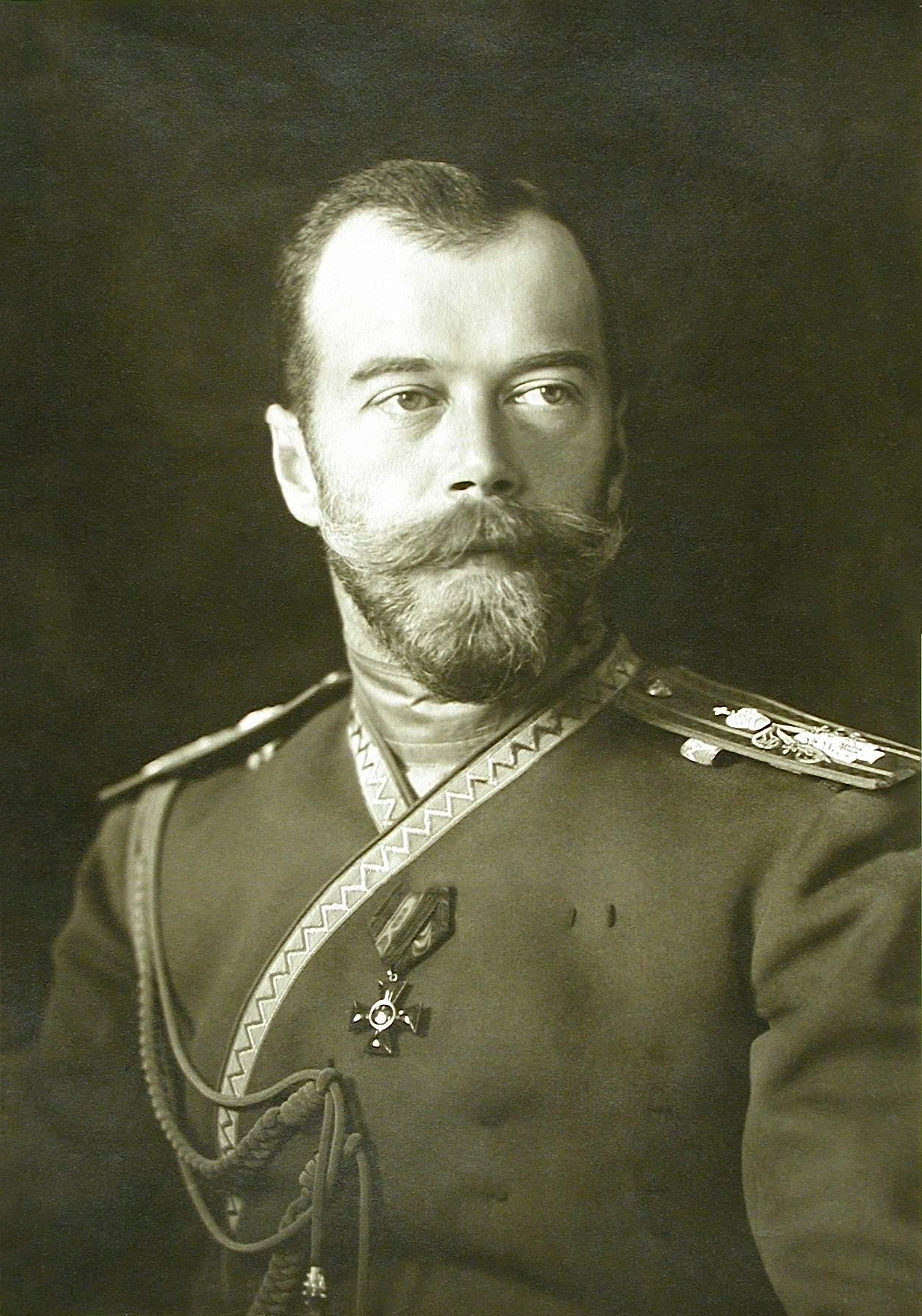
Nicholas II of Russia

- Frankland, N. (1961). Imperial Tragedy: Nicholas II, Last of the Tsars. New York: Coward-McCann.
- Ferro, M. (1995). Nicholas II: Last of the Tsars. New York: Oxford University Press.
- Lieven, D. (1993). Nicholas II: Emperor of all the Russias. London: John Murray Publishing.
- Massie, R. K. (2012). Nicholas and Alexandra: The Classic Account of the Fall of the Romanov Dynasty. New York: Modern Library.
- Maylunas, A., & Mironenko, S. (2000). Lifelong Passion: Nicholas and Alexandra: Their Own Story. New York: Doubleday.
- Montefiore, S. (2016). The Romanovs: 1613–1918. New York: Knopf.
- Perry, J. C. & Pleshakov, C. V. (1999). The Flight Of The Romanovs: A Family Saga. New York: Basic Books.
- Radzinsky, E. (1992). The Last Tsar: The Life And Death Of Nicholas II. New York: Doubleday.
- Rappaport, H. (2009). The Last Days of the Romanovs: Tragedy at Ekaterinburg. New York: St. Martin's Press.
- Service, R. W. (2017). The Last of the Tsars: Nicholas II and the Russian Revolution. New York: Pegasus Books.

=== Vladimir Lenin ===
This is a list of works about Vladimir Lenin. For a bibliography of works by Lenin, see Vladimir Lenin bibliography.

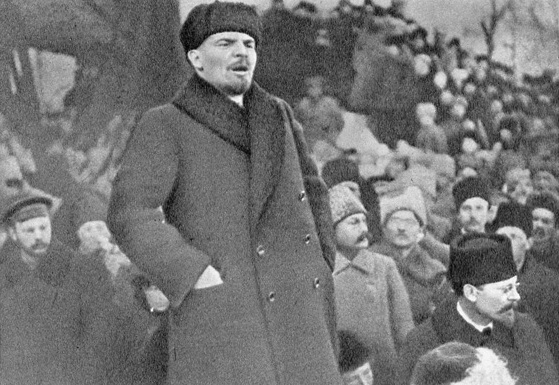
Lenin speaking in 1919

- Merridale, C. (2017). Lenin on the Train. New York: Penguin Books.
- Payne, R. (1964). The Life and Death of Lenin. New York: Simon and Schuster.
- Pipes, R. (1996). The Unknown Lenin: From the Secret Archive. New Haven, CT: Yale University Press.
- Rappaport, H. (2010). Conspirator: Lenin in Exile. New York: Basic Books.
- Read, C. (2005). Lenin: A Revolutionary Life. London: Routledge.
- Sebestyen, V. (2017). Lenin: The Man, the Dictator, and the Master of Terror. New York: Pantheon Books.
- Service, R. W. (2000). Lenin: A Biography. Cambridge: Belknap Press.
- Shukman, H. (1966). Lenin and the Russian Revolution. London: B.T. Batsford.
- Theen, R. (2004). Lenin: Genesis and Development of a Revolutionary. Princeton: Princeton University Press.
- Volkogonov, D. (1994). Lenin: Life and Legacy. London: HarperCollins.

=== Leon Trotsky ===
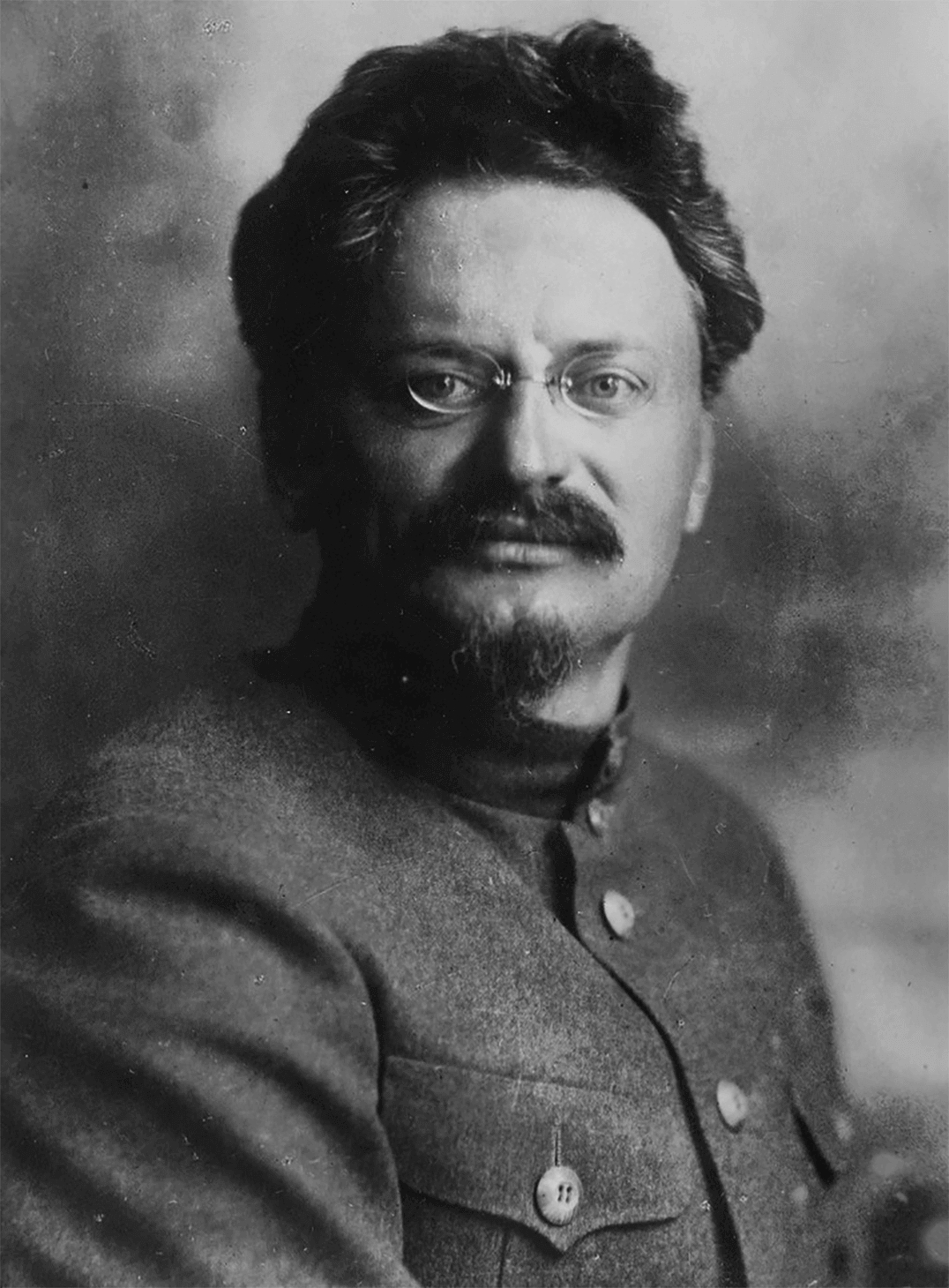
Leon Trotsky

This is a list of works about Leon Trotsky. For a bibliography of works by Trotsky, see Leon Trotsky bibliography.

- Beilharz, P. (1985). Trotsky as Historian. History Workshop, (20), 36–55.
- Cox, M. (1992). Trotsky and His Interpreters; or, Will the Real Leon Trotsky Please Stand up?. The Russian Review. 51(1), 84–102.
- Day, R. (2009). Leon Trotsky and the Politics of Economic Isolation (Cambridge Russian, Soviet and Post-Soviet Studies). Cambridge: Cambridge University Press.
- Deutscher, I. (2015). The Prophet: The Life of Leon Trotsky. New York: Verso. (Note: Originally published in three volumes by Oxford University Press (1954, 1959, 1963).)
- Heyman, N. (1976). Leon Trotsky's Military Education: From the Russo-Japanese War to 1917. The Journal of Modern History, 48(2), 71–98.
- Hoidal, O. (2013). Trotsky in Norway: Exile, 1935–1937 (NIU Series in Slavic, East European, and Eurasian Studies). DeKalb: Northern Illinois University Press.
- Rubenstein, J. (2011). Leon Trotsky: A Revolutionary's Life. New Haven, CT: Yale University Press.
- Service, R. W. (2009). Trotsky: A Biography. Cambridge: Belknap Press.
- Swain, G. (2014). Trotsky and the Russian Revolution. New York: Routledge.
- ———. (2016). Trotsky. New York: Routledge.
- Thatcher, I. D. (2003). Trotsky. New York: Routledge.
- Volkogonov, D. (1996). Trotsky, the Eternal Revolutionary. New York: Free Press.

=== Joseph Stalin ===
Works included here have a focus or significant material on Stalin during the revolutionary period. See main article for more works.

- Kotkin, S. (2014). Stalin: Volume I: Paradoxes of Power, 1878–1928. New York: Penguin Press.
- Montefiore, S. (2007). Young Stalin. New York: Knopf.
- Service, R. W. (2005). Stalin: A Biography. Cambridge: Belknap Press.
- Suny, R. G. (2020). Stalin: Passage to Revolution. Princeton: Princeton University Press.

=== Other Biographies ===
- Abraham, R. (1987). Alexander Kerensky: The First Love of the Revolution. New York: Columbia University Press.
- Cohen, S. F. (1980). Bukharin and the Bolshevik Revolution: A Political Biography, 1888–1938. New York: Oxford University Press.
- Fuhrmann, J. T. (2012). Rasputin: The Untold Story. Hoboken: Wiley Press.
- Haupt G. & Marie, J. (1974). Makers of the Russian Revolution. Biographies of Bolshevik Leaders. Ithaca: Cornell University Press.
- Getzler, I. (1967). Martov: Political Biography: A Political Biography of a Russian Social Democrat. Cambridge: Cambridge University Press.
- Kröner, A. W. (2010). The White Knight of the Black Sea: The Life of General Peter Wrangel. The Hague: Leuxenhoff. (Note: See Pyotr Wrangel.)
- McNeal, R. H. (1972). Bride of the Revolution: Krupskaya and Lenin. Ann Arbor, MI: University of Michigan Press.
- Smith, D. (2016). Rasputin: Faith, Power, and the Twilight of the Romanovs. New York: Farrar, Straus and Giroux.

== Historiography ==
- Abramson, Henry. (1990). Historiography on the Jews and the Ukrainian Revolution. Journal of Ukrainian Studies, 15(2), 33–46.
- Azovtsev, N. N. and Naumov, V. P. (1972/2014). Study of the History of the Military Intervention and Civil War in the USSR. Soviet Studies in History, 10(4), 327–360.
- Acton, E., Cherniaev, V., & Rosenberg, W. (Eds.). (1997). Critical Companion to the Russian Revolution 1914–1921. London: Bloomsbury Academic.
- Bachman, J. (1970). Recent Soviet Historiography of Russian Revolutionary Populism. Slavic Review, 29(4), 599–612.
- Beilharz, P. (1985). Trotsky as Historian. History Workshop, (20), 36–55.
- Bradley, J. (2017) The February Revolution. Russian Studies in History, 56(1), 1–5.
- Budnitskii, Oleg. (2001). Jews, Pogroms, and the White Movement: A Historiographical Critique. Kritika: Explorations in Russian and Eurasian History, 2(4), 1–23.
- Confino, M. (2009). The New Russian Historiography, and the Old—Some Considerations. History and Memory, 21(2), 7–33.
- Frankel, E. R., Frankel, J., & Knei-Paz, B. (Eds.). (1992). Revolution in Russia: Reassessments of 1917. Cambridge: Cambridge University Press.
- Gilbert, G. (2020). "New" Histories of the Russian Revolution?. Kritika: Explorations in Russian and Eurasian History. 21(1), 159–172.
- Graziosi, A. (2019). A Century of 1917s: Ideas, Representations, and Interpretations of the October Revolution, 1917–2017. Harvard Ukrainian Studies, 36(1/2), 9–44.
- Holmes, L. E. (2021). Revising the Revolution: The Unmaking of Russia's Official History of 1917'. Bloomington: Indiana University Press.
- Kolonitskii, B., & Cohen, Y. (2009). Russian Historiography of the 1917 Revolution: New Challenges to Old Paradigms?. History and Memory, 21(2), 34–59.
- Kolonitsky, B. (2019). Historians and the Centennial of the Russian Revolution In Russian Studies in History, 58(1), 44–53.
- McCann, J. M. (1984). Beyond the Bug: Soviet Historiography of the Soviet-Polish War of 1920. Soviet Studies, 36(4), 475–493.
- Meyer, A. (1986). Coming to Terms with the Past... and with One's Older Colleagues. The Russian Review, 45(4), 401–408.
- Pethybridge, R. (1970). The 1917 Petrograd Soviet and the Centralist Issue. Government and Opposition 5(3), 327–344.
- Petrov, Y. (2019). Russia on the Eve of the Great Revolution of 1917: Recent Trends in Historiography. Russian Studies in History, 58(1), 10–28.
- Read, C. (2002). In Search of Liberal Tsarism: The Historiography of Autocratic Decline. The Historical Journal, 45(1), 195–210.
- Service, R. W. (2009). The Russian Revolution, 1900-1927. London: Palgrave.
- Shelokhaev, V. & Solovyov, K. (2019). February in the Shadow of October: Historiography and Tasks Awaiting Further Research. Russian Studies in History, 58(1), 29–43.
- Smith, S. A. (1994). The Historiography of the Russian Revolution 100 Years On. Kritika: Explorations in Russian and Eurasian History, 16(4), 733–749.
- Smith, Steve. (1994). Writing the History of the Russian Revolution after the Fall of Communism. Europe-Asia Studies, 46(4), 563–578.
- Suny, R. G. (1983). Toward a Social History of the October Revolution. The American Historical Review, 88(1), 31–52.
- ———. (1994). Revision and Retreat in the Historiography of 1917: Social History and Its Critics. The Russian Review, 53(2), 165–182.
- ———. (2017). Red Flag Unfurled: History, Historians, and the Russian Revolution. New York: Verso.
- Uldricks, T. (1975). Petrograd Revisited: New Views of the Russian Revolution. The History Teacher, 8(4), 611–623.
- Wade, R. A. (2004). Revolutionary Russia: New Approaches to the Russian Revolution of 1917. New York: Routledge.
- ———. (2008). The Revolution at Ninety-One: Anglo-American Historiography of the Russian Revolution of 1917. Journal of Modern Russian History and Historiography, 1(1), 1–42.
- Warth, R. (1967). On the Historiography of the Russian Revolution. Slavic Review, 26(2), 247–264.
- White, J. D., & Thatcher, I. D. (Eds.). (2006). Reinterpreting Revolutionary Russia: Essays in Honour of James D. White. New York: Palgrave Macmillan.

=== Memory studies ===
- Corney, F.C. (2020). Revolution and Memory. In A Companion to the Russian Revolution, D. Orlovsky (Ed.). Hoboken: John Wiley & Sons Ltd.
- Laruelle, M., & Karnysheva, M. (2020). Memory Politics and the Russian Civil War: Reds versus Whites. London: Bloomsbury.

== Reference works ==
- The Cambridge Encyclopedia of Russia and the former Soviet Union. (1994). Cambridge: Cambridge University Press.
- Jackson, G. D., & Devlin, R. J. (1989). Dictionary of the Russian Revolution. New York: Greenwood.
- Kasack, W. & Atack, R. (1988). Dictionary of Russian literature since 1917. New York: Columbia University Press.
- Minahan, J. (2012). The Former Soviet Union's Diverse Peoples: A Reference Sourcebook. Santa Barbara: ABC-CLIO.
- Orlovsky, D. (2020). A Companion to the Russian Revolution. Hoboken: John Wiley & Sons.
- Pushkarev, S. G., Fisher, R. T., & Vernadsky, G. (1970). Dictionary of Russian Historical Terms from the Eleventh Century to 1917. New Haven, CT: Yale University Press.
- Shukman, H. (1988). The Blackwell Encyclopedia of the Russian Revolution. Cambridge: Blackwell Publishers.
- Smele, J. D. (2015). Historical Dictionary of the Russian Civil Wars, 1916–1926 (2 vols.). Lanham: Rowman & Littlefield Publishers.
- Smith, S. A. (2014). The Oxford Handbook of the History of Communism. New York: Oxford University Press.
- Vronskaya, J. & Čuguev, V. (1992). The Biographical Dictionary of the Former Soviet Union: Prominent people in all fields from 1917 to the present. London: Bowker-Saur.
- Nathan Smith (April 1, 1985). "Political Freemasonry in Russia, 1906–1918: A Discussion of the Sources". The Russian Review. 44 (2): 157–173. doi:10.2307/129171. JSTOR 129171.

== Other studies ==
- Aronova, E. (2021). Scientific History: Experiments in History and Politics from the Bolshevik Revolution to the End of the Cold War'. Chicago: University of Chicago Press.
- Ascher, A.. (2001). P. A. Stolypin: The Search for Stability in Late Imperial Russia. Palo Alto: Stanford University Press.
- Avrich, P. (1967). Russian Anarchists. Princeton: Princeton University Press.
- Baron, N. & Gatrell, P. (2004). Homelands: War, Population and Statehood in Eastern Europe and Russia, 1918–1924. London: Anthem Press.
- Biggart, J. (1972). Kirov before the Revolution. Soviet Studies, 23(3), 345–372.
- Chamberlain, L. (2007). The Philosophy Steamer: Lenin and the Exile of the Intelligentsia. London: Atlantic.
- David-Fox, M., Holquist, P., & Martin, A. M. (2012). Fascination and Enmity: Russia and Germany as entangled histories, 1914–1945. Pittsburgh, PA: University of Pittsburgh Press.
- Edmondson, C. (1981). An Inquiry into the Termination of Soviet Famine Relief Programmes and the Renewal of Grain Export, 1922–23. Soviet Studies, 33(3), 370–385.
- Figes, O. & Kolonitskii, B. (1999). Interpreting the Russian Revolution: The Language and Symbols of 1917. New Haven, CT: Yale University Press.
- Finkel, S. (2007). On the Ideological Front: The Russian Intelligentsia and the Making of the Soviet Public Sphere. New Haven, CT: Yale University Press.
- Frame, M. (2013). Crime, Society and 'Revolutionary Conscience' during the Russian Civil War: Evidence from the Militia Files. Crime, Histoire & Sociétés / Crime, History & Societies. 17(1), 129–150.
- Getzler, I. (2014). Nikolai Sukhanov: Chronicler of the Russian Revolution. New York: Palgrave Macmillan. (Note: See Nikolai Sukhanov.)
- Gleason, W. E. (1983). Alexander Guchkov and the End of the Russian Empire. Philadelphia, PA: American Philosophical Society. (Note: See Alexander Guchkov.)
- Gregory, P. R. (2017). The Black Swan of the Russian Revolution. The Independent Review, 22(2), 167–171.
- Hartley, J. M. (2021). Chapter 13:The Volga in War, Revolution and Civil War. In The Volga: A History. New Haven: Yale University Press.
- Hasegawa, T. (2017). Crime and Punishment in the Russian Revolution: Mob Justice and Police in Petrograd. Cambridge: Harvard University Press.
- Holquist, P. (2002). Making War, Forging Revolution: Russia's Continuum of Crisis, 1914–1921. Cambridge: Harvard University Press.
- Hosking, G. (1973). The Russian Constitutional Experiment: Government and Duma, 1907–1914. Cambridge: Cambridge University Press.
- Ings, S. (2017). Stalin and the Scientists: A History of Triumph and Tragedy, 1905–1953. New York: Atlantic Monthly Press.
- Josephson, P. (1988). Science Policy in the Soviet Union, 1917–1927. Minerva, 26(3), 342–369.
- Linkhoeva, T. (2020). Revolution Goes East: Imperial Japan and Soviet Communism (Studies of the Weatherhead East Asian Institute). Ithaca: Cornell University Press.
- Lowe, K. (2014). Humanitarianism and National Sovereignty: Red Cross Intervention on behalf of Political Prisoners in Soviet Russia, 1921–3. Journal of Contemporary History, 49(4), 652–674.
- Lyandres, S. (1995). The Bolsheviks' "German Gold" Revisited: An inquiry into the 1917 accusations. Pittsburgh, PA: University of Pittsburgh Press. (Note: Contains text of telegrams in Russian with English translation.)
- Main, S. (1995). The Creation and Development of the Library System in the Red Army during the Russian Civil War (1918–1920): A Historical Introduction. The Library Quarterly: Information, Community, Policy, 65(3), 319–332.
- McKean, R. B. (1998). Between the Revolutions: Russia 1905 to 1917. Shaftesbury, UK: Historical Association.
- McMeekin, S. (2009). History's Greatest Heist: The looting of Russia by the Bolsheviks. New Haven, CT: Yale University Press.
- McNeal, R. H. (1959). Lenin's Attack on Stalin: Review and Reappraisal. American Slavic and East European Review, 18(3), 295–314.
- Middleton, J. (1962). "Bolshevism in Art": Dada and Politics. Texas Studies in Literature and Language, 4(3), 408–430.
- Mosse, W. E. (1965). Stolypin's Villages. The Slavonic and East European Review, 43(101), 257–274.
- Nation, R. C. (2009). War on War: Lenin, the Zimmerwald Left, and the Origins of Communist Internationalism. Chicago: Haymarket Books.
- Nicolaevsky, B. I., Rabinowich, A., Rabinowitch, J., & Kristof, L. K. D. (1973). Revolution and Politics in Russia: Essays in Memory of B.I. Nicolaevsky. Bloomington: Indiana University Press.
- Pearson, M. (1975). The Sealed Train. New York: Macmillan.
- Pethybridge, R. (1967). The Significance of Communications in 1917. Soviet Studies, 19(1), 109–114.
- Riha, T. (1967). 1917. A Year of Illusions. Soviet Studies, 19(1), 115–121.
- Raeff, R. (1990). Russia Abroad: A Cultural History of the Russian Emigration, 1919–1939. New York: Oxford University Press.
- Russell, R. (1990). The Arts and the Russian Civil War. Journal of European Studies, 20(3), 219–240.
- Scharlau, W. B. & Zeman, Z. A. B. (1900). The Merchant of Revolution; The Life of Alexander Israel Helphand (Parvus) 1867–1924. London: Oxford University Press.
- Service, R. W. (1977). The Bolshevik Party in Revolution, 1917–1923: A Study in Organizational Change, 1917–1923. New York: MacMillan.
- Slusser, R. (1987). Stalin in October. The Man Who Missed the Revolution. Baltimore: Johns Hopkins University Press.
- Strakhovsky, L. (1959). The Statesmanship of Peter Stolypin: A Reappraisal. The Slavonic and East European Review, 37(89), 348–370.
- Waldron, P. (1997). Between Two Revolutions: Stolypin and the Politics of Renewal in Russia. DeKalb: Northern Illinois University Press.
- Williams, R. C. (1986). The Other Bolsheviks: Lenin and His Critics, 1904–1914. Bloomington: Indiana University Press.

== English language translations of primary sources ==
=== Vladimir Lenin ===
Collected Works

- Essential Works of Lenin. New York: Bantam Books. (1966).
- Collected Works (45 vols.). (1977). Moscow: Progress Publishers.

Major individual works related to the Revolution and Civil War

- What Is to Be Done?: Burning Questions of our Movement. (1902). Text
- The Right of Nations to Self-Determination. (1914). Text.
- Socialism and War: The Attitude of the Russian Social-Democratic Labour Party Towards the War. (1915). Text
- Imperialism, the Highest Stage of Capitalism. (1916). Text.
- The Tasks of the Proletariat in the Present Revolution (April Thesis). (1917). Text.
- The Seventh All-Russia Conference of the Russian Social Democratic Labour Party (Bolsheviks). (1917). Text. (Note: see Russian Social Democratic Labour Party)
- Lessons of the Revolution. (1917). Text.
- The Impending Catastrophe and How to Combat It. (1917). Text.
- The State and Revolution. (1917). Text.
- The Crisis Has Matured. (1917). Text.
- Second All Russia Congress of Soviets of Workers' and Soldiers' Deputies. (1917). Text. (Note: see Second All-Russian Congress of Workers' and Soldiers' Deputies' Soviets)
- To the Citizens of Russia! (1917). Text. (Note: Declaration of the seizure of power during the Second All-Russian Congress of Soviets of Workers' and Soldiers' Deputies.)
- Decree on Peace (1917). Text.
- Decree on Land (1917). Text.
- Seventh Congress of the Russian Communist Party (Bolsheviks). (1918). Text. (Note: see 7th Congress of the Russian Communist Party (Bolsheviks))
- Fourth All-Russia Congress Of Soviets. (1918). Text. (Note: see All-Russian Congress of Soviets)
- The Immediate Tasks of the Soviet Government. (1918). Text.
- "Left-Wing" Childishness and the Petty-Bourgeois Mentality. (1918). Text.
- Theses On The Present Political Situation. (1918). Text.
- The Proletarian Revolution and the Renegade Kautsky. (1918). Text.
- Eighth Congress of the Russian Communist Party (Bolsheviks) (1919). Text. (Note: see 8th Congress of the Russian Communist Party (Bolsheviks))
- "Left-Wing" Communism: An Infantile Disorder. (1920). Text.
- On The Kronstadt Revolt. (1921). Text
- Tenth Congress of the Russian Communist Party (Bolsheviks) (1921). Text. (Note: see 10th Congress of the Russian Communist Party (Bolsheviks))
- Eleventh Congress Of The Russian Communist Party (Bolsheviks) (1922). Text. (Note: see 11th Congress of the Russian Communist Party (Bolsheviks))
- Lenin's Testament. (1923). Text.

Archives

- The Collected Works of Vladimir Lenin.

=== Leon Trotsky ===
Collected works

- Official Government Documents from the People's Commissar for Foreign Affairs. (1918). Text
- Trotsky's Military Writings. (1918–1923). Vol. 1 Text (1918), Vol. 2 Text (1919), Vol. 3 Text (1920), Vol. 4 Text (1921–1923).
- Howe, Irving (editor). The Basic Writings of Trotsky. New York: Schocken Books. (1976).

Major Individual Works related to the Revolution and Civil War

- Results and Prospects. (1906), Text
- The Year 1905. (1907). Text
- The War and the International (The Bolsheviks and World Peace). (1914). Text
- Terrorism and Communism: An Answer to Karl Kautsky. (1920). Text
- Between Red and White. A Study of Some Fundamental Questions of Revolution, With Particular Reference to Georgia. (1922). Text
- The New Course. (1923). Text
- Lessons of October (1924). Text
- History of the Russian Revolution. (1930). Text (Note: Original work translated into English by Max Eastman and published by Simon and Schuster in 1932.)

Archives

- Works by Leon Trotsky at Project Gutenberg
- Trotsky Internet Archive.

=== Other works ===
Collected works

- Akhapkin, Y. (Ed.). (1970). First Decrees of Soviet Power. London: Lawrence and Wishart.
- Brovkin, V. N. (Ed.). (1991). Dear Comrades: Menshevik Reports on the Bolshevik Revolution and the Civil War. Palo Alto: Hoover Institution Press.
- Browder, R. P. & Kerensky, A. F. (Eds.). (1961). The Russian Provisional Government 1917: Documents. (3 vols.). Palo Alto: Stanford University Press.
- Bunyan, J. & Fisher, H. H. (Eds.). (1934) Bolshevik Revolution 1917–1918 – Documents and Materials. Palo Alto: Stanford University Press.
- ———. (1976). Intervention, Civil War, and Communism in Russia, April–December, 1918: Documents and Materials. New York: Octagon Books.
- ———. (2019). Origin of Forced Labor in the Soviet State, 1917–1921: Documents and Materials. Baltimore: Johns Hopkins University Press.
- Butt, V. P., Swain, G., Murphy, A. B., & Myshov, N. A. (Eds.). (1996). The Russian Civil War: Documents from the Soviet Archives. London: Palgrave Macmillan UK.
- Daly, J. W., Trofimov, L. (2009). Russia in War and Revolution, 1914–1922: A Documentary History. Indianapolis: Hackett Publishing Company.
- Daniels, R. V. (Ed.). (2001). A Documentary History of Communism in Russia: From Lenin to Gorbachev (3rd Edition). Hanover, NH: University Press of New England.
- Degras, J. (1978). Soviet Documents on Foreign Policy: 1933–1941. (3 vols.). New York: Octagon Books.
- Elwood, R. C., Gregor, R., Hodnett, G., Schwartz, D. V., & McNeal, R. H. (1974). Resolutions and Decisions of the Communist Party of the Soviet Union: The Russian Social Democratic Labour Party: 1898–October 1917. Toronto: University of Toronto Press.
- Gregor, R. (1974). Resolutions and Decisions of the Communist Party of the Soviet Union: Vol. 2, The Early Soviet Period, 1917–1929. Toronto: University of Toronto Press.
- McCauley, M. (1996). The Russian revolution and the Soviet state 1917–1921: Documents. New York: Macmillan.
- Storella, C. J., Sokolov, A. K. (2013). The Voice of the People: Letters from the Soviet Village, 1918–1932. New Haven, CT: Yale University Press.
- Szczesniak, B. (1959). The Russian Revolution and Religion: A Collection of Documents Concerning the Suppression of Religion by the Communists, 1917–1925. Notre Dame: University of Notre Dame Press.
- Varneck, E. & Fisher, H. H. (1935). The Testimony of Kolchak and Other Siberian Materials. Palo Alto: Stanford University Press.

Individual works related to the Revolution and Civil War

- The Manifesto on the Improvement of the State Order (October Manifesto) (1905). Text
- The Russian Constitution of 1906. (1906). Text
- Anderson, G. J. (2010). A Michigan Polar Bear Confronts the Bolsheviks: A War Memoir. (G. Olsen, Ed.). Grand Rapids: Eerdmans.
- Babel, I. (1995). 1920 Diary. New Haven, CT: Yale University Press.
- Gapon, G. (1906). The Story of My Life. Text
- Gilliard, P. (1921). 'Thirteen Years at the Russian Court: A Personal Record of the Last Years and Death of the Tsar Nicholas II, and His Family.' Text
- Gorky, M. (1918). Untimely Thoughts: Essays on Revolution, Culture, and the Bolsheviks. Text
- Heifetz, E. (1921). The Slaughter of the Jews in the Ukraine in 1919. Text
- Kerensky, A. F. (1927). The Catastrophe. Text
- Kautsky, K. (1919). The Dictatorship of the Proletariat. Text.
- ———. (1920). Terrorism and Communism: A Contribution to the Natural History of Revolution. Text.
- Krupskaya, Nadezhda. (1930). The October Days. Reminiscences of Lenin. Text.
- Luxemburg, R. (1906). The Mass Strike, the Political Party and the Trade Unions. Text (Note: Original work published in English in 1925 by the Marxist Educational Society of Detroit)
- Mstislavskiĭ, S. D. (1989). Five days which transformed Russia. Bloomington: Indiana University Press.
- Radek, K. (1922). The Paths of the Russian Revolution. Text.
- Reed, J. (1919). Ten Days That Shook the World. Text. (Note: Original work published in English by Boni & Liveright in 1919; second edition published in 1922 contains an introduction by Vladimir Lenin.)
- de Robien, Louis (1969). The Diary of a Diplomat in Russia, 1917-1918; translated from the French. London: Michael Joseph.
- Romanov, N. (1966). Diary of Nicholas II, 1917–1918, an annotated translation. (Translation by K. de Price). The University of Montana
- ———. (1917). The Letter of Abdication of Nicholas II. Text. Brigham Young University.
- Sukhanovthe, N. N. (1921). The Memoirs of N. N. Sukhanov, The Russian Revolution 1917, (7 vols). (Note: English Translation by Joel Carmichael for Princeton University Press, 1984.) (Note: see Nikolai Sukhanov)
- Tseretelli, I. (1955–56). Reminiscences of the February Revolution: The April Crisis. (Note: An excerpt from Tseretelli's unpublished memoir.) The Russian Review,

Part 1: 14(2), 93–108.
Part 2: 14(3), 184–200.
Part 3: 14(4), 301–321.
Part 4: 15(1), 37–48.

- Wrangel, P. N. (1957). Always With Honour: Memoirs of General Wrangel. New York: Robert Speller & Sons. Text. (Note: Originally published: Berlin, 1928 in Russian and German.)

Archives

- Archives of the Soviet Communist Party and Soviet State. Hoover Institution, Stanford University.
- Karl Kautsky Archive.
- Julius Martov Archive
- Georgi Plekhanov Archive.
- Grigory Zinoviev Archive. (Note: See Grigory Zinoviev)
- The October Revolution Archive

== See also ==
- List of states and regions involved in the Russian Civil War
- Outline of the Russian Revolution and Civil War
- Bibliography of Russian history
- Bibliography of Stalinism and the Soviet Union
- Bibliography of the Post Stalinist Soviet Union
- Bibliography of Ukrainian history
- Bibliography of the history of Belarus and Byelorussia
- Bibliography of the history of Poland
- Index of Old Bolsheviks
- Index of articles related to the Russian Revolution and Civil War
