= Donald Raleigh (historian) =

American scholar

Donald J. Raleigh is an American scholar specializing in twentieth-century Russian history. He is the Jay Richard Judson Distinguished Professor of History at the University of North Carolina at Chapel Hill. He completed a BA (1971) at Knox College, followed by an MA and a PhD at Indiana University Bloomington. He has written extensively on the Russian Revolution, on local history (including two books on the Saratov region), and on Soviet oral history. He edited the scholarly journal Soviet (Russian) Studies in History and the monograph series The New Russian History.

More recently, he has researched the life and times of Soviet leader Leonid Brezhnev. His 2011 book Soviet Baby Boomers: An Oral History of Russia’s Cold War Generation was nominated for the Pushkin House Book Award.

== Selected works ==
- Soviet Baby Boomers: An Oral History of Russia’s Cold War Generation (Oxford University Press, 2011)
- Russia’s Sputnik Generation: Soviet Baby Boomers Talk about Their Lives (Indiana University Press, 2006)
- Experiencing Russia’s Civil War: Politics, Society, and Revolutionary Culture in Saratov, 1917–1922 (Princeton University Press, 2002)
- Provincial Landscapes: Local Dimensions of Soviet Power (University of Pittsburgh Press, 2001)
- Revolution on the Volga: 1917 in Saratov (Cornell University Press, 1986)
