= Sergey Mstislavsky =

- Сергей Дмитриевич Мстиславский
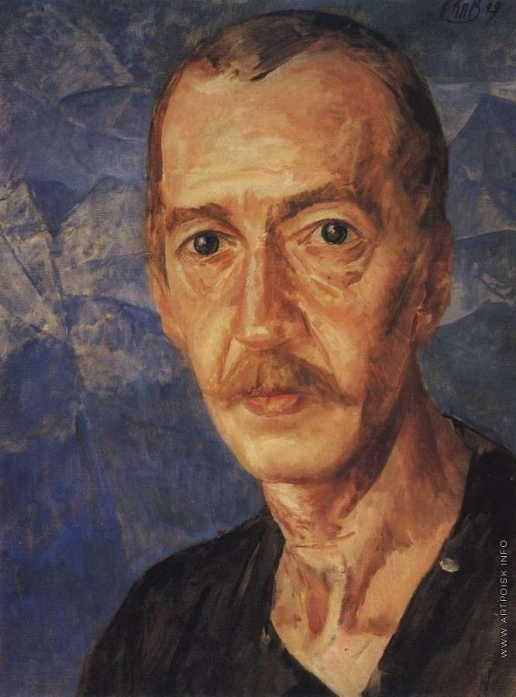
- Born: 4 November 1876; Moscow, Russian Empire
- Died: 22 April 1943 (aged 66); Irkutsk, USSR
- Writing career
- Genre: Novel

Sergey Dmitrievich Mstislavsky (Russian: Сергей Дмитриевич Мстиславский, born Maslovsky; November 4, 1876, Moscow — April 22, 1943, Irkutsk, USSR) was a Russian Soviet writer, dramatist, publicist, anthropologist, editor and political activist, close to the Left Socialist-Revolutionaries. In the 1920s and 1930 he authored numerous adventure novels, mostly about the events of the 1905 and 1917 Revolutions and the Russian Civil War (Built on Blood, 1927; The Heavy Cavalry Alliance, 1928; The Partions, 1932; The Eve. 1917, 1937).

== Biography ==
Sergey Maslovsky was born in Irkutsk, to a professor of the Russian military academy. He studied natural sciences in Saint Petersburg University which he graduated in 1901. While a student he took part in several expeditions to the Central Asia; as a result, the series of stories and sketches ("On the Margins", "In Samarkand", "Kop-Kara" and others) came out in 1900. In 1904 Mstislavsky joined the Left Socialist-Revolutionaries and took part in the 1905 Revolution. He became the Fighting Workers' Union chairman, then one of the leaders of the All-Russian Officers' Union. In 1910 he was imprisoned and spent a year in the Petropavloskaya Fortress. In the 1900s he published several books on anthropology and bibliography ("Galtcha", 1901; "The Bibliography of Afghanistan", with V.F.Goetse and B.P.Kareev; "The Military Press Archives", 1911).

Mstislavsky (now known under this pseudonym) took part in the February Revolution. In October 1917 he worked in Smolny, and was a member of the 2nd All-Russian Congress of the Soviets. As a commissar for the Petrograd Soviets he was in the team sent to arrest Nicolas II. After the murder of Ambassador Wilhelm von Mirbach he quit the Left SRs and joined the Ukrainian Borotbists Party, which he left in 1921.

After the end of the Russian Civil War Mstislavsky worked in publishing. He was one of the editors of The Great Soviet Encyclopedia (2nd edition). In 1925 Mstislavsky's first novel Roof of the World was published, based on his sketches and essays written in the 1900s and based on his Central Asian expeditions. Highly popular were his thrillers about the history of the Russian revolution: Built on Blood (1927), The Heavy Cavalry Alliance (1928), Self-less (1930), all featuring young men from noble families "looking for their place in the Revolution." Some critics praised the author's well-structured, intricate plotlines, others accused him of being perfunctory when portraying the real people or accounts of political events.

Among his later works were historical novels The Partions (1932, on Narodnaya Volya), Black Magoma (1932, building of Socialism in Avaria in the Caucasus), Rook is the Bird of Spring (1936, on Nikolay Bauman), The Eve. 1917 (1937, about the February revolution). His last novel, Forty Years On (the sequel to The Roof of the World) remained unfinished. Mstislavsky, who in Maxim Gorky Literature Institute was the head of the Prose department, also wrote plays, among them Built on Blood (produced by Vakhtangov Theatre, 1928), Stormy Petrel (Baku Workers' Theatre, 1930) and The Rook is a Spring Bird (Central Children’s Theatre, 1945),

== Selected bibliography ==
- Roof of the World (Krysha mira, 1925, novel)
- Built on Blood (Na krovi, 1927, novel)
- "The Death of Tsarism" (Gibel Tsarizma, 1927, historical essay)
- The Heavy Cavalry Alliance (Soyuz tyazhyoloi artillerii, 1928, novel)
- Self-less (Bez sebya, 1930, novel)
- The Partions (Partiontsy, 1932, short novel)
- Colonel Platov Telling True Stories About His Friends and Even Relatives (1935, collection)
- The Rook is a Bird of Spring (1936, novel)
- The Eve. 1917 (Nakanune. 1917, 1937, novel)
