= Alexander Rabinowitch =

American scholar of Russian studies (1934–2026)

Alexander E. Rabinowitch
- Born: August 30, 1934; London, England
- Died: June 16, 2026 (aged 91); Carmel, Indiana, U.S.
- Occupation: Historian
- Spouse: Janet Bernstein (m. 1962)

Academic background
- Education: Knox College (BA); University of Chicago (MA); Indiana University Bloomington (PhD)

Academic work
- Notable works: The Bolsheviks Come to Power (1976)

Alexander E. Rabinowitch (August 30, 1934 – June 16, 2026) was an American historian who was Professor Emeritus of History at the Indiana University Bloomington, where he taught from 1968 until 1999, and Affiliated Research Scholar at the St. Petersburg Institute of History, Russian Academy of Sciences, since 2013. Rabinowitch was recognized as a leading expert on the Bolsheviks, the Russian Revolution of 1917, and the Russian Civil War.

== Early life ==
Rabinowitch and his brother Victor were born in London in 1934 to Russian actress Anya Rabinowitch and her husband, scientist and author Eugene Rabinowitch. The family emigrated to the United States in 1938, when Eugene took a position at MIT.

He received his B.A. at Knox College, 1956; M.A. at the University of Chicago, 1961; and Ph.D. at Indiana University Bloomington, 1965.

== Career ==
Upon publication, Rabinowitch's best-known book, The Bolsheviks Come to Power: The Revolution of 1917 in Petrograd (1976), was acclaimed by Western scholars as a major breakthrough in study of the Russian Revolution. Initially, it was fiercely attacked by Soviet historians for its violation of mandatory canon. In 1989, during Gorbachev's perestroika, it became the first Western scholarly investigation of the Russian revolution to be published in the Soviet Union. Based on wide-ranging empirical research, the book stresses broad popular support for the Bolshevik program calling for peace, land, bread, and transfer of power to the soviets, as well as the party's tolerance of diverse views and its decentralized organizational structure in explaining its successful accession to power in October. Scholars in other disciplines took notice. According to Victoria Bunnell in the American Journal of Sociology, "the sociologist whose interest lie in the fields of revolution, social movements, and labor policy will find...[it] highly valuable." According to Paul M. Johnson in The American Political Science Review, the book represents, "important new contributions to the literature....Solidly grounded in the traditional historiography...[making] judicious use of the valuable materials that became accessible during the Khrushchev era."

In 2007, following decades of archival research and writing, Rabinowitch published The Bolsheviks in Power: The First Year of Soviet Rule in Petrograd. This study was praised by Western and Russian reviewers. Rabinowitch set for himself the twin goals of explaining how the Bolshevik party was relatively quickly "transformed into one of the most highly centralized authoritarian political organizations in modern history" and the rapidity with which the grass-roots egalitarian ideals that contributed immeasurably to its effectiveness in the struggle for power in 1917 Russia were subverted.

From 1975 to 1984 Rabinowitch was Director of the Russian and East European Institute, Indiana University. From 1986 to 1993 he was Dean for International Programs at Indiana University. A Festschrift honoring Rabinowitch, prepared by his former graduate students, appeared in 2012 (Michael S. Melancon and Donald J. Raleigh, eds., Russia's Century of Revolutions: Parties, People, Places, Studies Presented in Honor of Alexander Rabinowitch). Rabinowitch has received grants and fellowships from the National Endowment for the Humanities, American Council of Learned Societies, Fulbright-Hays, IREX, Guggenheim Foundation, John D. and Catherine T. MacArthur Foundation, and Andrew W. Mellon Foundation. He has been a Senior Fellow of the Harriman Institute, Columbia University; the Institute for Advanced Study, Princeton; and the Hoover Institution, Stanford, and was elected a member of the Council on Foreign Relations.

== Death ==
Rabinowitch died on June 16, 2026, at the age of 91.

== Selected publications ==
- Prelude to Revolution The Petrograd Bolsheviks and the July 1917 Uprising by Alexander Rabinowitch and 6 Illustrations 1 Map (Hardcover - 1968)
- The Soviet Union Since Stalin by Stephen F. Cohen and Alexander Rabinowitch and Robert Sharlet (Paperback - 1980)
- Prelude to Revolution (A Midland Book, Mb 661) by Alexander Rabinowitch (Paperback - August 1, 1991)
- Russia in the Era of NEP (Indiana-Michigan Series in Russian and Eastern European Studies) by Sheila Fitzpatrick, Alexander Rabinowitch, and Richard Stites (Paperback - September 1, 1991)
- Politics and society in Petrograd, 1917-1920: The bolsheviks, the lower classes, and Soviet power, Petrograd, February 1917 - July 1918 by Alexander Rabinowitch (Unknown Binding - 1993)
- The Bolsheviks Come To Power: The Revolution of 1917 in Petrograd by Alexander Rabinowitch (Hardcover - June 1, 2004)
- The Bolsheviks in Power: The First Year of Soviet Rule in Petrograd by Alexander Rabinowitch (Hardcover - September 30, 2007)
- The Bolsheviks Survive: Petrograd 1919. University of Pittsburgh Press (2026).
