= W. Bruce Lincoln =

American historian (1938–2000)

William Bruce Lincoln
- Born: September 6, 1938; Suffield, Connecticut, U.S.
- Died: April 9, 2000 (aged 61); DeKalb, Illinois, U.S.
- Education: College of William and Mary; University of Chicago
- Occupations: Professor; writer
- Writing career
- Subject: Russian history
- Notable work: Red Victory: A History of the Russian Civil War
- Notable awards: Guggenheim Fellowship (1982)

William Bruce Lincoln (September 6, 1938 – April 9, 2000) was an American scholar and author who wrote a number of widely-read books on Russian history. An expert noted for his narrative skills, he explained that he began "to write for a broader audience in the hope that my efforts to explain Russia's past may enable readers to better understand Russia's present.".

== Early life ==
William Bruce Lincoln, son of Charles A. and Ruth Lincoln, grew up was in Suffield, Connecticut. He had a brother named Charles. He received his A.B. degree from the College of William and Mary in 1960 and a Ph.D. in Russian history from the University of Chicago in 1966.

== Career ==
In 1967 Lincoln joined the faculty of Northern Illinois University, where he taught Russian history until his retirement as Distinguished Research Professor at age 59. During his career at NIU he authored 12 books, several of which became featured book club adoptions and were translated into various foreign languages. He received many research grants and awards, including a Guggenheim Fellowship in 1982. He published more than 50 articles and reviews, and some of his books written for general readers sold more than 100,000 copies. At the time of his death, he was writing a general history of Russia.

== Books ==
- Nikolai Miliutin: An Enlightened Russian Bureaucrat (Oriental Research Partners, 1977) ISBN 0-89250-133-2
- Nicholas I: Emperor and Autocrat of All the Russias (Allen Lane Penguin, 1978) ISBN 0-7139-0837-8, German edition, 1981; Polish edition, 1988.
- Petr Petrovich Semenov-Tian-Shanskii: The Life of a Russian Geographer (Oriental Research Partners, 1980) ISBN 0-89250-139-1
- The Romanovs: Autocrats of All the Russias (Dial Press-Doubleday, 1981) ISBN 0-385-27187-5, Spanish edition, 1984; Chinese edition, forthcoming.
- In the Vanguard of Reform: Russia's Enlightened Bureaucrats (Northern Illinois University Press, 1982) ISBN 0-87580-084-X, Italian edition, 1993.
- In War's Dark Shadow: The Russians Before the Great War (Dial Press-Doubleday, 1983) ISBN 0-385-27409-2
- Passage Through Armageddon: The Russians in War and Revolution (Simon and Schuster, 1986) ISBN 0-671-55709-2
- Red Victory: A History of the Russian Civil War (Simon and Schuster, 1989) ISBN 0-671-63166-7, Italian edition, 1991.
- The Great Reforms: Autocracy, Bureaucracy, and the Politics of Change in Imperial Russia (Northern Illinois University Press, 1990) ISBN 0-87580-155-2, Italian edition, 1993.
- The Conquest of a Continent: Siberia and the Russians (Random House, 1994) ISBN 0-679-41214-X, German edition, 1996.
- Between Heaven and Hell: The Story of A Thousand Years of Artistic Life in Russia (Viking Press, 1998) ISBN 0-670-87568-6
- Sunlight at Midnight: St. Petersburg and the Rise of Modern Russia (published posthumously, Basic Books, 2001) ISBN 978-0-465-08323-7

Lincoln's The Conquest of a Continent: Siberia and the Russians was named "one of that magazine's best books of 1994" by Publishers Weekly. Fernanda Eberstadt of The Washington Post summarized the book Passage Through Armageddon, "[it is] an accessible, comprehensive and eminently balanced history". Post writer Jane Good summarized of the book Red Victory: A History of the Russian Civil War, "Covering all three topics in a single study of moderate length unfortunately results in a text that presumes more knowledge of Russian history than is typical of the general reader, yet glosses over details that would be of interest to the specialist. Nevertheless, Red Victory is worth reading by anyone willing to invest time and effort to better understand the Soviet Union" John A. C. Greppin of The New York Times listed it "as a notable book of year by The New York Times Book Review", saying "It is successful not because of a new analysis of fact but because of its author's abiding descriptive powers; he presents a vast warring frontier filled with people who, no matter how familiar their names and actions have become, often baffle us". Susan Jacoby also of the Post said of his book Between Heaven and Hell: The Story of A Thousand Years of Artistic Life in Russia, it "surely represents a rare triumph of atavistic editorial support for a serious historical work over the commercial bottom line" and saying he "is at his best on Russia's earliest cultural roots and on the emergence of an influential avant-garde between 1890 and the early 1920s" but also criticized, saying "the book is weakest on the post-Stalin era, reading too much like a cut-and-paste compendium of well-known literary biographies" and "failure to discuss the samizdat phenomenon at length".

== Personal life ==
Three marriages ended in divorce. In 1984 he married Mary Eagle Lincoln, and together they cared for two daughters, Virginia Wallace and Mary Margaret Matzek. He died on April 9, 2000, at Kishwaukee Hospital in DeKalb, Illinois, of complications due to cancer.

== Northern Illinois lecture series ==
After Lincoln's death Northern Illinois University established the W. Bruce Lincoln Endowed Lecture Series to "engage key issues and are often interdisciplinary, in the spirit of Professor Lincoln’s research, writing and teaching". Among the notables who have spoken at the lectures are America historian and author Timothy D. Snyder, Richard White, Walter LaFeber John W. Dower, Jonathan Spence, and Ramón A. Gutiérrez, Lizabeth Cohen

== Sources ==
- Lee Congdon, "W. Bruce Lincoln, 1938-2000," Slavic Review (Spring 2001) 60 no. 1, 229–230.
