= Pushkin House, London =

Russian cultural centre in London, England

Coordinates: 51.5182°N 0.1231°W

Pushkin House
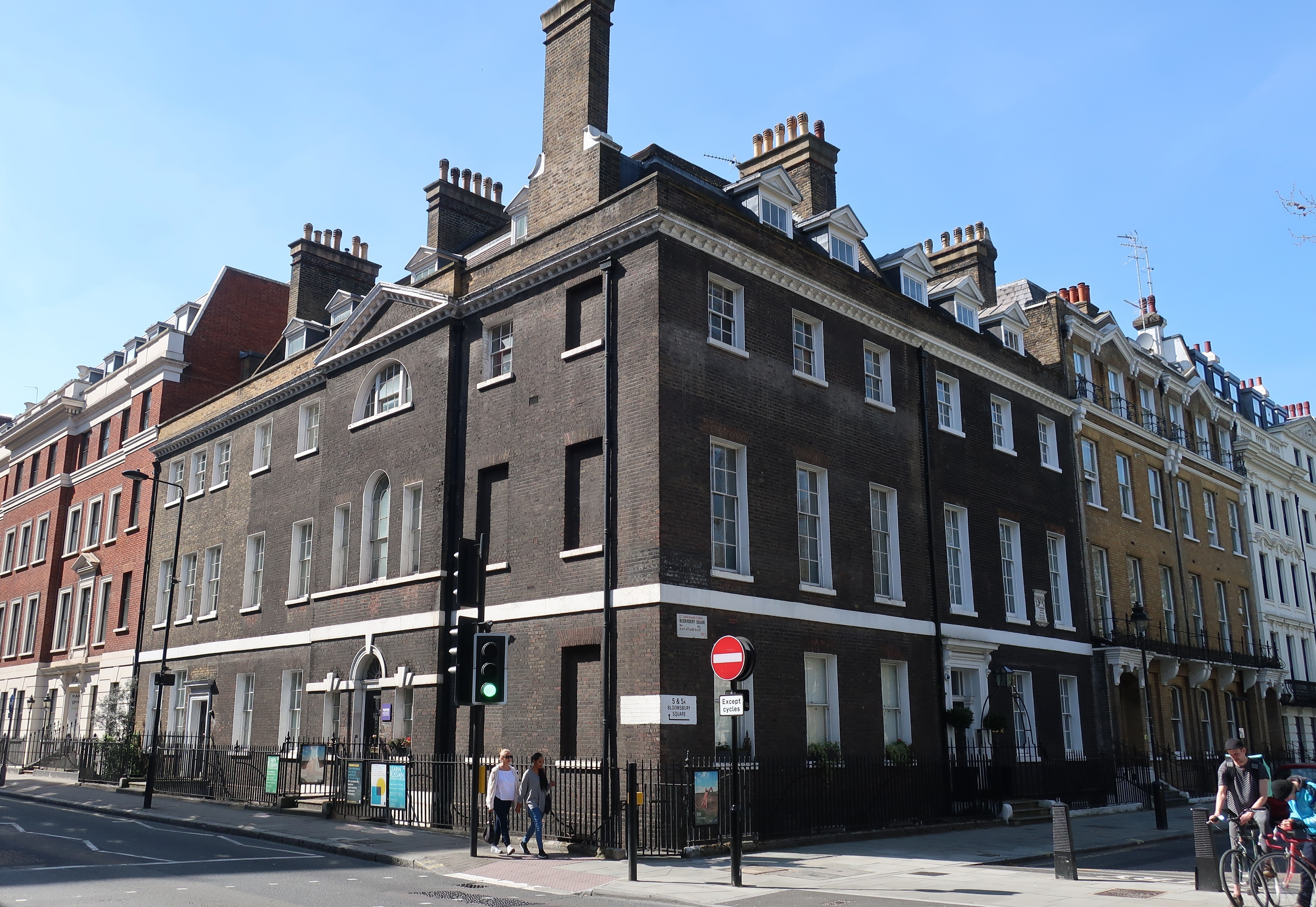

- Location within Central London
- Established: 1954
- Location: 5a Bloomsbury Square, London, WC1
- Director: Elena Sudakova
- Public transit access: Holborn; Tottenham Court Road
- Website: www.pushkinhouse.org

Listed Building – Grade II*
- Official name: Numbers 5, 5a and 6 and attached railings and lamp holder
- Designated: 24 October 1951
- Reference no.: 1244506

Pushkin House (Russian: Пушкинский Дом), established in 1954, is the UK's oldest independent Russian cultural centre, now based in Bloomsbury, London. It was founded by a group of émigré Russian friends, led by Maria Mikhailovna Kullmann (Zernova), with the aim of creating a welcoming meeting-place "for the enjoyment, understanding and promotion of Russian culture in all its forms, and for the exchange of views in a lively, informal atmosphere, with freedom of speech a core principle".

It continues to host a programme of Russian literature, poetry, art, cinema, music, theatre and dance, history, philosophy and current affairs. Events include lectures, exhibitions, films, concerts, readings, panel discussions, debates and an annual Book Prize. It is a politically independent, registered UK charity, owned and run by the Pushkin House Trust. While its original endowment ensures its independence, it also derives an income from ticket sales and donations from the public.

== History ==
In 1953 Maria Kullmann recognised a need in London for a politically neutral centre of Russian culture. With a small group of family and friends she bought 24 Kensington Park Gardens, Notting Hill, as a house for students and academics of all nationalities. The first meeting of the Pushkin Club was held there in 1954. By 1956 it was clear that the club needed premises of its own, and it subsequently bought 46 Ladbroke Grove. This remained its home until 2006, when it moved to its current premises at nos 5, 5a and 6 Bloomsbury Square, a listed building of the 1740s.

Since its foundation, Pushkin House has borne witness to dramatic changes in the relationship between Britain and Russia. The establishment of the original Pushkin House coincided with the immediate post-Stalin years and the "Khrushchev Thaw", when interest in things Russian was intense. These years were marked, for example, by the first yearly visits of the Bolshoi and Kirov (now Mariinsky) Opera and Ballet companies. Several distinguished scholars, writers and artists of the post-revolutionary emigration were still alive, and the Pushkin Club provided them with an effective platform.

Speakers in the early days included Metropolitan Anthony, Sir Isaiah Berlin and Dame Elizabeth Hill. In 1955, Tamara Karsavina spoke of her life in ballet; the following year Edward Crankshaw talked of the Soviet Union in the aftermath of the 20th Party Congress. Scriabin's sister and Medtner's widow were both regular attendees. The poet Korney Chukovsky performed at the club in June 1962.

Mstislav Dobuzhinsky, one of the last surviving members of Mir Iskusstva, held more than one exhibition in the club and presented several of stage designs to the club. There was an exhibition of paintings and lithographs by Leonid Pasternak. Soviet writers brought to the UK by the British Council would often come and talk at the Pushkin Club; they included Konstantin Fedin and Alexander Tvardovsky in 1960. It also provided a rehearsal venue for the London Balalaika Ensemble, also popular during the 1960s. The Pushkin Club enabled people from opposite ends of the political spectrum to meet and discuss; this remains a firm commitment of Pushkin House to the present.

== Activities ==
Pushkin House aims to serve as a home and showcase for Russian culture in London, a focus for Anglo-Russian cultural exchange, a provider of education and information on Russian language and culture, and a resource and networking centre for individuals and institutions. In pursuit of these aims, it has developed a cultural programme relating to Russian literature, art, film, music, theatre and dance, as well as history, philosophy and politics. Events include lectures and talks, seminars, conferences, exhibitions, films, concerts and readings.

Besides its own events, Pushkin House collaborates with other institutions and groups dedicated to Russian culture. It hosts lectures run by the Pushkin Club and the GB-Russia Society, among others. Russian language courses are provided by the Russian Language Centre, located on the top floor of the building. Creative partnerships exist with museums and libraries in Russia.

In response to Russia's military operation in Ukraine which started on 24th February 2022, Pushkin House focused resources on understanding the background of the Russo-Ukrainian war, promoting anti-war voices and reassessing Russia's political and cultural legacy. It has hosted solidarity events to raise £27,000 for charities supporting people impacted by the war. The challenges of cultural institution-building on the ruins of imperialism continue to be at the core of its programming. Its mission today as an arts, cultural and social space is to explore, challenge and debate Russia's culture and identity today.

== Pushkin House Book Prize ==
The Pushkin House Book Prize was launched in 2013 with an aim to "encourage public understanding and intelligent debate about the Russian-speaking world". The prize aims to encourage, support and award authors who contribute to our understanding of Russia's complex culture, history and people, including the new realities since 24 February 2022.

The prize is for a book published in English, but translations from other languages, including Russian, are encouraged.

Winners

- 2013 – Former People: The Last Days of the Russian Aristocracy by Douglas Smith
- 2014 – Red Fortress: The Secret Heart of Russia's History by Catherine Merridale
- 2015 – The Last Empire by Serhii Plokhy
- 2016 – Towards the Flame by Dominic Lieven
- 2017 – The Russian Canvas: Painting in Imperial Russia (1757–1881) by Rosalind P. Blakesley
- 2018 – The War Within by Alexis Peri
- 2019 – Chernobyl: The History of a Nuclear Catastrophe by Serhii Plokhy
- 2020 – The Return of the Russian Leviathan by Sergei Medvedev
- 2021 – The Human Factor by Archie Brown
- 2022 – Not One Inch by M. E. Sarotte
- 2023 – Overreach by Owen Matthews
- 2024 – I Love Russia by Elena Kostyuchenko
- 2025 – To the Success of Our Hopeless Cause : The Many Lives of the Soviet Dissident Movement by Benjamin Nathans
