= Pushkin House Russian Book Prize =

Annual English-language book prize for non-fiction writing about Russia

The Pushkin House Book Prize is an annual book prize, awarded to the best non-fiction writing on Russia in the English language. The prize was inaugurated in 2013. The prize amount as of 2020 has been £10,000. The advisory board for the prize is made up of Russia experts including Rodric Braithwaite, Andrew Jack, Bridget Kendall, Andrew Nurnberg, Marc Polonsky, and Douglas Smith.

== Honorees ==
Pushkin House Russian Book Prize winners and shortlists
Year	Author(s)	Title	Publisher	Result	Ref.
2013 (Note: The 2013 judges were Sir Rodric Braithwaite, A.D. Miller, Rachel Polonsky, Lord Robert Skidelsky, and Dmitri V. Trenin.)	Douglas Smith	Former People: The Final Days of the Russian Aristocracy	Farrar, Straus and Giroux	Winner	
2013	Anne Applebaum	Iron Curtain: The Crushing of Eastern Europe, 1944–1956	Allen Lane	Shortlist	
2013	Masha Gessen	The Man Without a Face: The Unlikely Rise of Vladimir Putin	Riverhead Books	Shortlist	
2013	Thane Gustafson	Wheel of Fortune: The Battle for Oil and Power in Russia	Harvard University Press	Shortlist	
2013	Donald Raleigh	Soviet Baby Boomers: An Oral History of Russia’s Cold War Generation	Oxford University Press	Shortlist	
2013	Karl Schlögel	Moscow 1937	Polity	Shortlist	
2014 (Note: The 2014 judging panel was chaired by Dr. Rowan Williams and included Boris Akunin, Viv Groskop, Catriona Kelly, and Douglas Smith.)	Catherine Merridale	Red Fortress: The Secret Heart of Russia's History	Allen Lane	Winner	
2014	Vladimir Alexandrov	The Black Russian	Head of Zeus	Shortlist	
2014	Sheila Fitzpatrick	A Spy in the Archives: a Memoir of Cold War Russia	I.B. Tauris	Shortlist	
2014	Owen Matthews	Glorious Misadventures: Nikolai Rezanov and the Dream of a Russian America	Bloomsbury	Shortlist	
2014	Anya von Bremzen	Mastering The Art of Soviet Cooking	Transworld	Shortlist	
2014	Stephen Walsh	Mussorgsky and His Circle: a Russian Musical Adventure	Faber and Faber	Shortlist	
2015 (Note: The 2015 judges were Lord Browne of Madingley, Dmitry Bykov, Varya Gornostaeva, Bridget Kendall, and Catherine Merridale.)	Serhii Plokhy	The Last Empire: The Final Days of the Soviet Union	Oneworld Publications	Winner	
2015	Peter Finn and Petra Couvée	The Zhivago Affair: The Kremlin, the CIA, and the Battle over a Forbidden Book	Harvill Secker/Vintage Books	Shortlist	
2015	Jacek Hugo-Bader, trans. by Antonia Lloyd-Jones	Kolyma Diaries: A Journey into Russia’s Haunted Hinterland	Portobello Books	Shortlist	
2015	Catriona Kelly	St Petersburg: Shadows of the Past	Yale University Press	Shortlist	
2015	Stephen Kotkin	Stalin: Paradoxes of Power, 1878–1928	Penguin Press	Shortlist	
2015	Peter Pomerantsev	Nothing Is True and Everything Is Possible: The Surreal Heart of the New Russia	Faber and Faber	Shortlist	
2016 (Note: The 2016 judges were Geoffrey Hosking, Anne McElvoy, Mikhail Borisovich Piotrovsky, and Baroness Smith of Gilmorehill.)	Dominic Lieven	Towards the Flame: Empire, War and the End of Tsarist Russia	Penguin Press	Winner	
2016	Gabriel Gorodetsky (ed.)	Maisky Diaries: Red Ambassador to the Court of St James’s 1932-43	Yale University Press	Shortlist	
2016	Oleg Khlevniuk, trans. by Nora Seligman Favorov	Stalin: New Biography of a Dictator (Note: Stalin: New Biography of a Dictator was named the Best Russian Book in Translation.)	Yale University Press	Shortlist	
2016	Bobo Lo	Russia and the New World Disorder	Brookings Institution	Shortlist	
2016	Alfred Rieber	Stalin and the Struggle for Supremacy in Eurasia	Cambridge University Press	Shortlist	
2016	Robert Service	The End of the Cold War: 1985-1991	Pan Macmillan	Shortlist	
2017 (Note: The 2017 judging panel was chaired by Simon Franklin and included Anne Applebaum, Petr Aven, Dominic Lieven, and Charlotte Hobson.)	Rosalind Blakesley	The Russian Canvas: Painting in Imperial Russia 1757-1881	Yale University Press	Winner	
2017	Daniel Beer	The House of the Dead: Siberian Exile Under the Tsars	Allen Lane	Shortlist	
2017	Anne Garrels	Putin Country: A Journey into the Real Russia	Farrar, Straus and Giroux	Shortlist	
2017	Simon Sebag Montefiore	The Romanovs: 1613–1918	Orion	Shortlist	
2017	Simon Morrison	Bolshoi Confidential: Secrets of the Russian Ballet from the Tsars to Today	Fourth Estate	Shortlist	
2017	Teffi, trans. by Robert Chandler, Elizabeth Chandler, Anne Marie Jackson and Irina Steinberg with an introduction by Edyth C. Haber	Memories: From Moscow to the Black Sea (Note: Memories was named the year's best Russian book in translation.)	Pushkin Press	Shortlist	
2018 (Note: The 2018 judging panel was chaired by Nick Clegg and included Rosalind Blakesley, Oleg Budnitskii, Dervla Murphy, and John Thornhill.)	Alexis Peri	The War Within: Diaries From the Siege of Leningrad	Harvard University Press	Winner	
2018	Rodric Braithwaite	Armageddon and Paranoia: The Nuclear Confrontation	Profile Books	Shortlist	
2018	Victoria Lomasko, trans. from Russian by Thomas Campbell	Other Russias (Note: Other Russias was named the year's best Russian book in translation.)	Penguin (first pub. by N+1)	Shortlist	
2018	Olivier Rolin, trans. from French by Ros Schwartz	Stalin’s Meteorologist: One Man’s Untold Story of Love, Life, and Death	Penguin	Shortlist	
2018	Yuri Slezkine	The House of Government: A Saga of the Russian Revolution	Princeton University Press	Shortlist	
2018	William Taubman	Gorbachev: His Life and Times	Simon & Schuster	Shortlist	
2019 (Note: The 2019 judging panel was chaired by Sergey Guriyev and included Rachel Campbell-Johnson, Alexander Drozdov, Alexis Peri, and Andrei Zorin.)	Serhii Plokhy	Chernobyl: The History of a Nuclear Catastrophe	Penguin	Winner	
2019	Taylor Downing	1983: The World at the Brink	Little, Brown Book Group	Shortlist	
2019	Mark Galeotti	The Vory: Russia’s Super Mafia	Yale University Press	Shortlist	
2019	Eleonory Gilburd	To See Paris And Die: The Soviet Lives of Western Culture	Harvard University Press	Shortlist	
2019	Ben Macintyre	The Spy and the Traitor: The Greatest Espionage Story of the Cold War	Viking	Shortlist	
2019	Katja Petrowskaja	Maybe Esther: A Family Story	4th Estate	Shortlist	
2020 (Note: The 2020 judges were Serhii Plokhy, Celestine Bohlen, Julia Safronova, and Richard Wright.)	Sergei Medvedev	The Return of the Russian Leviathan	Polity	Winner	
2020	Brian Boeck	Stalin's Scribe: The Life of Mikhail Sholokhov	Pegasus Books	Shortlist	
2020	Kate Brown	Manual for Survival: A Chernobyl Guide to the Future	W. W. Norton & Company	Shortlist	
2020	Bathsheba Demuth	Floating Coast: An Environmental History of the Bering Strait	W. W. Norton & Company	Shortlist	
2020	Owen Matthews	An Impeccable Spy: Richard Sorge, Stalin’s Master Agent	Bloomsbury	Shortlist	
2020	Joan Neuberger	This Thing of Darkness: Eisenstein's Ivan the Terrible in Stalin's Russia	Cornell University Press	Shortlist	
2021 (Note: The 2021 judges were Fiona Hill, Declan Donnellan, Sergei Medvedev, George Robertson, and Maria Stepanova.)	Archie Brown	The Human Factor: Gorbachev, Reagan, and Thatcher, and the End of the Cold War	Oxford University Press	Winner	
2021	Catherine Belton	Putin’s People: How the KGB Took Back Russia and Then Took On the West	Picador	Shortlist	
2021	Evgeny Dobrenko	Late Stalinism: The Aesthetics of Politics	Yale University Press	Shortlist	
2021	Jonathan Schneer	The Lockhart Plot: Murder, Betrayal and Counter-Revolution in Lenin's Russia	Oxford University Press	Shortlist	
2021	Andrei Zorin	Leo Tolstoy	Reaktion Books	Shortlist	
2021	Katherine Zubovich	Moscow Monumental: Soviet Skyscrapers and Urban Life in Stalin's Capital	Princeton University Press	Shortlist	
2022 (Note: The 2022 judges were Evgenia Arbugaeva, Baroness Deborah Bull, Archie Brown (historian), Dmitry Glukhovsky, Ekaterina Schulmann.)	Mary Sarotte	Not One Inch: America, Russia, and the Making of Post-Cold War Stalemate	Yale University Press	Winner	
2022	Frank Billé and Caroline Humphrey	On the Edge: Life along the Russia-China Border	Harvard University Press	Shortlist	
2022	Jan Matti Dollbaum, Morvan Lallouet and Ben Noble	Navalny: Putin's Nemesis, Russia's Future?	Oxford University Press	Shortlist	
2022	Timothy Frye	Weak Strongman: The Limits of Power in Putin's Russia	Princeton University Press	Shortlist	
2022	Thane Gustafson	Klimat: Russia in the Age of Climate Change	Harvard University Press	Shortlist	
2022	Maria Stepanova	In Memory of Memory	New Directions Publishing	Shortlist	
2022	Deyan Sudjic	Stalin’s Architect: Power and Survival in Moscow	MIT Press	Shortlist	
2022	Lucy Ward	The Empress and the English Doctor: How Catherine the Great Defied a Deadly Virus	Oneworld Publications	Shortlist	
2022	Elizabeth Wilson	Playing with Fire: The Story of Maria Yudina- Pianist in Stalin’s Russia	Yale University Press	Shortlist	
2022	Vladislav Zubok	Collapse: The Fall of the Soviet Union	Yale University Press	Shortlist	
2023 (Note: The 2023 judges were Ekaterina Schulmann, Philip Bullock, Masha Gessen, Alexander Rodnyansky, and Mary Elise Sarotte.)	Owen Matthews	Overreach: The Inside Story of Putin and Russia’s War Against Ukraine	Mudlark	Winner	
2023	Ryan Tucker Jones	Red Leviathan: The Secret History of Soviet Whaling	University of Chicago Press	Shortlist	
2023	Jade McGlynn	Russia’s War	Polity	Shortlist	
2023	Olga Petri	Places of Tenderness and Heat: The Queer Milieu of Fin-de-Siècle St. Petersburg	Cornell University Press	Shortlist	
2023	Natasha Lance Rogoff	Muppets in Moscow: The Unexpected Crazy True Story of Making Sesame Street in Russia	Rowman & Littlefield Publishers	Shortlist	
2023	Tricia Starks	Cigarettes and Soviets: Smoking in the USSR	Cornell University Press	Shortlist	
2024 (Note: The 2024 judges were Philip Bullock, Ruth Maclennan, Anna Narinskaya, and Gulnaz Sharafutdinova.)	Elena Kostyuchenko	I Love Russia: Reporting from a Lost Country by Elena Kostyuchenko	Bodley Head	Winner	
2024	Julie A. Cassiday	Russian Style: Performing Gender, Power, and Putinism	University of Wisconsin Press	Shortlist	
2024	Dan Healey	The Gulag Doctors: Life, Death, and Medicine in Stalin's Labour Camps	Yale University Press	Shortlist	
2024	Tom Parfitt	High Caucasus: A Mountain Quest in Russia's Haunted Hinterland	Headline Book Publishing	Shortlist	
2024	Serhii Plokhy	The Russo-Ukrainian War: The Return of History	Allen Lane	Shortlist	
2024	Laur Vallikivi	Words and Silences: Nenets Reindeer Herders and Russian Evangelical Missionaries in the Post-Soviet Arctic	Indiana University Press	Shortlist	
2025 (Note: The 2025 judges were Gulnaz Sharafutdinova, Tony Barber, Polina Barskova, Laurie Bristow and Elena Kostyuchenko .)	Benjamin Nathans	To the Success of Our Hopeless Cause: The Many Lives of the Soviet Dissident Movement	Princeton University Press	Winner	
2025	Howard Amos	Russia Starts Here: Real Lives in the Ruins of Empire	Bloomsbury Continuum	Shortlist	
2025	Lucy Ash	The Baton and the Cross: Russia's Church from Pagans to Putin	Icon Books	Shortlist	
2025	Alexei Navalny, translated by Arch Tait & Stephen Dalziel	Patriot	Bodley Head	Shortlist	
2025	Sergey Radchenko	To Run the World: The Kremlin's Cold War Bid for Global Power	Cambridge University Press	Shortlist	
2025	Donald Rayfield	'A Seditious and Sinister Tribe’ : The Crimean Tatars and Their Khanate	Reaktion Books	Shortlist	
