= Dan E. Davidson =

American linguist

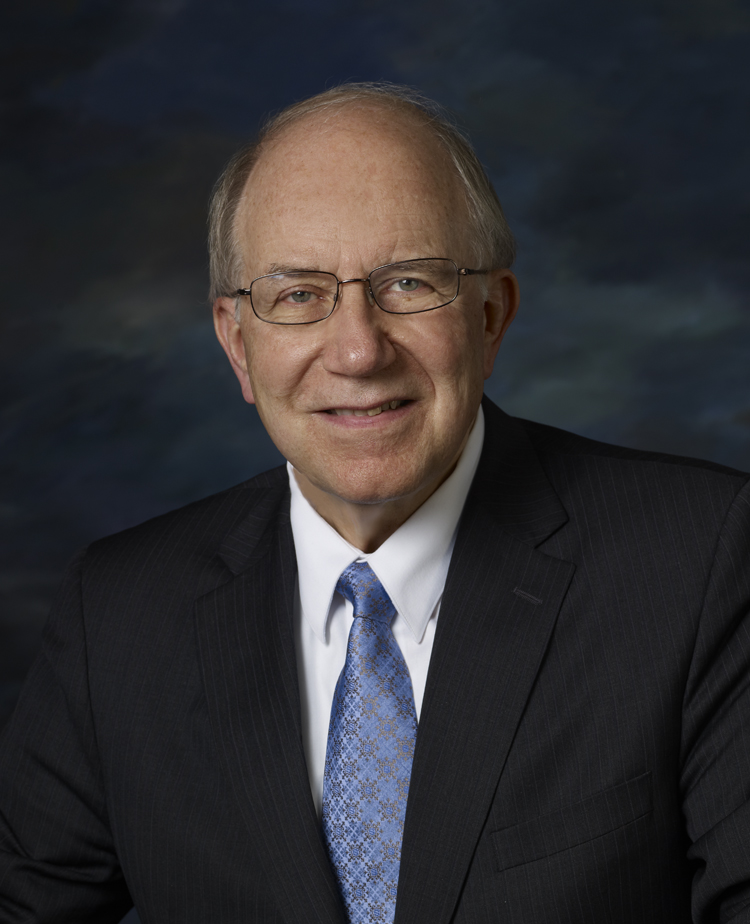
- Born: Wichita, Kansas, United States

Academic background
- Education: University of Kansas; Harvard University

Academic work
- Sub-discipline: Second-Language Acquisition, Russian studies, international education
- Institutions: Bryn Mawr College; American Councils for International Education; Amherst College

Dan E. Davidson is an American linguist working at the intersection of Russian studies, second-language acquisition and international educational development. He is the president emeritus and co-founder of American Councils for International Education and professor emeritus of Russian and Second Language Acquisition at Bryn Mawr College.

== Career ==
Davidson received his B.A. from the University of Kansas in 1965, majoring in German, Russian, Humanities, and Slavic and Soviet Area Studies. He also studied Germanic and Slavic Studies at Rheinische Kaiser Friedrich–Wilhelms Universität (University of Bonn) in Bonn, Germany. He went on to complete his M.A. and Ph.D. degrees in Slavic Languages and Literatures from Harvard University, focusing on Russian Literature, Russian Linguistics, Serbo-Croatian, and German/Russian Literary Relations. Upon graduation, he taught Russian at Amherst College from 1971 to 1976, and then at Bryn Mawr College from 1976 to the present. He has also held adjunct or visiting professorships at Columbia University, Harvard University, University of Maryland College Park, and University of Pennsylvania.

In 1976, following several preliminary attempts by both American and Russian scholars to expand exchange of scholarship between the U.S. and the Soviet Union, Davidson co-founded the American Council of Teachers of Russian (ACTR), which would later become American Councils for International Education. The membership organization sponsored many activities associated with Russian language study, including efforts to expand existing scholarly and student exchanges in language and area studies between the U.S. and the Soviet Union. Over the years, American Councils has expanded from a small membership organization with a single graduate exchange program to a well-known federally funded exchange organization that operates in over 80 countries, focusing on the instruction of critical languages and academic exchange with less commonly studied world regions and cultures.

In addition to his work with American Councils, Davidson has held leadership roles in a number of international organizations and educational initiatives, including serving as co-chair of the "Transformation of the Humanities Program," funded by philanthropist George Soros, in Russia, Ukraine, and Belarus. The project produced over 400 new textbooks in the humanities and social sciences for use in Russia, Ukraine and Belarus between 1992 and 1995. Davidson is the co-founder and chair (2006–present) of the Center for Education, Assessment and Teaching Methods (CEATM) in Bishkek (Kyrgyzstan), the first independent, merit-based university admissions testing program in the former Soviet space. He also served as Vice President of the International Association of Teachers of Russian Language and Literature (MAPRYAL) from 1994 to the present and Vice-Chair of the Board of Governors of the European Humanities University from 2007 to 2016.

In the U.S., Davidson served as elected Chairman of the Alliance for International Educational and Cultural Exchange from 1996 to 1999. He has also been a member of the National Board for Professional Teaching Standards (NBPTS) Committee on World Languages from 1999 to 2001 and 2007–2009, the Board of Directors of World Education Services from 2000 to 2007, and the Modern Language Association Executive Committee of the Division on the Teaching of Language from 2006 to 2010. Davidson was the elected President of the Joint National Committee for Language (JNCL) from 2008 to 2012, the chair of the World Language Academic Advisory Committee of the College Board from 2012 to 2015, and the president of the American Council of Teachers of Russian (ACTR). He currently serves as ACTR's Executive Director.

In 2015, Davidson was named to the Commission on Languages, American Academy of Arts and Sciences, which produced reports at the request of the US Congress on the current state of U.S. capacity in languages other than English: The State of Languages in the U.S.: A Statistical Portrait and America's Languages: Investing in Language Education for the 21st Century.

== Work ==
Davidson has authored thirteen books and more than 60 academic articles, including a twenty-year longitudinal study of adult second language acquisition during study abroad. Davidson co-authored the Russian: Stage One textbook series, the first collaborative Soviet-American Russian language textbook, which continues to be used in its revised form today.

His scholarly articles cover the disciplines of historical semantics ("N.M. Karamzin and the New Critical Vocabulary: Toward a Semantic History of the Term Romantic in Russian," 1974), lexical pragmatics ("The Bilingual Associative Dictionary of the Languages of Russian an American Youth," 2004), and second-language acquisition ("The Development of L2 Proficiency and Literacy within the context of the Federally Supported Overseas Language Training Programs for Americans," 2015). In 2016, he published "Assessing Language Proficiency and Intercultural Development in the Overseas Immersion Context." In 2021, Davidson was editor and contributor for Transformative Language Learning and Teaching.

Transformative Language Learning and Teaching was awarded the AATSEEL Prize for Best Book in Pedagogy at the organization's National Conference in February 2022, calling it "a groundbreaking volume on the theory and practice of transformative teaching in the language learning context." In 2023, the Modern Language Association recognized Transformative Language Learning and Teaching with the Kenneth W. Mildenberger Prize for its comprehensive exploration of transformative learning theory and practice in the language field.

Davidson's comparison of the face-to-face and "virtual immersion" on the linguistic and cultural growth of young adult English-speaking learners of Arabic, Chinese, and Russian, co-authored with Nadra Garas, “What Makes Study Abroad Transformative? Comparing Linguistic and Cultural Contacts and Learning Outcomes in Virtual vs In-Person Contexts” appeared in the University of California, Berkeley L2 Journal, 15(2), 2023, pp. 71–91.

== Media appearances ==
Davidson's work has been cited on multiple occasions on the subjects of exchanges, language study, and the impact of changing U.S.-Russia relations on academic exchanges in The New York Times , The Chronicle of Higher Education, Inside Higher Education, and other publications domestically and abroad.

== Congressional testimony ==
Davidson has also presented oral testimony by invitation on four occasions to the U.S. Senate. In March 1992, he testified before the U.S. Senate Committee on Foreign Relations Subcommittee on European Affairs. On September 19, 2000, Davidson made a statement to the U.S. Senate Committee on Homeland Security and Government Affairs Subcommittee on International Security, Proliferation, and Federal Services. He has testified twice before the U.S. Senate Committee on Homeland Security and Governmental Affairs Subcommittee on Oversight of Government Management, the Federal Workforce, and the District of Columbia. The May 2012 hearing, titled "A National Security Crisis: Foreign Language Capabilities in the Federal Government," identified a shortage of personnel qualified to fill language-designated positions in key government agencies and offered strategies for increasing the number of Americans possessing advanced proficiency in both language and regional knowledge.

He has presented oral testimony by invitation on two occasions to the U.S. House Committee on Appropriations Subcommittee on State, Foreign Operations, and Related Programs.

== Selected publications ==
- Davidson, Dan E.; Gor, Kira S.; Lekic, Maria D. (2009). Live from Russia! Russian Stage 1 (Revised and Updated ed.). ISBN 9780757552014.
- Davidson, Dan E. (1993). Predictors of Foreign Language Gain During Study Abroad. NFLC Occasional Papers: 37-66.
- Davidson, Dan E. (2004). The Bilingual Associative Dictionary of the Language of Russian and American Youth. Journal of the Linguistic Society of St. Petersburg. 7: 39-48.
- Davidson, Dan E. (2010). Study abroad: When, how long, and with what results? New data from the Russian front. Foreign Language Annals, 43(1), 6-26. doi:10.1111/j.1944-9720.2010.01057.x
- Davidson, Dan E., & Lekic, Maria D. (2010) The Overseas Immersion Setting as Contextual Variable in Adult SLA: Learner Behaviors Associated with Language Gain to Level-‐‑3 Proficiency in Russian. Russian Language Journal. 60(1), 53-77.
- Davidson, Dan E., & Lekic Maria D. (2012). Comparing Heritage and Non-Heritage Learning Outcomes and Target-Language Utilization in the Overseas Immersion Context: A Preliminary Study of the Russian Flagship. Russian Language Journal. 62: 42-78. doi:10.70163/0036-0252.1157
- Davidson, Dan E. (2015). The Development of L2 Proficiency and Literacy within the Context of the Federally Supported Overseas Language Training Programs for Americans. In T. Brown & J. Bown (Eds.), To Advanced Proficiency and Beyond: Theory and Methods for Developing Superior Second-Language Ability. (pp. 117–150). Georgetown University Press.
- Davidson, D.E., Garas, N., & Lekic, M.D. (2016). Assessing Language Proficiency and Intercultural Development in the Overseas Immersion Context. In D. Murphy & K. Evans-Romaine (Eds.), Exploring the US Language Flagship Program. Professional Competence in a Second Language by Graduation. (pp. 156–176). Multilingual Matters, Bristol, UK. doi:10.21832/9781783096107-012
- Davidson, Dan E., & Shaw, Jane (2019). A Cross-Linguistic and Cross-Skill Perspective on L2 Development in Study Abroad. In P. Winke & S. M. Gass (Eds.), Foreign Language Proficiency in Higher Education (pp. 217–242). Springer. doi:10.1007/978-3-030-01006-5_12 ISBN 978-3-030-01005-8
- Davidson, Dan E., & Garas, Nadra (2020). "Emerging Trends in the Study of Russian in the US: K-16 Enrollments 2007 to 2016," Russian Language Journal, 70(1), 189-207. doi:10.70163/0036-0252.1035
- Davidson, Dan E., Leaver, Betty Lou, & Campbell, Christine. (Eds.) (2021). Transformative Language Learning and Teaching. Cambridge University Press. doi:10.1017/9781108870788 ISBN 978-1-108-87078-8
- Davidson, D. E., Garas. N., & Lekic, M. D. (2021). Transformative Language Learning in the Overseas Immersion Environment: Exploring Affordances of Intercultural Development. In B. L. Leaver, D. E. Davidson, C. Campbell (Eds.), Transformative Language Learning and Teaching (pp. 109–119). Cambridge University Press.
- Davidson, Dan E. (2021). Ensuring US National Capacity in World Languages and Cultures for the Twenty-First Century: More Learners, More Languages, Better Results!. International Education at the Crossroads. pp. 132–144. doi:10.2307/j.ctv1ghv48c.19. ISBN 978-0-253-05391-6. S2CID 234825648.
- Davidson, Dan E. (2021). Ensuring US National Capacity in World Languages and Cultures for the Twenty-First Century: More Learners, More Languages, Better Results! In D. N. Cohen and H. E. Kahn (Eds.), International Education at the Crossroads (pp. 132–144). Indiana University Press. ISBN 978-0-253-05390-9
- Davidson, Dan E., & Garas, Nadra (2023).What Makes Study Abroad Transformative? Comparing Linguistic and Cultural Contacts and Learning Outcomes in Virtual vs In-Person Contexts. L2 Journal, 15(2), 71–91. doi:10.5070/L215260148
- Comer, William J., & Davidson, Dan E. (2026). Assessing Proficiency Outcomes in the Russian Flagship Program, 2014-2024. In D. Pastushenkov and L. Zalaltdinova (Eds.), Assessment of Russian as a Foreign Language | Unlocking Proficiency (pp. 35–47). Routledge. ISBN 978-1-032-75811-4.
