= Julie Cassiday =

American literary scholar

Academic background
- Education: Stanford University (PhD); Grinnell College (BA)
- Thesis: The Theater of the World and the Theater of State: Drama and the Show Trial in Early Soviet Russia (1995)
- Doctoral advisor: Gregory Freidin
- Other advisors: Lazar Fleishman; Marjorie Perloff; Andrew Wachtel; Edward J. Brown

Academic work
- Discipline: literary scholar
- Sub-discipline: comparative literature
- Institutions: Williams College

Julie A. Cassiday is an American literary scholar and Willcox B. and Harriet M. Adsit Professor of Russian at Williams College. She is known for her expertise in comparative literature. Cassiday is a former president of the Association for Slavic, East European, and Eurasian Studies.

In 2024, her book Russian Style! Performing Gender in Putin’s Russia was shortlisted for the Pushkin House Russian Book Prize, and won The Svetlana Boym Best Book in Cultural Studies prize by AATSEEL.

== Select publications ==
- Russian Performances: Word, Object, Action. Co-edited with Julie A. Buckler and Boris Wolfson, University of Wisconsin Press, 2018
- The Enemy on Trial: Early Soviet Courts on Stage and Screen, Northern Illinois University Press 2000 (Russian translation, Academic Studies Press 2021)
- Russian Style! Performing Gender in Putin’s Russia, University of Wisconsin Press, 2024
