= Valerie Kivelson =

American historian

Valerie Ann Kivelson (born 1957) is a historian and slavicist.

Having taken her bachelor's degree at Harvard University in 1980 and her master's degree at the San Francisco State University in 1982, she finished her PhD at Stanford University in 1988. She became a Thomas N. Tentler Collegiate Professor and Arthur F. Thurnau Professor of History at the University of Michigan. From 2026 she is also a Thomas N. Tentler Distinguished University Professor of History.

She was awarded the Heldt Prize in 2007, has held fellowships of the American Council of Learned Societies, was elected as an international fellow of the British Academy in 2019 and received a Guggenheim Fellowship in 2022.

== Publications ==
- Autocracy in the Provinces: Russian Political Culture and the Gentry in the Seventeenth Century (1997)
- Cartographies of Tsardom: The Land and Its Meanings in Seventeenth-Century Russia (2006)
- Desperate Magic: The Moral Economy of Witchcraft in Seventeenth-Century Russia (2013)
- Russia's Empires (2016, with Ronald Grigor Suny)
- Witchcraft in Russia and Ukraine, 1000–1900: A Sourcebook (2020, editor, with Christine D. Worobec)
- Picturing Russian Empire (2023, editor, with Joan Neuberger and Sergey Kozlov)
