= Buckler (disambiguation) =

A buckler is a small shield used as a companion weapon

It may also refer to:

- Buckler, a low alcohol beer brewed by Heineken
- Buckler Cars, a British car company of the 1940s–1960s
- Buckler (nautical), a portable cover secured over a hawsepipe opening
- Buckler (surname), persons surnamed Buckler
