= Buckler (surname) =

Buckler is an English and German surname. Notable people with the surname include:

- Arthur Buckler (1882–1921), Welsh professional rugby league footballer
- Benjamin Buckler (1716/1717–1780), English antiquarian and academic
- Charles Alban Buckler (1824–1905), English author, architect and officer of arms
- Edward Buckler, American plant geneticist
- Ernest Buckler (1908–1984), Canadian novelist and short story author
- Ethan Buckler (born 1967), American musician and songwriter
- Hugh Buckler (1881–1936), British actor
- Julie A. Buckler, American literary scholar
- John Buckler (artist) (1770–1851), English artist and architect
- John Chessell Buckler (1793–1894), English architect
- Julius Buckler (1894–1960), German World War I fighter ace
- Kevin Buckler (born c. 1959, American race car driver and entrepreneur
- Philip Buckler (born 1949), English Anglican Church clergyman; Dean of Lincoln
- Rich Buckler (1949–2017), American comic book artist
- Rich T. Buckler (1865–1950), American politician
- Rick Buckler (1955–2025), English rock drummer
- Sandra Buckler (contemporary), aide to the Prime Minister of Canada 2006–08
- Susannah Buckler, Irish criminal
- Walter Buckler (died 1554/8), English diplomat, chamberlain, and secretary
- William Buckler (1814–1884), English painter and entomologist
- William Hepburn Buckler (1867–1952), French-American classical scholar, archaeologist, diplomat and lawyer
