= Beth Holmgren =

American literary critic and cultural historian

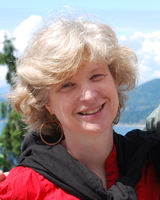
- Born: September 8, 1955 (age 70)
- Education: Harvard University; Grinnell College
- Occupations: Professor and Chair of the Department of Slavic and Eurasian Studies, Duke University
- Years active: 1987-present

Beth Holmgren (born September 8, 1955) is an American literary critic and a cultural historian in Polish and Russian studies. She is Professor and Chair of the Department of Slavic and Eurasian Studies at Duke University. Recognised for her scholarship in Russian women's studies and Polish cultural history (with a special emphasis on theater), she is as of July 2018 working on a multicultural history of fin-de-siecle Warsaw. Before coming to Duke, she taught at the University of California-San Diego (1987-1993) and the University of North Carolina at Chapel Hill (1993-2007). She earned her B.A at Grinnell College, and two master's degrees (Soviet Studies) and (Slavic Languages and Literatures) and her doctoral doctorate at Harvard University (Ph.D. completed in 1987).

Holmgren served as the president of ASEEES (2008), the largest North American organization in Slavic Studies, and president of the AWSS (2003-2005), the Association for Women in Slavic Studies. During her tenure at ASEEES, she wrote and produced, in collaboration with director Igor' Sopronenko, the film Modern Russian Feminism: Twenty Years Forward, which was first screened at the convention and then issued as a DVD. In addition to publishing extensively in major Russian and Slavic journals, she has published in Signs: Journal of Women in Culture and Society, Theatre Journal, Polin: Studies in Polish Jewry, Journal of Jewish Identities, the Russian-language journal Novoe literaturnoe obozrenie, and the Polish-language journals Teksty drugie, Pamiętnik teatralny, and Pamiętnik literacki.

== Awards and honors ==
- 1984-5: Fulbright-IREX dissertation fellowship
- 1986: JCEE/ACLS Dissertation Fellowship
- 1994: Association for Women in Slavic Studies best article
- 1995: JCEE/ACLS Postdoctoral Fellowship
- 1998: Waclaw Lednicki Humanities Prize, Polish Institute of Arts and Sciences
- 2000: Alumni Award, Grinnell College
- 2007: AATSEEL Award for Outstanding Contribution to the Profession
- 2009: Senior Scholar Award, Southern Conference on Slavic Studies
- 2012: Association of Theatre Research Society Barnard Hewitt Award for Theatre History, Honorable Mention
- 2012: Association for Women in Slavic Studies best book
- 2013: Oscar Halecki Award, Polish American Historical Association
- 2014: ASEEES Kulczycki Award
- 2017: Wacław Jędrzejewicz Award in Polish History, Piłsudski Institute

== Selected bibliography ==
=== Books ===
- Warsaw Is My Country: The Story of Krystyna Bierzyńska. Academic Studies Press, February 2018. ISBN 978-1618117595
- Starring Madame Modjeska: On Tour in Poland and America Indiana University Press, November 2011. ISBN 978-0253356642
- Rewriting Capitalism: Literature and the Market in the Late Tsarist Empire and the Kingdom of Poland. University of Pittsburgh Press, 1998. ISBN 978-0822956792
- Women's Works In Stalin's Time: On Lidiia Chukovskaia and Nadezhda Mandrelstam. Indiana University Press, 1993. ISBN 978-0253208293

=== Edited books ===
- Transgressive Women in Modern Russian and Eastern European Cultures: From the Bad to the Blasphemous, Co-edited with Yana Hashamova and Mark Lipovetsky. Routledge, 2016. ISBN 978-1138955578
- Americans Experience Russia: Encountering the Enigma, 1917-Present. Co-edited with Choi Chatterjee. Routledge, 2013. ISBN 978-0415893411
- Poles Apart: Women in Modern Polish Culture. Co-edited with Helena Goscilo, Slavica Press, 2006. ISBN 978-0893573355
- The Russian Memoir: History and Literature. Edited by Beth Holmgren. Northwestern University Press, 2003. ISBN 978-0810124288
- Russia.*Women*Culture. Co-edited with Helena Goscilo. Indiana University Press. 1996. ISBN 978-0253210449

=== Translation ===
- Keys to Happiness by Anastasya Verbitskaya. Edited, abridged, translated and introduced by Beth Holmgren and Helena Goscilo. Indiana University Press, 1999. ISBN 978-0253212993

=== DVD ===
- Modern Russian Feminism: Twenty Years Forward. Written and produced by Beth Holmgren. Directed by Igor’ Sopronenko. Indiana University Press, 2009. Format: Multiple Formats, Dolby, NTSC.
