= Judith Pallot =

British geographer

Judith Pallot FAcSS is professor emerita of the School of Geography and Environment, University of Oxford, expert in Soviet, East Central European, and Russian geography, in particular, Russia's penal geography and the geography of the Russian peasantry.

She studied her bachelor's degree at the University of Leeds. She earned her PhD from the University College London.

In 2008, she was awarded the title of distinction of Professor of the Human Geography of Russia by the University of Oxford. She was elected Academician of the Academy of Social Sciences in 2012.

== Books ==
- 2012: (with Laura Piacentini, with the assistance of Dominique Moran) Gender, Geography, and Punishment: The Experience of Women in Carceral Russia
  - The first English-language book dealing with the subject of women's imprisonment in the Russian Federation
  - 2013 AWSS Heldt Prize – Best book in Slavic/Eastern European/Eurasian Women's Studies
- 2007: (with Tatyana Nefedova) Russia's unknown Agriculture: Household production in the post-Soviet countryside
- 1999: Land Reform in Russia, 1906–1917: Peasant Responses to Stolypin's Project of Rural Transformation
- 1990: 1981: (with Denis J. B. Shaw) Landscape and Settlement in Romanov Russia, 1613-1917
- 1981: (with Denis J. B. Shaw) Planning in the Soviet Union
