= Krugosvet =

Russian-language encyclopedia

Krugosvet is a Russian-language encyclopedia covering different fields of knowledge in eight supercategories and 27 subcategories, 12,000 entries, over 600 current and historic maps, and 10,000 illustrations and charts. It is intended to provide objective, non-ideological, easily accessible information for research and other purposes.

The encyclopedia is available for free online and was previously supported by Open Society Institute’s Information Program. According to Yandex portal, that also hosts Krugosvet, it is "comparable to the Great Soviet Encyclopedia in its size and significance".

Along with former Stanford colleague, Robert Ball, Prof. Gregory Freidin founded a Moscow publishing company, The Russian Britannica LLC., which has since evolved into Krugosvet's publication. Every third Krugosvet article has been translated from Collier's Encyclopedia.
