= Alexis Peri =

American historian

Alexis Peri is an American historian. She received her PhD from the University of California, Berkeley and currently teaches Russian and Soviet history at Boston University. Her book The War Within (Harvard University Press, 2017), based on diaries from the Siege of Leningrad, won the 2018 Pushkin House Book Prize and the 2018 University of Southern California Book Prize in Literary and Cultural Studies. It also received an Honorable Mention for the 2018 Reginald Zelnik Book Prize in History. Her next major project is tentatively titled Dear Unknown Friend: Soviet and American Women Discover the Power of the Personal and explores the phenomenon of pen-friendships between Soviet and American women during the Second World War and the Cold War.

== Awards ==
- 2018 - Pushkin House Best English-language non-fiction book - The War Within
- 2018 - AATSEEL Best Book in Cultural Studies - The War Within
- 2018 - USC Book Prize in Literary and Cultural Studies for The War Within
