= Eliot Borenstein =

American Slavist

Eliot Borenstein (Note: The surname is pronounced rhyming with “Foreign wine”) is an author and professor of Russian and Slavic Studies at New York University. His main interests are Russian contemporary literature and cultural studies, conspiracy theories, and internet culture.

== Biography ==
Borenstein grew up in Bexley, Ohio, a suburb of Columbus. He earned a B.A. (Russian language and literature) in 1988 from Oberlin College, an M.A. (Slavic languages and literatures) in 1989 from University of Wisconsin–Madison, and a Ph.D. (Slavic languages and literatures) in 1993, also from University of Wisconsin–Madison. In 1992, he was stationed in Moscow as the resident director of the University of Wisconsin–Madison exchange program with Moscow State University.

Borenstein joined the NYU Faculty of Arts and Science’s department of Russian & Slavic studies in 1995. Before that he was an assistant professor at the University of Virginia (1993–95) and was the director of the Fulbright Program for the Russian Federation. As of 2024 he is vice chancellor and vice provost for global programs at New York University.

== Books ==
- Men without Women: Masculinity and Revolution in Russian Fiction, 1917-1929
  2001 AATSEEL book prize
- Overkill: Sex and Violence in Contemporary Russian Popular Culture
  2008 AWSS Heldt Prize
- Plots against Russia: Conspiracy and Fantasy after Socialism
  "...analyzes Russian national myths and disturbingly popular beliefs in the internet age"... "Borenstein demonstrates how a sense of historical loss and post-1989 political traumas have shaped a significant part of Russian political consciousness in the 21st century."
  2020 Wayne S. Vucinich book prize and 2020 AATSEEL book prize
- 2020: Pussy Riot: Speaking Punk to Power
- 2023:Marvel Comics in the 1970s: The World Inside Your Head
- 2022:Meanwhile, in Russia…: Russian Internet Memes and Viral Video
- 2023:HBO’s The Leftovers: Mourning and Melancholy on Premium Cable
- 2024: Harry Potter in Russia: The Politics of Enchantment under Putin
- 2024: Russian Culture under Putin, Bloomsbury Academic
  From publisher's description: " It considers how, when Vladimir Putin came to power in 2000, Russia's media and culture industry had enjoyed nearly a decade of almost unrestricted freedom and yet, by the time he launched his illegal invasion of Ukraine in 2022, Russia's independent media was crushed, while the few viable opposition figures were either imprisoned, exiled, or dead under mysterious circumstances."
- The following three books are an unofficial series which the author titled Russia's Alien Nations. Before printing, the author serialized them in his blog.
  - 2023:Soviet-Self-Hatred: The Secret Identities of Postsocialism in Contemporary Russia
  - 2024: Unstuck in Time: On the Post-Soviet Uncanny
    The book is about Soviet nostalgia in Russian literary fiction. Cornell University Press offers a free e-book online. The title of the book comes from Kurt Vonnegut's Slaughterhouse-Five: "Billy Pilgrim has come unstuck in time. Billy has gone to sleep a senile widower and awakened on his wedding day. He has walked through a door in 1955 and come out another one in 1941."
  - TBA: The author announced the future title, Unidentified Russian Objects: On Soviet Melancholy, which Borenstein is updating weekly.

== Honors ==
- 2009 Guggenheim Fellowship.
- 1999: Fulbright Fellowship
- 1999, 2005: Golden Dozen Teaching Awards
