= Heldt Prize =

The Heldt Prize is a literary award from the Association for Women in Slavic Studies named in honor of Barbara Heldt. The award has been given variously in the following categories:

- Best book in Slavic/Eastern European/Eurasian Women's Studies
- Best Book by a Woman in Any Area of Slavic/Eastern European/Eurasian Studies
- Best Translation by a Woman in Any Area of Slavic/Eastern European/Eurasian Studies
- Best article in Slavic/Eastern European/Eurasian Women's studies

Christine Worobec is the only twice recipient of the award.

== Best Book recipients ==
- 2022: Jadwiga Biskupska. Survivors: Warsaw under the Nazi Occupation. Cambridge University Press, 2022.
- 2022: Katalin Fábián, Janet Elise Johnson, and Mara Lazda. Routledge Handbook of Gender in Central-Eastern Europe and Eurasia. (Routledge, 2021)
- 2021: Francine Hirsch. Soviet Judgment at Nuremberg: A New History of the International Military Tribunal after World War II (Oxford University Press, 2020)
- 2021: Allison Leigh, Picturing Russia’s Men: Masculinity and Modernity in 19th-Century Painting (Bloomsbury, 2020)
- 2020: Jennifer J. Carroll, Narkomania: Drugs, HIV, and Citizenship in Ukraine (Cornell University Press, 2019)
- 2020: Olga Peters Hasty, How Women Must Write: Inventing the Russian Woman Poet (Northwestern University Press, 2019)
- 2019: Kateřina Lišková, Sexual Liberation, Socialist Style: Communist Czechoslovakia and the Science of Desire, 1945-1989 (Cambridge University Press, 2018)
- 2019: Hannah Pollin-Galay, Ecologies of Witnessing: Language, Place, and Holocaust Testimony (Yale University Press, 2018)
- 2018: Edyta Materka, Dystopia's Provocateurs: Peasants, State, and Informality in the Polish-German Borderlands. Bloomington: Indiana University Press, 2017
- 2017: Iveta Jusová & Jiřina Šiklová, eds. Czech Feminisms: Perspectives on Gender in East Central Europe (Bloomington: Indiana University Press, 2016)
- 2017: Rebecca Gould, Writers and Rebels: The Literature of Insurgency in the Caucasus (New Haven, CT: Yale University Press, 2016)
- 2016: Lisa Kirschenbaum, International Communism and the Spanish Civil War: Solidarity and Suspicion (Cambridge: Cambridge University Press, 2015)
- 2016: Keely Stauter-Halsted. The Devil's Chain: Prostitution and Social Control in Partitioned Poland (Ithaca, NY: Cornell University Press, 2015)
- 2015: Luba Golburt, The First Epoch: The Eighteenth Century and the Russian Cultural Imagination (Madison: University of Wisconsin Press, 2014)
- 2015: Valerie Sperling, Sex, Politics, and Putin: Political Legitimacy in Russia (New York: Oxford University Press, 2015)
- 2014: Jenny Kaminer, Women with a Thirst for Destruction: The Bad Mother in Russian Culture. (Evanston, IL: Northwestern University Press, 2013)
- 2014: Kate Brown. Plutopia: Nuclear Families, Atomic Cities, and the Great Soviet and American Plutonium Disasters (Oxford: Oxford University Press, 2013)
- 2013: Karen Petrone, The Great War in Russian Memory (Bloomington: Indiana University, 2011)
- 2013: Judith Pallot and Laura Piacentini, with the assistance of Dominique Moran, Gender, Geography, and Punishment. The Experience of Women in Carceral Russia (New York: Oxford University Press, 2012)
- 2012: Gail Kligman and Katherine Verdery, Peasants under Siege. The Collectivization of Romanian Agriculture, 1949-1962 (Princeton, NJ: Princeton University Press, 2011)
- 2012: Beth Holmgren, Starring Madame Modjeska: On Tour in Poland and America (Bloomington: Indiana University, 2012)
- 2011: Cristina Vatulescu, Police Aesthetics: Literature, Film & the Secret Police in Soviet Times (Stanford University Press, 2010)
- 2010: Kristen Ghodsee, Muslim Lives in Eastern Europe: Gender, Ethnicity and the Transformation of Islam in Postsocialist Bulgaria (Princeton University Press, 2010)
- 2010: Rebecca Manley, To the Tashkent Station: Evacuation and Survival in the Soviet Union at War, (Cornell University Press, 2009)
- 2009: Christine Ruane, The Empire's New Clothes: A History of the Russian Fashion Industry, 1700–1917, (Yale University Press, 2009)
- 2009: Olga Shevchenko, Crisis and the Everyday in Postsocialist Moscow, (Indiana University Press, 2009)
- 2008: Catherine Wanner, Communities of the Converted: Ukrainians and Global Evangelism (Cornell University Press, 2007)
- 2008: Eliot Borenstein, Overkill: Sex and Violence in Contemporary Russian Popular Culture (Cornell University Press, 2007)
- 2007: Valerie Kivelson, Cartographies of Tsardom, The Land and Its Meaning traces (Ithaca, NY: Cornell University Press, 2007)
- 2007: Marianne Kamp, The New Woman in Uzbekistan: Islam, Modernity, and Unveiling under Communism (Seattle, Washington: University of Washington Press, 2007)
- 2006: Marci Shore, Caviar and Ashes: A Warsaw Generation's Life and Death in Marxism, 1918-1968 (Yale University Press, 2006)
- 2006: Michele Rivkin-Fish, Women's Health in Post-Soviet Russia: The Politics of Intervention (Indian University Press, 2005)
- 2005: Shana Penn, Solidarity's Secret: The Women who Defeated Communism in Poland (University of Michigan Press, 2005)
- 2005: Amy Nelson (2004) "Music for the Revolution: Musicians and Power in Early Soviet Russia" ISBN 978-0-271-02369-4
- 2003: Paula Michaels, Curative Powers: Medicine and Empire in Stalin's Central Asia (University of Pittsburgh Press, 2003)
- 2001: Christine Worobec, "Possessed: Women, Witches, and Demons in Imperial Russia"
- 2000: Nadieszda Kizenko (2000) "A Prodigal Saint: Father John of Kronstadt and the Russian People" ISBN 978-0-271-01975-8 (hardcover), ISBN 978-0-271-01976-5 (paperback) (review)
- 1995: Irina Livezeanu "Cultural Politics in Greater Romania: Regionalism, Nation Building, and Ethnic Struggle, 1918–1930" (Cornell University Press, 1995 and 2000 ISBN 0-8014-8688-2)
- 1991: Christine Worobec, "Peasant Russia: Family and Community in the Post-Emancipation Period"
