= North American Association of Teachers of Polish =

Professional organization

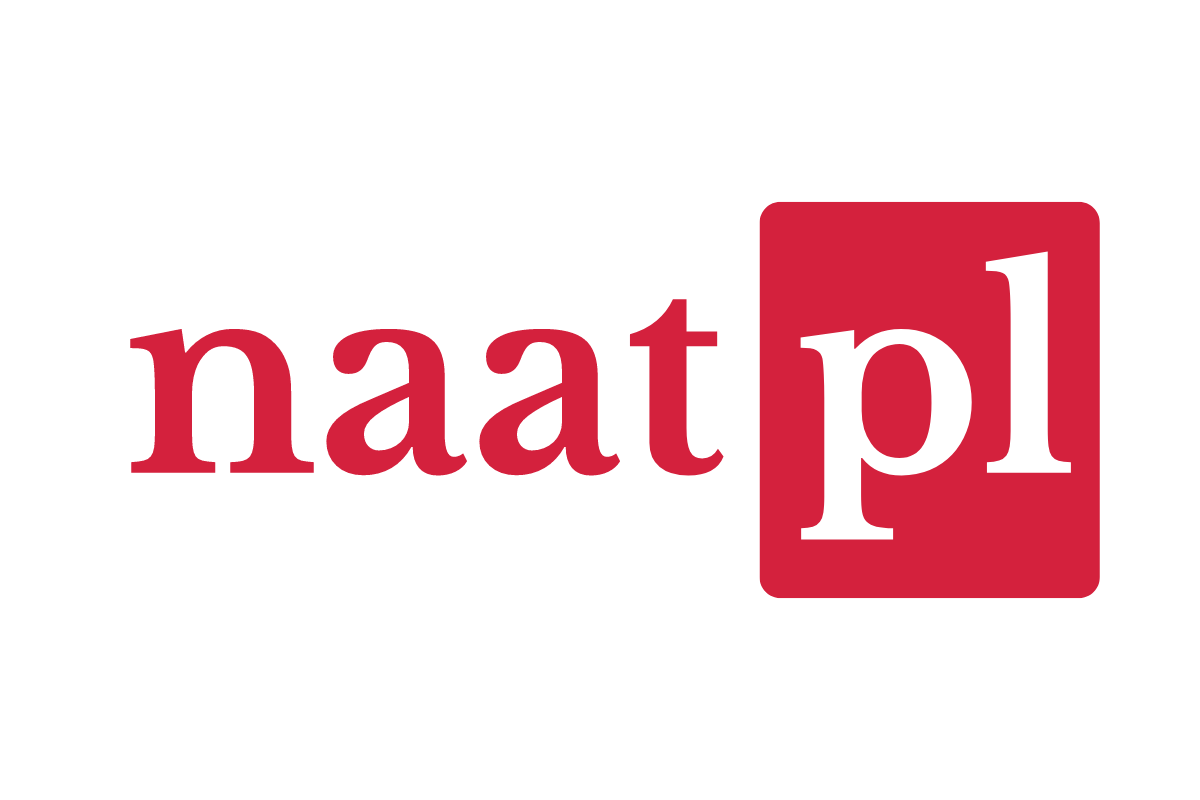
North American Association of Teachers of Polish (NAATPl) logo

North American Association of Teachers of Polish (NAATPl) is a professional organization established by Polish language instructors and teachers in North America to promote the teaching, learning, and research of Polish as a second language. Among its main objectives are increasing the visibility of Polish language programs and centers in North America, fostering professional development among Polish as a foreign language professionals, encouraging research in Polish language pedagogy, providing a shared forum for experiences and ideas, and organizing Polish language events such as panels, roundtables, and workshops. NAATPl was founded in May 2015 and, as an affiliate of the American Association of Teachers of Slavic and East European Languages (AATSEEL), holds its annual general meetings in conjunction with AATSEEL conferences.

== Leadership ==
NAATPl founding member Ewa Małachowska-Pasek (University of Michigan) served as the association's Acting President from 2015 to 2016 and as President from 2018 to 2019. She was succeeded in the interim by Kinga Kosmala (University of Chicago, Northwestern University), who was re-elected as President in 2017. In 2020, Izolda Wolski-Moskoff (The Ohio State University, University of Illinois Chicago) was elected President, followed by Krzysztof E. Borowski (University of Wisconsin–Madison) in 2024 who was re-elected in 2025.

== Professional activity ==
Since its founding, the North American Association of Teachers of Polish has organized multiple events for Polish language professionals, including in-person professional development workshops at the University of Chicago (2015), the University of Michigan (2017), and Northwestern University (2019).

The first workshop in the series, titled Strategies for Building a Successful Polish Language Program, marked the association's founding moment. The 2017 workshop, Teaching with Authentic Materials: Theoretical and Practical Classroom Implications, attracted 27 Polish language teachers from secondary and higher education institutions. Its program included several presentations, two hands-on sessions on creating interactive videos and using TV series in foreign language teaching, and a poster session. The 2019 workshop, organized by Northwestern University and the University of Illinois Chicago, was held under the theme Standard-Based Approaches to Teaching Polish Language.

Beyond workshops, the association has also organized webinars on Polish language pedagogy, conference panels at ASEEES and AATSEEL annual meetings, competitions for best Polish teaching materials, and a Slavic and East European Journal article forum.

In 2019, the North American Association of Teachers of Polish was among the language education organizations that signed the American Academy of Arts and Sciences Bridging America’s Language Gap petition, which called for "greater support for languages in order to maintain and enhance American global leadership."

== See also ==
- Polish language in the United States
- Polish studies
- American Association of Teachers of Slavic and East European Languages
- Association for Slavic, East European, and Eurasian Studies
- Slavic and East European Journal
- Slavic studies
