= Joan Neuberger =

American historian

Joan Neuberger is an American historian. She obtained a bachelor's degree in Russian literature at Grinnell College in 1975, and a doctorate in Russian history at Stanford University at 1985. She now teaches at the University of Texas at Austin, where she focuses on 19th- and 20th-century Russian/Soviet history, with a special interest in the history of cinema and other visual cultures.

Neuberger's publications include:

- Hooliganism: Crime and Culture in St Petersburg, 1900-1914 (1993)
- Ivan the Terrible: The Film Companion (2003)
- Europe and the Making of Modernity, 1815-1914 (with Robin Winks, 2005)
- This Thing of Darkness: Eisenstein's Ivan the Terrible in Stalin's Russia (2019) (nominated for the Pushkin Book Prize)

She has also co-edited the following anthologies:

- Imitations of Life: Melodrama in Russia (with Louise McReynolds, 2001)
- Picturing Russia: Explorations in Visual Culture (with Valerie Kivelson, 2008)
- Everyday Life in Russian History: Quotidian Studies in Honor of Daniel Kaiser (with Gary Marker, Marshall Poe, Susan Rupp, 2010)
- The Flying Carpet: Studies on Eisenstein and Russian Cinema in Honor of Naum Kleiman (with Antonio Somaini, 2017)

She is the founding editor of the history website Not Even Past, and co-founder of the podcast 15 Minute History.
