= Mervyn Matthews =

British Sovietologist and writer

William Haydn Mervyn Matthews (July 25, 1932 – November 26, 2017) was a British expert on Soviet society, writer, and broadcaster.

He was born in Swansea and his early years are described in his 2002 memoir Mervyn's Lot. He took a degree in Russian at Manchester University, then moved to St Catherine's College, Oxford, then St Antony's College for work on his Ph.D.

Falling in love with his future wife from the Soviet Union cost him his career. He was accepted as a research fellow at Moscow University, but expelled from the Soviet Union in 1964 for "anti-Soviet propaganda and speculation". (Note: спекуляция ("speculation") is a Russian term for profiteering. This refers to an episode when KGB caught Matthews when he tried to sell a sweater to a friend.) St Antony's College annulled his research fellowship for political troublemaking, after which he moved to the University of Nottingham. He eventually settled as reader in the University of Surrey's linguistic and regional studies department.

== Books ==
- 1972: Class and Society in Soviet Russia
- 1978: Privilege in the Soviet Union: A Study of Elite Life-Styles Under Communism
- 1982: Education in the Soviet Union: Policies and Institutions Since Stalin
- 1986: Poverty in the Soviet Union: The Life-styles of the Underprivileged in Recent Years
- 1989: Patterns of Deprivation in the Soviet Union Under Brezhnev and Gorbachev
- 1993: The Passport Society: Controlling Movement In Russia And The USSR
- 2008: Mother Russia: A thrilling tale of crooks, corpses and Penclawdd cockles
- (ed.) Soviet government: A selection of official documents on internal policies
- (ed.)Soviet Sociology, 1964-75: A Bibliography
- (ed.)Party, State and Citizen in the Soviet Union: A Collection of Documents
- Trilogy of memoirs
  - Mervyn's Lot, "covered his troubled boyhood in war-torn Swansea of the thirties and forties"
  - Mila and Mervusya, "recounts the gripping tale of his extraordinary adventures with the KGB in Khrushchev's Russia during the Cold War"
  - Mervyn's Russia: A memoir of Russia, "his life in Pimlico with a colorful Russian wife Ludmila, following their marriage under the shadow of Lenin's statue in the Moscow Palace of Weddings in 1969; his return visits to the new, post-Soviet Russia and the many unusual Russians he met"

== Family ==
Matthews is the father of Owen Matthews, a British expert on Soviet society. His wife was Lyudmila Bibikova, born in Kharkiv, Soviet Ukraine. Their relationship across the "Iron Curtain" holds a notable place in Anglo-Soviet relations in the 1960s. It was explored by Owen in Stalin’s Children and by Mervyn in Mila and Mervusya.

Bibikova's father, Boris Bibikov, was a Communist Party official and was executed in 1937.
