= Alfred Rieber =

American historian (1931–2025)

Alfred J. Rieber (1931 – September 9, 2025) was an American historian specializing in Russian and Soviet history.

== Biography ==
He graduated magna cum laude from Colgate University, where he was a member of Phi Beta Kappa. He obtained his MA (1954) and PhD (1959) from the Russian Institute at Columbia University. He wrote his doctoral thesis on Joseph Stalin and the French Communist Party in the 1940s.

He has taught at numerous prestigious institutions, including Northwestern University, the University of Chicago, the University of Pennsylvania, Columbia University, and the Central European University in Budapest, Hungary. He taught at the University of Pennsylvania for 30 years and was chair of the history department for ten years. He also taught for more than two decades at the Central European University (CEU), again chairing the history department for four years. He won several teaching awards throughout his career for excellence in teaching.

As a historian, he has published widely in the field of Russian and Soviet history. Among his notable books are Struggle for the Eurasian Borderlands: From the Rise of Early Modern Empires to the End of the First World War (Cambridge, 2014) which won the Bentley Prize of the World History Association and its sequel Stalin's Struggle for Supremacy in Eurasia (Cambridge, 2016) which was shortlisted for the Pushkin Book Prize.

Rieber has also written three historical detective novels: To Kill a Tsar (2010); The Kiev Killings (2013); and Siberian Secrets (2014), all published by the New Academia Press.

Rieber died on September 9, 2025, at the age of 94.

== Bibliography ==
- Rieber, A. J. (1962). Stalin and the French Communist Party 1941—1947. New York: Columbia University Press.
- Rieber, A. J., & Nelson, R. C. (1966). A Study of the U.S.S.R. and Communism: An Historical Approach by Alfred J. Rieber and Robert C. Nelson. Chicago: Scott, Foresman.
- Rieber, A. J., & Nelson, R. C. (1964). The USSR and Communism: Source Readings and Interpretations. Chicago: Scott, Foresman.
- Bari︠a︡tinskiĭ, A. I., & Rieber, A. J. (1966). The Politics of Autocracy: Letters of Alexander II to Prince A.I. Bariatinskii, 1857-1864. Paris: Mouton.
- Rieber, A. J. (1983). Social Foundations of the Russian Bureaucracy in the Twentieth Century: Final report to National Council for Soviet and East European Research. Washington, D.C: National Council for Soviet and East European Research.
- Rieber, A. J. (1987). The Cold War as Civil War. Washington, D.C: National Council for Soviet and East European Research.
- Presni︠a︡kov, A. E., Moorhouse, A. E., & Rieber, A. J. (1993). The Formation of the Great Russian State: A Study of Russian History in the Thirteenth to Fifteenth Centuries. Gulf Breeze, FL: Academic International Press.
- Rieber, A. J. (1995). Zhdanov in Finland. Pittsburgh, PA: Center for Russian and East European Studies, University of Pittsburgh.
- Rieber, A.J. (2001). From Reform to Empire: Russia's “New” Political History. Kritika: Explorations in Russian and Eurasian History. 2(2), pp. 261–268.
- Rieber, A.J. (2003). Civil Wars in the Soviet Union. Kritika: Explorations in Russian and Eurasian History. 4(1), pp. 129–162.
- Rieber, A. J. (2003). Changing Concepts and Constructions of Frontiers: A Comparative Historical Approach. Ab Imperio. (1), pp. 23–46.
- Rieber, A. J., & Siefert, M. (2003). Extending the Borders of Russian History: Essays in Honor of Alfred J. Rieber. Budapest: Central European University Press.
- Rieber, A.J. (2006). The Problem of Social Cohesion. Kritika: Explorations in Russian and Eurasian History 7(3), pp. 599–608.
- Rieber, A. J. (2010). Merchants and Entrepreneurs in Imperial Russia. Chapel Hill: University of North Carolina Press.
- Rieber, A. J. (2013). Forced Migration in Central and Eastern Europe, 1939-1950. Hoboken: Taylor and Francis.
- Rieber, A. J. (2013). Salami Tactics Revisited: The Hungarian Communists on the Road to Power. Trondheim: NTNU.
- Rieber, A. J. (2014). A Tale of Three Genres: History, Fiction, and the Historical Detektiv. Kritika: Explorations in Russian and Eurasian History. 15(2), pp. 353–363.
- Rieber, A. J. (2014). The Struggle for the Eurasian Borderlands: From the Rise of Early Modern Empires to the End of the First World War. Cambridge: Cambridge University Press.
- Rieber, A.J. (2015). Struggle over the Borderlands. Kritika: Explorations in Russian and Eurasian History. 16(4), pp. 951–959.
- Rieber, A. J. (2015). Stalin and the Struggle for Supremacy in Eurasia. Cambridge: Cambridge University Press.
- Rieber, A. J., & Rubinstein, A. Z. (2016). Perestroika at the Crossroads. London: Routledge.
- Rieber, A., & Kotsonis, Y. (2018). The Imperial Russian Project: Autocratic Politics, Economic Development, and Social Fragmentation. Toronto: University of Toronto Press.
- Rieber, A. J. (2022). Stalin as Warlord. New Haven and London: Yale University Press.
- Rieber, A. J. (2022). Storms Over the Balkans During World War II. Oxford, UK: Oxford University Press. ISBN 978-0-19-285803-0

Articles about Alfred Rieber

- Wortman, Richard. (2020). Myriad Designs and Legacies of Regret: Alfred J. Rieber's Early Articles. Kritika: Explorations in Russian and Eurasian History, 21(1), pp. 127–158.
