= Bobo Lo =

Chinese Australian writer and foreign policy expert

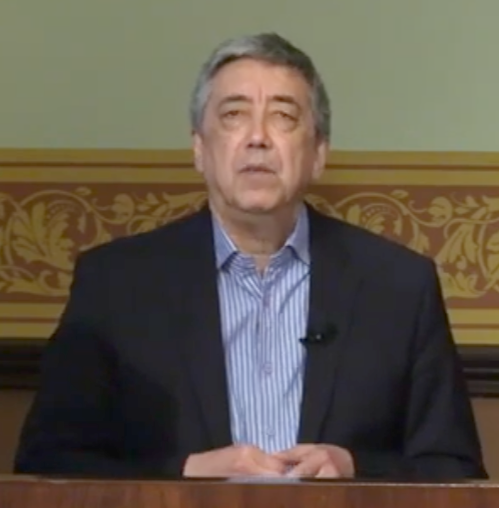
- At a Lowy Institute event in 2022
- Born: 1959 (age 66–67)
- Education: University of Oxford (MA); University of Melbourne (PhD)
- Occupations: Writer; foreign policy expert

Bobo Lo (Chinese: 罗波波; born 1959) is a Chinese Australian writer and foreign policy expert. He received his MA from Oxford University and his PhD from the University of Melbourne. From 1995 to 1999, he served as a diplomat in Moscow, as First Secretary then Deputy Head of Mission, at the Australian Embassy. From 2005 to 2008, he headed the Russia and Eurasia Programme at Chatham House in London. Then, from 2008 to 2009, he was Director of the Russia and China programme at the Centre for European Reform.

He has written extensively on Russian and Chinese foreign policy. His book Russia and the New World Disorder was nominated for the 2016 Pushkin House Prize, and described by The Economist as the ‘best attempt yet to explain Russia’s unhappy relationship with the rest of the world’.

== Selected works ==
- Soviet Labour Ideology and the Collapse of the State (2000)
- Russian Foreign Policy in the Post-Soviet Era: Reality, Illusion and Mythmaking (2002)
- Vladimir Putin and the Evolution of Russian Foreign Policy (2003)
- China and Russia: Common interests, contrasting perceptions (2006)
- Axis of Convenience: Moscow, Beijing, and the New Geopolitics (2008)
- Russia and the New World Disorder (2015)
- The Disorderly Society: Rethinking Global Governance for the Twenty-First Century (2025)
