= Eleonory Gilburd =

American historian

Eleonory Gilburd is an American historian of Russia and the Soviet Union. She studied at the University of Chicago and at UC Berkeley. She specializes in Soviet history and culture, with a focus on the era of the Khrushchev Thaw. Her first book To See Paris and Die received critical acclaim and was nominated for the Pushkin Book Prize. It also won several academic prizes in the field of Slavic studies. Gilburd received the Quantrell Award in 2025.
