= Christine Worobec =

American historian

Christine D. Worobec (born 1955) is an American social and cultural historian. She is a Distinguished Research Professor Emerita of Northern Illinois University, with interests in Russian and Ukrainian women's history, family history, and rural history.

== Career ==
Worobec earned her BA (1977), MA (1978), and PhD (1984) degrees in history at the University of Toronto.

During 1984-1999 she was employed at Kent State University and she has worked at Northern Illinois University since 1999.

Worobec has collaborated on the reference work Women and Gender in Central and Eastern Europe, Russia, and Eurasia: A Comprehensive Bibliography, and the edited essay collection Russia’s Women: Accommodation, Resistance, Transformation.

Her current research project examines Orthodox pilgrimages in Russia, Ukraine, and Belarus since 1700.

== Monographs ==
- Peasant Russia: Family and Community in Post-Emancipation Russia (1991)
- Possessed: Women, Witches, and Demons (2001)

== Awards ==
- American Association for Ukrainian Studies' 2017 Article Prize
- 2017 ASEEES Distinguished Contributions Award
- 2008 AWSS Outstanding Achievement Award for her service as president, vice president, and board member of the AWSS
- Her 1991 and 2001 monographs won the Heldt Prize.
