= Vladislav M. Zubok =

Professor of international history

- Владислав М. Зубок
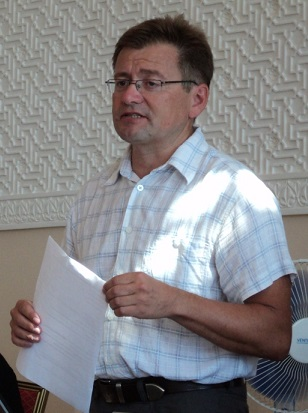
- Zubok in 2010
- Born: April 16, 1958 (age 68); Moscow, Soviet Union

Academic background
- Education: Moscow State University; Institute for US and Canadian Studies

Academic work
- Discipline: History
- Sub-discipline: Cold War
- Institutions: National Security Archive, Amherst College, Ohio University, Stanford University, University of Michigan, Temple University, Foreign Policy Research Institute, London School of Economics

Vladislav Martinovich Zubok (Russian: Владислав Мартинович Зубок; born 16 April 1958) is a Russian academic and professor of international history at the London School of Economics and a Head of the Сold War Studies Programme in the Department of International History. Zubok is a specialist in the history of the Cold War and 20th century Russia, who wrote such books as A Failed Empire: the Soviet Union in the Cold War from Stalin to Gorbachev (2007) and Zhivago’s Children: the Last Russian Intelligentsia (2009).

== Early life ==
He was born and educated in Moscow. He received his undergraduate degree at Moscow State University in 1980, and his PhD at the Institute for the US and Canada in 1985.

== Career ==
Zubok became a fellow at the National Security Archive, a non-government organization at the George Washington University from 1994 till 2001. He has been a visiting professor at Amherst College, Ohio University, Stanford University, and the University of Michigan, and in 2004 he became a tenured professor at Temple University.

He also was a director of the Russian and East European Document Database Project of the National Security Archive, George Washington University and Cold War International History Project, Woodrow Wilson International Center for Scholars, Washington D.C., funded by Smith Richardson Foundation, where he created an English language catalogue of newly available documentation from 1996 till 2001.

Zubok is a senior fellow of The Hertog Program in Grand Strategy at the Foreign Policy Research Institute.

For his books he received the Lionel Gelber Prize and the Marshall Shulman Prize of the Association for Slavic, East European, and Eurasian Studies.

He has also received grants from the MacArthur Foundation, Carnegie Corporation of New York, the Yeltsin Center and the Russkiy Mir Foundation.

He was a consultant on documentary series such as CNN's twenty-four part series Cold War first broadcast in 1998.

== Selected publications ==
- Inside the Kremlin's Cold War, From Stalin to Khrushchev. Harvard University Press, 1996. ISBN 9780807830987, OCLC 226044981
- A Failed Empire: the Soviet Union in the Cold War from Stalin to Gorbachev. University of North Carolina Press, 2007. OCLC 740788529
- Zhivago's Children: the Last Russian Intelligentsia. Harvard University Press, 2009. ISBN 9780674062320, OCLC 949194466
- Masterpieces of History: A Peaceful End of the Cold War in Europe, 1989. Central European University Press, 2010. (editor with Svetlana Savranskaia and Thomas Blanton)
- Società totalitarie e transizione alla democrazia. il Mulino, Bologna, 2011. (Editor with Tommaso Piffer).
- Дмитрий Лихачев. Жизнь и век. Вита-Нова, 2016.
- The idea of Russia: the life and work of Dmitry Likhachev, London; New York: I.B. Tauris & Co. Ltd, 2017. ISBN 9781784537272, OCLC 972200954
- "The Making of a Russian Cold War Historian during the Last Years of the Soviet Union" (Nov. 2021) online, autobiography
- Collapse: The Fall of the Soviet Union. Yale University Press, 2021. ISBN 978-0300257304
- The World of the Cold War, 1945–1991. Pelican, 2025, ISBN 978-0-241-69614-9.
