= Victoria Lomasko =

Russian graphic artist (born 1978)

- Виктория Валентиновна Ломаско
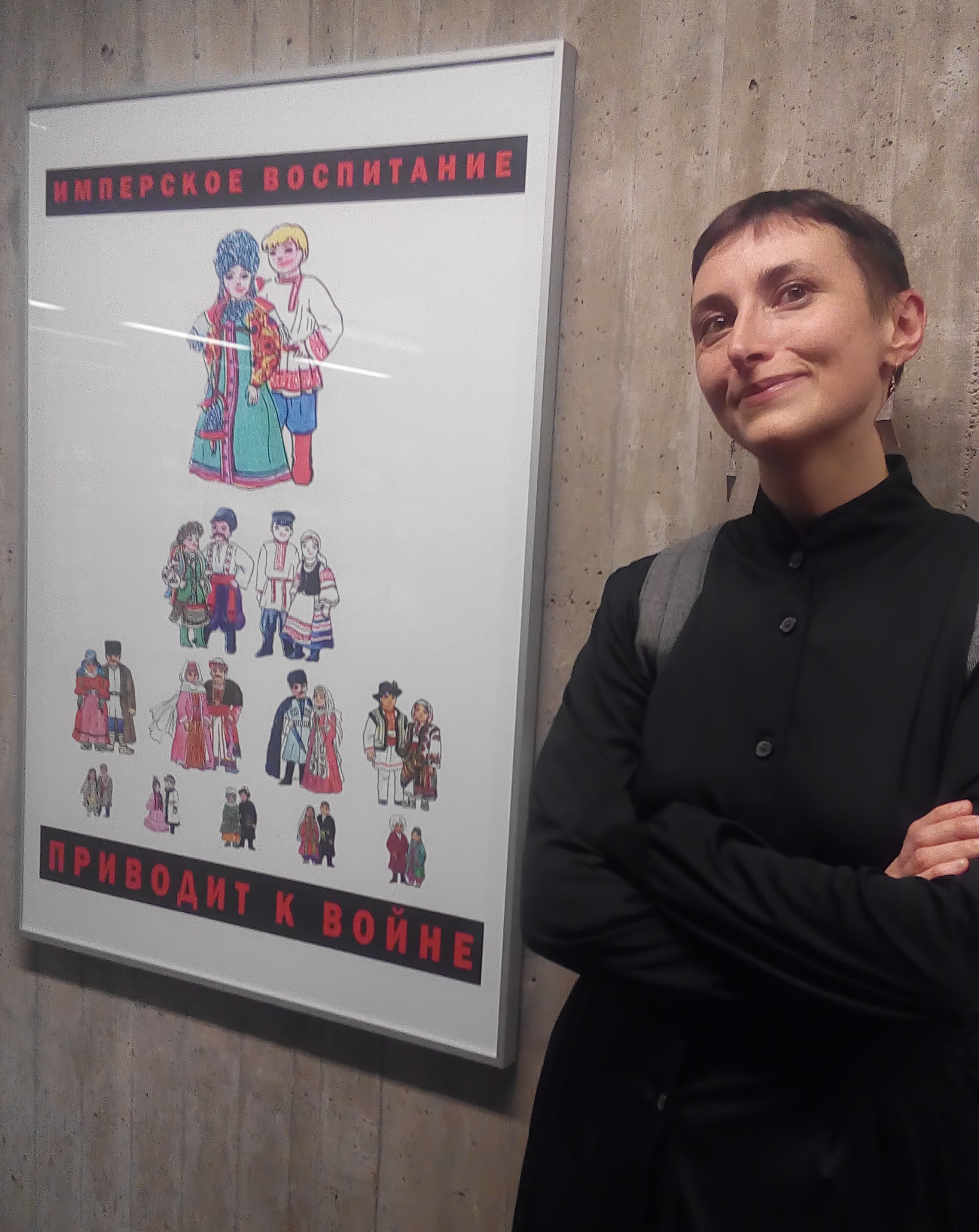
- Victoria Lomasko in 2017
- Born: 1978 (age 47–48); Serpukhov, Russia
- Education: BA in Book Design and Graphic Art
- Alma mater: Moscow State University of Printing Arts
- Known for: graphic journalism, graphic novels, murals
- Awards: 2018 Pushkin House Prize for Best Book in Translation

Victoria Valentinovna Lomasko (Russian: Виктория Валентиновна Ломаско) is a Russian graphic artist who was born in Serpukhov, Russia in 1978 Her work focuses on graphic reportage through the means of murals and graphic art in literature. To create her work, Lomasko travels throughout the former Soviet Union and spends time with those who are rarely represented in the media. She was working and living in Moscow until Russia's invasion of Ukraine.

== Early life ==
Lomasko was born in Serpukhov, Russia in 1978. Her father worked as an agitprop artist at a secretive metal-worker factory. At 19 years old she moved to Moscow and attended Moscow State University of Printing Arts, where she graduated in 2003 and received her bachelor's degree in book design and graphic art. She also took classes at the Moscow Institute of Contemporary Art.

== Volunteer work ==
Lomasko visited Mozhaysk Juvenile Prison for the first time in August 2010 as a volunteer for the Center for Prison Reform. During her visits there, she taught the inmates to draw. She continued to teach drawing classes at girl's penitentiaries in Novy Oskol and Ryazan, and the boy's penitentiary in Aleskin until 2014. All the work that was created during the lessons was collected and is currently housed at the Museo Nacional Centro de Arte Reina Sofía in Madrid.

== Career 2010-present ==
=== 2010 ===
In 2010 Lomasko co-curated the art exhibition called Drawing the Court with Zlata Ponirovska at Gelabert Studios Gallery in New York.

That same year she co-authored the book titled The Provinces in collaboration with former political journalist Anton Nikolayev. The book was inspired by a trip to the provinces on which they went. She went on to co-author a second book with Nikolayev titled Forbidden Art. The book is a 158-page documentary graphic novel that documents the legal trial of the organizers of the Forbidden Art 2006 exhibition that was held at Andrei Sakharov Museum in Moscow in 2007. Forbidden Art was published by Boomkniga Publishers in St. Petersburg and was nominated for the 2010 "Media Art Project of the Year" Kandinsky Prize.

=== 2012 ===
In 2012, Lomasko's drawings began to be exhibited in Moscow, St. Petersburg, and all over Europe. She participated in shows like "Occupy Abay". Around the same time, she collaborated with Nadia Plungian to curate The Feminist Pencil, an exhibit that showcased mostly Russian women's graphic art. The first Feminist Pencil took place at a hostel in Moscow called Fabrika and featured only 6 artists.The pair continued working together and in 2013 produced The Feminist Pencil 2, which was shown in St. Petersburg, Oslo, and Berlin.

At the time of Putin's reelection, it had become incredibly difficult for Lomasko to publish and show her work in Russia. At this time, a feminist group in Kyrgyzstan invited her to Bishkek to teach a workshop. In the following years, she traveled to places such as Dagestan, Georgia, and Armenia, producing a series of work that explored these places.

=== 2016 ===
In 2016 Lomasko produced a solo exhibition, Feminist Travels which was exhibited at the Goethe Institute in Tbilisi, Georgia.

=== 2017 ===
In 2017 Lomasko created two solo exhibitions that were shown in The United States. The first, Other Russias: Angry, was displayed at the Ellis Gallery, in Carnegie Mellon University in collaboration with the University of Pittsburgh while Unwanted Women was displayed at the Ortega Y Gasset Art Projects in Brooklyn, New York.

Lomasko also created an exhibition titled The Daughter of an Artist Decorator which was displayed at The Arts Centre HOME in Manchester, UK.

A collection of Lomasko's work was published in March 2017 by the Brooklyn publishing house n+1 as Other Russias. It is her first English book (translated by Thomas Campbell) and the first time her work has been collected. In June 2017, it was republished by Penguin UK and has been translated into multiple languages, including German and French. The 320-page book consists of two sections: the first section, Invisible, focuses on the experiences of marginalized groups prior to the 2012 protests. In Lomasko's own words "Invisible contains stories about juvenile prison wards, teachers and pupils at rural schools, migrant workers, old people seeking refuge in Russian Orthodoxy, sex workers, and single women in the Russian hinterlands." The second section, Angry focuses on the Russian political opposition parties from 2012 to 2016. In Lomasko's own words "Angry chronicles people's attempts to come together and take back their voice and rights from the state. It includes reports of the large opposition rallies that took place in Moscow in 2012 and the subsequent trials of protesters; the LGBT community's efforts to stay visible despite the government's adoption of homophobic laws; and protests by national and local grassroots "pressure groups" in 2015 and 2016." Later in 2017, Lomasko embarked on a U.S. book tour to support the release of her book. The English version of Other Russias won the 2018 Pushkin House Russian Book Prize for Best Book in Translation.

=== 2018 ===
In 2018 Lomasko produced two solo exhibitions that were displayed in the United Kingdom. The first titled Apparition of the Last Soviet Artist was shown at GRAD, Somerset House in London, and the second titled On the Eve was shown at the Pushkin House also located in London.

Lomasko also created an exhibition titled Our Post-Soviet Land which was displayed at Edith-Russ-Haus for Media Art, in Oldenburg, Germany.

=== 2019 ===
In 2019 Lomasko created a collection of murals titled Atlases which was done at The Havighurst Center for East European, Russian and Eurasian Studies, at Miami University in Oxford, Ohio, USA.

She went on to create another collection of murals titled Separated World which was done at Edel Assanti in London, UK.

The next mural she created was titled Grandma's Garden, which was done at CartoonMuseum in Basel, Switzerland.

The following work Lomasko created was a diptych, which was done at The Dartmouth Russian Department in Hanover, New Hampshire, USA.

=== 2021 ===
Lomasko wrote The Last Soviet Artist book, filmmaker Geraint Rhys made a documentary about her while in Moscow. In June 2025, she gave an interview to Industrial Worker magazine about the book. During the conversation, Lomasko also shared her political activism against the Russian and Belarusian governments, as well as stories from her personal life.

=== 2022 ===
After the start of the Russian invasion of Ukraine, Lomasko fled Russia for Brussels, Belgium. This period coincided with promotion of her latest book in Europe and an exhibit based on it in Brescia, Italy, as part of Brescia's Festival For Peace.

== Books ==
- The Provinces - 2010
- Forbidden Art - 2010
- Other Russias - 2017
- The Last Soviet Artist - 2021

== Work in public collections and magazines ==
Lomasko's work can also be found in public collections at the Museo Nacional Centro de Arte Reina Sofía in Madrid, Spain; National Center of Contemporary Art in Moscow, Russia; the Arsenal Gallery in Bialystok, Poland, but also Manchester, Brescia, and Angoulême. Her work has also been featured in magazines such as Russian Art and Culture, The Guardian, Art in America, and The New Yorker.
