= Starring Madame Modjeska =

2011 biography by Beth Holmgren

- Author: Beth Holmgren
- Published: 2011
- Publisher: Indiana University Press
- Publication date: November 20, 2011
- ISBN: 978-0-253-35664-2
- OCLC: 823762289

Starring Madame Modjeska: On Tour in Poland and America is a 2011 biography by Beth Holmgren about the Polish actress Helena Modjeska. From a young age, Modjeska's interest in performing was shaped by her brothers and by a tutor who introduced the family to the works of great writers. Eventually, Modjeska would be acknowledged as a reigning star in Poland, and be equally celebrated when she toured America. Holmgren is Professor and Chair of the Department of Slavic and Eurasian Studies, Duke University. She is also on the faculty of the university's Gender/Sexuality/Feminist Studies, Jewish Studies, and Theater Studies. Prior to the publication of this book, she had written articles on Modjeska for The Polish Review, Indiana Slavic Studies and Theatre Journal.

== Synopsis ==
Holmgren begins Starring Madame Modjeska: On Tour in Poland and America with Helena Modjeska's 1877 American debut at San Francisco's California Theatre, before flashing back to her Polish roots. The future thespian was born as Jadwiga Benda in 1840, into a bourgeoise family in Kraków, Poland, who fell on hard times. Her great-grandfather, Antoni Goltz, was a royal senior overseer at the coal mine of the last king of Poland in Szczakowa in the late 18th century. Helena's grandfather, Karol Misel (Müzel), a mining engineer, died in the Wieliczka salt mine while trying to rescue trapped workers. After his death, Helena's grandmother, Katarzyna Goltz, married Franciszek Bruckner, a government official from the noble Bruckner family, leaving Helena's mother, Józefa, to be raised by relatives. Józefa later married Szymon Benda, a wealthy and ennobled Kraków merchant devoted to public service and civic generosity. Widowed young, Helena's mother lost two townhouses in the Great Fire of Kraków (July 18–28, 1850) and was left to support her children by running a family café, which survived the blaze. Her mother Józefa Misel Benda was a widowed head of the household when Helena was born, and the mother of sons Józef, Szymon, and Feliks. Baptized as Helena Opid, the identity of her birth father remains speculative, but Michał Opid became Józefa's husband after Helena's birth, and he is the man she acknowledged as her father. Through Michal Opid, she had a sister Józefa and brother Adolph. Helena and sister Józefa were educated at St. John's convent in Kraków . She shared the thespian aspirations of her brothers.

Józef introduced 25-year-old stage actor Gustaw (or Gustave) Zimajer to the family when Helena was about age 10. The author portrays him as a dubious character. His stage name was Gustaw Modrzejewska (or Modrzejewski). Hired as a family German language tutor, he often read to them from that era's great works of literature. When she married Zimajer, Helena adapted his stage name to Modjeska (or Modjeski) for her stage persona. He served as her talent manager for her 1861 professional debut in Bochnia, Poland, and for ensuing performances. Holmgren believes hisbungling resulted in Modjeska resourcefully adapting to managing own career. The couple had a son Rudolf (or Dolcio or Ralph) and a daughter Maria, the latter not living past the age of 3. Discovering in 1865 that Zimajer was a bigamist with the other wife still living, Modjeska left him. Zimajer abducted Rudolf in 1866, holding the child hostage until an agreed-upon ransom figure was paid in 1869.

She remarried in 1868 to Karol Bożenta Chłapowski, a member of the Polish aristocracy, and veteran of the January Uprising. Holmgren describes Chłapowski as a man who, after the political insurrections, began to reassess his purpose in life, and subsequently developed a keen appreciation of the theatre arts. He later became editor-in-chief of Kraj newspaper. Modjeska, who had learned to master stage roles, easily adapted to the social dictates of the aristocracy. Over the next 8 years, Modjeska's fame ascended to that of a reigning star at the Warsaw Imperial Theatres, but she longed to develop into an international performer.

Modjeska and Chłapowski, along with a small group of friends, emigrated to the United States in 1876. She and close friend Anna Wolska had been discussing the possibility of establishing an American art colony. Chłapowski had instead envisioned a utopian agricultural cooperative. After visiting the Centennial Exposition in Philadelphia and exploring New York City, which she took a dislike to, they sailed to San Francisco. The author notes that she was immediately drawn to the city and its large immigrant population, many of whom were from Poland. Most importantly to Modjeska was the city's theatre culture, and the opportunity to attend the Shakespearean performances of Edwin Booth. She and her husband settled in Southern California, purchasing land in Anaheim, on which they and their friends Henryk Sienkiewicz and Julian Sypniewski operated the co-op. It was sold in 1877 at a loss.

She launched herself on a new acting career, performing in English-language productions throughout the United States. Modjeska performed again in Poland 1884–1885. After being introduced to pianist Ignacy Jan Paderewski by a mutual friend, she was so impressed by his talent that she performed on stage with him in Kraków, and is credited with helping Paderewski launch his public career. She toured America with Edwin Booth in 1889–1890, and returned to Poland once more in 1890. Holmgren gives the reader a glimpse into the loyalty between Paderewski and Modjeska, for as his artistic fortunes rose, hers descended. He returned her earlier generosity in kind by heading a 1905 benefit in her honor at the Metropolitan Opera House in New York. Her final tours of the United States were 1905–1907.

Both she and her husband, as well as her son Rudolf, became naturalized United States citizens in 1893. Modjeska died at Newport Beach, California on April 8, 1909, and her ashes were later interred in Kraków's Rakowicki Cemetery. Holmgren concludes the biography with an examination of the Polish and American commemorations, and glimpses into historical documentations from Modjeska's tours.

== Reception ==
H-Poland Book Review said, "Holmgren’s study is a truly transnational biography, elegantly written and immaculately researched. Its real achievement is to make Modrzejewska whole, not just by bridging two national narratives but by integrating her public and private personae."

Halina Filipowicz of the University of Wisconsin, commented on Wellesley Centers for Women, "The breadth of Holmgren’s research is impressive, as is her talent as a writer ... She proves a fine storyteller, recounting the actress’s life with verve, wit, and a sure eye for vivid detail". Filipowicz expressed disappointment that Holmgren did not delve into, " ... why she remained silent when progressive men and women in Poland campaigned during the 1880s and 1890s to open Polish universities to women".

Kazimierz Braun reviewing in Modern Drama said, "This is an excellent and meticulously rendered book," and lauded Holmgren's skills at putting the narrative together. He thought the book fell short on Holmgren's knowledge of Poland's history.

== Release information ==
- Starring Madame Modjeska: On Tour in Poland and America. Indiana University Press, November 2011. ISBN 978-0253356642
