= Ryan Tucker Jones =

American historian

Ryan Tucker Jones is an American historian specializing in maritime Russia and its relationship with the ecology of the Pacific Ocean.

== Life ==
Jones was born and raised in Portland, Oregon. He completed his PhD from Columbia University and now teaches at the University of Oregon, where he is Ann Swindells Chair of history. As of 2024, he serves as joint editor of the Journal of Pacific History.

Jones is best known for his series of scholarly books and articles on Russia's whaling industry in the Pacific. Among his books are:

- Empire of Extinction: Russians and the Strange Beasts of the Sea
- Red Leviathan: The Soviet Union and the Secret Destruction of the World’s Whales
- Across Species and Cultures: New Histories of Pacific Whaling (co-editor)
- Migrant Ecologies: Environmental Histories of the Pacific World (co-editor)

Red Leviathan was nominated for the Pushkin Book Prize in 2024.
