= Tricia Starks =

American historian

Tricia A. Starks is an American historian. She specializes in the social history of Russia and has written several academic works on the use of tobacco in Tsarist and Soviet times. Her book Cigarettes and Soviets (2022) was nominated for the Pushkin Book Prize.

She is a Distinguished Professor and Director of the Arkansas Humanities Center at the University of Arkansas.

== Selected works ==
- Cigarettes and Soviets: Smoking in the USSR (2022)
- Smoking under the Tsars (2018)
- The Body Soviet: Propaganda, Hygiene, and the Revolutionary State (2008).
- Tobacco in Russian History and Culture: From the Seventeenth Century to the Present (2009) - coeditor
