= Timur Djordjadze =

Soviet theatre director

Timur Djordjadze (Темур Джорджадзе; 1934/35–1984) was a Soviet theatre director of Georgian origin. He studied at the State Theater Institute in Tbilisi, Georgia and the State Institute of Theater Arts in Moscow. After marrying the American literary scholar Edythe Haber, he moved to the United States in 1980. He joined Pace University, where he was an associate professor of fine arts. He directed stage productions in Boston, Chicago and New York, where he was co-artistic director of the Open World Theater Company from 1983 to 1984.
