= Brian Boeck =

American historian

Brian J. Boeck is an American historian. He obtained his doctorate in Russian history from Harvard University, and now teaches Russian and Soviet history at DePaul University in Chicago. His biography of the Soviet writer Mikhail Sholokhov was published to critical acclaim and was nominated for the 2020 Pushkin Book Prize.
