= Jan Matti Dollbaum =

German political scientist

Jan Matti Dollbaum is a German political scientist. He studied at University of Heidelberg and Johannes Gutenberg University of Mainz before obtaining a doctorate from the University of Bremen in 2020. A post-doctoral fellow at Bremen, he has also conducted research at LMU Munich, UNC Chapel Hill and the Higher School of Economics, Moscow.

Dollbaum has co-authored, with Ben Noble and Morvan Lallouet, a book on Alexei Navalny, his politics and his movement. The book, targeted for a broad, non-specialist readership, was nominated for the Pushkin Book Prize.
