= Stephen Walsh (writer) =

British musicologist (born 1942)

Stephen Walsh (born 6 June 1942) is a British journalist, broadcaster, musicologist, and classical music biographer. He is the author of biographies of Stravinsky, Mussorgsky, and Debussy, as well as books on Schumann, Bartók, and the music of Stravinsky. As of 2021, he is an emeritus professor of Cardiff University.

== Biography ==
Walsh was born in Chipping Norton, Oxfordshire in 1942. He was educated at Kingston Grammar School, St. Paul's School, London, and Gonville and Caius College, Cambridge where he read English. He worked as a music critic for The Times, Financial Times, and the Daily Telegraph, and as a frequent broadcaster for the BBC on classical music topics. From 1966 to 1985, he was deputy music critic of The Observer, overlapping with a senior lectureship at Cardiff University from 1976. He later held a chair at the university. He retired from Cardiff in 2013, since when he has continued his career as a freelance author and biographer.

Walsh is best known for his two-volume biography of Igor Stravinsky (2000 and 2006). The first volume, Stravinsky: A Creative Spring, won the Royal Philharmonic Society Prize for best music book of 2000. The second volume, Stravinsky: The Second Exile, was named by the Washington Post as one of the ten best books of 2006. The biography involved Walsh in a controversy with the composer's former assistant, Robert Craft, in the journal, Areté, which published a seventy-five-page interview with Craft consisting largely of an attack on the biography and its author, accusing him, among other things, of plagiarism. Walsh responded by pointing out a large number of errors in Craft's own work and categorically refuting the accusation of plagiarism.

Walsh's Mussorgsky and his Circle (2013) was shortlisted for the 2014 Pushkin House Book Award. His Debussy: a Painter in Sound was published in 2018. Walsh is also the translator of Pierre Boulez’s Relevés d'apprenti (as Stocktakings from an Apprenticeship).
