= Collapse: The Fall of the Soviet Union =

2021 non-fiction book by Vladislav M. Zubok

- Author: Vladislav M. Zubok
- Language: English
- Genre: Non-fiction
- Publisher: Yale University Press
- Publication date: November 30, 2021
- Publication place: United States
- Media type: Print, digital
- ISBN: 978-0-300-26244-5

Collapse: The Fall of the Soviet Union is a 2021 non-fiction book by the Russian historian Vladislav M. Zubok. The book analyses the dissolution of the USSR, with particular focus on the consequences of General Secretary Mikhail Gorbachev's economic reforms.

== Background ==
After completing his PhD at the Institute for US and Canadian Studies in 1985, a Soviet think tank specialising in North American foreign policy, Zubok and his family moved from Moscow to Massachusetts. Zubok explains in the introduction that he was working as an archival researcher at Amherst College at the time of the Soviet Union's dissolution.

When writing Collapse, Zubok drew from three decades' worth of sources collected throughout his career as a Cold War historian. Interviewees from the former Soviet Union include Eduard Shevardnadze, the final Soviet minister of foreign affairs; Anatoly Chernyaev, a foreign policy advisor to Gorbachev; Dmitry Yazov, one of Gorbachev's Ministers of Defence; and Oleg Baklanov, the head of the Soviet space program in the 1980s. American interviewees include Condoleezza Rice, Robert Zoellick, and Francis Fukuyama.

== Synopsis ==
Part I: Hope and Hubris (1983 – 1990) focuses on the implementation of political reform in the USSR, with particular attention devoted to Gorbachev’s time as General Secretary. Part II: Decline and Downfall (1991) covers the final twelve months of the USSR’s collapse, concluding with its dissolution in December 1991.

While he remains critical of the command economy, Zubok challenges the assertion that the collapse of the Soviet Union was inevitable. He argues that the USSR "fell victim to a perfect storm and a hapless captain," and that the poor execution of Gorbachev's economic and social reforms hastened the country's dissolution. "He combined ideological reformist zeal with political timidity, schematic messianism with practical detachment, visionary and breath-taking foreign policy with an inability to promote crucial domestic reforms."

== Critical response ==
Upon its release, Collapse was shortlisted for the 2022 Pushkin House Russian Book Prize. Rodric Braithwaite, the last British ambassador to the USSR, called the book "a deeply informed account of how the Soviet Union fell apart" in an article for the Financial Times.

Geoffrey Roberts of The Irish Times called Collapse a "deeply researched and emotionally engaging" treatment of the Soviet Union's collapse. "It is difficult to envisage how there could be a better book on the subject."

Victor Sebestyen positively reviewed Collapse in The Sunday Times, drawing particular praise to his "masterly and nuanced" portrayal of Gorbachev. "There have been several books over the past quarter century that have covered this territory. Zubok’s is the most comprehensive, detailed and original, although it is not always the easiest to follow."
