= Julie A. Buckler =

American literary scholar

Academic background
- Education: Harvard University (PhD); Yale University (BA)

Academic work
- Discipline: literary scholar
- Sub-discipline: comparative literature
- Institutions: Harvard University

Julie A. Buckler is an American literary scholar and Samuel Hazzard Cross Professor of Slavic Languages and Literatures and of Comparative Literature at Harvard University. She is known for her expertise on comparative literature.

She has two works that have won awards with the American Association of Teachers of Slavic and East European Languages: In 2000 for The Literary Lorgnette: Attending Opera in Imperial Russia (Best Book in Literary/Cultural Scholarship), and in 2020 for the Russian Performances: Word, Object, Action (Best Edited Multi-Author Scholarly Volume).

== Books ==
- Russian Performances: Word, Object, Action. Co-edited with Julie Cassiday and Boris Wolfson, University of Wisconsin Press 2018
- Mapping St. Petersburg: Imperial Text and Cityshape, Princeton University Press, 2005
- The Literary Lorgnette: Attending Opera in Imperial Russia. Stanford University Press, 2000
- Rites of Place: Public Commemoration in Russia and Eastern Europe, Julie A. Buckler and Emily D. Johnson, eds. Northwestern University Press, 2012
