= Benjamin Nathans =

American historian

- Born: 1962 (age 63–64)
- Relatives: Daniel Nathans (father)
- Awards: 2025 Pulitzer Prize for General Nonfiction; 2003 Koret Jewish Book Award

Academic background
- Education: BA, Yale University; MA, PhD, 1995, University of California, Berkeley
- Thesis: Beyond the pale: the Jewish encounter with Russia, 1840-1900 (1995)

Academic work
- Institutions: University of Pennsylvania; Indiana University Bloomington

Benjamin Nathans (born 1962) is an American historian. He is the Alan Charles Kors Endowed Term Professor of History at the University of Pennsylvania. His book, To the Success of Our Hopeless Cause: The Many Lives of the Soviet Dissident Movement received the 2025 Pulitzer Prize for General Nonfiction and won the 2025 Pushkin House Russian Book Prize.

== Early life and education ==
Nathans was born in 1962 to parents Joanne and Daniel Nathans. His father was a microbiologist who won the 1978 Nobel Prize in Physiology or Medicine. After completing his schooling at the Park School of Baltimore in 1979, Nathans earned his Bachelor of Arts degree at Yale University and his PhD at the University of California, Berkeley. Immediately following his graduation in 1984, Nathans spent time studying at the University of Tübingen in West Germany.

As a graduate student, Nathans spent the spring of 1987 attending Leningrad State University as part of the Council on International Educational Exchange program. He also spent the summer of 1989 at Hebrew University of Jerusalem. Nathans finished his PhD dissertation under the supervision of Reggie Zelnik.

== Career ==
Upon completing his PhD in 1995, Nathans became an assistant professor of History and Jewish Studies at Indiana University Bloomington. He remained there until 1998, when he became a faculty member in the Department of History at the University of Pennsylvania. As the M. Mark and Esther K. Watkins Assistant Professor in the Humanities, Nathans published Beyond the Pale: The Jewish Encounter with Late Imperial Russia in 2002. The book, which won the 2003 Koret Jewish Book Award, focused on Jews who lived, literally or figuratively, outside the Pale of Settlement in Russia.

Nathans’ book, To the Success of Our Hopeless Cause: The Many Lives of the Soviet Dissident Movement received the 2025 Pulitzer Prize for General Nonfiction. It was also shortlisted for the Cundill History Prize.
