= Edythe Haber =

American literary scholar

Edythe Haber is an American literary scholar, specializing in the history of Russian literature. She is Professor Emerita at the University of Massachusetts Boston. She is best known for her biography of the Russian emigre writer Teffi, which was published to critical acclaim in 2018. This was the first biography of Teffi in any language and played an important role in the ongoing discovery of Teffi in the West. She has also written a biography of Bulgakov.

She was married to the Georgian theatre director Timur Djordjadze, who died in 1994.
