= Susannah Buckler =

Irish thief and prostitute

Susannah Buckler, also known as Mrs. Matthews, was a convicted thief and prostitute from Dublin, Ireland. who was involved in a bloody convict mutiny aboard the brigantine Baltimore bound for Annapolis, Maryland. She is notorious for her escape from authorities in Nova Scotia following the mutiny.

On 9 May 1736, a woman claiming to be Susannah Buckler arrived at Annapolis Royal accompanied by Charles D'Entremont (a Pubnico man who found her), and George Mitchell (a surveyor for the Crown). She was taken to Lt. Gov. Lawrence Armstrong, where she related her story. She was the wife of shipowner and merchant Andrew Buckler on the brigantine Baltimore. Baltimore left Dublin, Ireland, on 7 October 1735 to sail to Annapolis, Maryland. According to Buckler, on 15 December 1735 they were off-routed by bad weather and accidentally washed up into Chebogue harbour, near Cape Sable off the coast of Nova Scotia. For lack of fresh water, the crew perished except Buckler and two sailors. She had left the sailors alive when she was robbed (along with the £12,000 sterling cargo aboard the ship) and kidnapped by the Mi'kmaq on 4 April 1736. She was later found by Mr. D'Entremont and taken to Annapolis Royal.

Armstrong believed her story and sent Ensign Charles Vane to search for the abandoned ship. In the meantime, Armstrong sent Buckler to Boston with money and letters of introduction to Boston Governor J. Belcher. A few weeks after he had sent Buckler to Boston, Armstrong received a letter from Barbados of a woman inquiring of the fate of her husband, Andrew Buckler, of the ship Baltimore. The letter was from the real Susannah Buckler, and sent Armstrong into a furious hunt for the mystery woman who had duped him.

It was later found that Baltimore had actually been carrying a cargo of 60-70 convicts from Ireland being transported to Maryland. It is thought that the convicts rose against and slaughtered the owner Andrew Buckler, the captain Richard White, and the crew. Without navigation skills, and fear of being known in larger ports, the mutinous convicts harboured in a quiet bay where they all ran off or perished except Susannah Buckler. Her true identity was later surmised to possibly be a Mrs. Matthews, a convicted thief and prostitute from Dublin.

Some of the mutineers from Baltimore were caught and tried in Salem, Massachusetts, but Matthews was never seen again. It is believed that she returned to Ireland.
