= Philip Bullock =

British academic

- Education: Durham University
- Occupation: Academic
- Employer: Wadham College, Oxford

Philip Ross Bullock is a British academic. He is a Professor of Russian Literature and Music at the University of Oxford, a fellow of Wadham College, Oxford, and the academic director of The Oxford Research Centre in the Humanities (TORCH). He is the recipient of the 2009 Philip Leverhulme Prize for Modern Languages, and the author or editor of several books.

== Early life ==
Philip Ross Bullock graduated from Durham University, where he earned a bachelor's degree. He subsequently earned a PhD from Wadham College, Oxford, where he wrote his thesis on Russian writer Andrei Platonov.

== Career ==
Bullock previously taught at the University of Wales, Bangor and University College, London (UCL). He is a Professor of Russian Literature and Music at the University of Oxford. He is also a fellow of Wadham College, and a lecturer at Christ Church, Magdalen College and Worcester College. He is the recipient of the 2009 Philip Leverhulme Prize for Modern Languages, and the author or editor of several books. Since October 2017, he has been the academic director of The Oxford Research Centre in the Humanities (TORCH).

His first book, The Feminine in the Prose of Andrey Platonov, is a feminist critique of Andrey Platonov's works, based on Bullock's PhD thesis. Reviewing it for the Slavic Review, professor Thomas Seifrid of the University of Southern California "offers a far more extensive and synthetic account" of Platonov's works than previous scholars. In the Modern Language Review, professor Anat Vernitki of the University of Essex praised the book's focus on gender, but added that "spiritualist and religious" aspects could have been analyzed too. In The Slavonic and East European Review, Michael Purglove called it an "interesting and unusual book", and he praised the feminist analysis. In a review for The Russian Review, professor Eric Naiman of the University of California, Berkeley called it an "insightful and well-written contribution to Platonov scholarship", an "indispensable book on Platonov" and "a compelling study in the value of and limits of methodology, as well as the story of a critic instructively fitting an interpretive apparatus to an original aesthetic worldview...and then letting go."

His second book, Rosa Newmarch and Russian Music in Late Nineteenth and Early Twentieth Century England, is about the role that British music critic Rosa Newmarch played in promoting Russian music in England. In a review for The Russian Review, professor Ellon D. Carpenter of Arizona State University praised the book by concluding, "Mrs. Newmarch was well overdue for a book of her own; Mr. Bullock is to be congratulated for having supplied it." In a review for The Slavic and East European Journal, professor Brad Michael Damaré of the University of Southern California called it, "a very well-researched, well-argued monograph about a writer whose work on Russian music deserves exactly this kind of reassessment."

Bullock subsequently edited three books, the first of which, The Correspondence of Jean Sibelius and Rosa Newmarch, 1906–1939, is an edited volume of letters as well as "telegrams and postcards" between Newmarch and Finnish composer Jean Sibelius. In a review for Notes, Ryan Ross, an assistant professor at Mississippi State University, described it as "a collection that teaches us much about Sibelius, but at least as much about Rosa Newmarch." The second book was Loyalties, Solidarities and Identities in Russian Society, History and Culture. The third book, Russia in Britain 1880–1940: From Melodrama to Modernism, is "a collection of 13 articles" derived from an academic conference at Senate House.

Bullock's seventh book, Pyotr Tchakovsky, is a biography of the Russian composer Tchaikovsky. In a review for the Journal of European Studies, professor Marina Frolova-Walker of the University of Cambridge commends Bullock for separating the artistic self from the personal, especially with regards to Tchaikovsky's homosexuality, which did not necessarily inform his music. She highlighted that Bullock's "lucid and factually reliable account of both Tchaikovsky’s personal and artistic lives is written with style and elegance", and that it "contains a wealth of historical and musical detail."

== Selected works ==
- Bullock, Philip Ross (2005). The Feminine in the Prose of Andrey Platonov. London, U.K.: Legenda. ISBN 9781900755757. OCLC 469641659.
- Bullock, Philip Ross (2009). Rosa Newmarch and Russian Music in Late Nineteenth and Early Twentieth-Century England. Farnham, U.K.: Ashgate. ISBN 9780754666622. OCLC 939160839.
- Bullock, Philip Ross, ed. (2011). The Correspondence of Jean Sibelius and Rosa Newmarch, 1906-1939. London, U.K.: Boydell & Brewer. ISBN 9781843836834. OCLC 773972511.
- Byford, Andy; Nun-Ingerflom, Claudio; Ohayon, Isabelle; Rubins, Maria; Winestein, Anna, eds. (2013). Loyalties, Solidarities and Identities in Russian Society, History and Culture. London, U.K.: School of Slavonic and East European Studies UCL. ISBN 9780903425827. OCLC 900440700.
- Beasley, Rebecca; Bullock, Philip Ross, eds. (2013). Russia in Britain, 1880-1940: From Melodrama to Modernism. Oxford, U.K.: Oxford University Press. ISBN 9780191757761. OCLC 940606232.
- Bullock, Philip Ross (2016). Pyotr Tchaikovsky. London, U.K.: Reaktion Books. ISBN 9781780236544. OCLC 932385370.
- Bullock, Philip Ross (2022). Rachmaninoff and His World. Chicago, U.S.: University of Chicago Press. ISBN 9780226823744. OCLC 1304813927.
