= Sergei Medvedev (writer) =

Russian writer and scholar (born 1966)

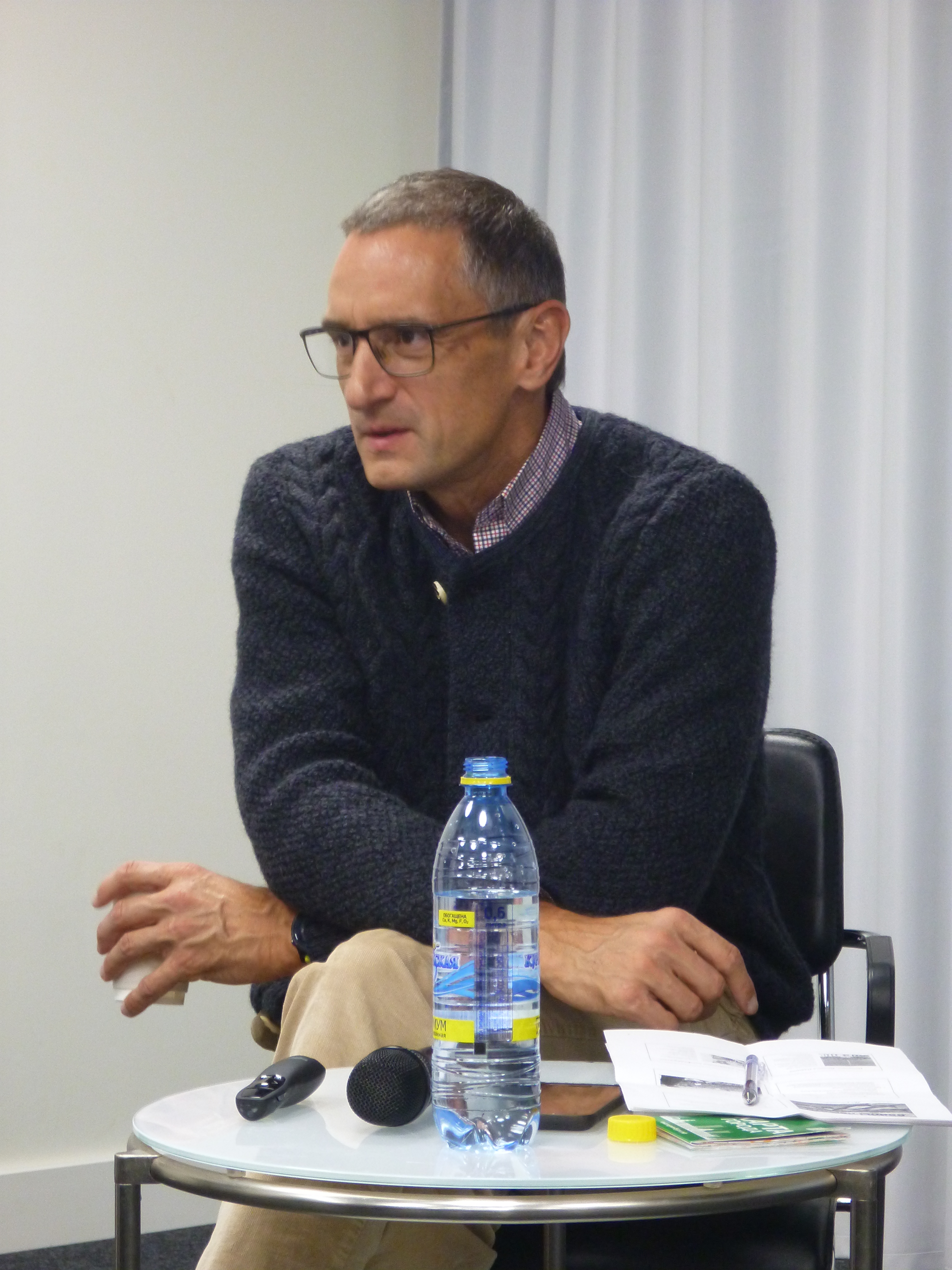
Sergei Medvedev at Yeltsin Center in 2019

Sergei Aleksandrovich Medvedev (Russian: Сергей Александрович Медведев; born December 20, 1966) is a Russian journalist. He is currently an affiliate professor at the Charles University in Prague, and he has previously worked at the Marshall Center for Security Studies in Germany, the Finnish Institute of International Affairs in Helsinki, the Istituto Affari Internazionali in Rome, and the Institute of Europe of Russian Academy of Sciences in Moscow.

Medvedev won the 2020 Pushkin House Russian Book Prize for his book The Return of the Russian Leviathan. The book was translated by Stephen Dalziel, and was widely praised in the US and UK.
