= Douglas Smith (writer) =

American writer, historian and translator

Douglas Smith is an American writer, historian and translator best known for his books about the history of Russia.

Smith was born and raised in Minnesota. After studying German and Russian at the University of Vermont, he earned a PhD in History from the University of California, Los Angeles. He has also worked for the US Department of State in the Soviet Union, and as a Russia analyst for Radio Free Europe.

Smith lives in Seattle with his wife and their two children.

Former People is the recipient of the 2013 Pushkin House Russian Book Prize.

== Bibliography ==
- The City Without Jews: Life and Death in Nazi Vienna. Farrar, Straus and Giroux, 2026. ISBN 9780374606558
- The Russian Job: The Forgotten Story of How America Saved the Soviet Union from Ruin. Farrar, Straus and Giroux, 2019. ISBN 9780374252960
- Rasputin: Faith, Power, and the Twilight of the Romanovs. Farrar, Straus and Giroux, 2016. ISBN 9780374240844
- Former People: The Final Days of the Russian Aristocracy. Farrar, Straus and Giroux, 2012. ISBN 9780374157616
- The Pearl: A True Tale of Forbidden Love in Catherine the Great's Russia. Yale University Press, 2008. ISBN 9780300120417
- Love and Conquest: Personal Correspondence of Catherine the Great and Prince Grigory Potemkin. Northern Illinois University Press, 2004. ISBN 9780875803241
- Working the Rough Stone: Freemasonry and Society in Eighteenth-Century Russia. Northern Illinois University Press, 1999. ISBN 9780875802466
