= Slavic and East European Journal =

Peer-reviewed Slavist journal

- Discipline: Slavic studies
- Language: English
- Edited by: George Gasyna

Publication details
- History: 1957-present
- Publisher: American Association of Teachers of Slavic and East European Languages (United States)
- Frequency: Quarterly

Standard abbreviations
- ISO 4: Slav. East Eur. J.

Indexing
- ISSN: 0037-6752
- LCCN: 49017078
- JSTOR: 00376752
- OCLC no.: 263598261

Links
- Journal homepage

The Slavic and East European Journal (SEEJ) is a major peer-reviewed academic journal publishing original research and review essays in the areas of Slavic and East European languages, literatures, cultures, linguistics, methodology, and pedagogy, as well as reviews of books published in these areas.

== History ==
SEEJ is one of the oldest American Slavist academic journals. Founded in 1945 as the Bulletin of the American Association of Teachers of Slavonic and East European Languages, the title changed to Bulletin of the American Association of Teachers of Slavic and East European Languages in 1947.

In 1954, "to bring the publication into conformity with the general pattern of foreign language teachers' publications," the name changed to The AATSEEL Journal. In 1957, under the leadership of Professor J. Thomas Shaw, a distinguished Pushkinist who taught at the University of Wisconsin–Madison, the journal took on its modern form as the Slavic and East European Journal and increased its page count to allow for the publication of research articles to supplement its pedagogical material.

All back issues of the journal are available electronically through JSTOR. Information regarding current and recent issues are available to members on the website of the American Association of Teachers of Slavic and East European Languages.

The editorship of the journal changes every five years. Currently, the editorial offices are housed in the Department of Slavic Languages and Liteatures at the University of Illinois, Urbana-Champaign.

== Bibliography ==
- Kopper, John (2006). "Out from under Siege: The First Volume of "SEEJ" and the Professionalization of Slavic Studies in the United States". The Slavic and East European Journal. 50 (1): 12–28. doi:10.2307/20459231. ISSN 0037-6752. JSTOR 20459231.
