= American Council of Teachers of Russian =

American Council of Teachers of Russian (ACTR) is a professional organization that advances research, training, and materials development in the fields of Russian and English language; strengthens communication within and between communities of scholars and educators in language, literature, and area studies in the United States and the countries of eastern Europe, Russia and Eurasia; and furthers educational reform through training, institution building, and technical assistance.

It was founded in 1974. The current president of ACTR is Nataliya Ushakova.

== History ==
In the mid-1980s with the gradual opening of Soviet society, the ACTR board established The American Council for Collaboration in Education and Language Study (ACCELS). ACCELS undertook the administration of U.S. government-funded exchanges for a variety of audiences, including high school and undergraduate students, teachers, professionals, and academics.

In 1998, ACTR and ACCELS united to one organization. Now ACTR and ACCELS continue as divisions of American Councils for International Education. ACTR is the professional association and the focus of educational, training, and research programs for U.S. citizens; ACCELS administers exchange, training, and technical assistance programs with the countries of eastern Europe, Russia, and Eurasia.

== Membership ==
ACTR is also a member organization of the International Association of Teachers of Russian Language and Literature (MAPRYAL).

== See also ==
- American Association of Teachers of Slavic and Eastern European Languages
- Association for Slavic, East European, and Eurasian Studies
