= Rosalind Polly Blakesley =

British art historian and academic

- Occupation: Academic
- Spouse: Patrick James Blakesley
- Children: 2

Academic background
- Education: University of Oxford, University of Cambridge

Rosalind Polly Blakesley (née Gray) is a prize-winning author, art historian and academic, and the current Master of Pembroke College, Cambridge. She has taught art history at the University of Cambridge, been a Fellow of Pembroke College since 2002, and a Professor of Russian and European Art since 2018. She previously worked at The Queen's College, Oxford, the Russian Institute of Art History, Newcastle University, and the University of Kent.

== Academic career ==
Blakesley is Professor of Russian and European Art at the University of Cambridge, a Fellow of Pembroke College, Cambridge, and co-founder of the Cambridge Courtauld Russian Art Centre. A syndic of the Fitzwilliam Museum, Trustee of the Samuel Courtauld Trust, and former Trustee of the National Portrait Gallery in London, she has curated exhibitions in Britain, Russia and the US, including Russia and the Arts: The Age of Tolstoy and Tchaikovsky at the National Portrait Gallery in 2016.

Blakesley's most recent book, The Russian Canvas: Painting in Imperial Russia 1757-1881, was awarded the Pushkin House Russian Book Prize, the Art Newspaper Russia Best Book Award, and Honourable Mention from the Heldt Prize Committee for Best Book by a Woman in Slavic Studies. Other books include Russia and the Arts (2016), The Arts and Crafts Movement (2006) and Russian Genre Painting in the Nineteenth Century (2000, under her maiden name of Gray), as well as the co-edited volumes From Realism to the Silver Age (2014), Russian Art and the West (2007), and An Imperial Collection: Women Artists from the State Hermitage Museum (the catalogue of an exhibition Blakesley curated at the National Museum of Women in the Arts, Washington DC, in 2003).

In 2017 Blakesley was awarded the Pushkin Medal by the Russian Federation for services to Anglo-Russian relations and Russian art. In 2020, her book on Catherine the Great was shortlisted for the Apollo Magazine book of the year award.

== Personal life ==
In 2001, Rosalind Gray married Patrick James Blakesley, a barrister and KC. Together they have two children.

== Selected publications ==
- Russian Genre Painting in the Nineteenth Century. Oxford, 2000. (Oxford Historical Monographs) (under her maiden name of Rosalind P. Gray)
- An Imperial Collection: Women Artists from the State Hermitage Museum. London, 2003. (co-editor and contributor)
- The Arts and Crafts Movement. London, 2006.
- Russian Art and the West: a Century of Dialogue in Painting, Architecture and the Decorative Arts. DeKalb, Ill., 2007. (co-editor and contributor)
- From Realism to the Silver Age: New Studies in Russian Artistic Culture. DeKalb, Ill., 2014. (co-editor and contributor)
- The Russian Canvas: Painting in Imperial Russia, 1757-1878. New Haven and London, 2016. ISBN 978-0300184372
