= Gregory Freidin =

American literary scholar (born 1946)

- Born: 1946 (age 79–80)

Academic work
- Discipline: Literary scholar
- Sub-discipline: Comparative literature
- Institutions: Stanford University
- Doctoral students: Julie Cassiday

Gregory Freidin (born 1946) is an American literary scholar and Professor Emeritus of Slavic Languages and Literatures at Stanford University. He is known for his expertise on comparative literature. He was Dmitri Keuseff Professor of Slavic Studies from 2003 until 2004.

== Early life and education ==
Freidin was educated in the Soviet Union before emigrating to the United States. He completed his graduate studies at the University of California, Berkeley, earning an M.A. and Ph.D. in Slavic Languages and Literatures in 1979. His doctoral dissertation, focused on the poetry and cultural poetics of Osip Mandelstam.

== Academic career ==
Freidin joined Stanford University in 1978, prior to completing his Ph.D., and has remained on the faculty throughout his career. He has twice chaired the Department of Slavic Languages and Literatures, serving from 1994 to 1997 and again from 1998 to 2001. He later directed the Center for Russian, East European, and Eurasian Studies from 2003 to 2004 and has also served as acting head of the Division of Literatures, Cultures, and Languages (DLCL).

At Stanford, Freidin has taught a wide range of undergraduate and graduate courses, including Oedipus in Russia, Tolstoy’s War and Peace, The Modernist Paradigm, and Russian Symbolism. His teaching reflects his broad interests in Russian literature, literary modernism, cultural identity, and the intersection of literature with political life.

Freidin’s scholarship spans Russian modernism, Soviet and post-Soviet culture, literary biography, and the symbolic construction of national identity in late twentieth-century Russia. Early in his career, he focused on the poetry and mythopoetics of Osip Mandelstam, culminating in his monograph A Coat of Many Colors (1987).

After an extended period of research on post-Soviet cultural transformations, Freidin returned to a long-standing project on Isaac Babel. His forthcoming manuscript, A Jew on Horseback, is a critical biography that examines both Babel’s life and the distinctive narrative voice that shapes his fragmentary oeuvre.

In collaboration with sociologist Victoria E. Bonnell, Freidin has also undertaken a book-length study titled Conjuring up a New Russia: Symbols, Rituals, and Mythologies of National Identity, 1991–2002, which examines the symbolic and ritual dimensions of nation-building in post-Soviet Russia.
