= Elena Kostyuchenko =

Russian journalist

- Елена Костюченко
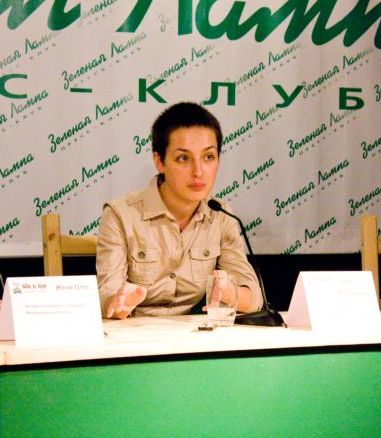
- Kostyuchenko in 2011
- Born: 25 July 1987 (age 39); Yaroslavl, Russia SSR
- Education: Moscow State University
- Occupations: Journalist, activist
- Spouse: Yana Kuchina (m. 2024)

Elena Gennadyevna Kostyuchenko (Russian: Елена Геннадьевна Костюченко; born 25 September 1987) is a Russian journalist and gay rights activist in exile. She is an investigative reporter for the newspaper Novaya Gazeta.

Kostyuchenko was the first journalist to write about the punk protest band Pussy Riot and about the Zhanaozen massacre in 2011. She covered protests against the construction of a controversial 12-lane highway through the Khimki Forest, and exposed the presence of Russian fighters in the War in Donbas in Eastern Ukraine.

She has been assaulted and arrested on several occasions in retribution for her journalism and activism. In October 2022 she survived a possible poison attack in Munich, Germany.

== Career ==
Kostyuchenko is from the town of Yaroslavl, not far from Moscow. By age 16, she was already working on the local paper in Yaroslavl. She later said that “when I started working as a journalist, I had no lofty aspirations.... I just wanted to buy winter boots with buckles; my family was poor. I had the option either to clean the school for six months, or to try to write something in the local paper. I decided to try to write something in the local paper.” Then, she read an article about Chechnya by Anna Politkovskaya in Novaya Gazeta, described by the Guardian as “the last major publication consistently critical of Kremlin power” and as a newspaper “dedicated to real journalism, unlike Russian television and most other newspapers, all under [President Vladimir] Putin's thumb.” The article proved revelatory to Kostyuchenko: “I was shocked. I realised that everything I knew about this country, about what was happening, was wrong,”.

Kostyuchenko then moved to Moscow, studied journalism at Moscow State University, and at age 17 was taken on as an intern at Novaya Gazeta. She later became a full staffer, and was the newspaper's youngest staff member ever. When Politkovskaya was assassinated in October 2006, said Kostyuchenko two and a half years later, “I realized I had never told her she was my idol.” Now, she stated, she praised all her colleagues, because “You come to work, see your colleagues and think: 'Who's next?'”

Kostyuchenko was beaten and hospitalized at a 2011 Pride parade.

Kostyuchenko was the first journalist to break the information blockade around the city of Zhanaozen during the Zhanaozen massacre in December 2011.

Filipp and Tikhon Dzyadko interviewed her for the TV Rain program “The Dzyadko Three” on January 24, 2013, the day before the Duma passed its first reading of the law banning the promotion of homosexuality. Kostyuchenko discussed a “Day of Kisses” in which she had taken part earlier that week. The action involved “just going to the Duma with a mixed group of people, homosexuals, heterosexuals, couples, singles, and, for those who have them, significant others. If a person doesn’t have anyone to kiss, they just hug whoever is standing next to them.” The result had been violence by Russian Orthodox activists and others against the participants: “Two of my friends got their noses broken,” she said, “and they beat up my girlfriend.” Asked about the demonstration, she said that “doing something is always better than sitting at home and waiting around for Duma deputies to declare you a second-class citizen.” She underscored that “I am not the center of LGBT activism in Russia. I actually don’t do that much activism: I have a lot of other work. It’s just that I’ve been focusing on it this past week because I know that my life specifically will be severely affected for a long time, as will the lives of millions of gays and lesbians in Russia.”

In May 2013, Kostyuchenko was arrested for taking part in a Pride rally in Moscow.

In September 2013, Kostyuchenko threatened on Twitter to “out” closeted Russian politicians who voted for a bill that equated homosexuality with alcoholism and drug abuse and that would remove children from gay parents. “This is a warning,” she wrote. “They want to destroy our lives, and we will destroy them.” She said that publicly revealing the private same-sex activities of Russian members of parliament was a “nuclear bomb” that should be used only as a “last resort,” but that given the proposed bill that would remove children from the homes of gay and lesbian parents, she said that “such a time has come.” She promised to publish a report outing closeted Duma members on the day the bill had its first reading in the State Duma.

In February 2014, Kostyuchenko was one of about ten LGBT activists who were arrested during a protest in Red Square in Moscow. While the opening ceremonies of the Sochi Olympics were taking place, they sang the Russian national anthem as they displayed a rainbow flag. After her release, Kostyuchenko said she suspected police had known in advance about the protest by tapping her phone and had been waiting for them. She said she changed the location a half-hour prior to the protest, and had only communicated the new location through phone calls and text messages, which she believed were intercepted.

In June 2014, Kostyuchenko reported on apparent efforts by Russian authorities to cover up the return of Russian militia's bodies to Russia after being killed in battle at the Donetsk Airport in Ukraine. A November 2014 report by Radio Free Europe / Radio Liberty described the support group Children-404 (“Deti-404” in Russian) on the Russian social networking site Vkontakte, which “aims to provide a safe virtual space” for LGBT teens. The report quoted Kostyuchenko as calling it “the best and most humanistic project working for Russia’s LGBT community at the moment,”because under the new Russian law banning pro-gay “propaganda,” “the most vulnerable section of society are LGBT teenagers.” She added: “According to this law, LGBT teenagers do not exist.”

In 2018, Kostyuchenko was the Paul Klebnikov Russian Civil Society Fellow at Columbia University's Harriman Institute.

In early 2022, Kostyuchenko travelled to Ukraine reporting on the Russian invasion of Ukraine from places like Odesa, Mykolaiv and the occupied Kherson. On March 30 in Zaporizhzhia, where she prepared to visit the surrounded Mariupol she received a warning that Chechen units at Russian checkpoints shall have been ordered to kill her. She left the country and fled to the EU, finally staying in Berlin as a reporter for online exile newspaper Meduza.

In October 2022, Kostyuchenko was on a trip to Munich to try and obtain a new Ukraine visa, when she was potentially poisoned. With no medical analysis until ten days later, a poison could not be detected, but severe liver damage and additional indications got diagnosed. Poison specialists later hinted at organochlorine compounds as possible substances used. In 2023, Kostyuchenko published an essay revealing that she suspected she had been poisoned by the Russian state in 2022 as a response of her journalism covering the Russian invasion of Ukraine.

October 2023 saw the publication in English of a selection of her writing, entitled I Love Russia: Reporting from a Lost Country, translated by Bela Shayevich and Ilona Yazhbin Chavasse, and published by Penguin Press. It has received worldwide appreciation and several awards, including Best Book of the Year by The New Yorker and Time magazine, New York Times Book Review Editors' Choice, and the 2024 Pushkin House Book Prize. The book has subsequently been translated into other languages as well; the French title is Russie, Mon Pays Bien-aimé (Russia, My Beloved Country).

== Personal life ==
Kostyuchenko is an open lesbian. In March 2024, she married “Takie Dela” journalist Yana Kuchina.

== Views on journalism ==
Kostyuchenko has said that “if we can say that the new social journalism has a purpose, this purpose is to give a voice to everyone.” She has also said that Russians “absolutely do not know what is happening in our country... because the regional press has been almost completely destroyed by the local authorities, we know nothing about what is happening in the regions.” In addition, she has complained that there are few realistic TV reports about events in the provinces. Only the Internet, she has added, provides some degree of valuable regional reportage.

== Honors and awards ==
In May 2013, she was one of seven persons to win the “Freedom” award for her reportage about the Zhanaozen protests.

She won the 2013 Fritt Ord (Free Word) Prize in Norway.

Kostyuchenko was a speaker at the 2015 Oslo Freedom Forum.

In 2015, she was awarded with the Distinguished Writing Award by the European Press Prize.

For her book I Love Russia: Reporting from a Lost Country Kostyuchenko was awarded with the 2024 Pushkin House Book Prize and named within the best books of the year 2023 by The New Yorker and Time magazine.

== Bibliography ==
- Kostyuchenko, Elena (2023). I Love Russia: Reporting from a Lost Country. New York, Penguin Press. ISBN 978-0593655269
