= Owen Matthews =

British writer, historian and journalist

- Born: December 1971 (age 54–55)
- Education: Christ Church, Oxford
- Occupation: Journalist
- Writing career
- Genre: Non-fiction
- Subject: History

Owen Matthews (born December 1971) is a British writer, historian and journalist. His first book, Stalin's Children, was shortlisted for the 2008 Guardian First Book Award, the Orwell Prize for political writing, and France's Prix Médicis Etranger. His books have been translated into 28 languages. He is a former Moscow and Istanbul Bureau Chief for Newsweek.

== Biography ==
Owen Matthews was born in London in 1971. His father was Mervyn Matthews, a British expert on Soviet society. His mother Lyudmila Bibikova was born in Kharkov, Soviet Ukraine, and he speaks Russian as a native speaker. Matthews's maternal grandfather, Boris Bibikov, was a Communist Party supporter.

Matthews studied Modern History at Christ Church, Oxford.

== Collected media ==
=== Journalism ===
During the Bosnian War, Matthews worked as a freelance foreign correspondent in Budapest, Sarajevo and Belgrade. From 1995 to 1997 he worked as a city and features reporter on The Moscow Times. In 1997 he joined Newsweek Magazine's Moscow Bureau as a correspondent, covering the Second Chechen War. In 2001 he moved to Turkey, reporting from Turkey, the Caucasus, Syria and Iran, and also covering the invasions of Afghanistan and then Iraq. From 2006 to 2012 he was Newsweek's Moscow Bureau Chief; and until 2019 was a Contributing Editor at the magazine. In 2014 he reported for Newsweek on the conflict in Eastern Ukraine. He is currently a contributing writer for The Spectator Magazine.

=== Books ===
==== Non-fiction ====
- Stalin's Children: Three Generations of Love and War (Bloomsbury, 2008), a memoir of three generations of Matthews' family in Russia, was named as a Book of the Year by The Sunday Times and Sunday Telegraph., shortlisted for The Guardian First Books Award, The Orwell Prize, and France's Prix Medicis Etranger. Stalin's Children was translated into 28 languages. (Russian translation: "Антисоветский роман", "Anti-Soviet Romance")
- Glorious Misadventures: Nikolai Rezanov and the Dream of Russian America (Bloomsbury 2013), a history of Imperial Russia's doomed attempt to colonise America, was shortlisted for the 2014 Pushkin House Prize for books on Russia.
- Thinking with the Blood, (Newsweek, 2014), a personal reportage based on a journey across war-torn Ukraine in the late summer of 2014, was published as an ebook.
- An Impeccable Spy: Richard Sorge, Stalin's Master Agent (Bloomsbury, 2019) It was chosen as a Book of the Year by The Economist magazine: "A tragic, heroic story, magnificently told with an understated rage."
- Overreach: The Inside Story of Putin's War on Ukraine (Mudlark/HarperCollins, 2022, revised paperback 2023) is a nonfiction historical and journalistic account of the origins of the 2022 Russian invasion of Ukraine and a history of the first year of the war, based on the author's reporting in Russia and Ukraine during the conflict. Overreach was shortlisted for the Parliamentary Books of the Year prize, the Pushkin House Book Prize 2023 and was also named one of The Daily Telegraph's Books of the Year.

==== Fiction ====
- Moscou Babylone (Les Escales, 2013), a novel based on Matthews' experiences in Moscow in the 1990s, has been published in French, German and Czech. It was chosen as the 'coup de coeur etranger' (favourite foreign book) at the 2013 Nancy Literary Festival, Le Livre sur la Place.
- L'Ombre du Sabre (Les Escales, 2016) A novel inspired by the author's own experiences as a reporter in Chechnya in the 1990s and in Eastern Ukraine in 2014
- Black Sun (Doubleday, 2019) was chosen as a Book of the Year by The Economist; a Crime Book of the Month in The Sunday Times; and one of the Financial Times' Best Thrillers of 2019.
- Red Traitor (Doubleday, 2021).
- White Fox (Doubleday, 2023).

=== Television ===
Matthews co-wrote the 2015 Russian television series Londongrad and played an episodic role in it. Matthews also played the US Ambassador to Moscow in the 2017 Russian television series The Optimists.

In 2016-18 Matthews appeared regularly as a guest on Russian political talk shows 60 Minut (Russia's top-rated talk show on Russia-1); NTV's Mesto Vstrechi and Russia-1's Evening with Vladimir Solovyov. He was known for outspoken criticism of the Kremlin and his clashes with senior Russian politicians, including Vladimir Zhirinovsky.
