= Dominique Moran =

British geographer

Dominique Moran is a British academic geographer. She is a professor in carceral geography at the School of Geography, Earth and Environmental Sciences at the University of Birmingham.

== Early life and education ==
Moran was born in Wigan in Lancashire, UK. Her father, Jo Moran was a credit draper and ornithologist, mountaineer and wildlife photographer. He was the first person to photograph the Leach's Petrel at the nest, and the first to climb the cliffs of the Noup of Noss in Shetland. Her mother Margaret (née Hilton) was a carer for disabled people. She studied geography at Christ Church, University of Oxford, graduating in 1995 with a First and the Gibbs Prize, and then completed a DPhil in geography at Hertford College, Oxford where she held the Mortimer May Senior Scholarship 1996–2000.

== Career ==
After research fellowships at the Universities of Warwick and Birmingham, Moran moved in 2004 to a lectureship at the School of Geography, Earth and Environmental Sciences, University of Birmingham, where she was made professor in Carceral Geography in 2018. She held a visiting fellowship at the Aleksanteri Institute of the University of Helsinki in 2011.

Moran wrote Carceral Geography: Spaces and Practices of Incarceration (2015), and co-edited Carceral Spaces: Mobility and Agency in Imprisonment and Migrant Detention (2013) with Nick Gill and Deirdre Conlon; Historical Geographies of Prisons: Unlocking the Usable Carceral Past (2015) with Karen Morin; Carceral Spatiality: Dialogues between Geography and Criminology (2017) with Anna Schliehe; and The Palgrave Handbook of Prison and the Family (2019) with Marie Hutton. Other writing has been published in the Transactions of the Institute of British Geographers, The Annals of the American Association of Geographers, Progress in Human Geography and Theoretical Criminology.

She was the founding chair (2017-2021) of the Carceral Geography Working Group of the Royal Geographical Society with the Institute of British Geographers.

== Press coverage ==
Moran's research with Phil Jones, Jacob Jordaan and Amy Porter into the effects of greenspace on the wellbeing of prisoners and prison staff was covered in articles in The Guardian and The Independent newspapers in 2021. She participated in a 'Locked-Up Living' podcast in 2021, talking about her research into nature contact in prison.

== Key publications ==
- Moran, D 2015 Carceral Geography: Spaces and Practices of Incarceration Ashgate, Farnham
- Moran, D, P I Jones, J A Jordaan & A E Porter 2021 Does nature contact in prison improve wellbeing? Mapping land cover to identify the effect of greenspace on self-harm and violence in prisons in England and Wales. Annals of the American Association of Geographers 111 (6): 1779-1795 DOI:10.1080/24694452.2020.1850232
- Moran, D, J Turner & A K Schliehe 2018 Conceptualising the carceral in carceral geography Progress in Human Geography 42 (5) 666-686
- Moran, D, J Turner & Y Jewkes 2016 Becoming big things: Building events and the architectural geographies of incarceration in England and Wales Transactions of the Institute of British Geographers 41 (4) 416–428
- Moran, D 2013 Carceral Geography and the Spatialities of Prison Visiting: Visitation, Recidivism and Hyperincarceration Environment and Planning: D, Society and Space 31 (1) 174-190
- Moran, D 2012 "Doing Time" in Carceral Space: TimeSpace and Carceral Geography Geografiska Annaler B 94 (4) 305–316
