= Association for Slavic, East European, and Eurasian Studies =

American scholarly society

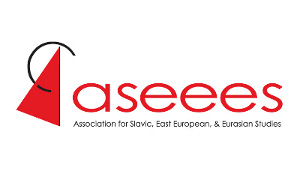
- Founded: 1948; 78 years ago
- Type: Academic Association (Non-profit)
- Location(s): 203C Bellefield Hall University of Pittsburgh, Pittsburgh, Pennsylvania, United States 15260
- Origins: Joint Committee on Slavic Studies and American Slavic and East European Review
- Region served: National and International
- Products: Slavic Review and NewsNet
- Services: ASEEES Annual Convention (every fall)
- Members: c. 3,000
- Website: aseees.org
- Formerly called: American Association for the Advancement of Slavic Studies (AAASS)

The Association for Slavic, East European, and Eurasian Studies (ASEEES) is an American scholarly society and the leading private organization dedicated to "the advancement of knowledge about Russia, Central Eurasia, and Eastern and Central Europe". ASEEES supports teaching, research, and publishing in this area. Based at the University of Pittsburgh, it is a member of the American Council of Learned Societies.

== About ==
=== Background and formation ===
In the aftermath of World War II, the face of Europe was greatly changed. A number of countries of central and eastern Europe were influenced or controlled by the Soviet Union following the defeat of Germany. Throughout the non-communist world, political decision-makers felt a need for additional academic analysis of the politics and history of the USSR and the Soviet bloc nations as well as improved facilities for language training for a new generation of foreign affairs specialists.

A number of American universities established area studies programs and research institutes in the immediate postwar period, including notably Harvard University in Cambridge, Massachusetts, Columbia University in New York City, and the University of Washington in Seattle. These institutions successfully produced the leading scholars of Slavic studies in North America. A number of graduates and professors from these programs were instrumental in forming the American Association for the Advancement of Slavic Studies (AAASS).

The organization's precursors—the Joint Committee on Slavic Studies (JCSS) and the American Slavic and East European Review (ASEER)—were two entities already in the field. The JCSS—a joint committee of the American Council of Learned Societies (ACLS) and the Social Science Research Council (SSRC)—supported scholarly conferences and publications, disbursed research and fellowship grants, and sponsored bibliographic and other projects. In 1938, the JCSS set up a subcommittee specifically for the review of Russian studies, whose chief activity was to prompt and finalize a proposal for a national professional organization. This subcommittee joined forces with ACLS's professional journal ASEER—American Slavic and East European Review, a scholarly magazine launched in 1941 by John Hazard of Columbia University. By that point, ASEER had already created a corporation named the American Association for the Advancement of Slavic Studies, Inc. (AAASS). They did so, in 1948, so as to have an "owner" (but was merely a “legal umbrella”) so that they would be permitted to print their journal in the State of New York—that year is still considered the association's official date of establishment.

Together, ASEER and JCSS coordinated the June 1, 1960, launch of a full-fledged national professional membership organization under the existing AAASS name. This new AAASS combined the activities of both the JCSS's Russian Studies subcommittee and the ASEER. However, ASEER was soon enlarged, revised, and renamed to become AAASS' own quarterly peer-reviewed journal, Slavic Review. Professor Donald Treadgold of the University of Washington was the initial editor of this new official AAASS publication. AAASS had (and continues to have) an interdisciplinary scope, and was to be a means of promoting contact and communication and of encouraging a sense of identification and association among those concerned with Russian and East European Studies. Its main functions were to distribute an annual bibliography, to sponsor professional meetings and scholarly conferences, to provide a non-juried periodic newsletter (published to promote the flow of information among society members regarding the status of ongoing research and other matters of general academic interest), and to promote and sponsor other projects designed to help the field as a whole.

=== Change of name ===
In 2008, the Association's membership voted to change the name of the AAASS, effective in 2010, to the Association for Slavic, East European, and Eurasian Studies (ASEEES). This new name reflects the Association's widened scope, rejecting the dominance of Russian and Slavic studies at a time when other former Slavic studies and Russian centers were renamed "Centers for Eurasian Studies". The change in name coincided with the move of the Association's headquarters from Harvard in Cambridge, Massachusetts, to the University of Pittsburgh in Pittsburgh, Pennsylvania.

=== Organization ===
ASEEES' national office is located at the University of Pittsburgh. It handles membership, publication subscriptions, NewsNet, and organizes and coordinates programmatic activities like the annual convention. It has six regional affiliates and a geographically committee structure to enable cooperation by members across the country. In addition, ASEEES has organizational ties with scholarly societies within the broad field of Slavic, East European, and Eurasian studies. These affiliates normally sponsor panels and hold meetings at the annual ASEEES convention.

== Membership ==
=== Individual ===
ASEEES has approximately 3,000 members and subscribers in the US and abroad.

=== Institutional ===
Institutions with programs or interests in Slavic, East European, and Eurasian studies are eligible to become institutional members of ASEEES. Over fifty institutions demonstrate their support of the field via membership in the Association. Through their representatives on the Council of Institutional Members, they exchange viewpoints and work together on issues of common concern.

== Publications ==
=== Slavic Review ===
The Slavic Review scholarly journal is ASEEES' chief publication in the field. It features articles, discussions, and reviews of recent literature that span all academic disciplines and geographic areas within "Eastern Europe, Russia, the Caucasus, and Central Asia, past and present". The Slavic Review is available on JSTOR.

The editorial offices of the Slavic Review are located at the University of Illinois, Urbana-Champaign.

=== NewsNet ===
NewsNet is ASEEES' newsletter, which carries news both of the profession and of the association and is published five times a year.

== Annual conventions ==
The annual convention is one of ASEEES' core activities. It serves as an international forum for encouraging scholarship for an average of over 2,000 attendees each year.

ASEEES (formerly AAASS) has held conventions since 1964. The first convention of the organization was held in New York City in April 1964, under the chairmanship of Professor Holland Hunter of Haverford College. Although the organization initially held these gatherings every third year so as not to sap the strength of the organization, they have been held on an annual basis for decades, hosted in a different city each year.

== Prizes and awards ==
The Association annually awards various prizes and awards which are presented at the Awards Presentation during the Annual Convention:

- Distinguished Contributions Award
- CLIR Distinguished Service Award
- Wayne S. Vucinich Book Prize
- USC Book Prize in Literary and Cultural Studies
- Reginald Zelnik Book Prize in History
- Davis Center Book Prize in Political and Social Studies
- Marshall D. Shulman Book Prize
- Ed A Hewett Book Prize
- Barbara Jelavich Book Prize
- Kulczycki Book Prize in Polish Studies
- W. Bruce Lincoln Book Prize (even-numbered years only)
- Graduate Student Essay Prize
- Tucker/Cohen Dissertation Prize

== Regional affiliates ==
Regional affiliates sponsor scholarly meetings and activities within their respective regions of the US.

- Central Slavic Conference
- Midwest Slavic Conference
- Northeast Slavic, East European, and Eurasian Conference (formerly Mid-Atlantic Slavic Conference)
- Southern Conference on Slavic Studies
- Southwest Slavic Association
- Western Association for Slavic Studies (formerly Rocky Mountain Association for Slavic Studies)

== Outlawed in Russia (2025–) ==
In June 2025, the group was outlawed by the Prosecutor-General of Russia as "undesirable".

== See also ==
- American Association of Teachers of Slavic and Eastern European Languages
- American Council of Teachers of Russian
- North American Association of Teachers of Polish (NAATPl)
- Slavistics
