= American Association of Teachers of Slavic and East European Languages =

Academic organization

The American Association of Teachers of Slavic and East European Languages (AATSEEL) is an academic organization founded in 1941. AATSEEL holds an annual conference each January and publishes the Slavic and East European Journal (SEEJ), a peer-reviewed journal of Slavic studies.

== See also ==
- Association for Slavic, East European, and Eurasian Studies (ASEEES)
- American Council of Teachers of Russian (ACTR)
- North American Association of Teachers of Polish (NAATPl)
