= Orwell Prize =

British prize for political writing

The Orwell Prize is a British prize for political writing. The Prize is awarded by The Orwell Foundation, an independent charity (Registered Charity No 1161563, formerly "The Orwell Prize") governed by a board of trustees. Five prizes are awarded each year: one each for a fiction (established 2019) and non-fiction book on politics, one for journalism, one for "Exposing Britain's Social Evils" (established 2015); between 2009 and 2012 and returning in 2026, a fifth prize was established in 2023 for reporting or commentary on homelessness. In each case, the winner is the short-listed entry which comes closest to George Orwell's own ambition to "make political writing into an art".

In 2014, the Youth Orwell Prize was launched, targeted at school years 9 to 13 in order to "support and inspire a new generation of politically engaged young writers". In 2015, The Orwell Prize for Exposing Britain's Social Evils, sponsored and supported by the Joseph Rowntree Foundation, was launched. In 2023, The Orwell Prize for Reporting Homelessness, sponsored by the Centre for Homelessness Impact, was launched.

The British political theorist Sir Bernard Crick founded The Orwell Prize in 1993, using money from the royalties of the hardback edition of his biography of Orwell. Its current sponsors are Orwell's son Richard Blair, The Political Quarterly, the Joseph Rowntree Foundation and the Orwell Estate's literary agents, A. M. Heath. The Prize was formerly sponsored by the Media Standards Trust and Reuters. Bernard Crick remained chair of the judges until 2006; since 2007, the media historian Jean Seaton has been the Director of the Prize. Judging panels for all four prizes are appointed annually.

== Winners and shortlists ==
=== The Orwell Prize for Political Fiction (2019–present) ===
Year	Author	Title	Result	Ref.
2019	Anna Burns	Milkman	Winner	
2019	Glen James Brown	Ironopolis	Shortlist	
2019	Nick Drnaso	Sabrina	Shortlist	
2019	Diana Evans	Ordinary People	Shortlist	
2019	Novuyo Rosa Tshuma	House of Stone	Shortlist	
2019	Leni Zumas	Red Clocks	Shortlist	
2020	Colson Whitehead	The Nickel Boys	Winner	
2020	Lucy Ellmann	Ducks, Newburyport	Shortlist	
2020	Bernardine Evaristo	Girl, Woman, Other	Shortlist	
2020	John Lanchester	The Wall	Shortlist	
2020	Attica Locke	Heaven, My Home	Shortlist	
2020	Edna O'Brien	Girl	Shortlist	
2021	Ali Smith	Summer	Winner	
2021	Abdulrazak Gurnah	Afterlives	Shortlist	
2021	Colum McCann	Apeirogon	Shortlist	
2021	Rumaan Alam	Leave the World Behind	Shortlist	
2021	Akwaeke Emezi	The Death of Vivek Oji	Shortlist	
2021	Brit Bennett	The Vanishing Half	Shortlist	
2022	Claire Keegan	Small Things Like These	Winner	
2022	Alice Albinia	Cwen	Shortlist	
2022	Anuk Arudpragasam	A Passage North	Shortlist	
2022	Natasha Brown	Assembly	Shortlist	
2022	Jessie Greengrass	The High House	Shortlist	
2022	Audrey Magee	The Colony	Shortlist	
2022	J. O. Morgan	Appliance	Shortlist	
2022	Yara Rodrigues Fowler	There Are More Things	Shortlist	
2022	Isabel Waidner	Sterling Karat Gold	Shortlist	
2023	Tom Crewe	The New Life	Winner	
2023	Caleb Azumah Nelson	Small Worlds	Shortlist	
2023	Eleanor Catton	Birnam Wood	Shortlist	
2023	Jonathan Coe	Bournville	Shortlist	
2023	Diana Evans	A House for Alice	Shortlist	
2023	Linda Grant	The Story of the Forest	Shortlist	
2023	Barbara Kingsolver	Demon Copperhead	Shortlist	
2023	Selby Wynn Schwartz	After Sappho	Shortlist	
2024	Hisham Matar	My Friends	Winner	
2024	Merle Collins	Ocean Stirrings	Shortlist	
2024	Percival Everett	James	Shortlist	
2024	Samantha Harvey	Orbital	Shortlist	
2024	Megan Nolan	Ordinary Human Failings	Shortlist	
2024	Andrew O'Hagan	Caledonian Road	Shortlist	
2024	Adam Thirlwell	The Future Future	Shortlist	
2024	Justin Torres	Blackouts	Shortlist	
2025	Donal Ryan	Heart, Be at Peace	Winner	
2025	Natasha Brown	Universality	Shortlist	
2025	Elif Shafak	There are Rivers in the Sky	Shortlist	
2025	Noah Eaton	The Harrow	Shortlist	
2025	Jo McMillan	The Accidental Immigrants	Shortlist	
2025	Robert Harris	Precipice	Shortlist	
2025	Edward St Aubyn	Parallel Lines	Shortlist	
2025	Chimamanda Ngozi Adichie	Dream Count	Shortlist	
2026	Ben Lerner	Transcription	Winner	
2026	Tahmima Anam	Uprising	Shortlist	
2026	I. O. Echeruo	The Comfort of Distant Stars	Shortlist	
2026	Susan Choi	Flashlight	Shortlist	
2026	Daniyal Mueenuddin	This Is Where the Serpent Lives	Shortlist	
2026	Liadan Ní Chuinn	Every One Still Here	Shortlist	
2026	Douglas Stuart	John of John	Shortlist	
2026	Stephanie Sy-Quia	A Private Man	Shortlist	

=== The Orwell Prize for Political Writing (2019–present) ===
Year	Author	Title	Result	Ref.
2019	Patrick Radden Keefe	Say Nothing: A True Story Of Murder and Memory in Northern Ireland	Winner	
2019	Oliver Bullough	Moneyland: Why Thieves and Crooks Now Rule the World and How to Take It Back	Shortlist	
2019	Francisco Cantú	The Line Becomes a River: Dispatches from the Border	Shortlist	
2019	Nora Krug	Heimat: A German Family Album	Shortlist	
2019	David Pilling	The Growth Delusion: The Wealth and Well-Being of Nations	Shortlist	
2019	Alpa Shah	Nightmarch: Among India's Revolutionary Guerrillas	Shortlist	
2020	Kate Clanchy	Some Kids I Taught and What They Taught Me	Winner	
2020	Tim Bouverie	Appeasing Hitler: Chamberlain, Churchill and the Road to War	Shortlist	
2020	Caroline Criado Perez	Invisible Women: Exposing Data Bias in a World Designed for Men	Shortlist	
2020	Amelia Gentleman	The Windrush Betrayal: Exposing the Hostile Environment	Shortlist	
2020	Robert Macfarlane	Underland: A Deep Time Journey	Shortlist	
2020	Charles Moore	Margaret Thatcher--Herself Alone: The Authorized Biography Vol. 3	Shortlist	
2020	Shoshana Zuboff	The Age of Surveillance Capitalism	Shortlist	
2021	Joshua Yaffa	Between Two Fires: Truth, Ambition and Compromise in Putin's Russia	Winner	
2021	Madeleine Bunting	Labours of Love: The Crisis of Care	Shortlist	
2021	Barbara Demick	Eat the Buddha: The Story of Modern Tibet through the People of One Town	Shortlist	
2021	Olivette Otele	African Europeans: An Untold History	Shortlist	
2021	Christina Lamb	Our Bodies, Their Battlefield: What War Does to Women	Shortlist	
2021	James Rebanks	English Pastoral: An Inheritance	Shortlist	
2021	Michael Taylor	The Interest: How the British Establishment Resisted the Abolition of Slavery	Shortlist	
2022	Sally Hayden	My Fourth Time, We Drowned	Winner	
2022	Polly Curtis	Behind Closed Doors	Shortlist	
2022	David Graeber and David Wengrow	The Dawn of Everything	Shortlist	
2022	Jeremy Farrar and Anjana Ahuja	Spike: The Virus vs The People	Shortlist	
2022	Kojo Koram	Uncommon Wealth	Shortlist	
2022	Kei Miller	Things I Have Withheld	Shortlist	
2022	Rebecca Solnit	Orwell's Roses	Shortlist	
2022	Amia Srinivasan	The Right to Sex: Feminism in the Twenty-First Century	Shortlist	
2022	Adam Tooze	Shutdown: How Covid Shook the World's Economy	Shortlist	
2022	Michela Wrong	Do Not Disturb: The Story of a Political Murder and an African Regime Gone Bad	Shortlist	
2023	Peter Apps	Show Me the Bodies: How We Let Grenfell Happen	Winner	
2023	Hannah Barnes	Time to Think: The Inside Story of the Collapse of the Tavistock's Gender Service for Children	Shortlist	
2023	Luke Harding	Invasion: Russia's Bloody War and Ukraine's Fight for Survival	Shortlist	
2023	Emily Kenway	Who Cares?: The Hidden Crisis of Caregiving, and How We Solve It	Shortlist	
2023	John McManus	Inside Qatar: Hidden Stories from One of the Richest Nations on Earth	Shortlist	
2023	Angela Saini	The Patriarchs: How Men Came to Rule	Shortlist	
2023	Philippe Sands	The Last Colony: A Tale of Exile, Justice and Britain's Colonial Legacy	Shortlist	
2023	Annabel Sowemimo	Divided: Racism, Medicine and Why We Need to Decolonise Healthcare	Shortlist	
2023	Ian Williams	Fire of the Dragon: China's New Cold War	Shortlist	
2024	Matthew Longo	The Picnic	Winner	
2024	Cat Bohannon	Eve: How the Female Body Drove 200 Million Years of Human Evolution	Shortlist	
2024	Steve Coll	The Achilles Trap	Shortlist	
2024	Daniel Finkelstein	Hitler, Stalin, Mum and Dad: A Family Memoir of Miraculous Survival	Shortlist	
2024	Jason Okundaye	Revolutionary Acts: Love & Brotherhood in Black Gay Britain	Shortlist	
2024	Alpa Shah	The Incarcerations	Shortlist	
2024	Lyndsey Stonebridge	We Are Free to Change the World	Shortlist	
2024	Nathan Thrall	A Day in the Life of Abed Salama: A Palestine Story	Shortlist	
2024	Yaroslav Trofimov	Our Enemies Will Vanish: The Russian Invasion and Ukraine's War of Independence	Shortlist	
2025	Victoria Amelina	Looking at Women, Looking at War	Winner	
2025	Vladislav Zubok	The World of the Cold War: 1945–1991	Shortlist	
2025	Simon Parkin	The Forbidden Garden of Leningrad	Shortlist	
2025	Gabriel Gatehouse	The Coming Storm: A Journey into the Heart of the Conspiracy Machine	Shortlist	
2025	Lucy Ash	The Baton and the Cross	Shortlist	
2025	Mishal Husain	Broken Threads	Shortlist	
2025	Anne Applebaum	Autocracy Inc.	Shortlist	
2025	Edward Wong	At the Edge of Empire	Shortlist	
2026	Karen Bartlett	The Escape From Kabul	Winner	
2026	Sam Dalrymple	Shattered Lands	Shortlist	
2026	Omer Bartov	Israel: What Went Wrong?	Shortlist	
2026	Nilo Tabrizy and Fatemeh Jamalpour	For the Sun After Long Nights	Shortlist	
2026	Andrey Kurkov	Three Years on Fire	Shortlist	
2026	Yi-Ling Liu	The Wall Dancers	Shortlist	
2026	Nicolas Niarchos	The Elements of Power	Shortlist	
2026	Antonia Senior	Stalin's Apostles	Shortlist	

=== Combined book category (1994–2018) ===
Beginning with 2019, the Book prize was split into fiction and non-fiction categories.

Year	Author	Title	Result	Ref.
1994	Anatol Lieven	The Baltic Revolution: Estonia, Latvia, Lithuania and the Path to Independence	Winner	
1995	Fionnuala O'Connor	In Search of a State: Catholics in Northern Ireland	Winner	
1996	Fergal Keane	Season of Blood: A Rwandan Journey	Winner	
1997	Peter Godwin	Mukiwa: A White Boy in Africa	Winner	
1998	Patricia Hollis	Jennie Lee: A Life	Winner	
1999	D. M. Thomas	Alexander Solzhenitsyn: a Century in His Life	Winner	
2000	Brian Cathcart	The Case of Stephen Lawrence	Winner	
2001	Michael Ignatieff	Virtual War	Winner	
2002	Miranda Carter	Anthony Blunt: His Lives	Winner	
2003	Francis Wheen	Hoo-hahs and Passing Frenzies: Collected Journalism 1991–2000	Winner	
2003	Matthew Parris	Chance Witness: An Outsider's Life in Politics	Shortlist	
2003	Iain Sinclair	London Orbital: A Walk Around the M25	Shortlist	
2003	Robert Gildea	Marianne in Chains: In Search of the German Occupation 1940-45	Shortlist	
2003	Richard Weight	Patriots: National Identity in Britain 1940-2000	Shortlist	
2003	Neal Ascherson	Stone Voices: The Search for Scotland	Shortlist	
2004	Robert Cooper	The Breaking of Nations: Order and Chaos in the Twenty-First Century	Winner	
2004	Monica Ali	Brick Lane	Shortlist	
2004	John Campbell	Margaret Thatcher: Volume Two: The Iron Lady	Shortlist	
2004	Norman Davies	Rising '44: The Battle For Warsaw	Shortlist	
2004	Hugo Young	Supping with the Devils: Political Journalism from Thatcher to Blair	Shortlist	
2003	Michael Collins	The Likes of Us: A Biography of the White Working Class	Winner	
2003	Timothy Garton Ash	Free World	Shortlist	
2003	Helena Kennedy	Just Law	Shortlist	
2003	Andrew Marr	My Trade: A Short History of British Journalism	Shortlist	
2003	Ian Buruma & Avishai Margalit	Occidentalism: A Short History of Anti-Westernism	Shortlist	
2003	Juliet Gardiner	Wartime: Britain 1939-1945	Shortlist	
2004	Delia Jarrett-Macauley	Moses, Citizen and Me	Winner	
2004	Bernard Hare	Urban Grimshaw and the Shed Crew	Shortlist	
2004	Richard Webster	The Secret of Bryn Estyn: The Making of a Modern Witch Hunt	Shortlist	
2004	Michela Wrong	I Didn't Do It For You: How the World Used and Abused a Small African Nation	Shortlist	
2004	David Loyn	Frontline: The True Story of the British Mavericks Who Changed the Face of War Reporting	Shortlist	
2004	Ekow Eshun	Black Gold of the Sun: Searching for Home in England and Africa	Shortlist	
2007	Peter Hennessy	Having It So Good: Britain in the 1950s	Winner	
2007	Simon Jenkins	Thatcher and Sons: A Revolution in Three Acts	Shortlist	
2007	Rory Stewart	Occupational Hazards: My Time Governing in Iraq	Shortlist	
2007	Lewis Page	Lions, Donkeys And Dinosaurs: Waste and Blundering in the Military	Shortlist	
2007	Carmen Callil	Bad Faith: A Forgotten History of Family and Fatherland	Shortlist	
2007	Hugh Brogan	Alexis de Tocqueville: Prophet of Democracy in the Age of Revolution	Shortlist	
2008	Raja Shehadeh	Palestinian Walks: Forays into a Vanishing Landscape	Winner	
2008	Nick Cohen	What's Left?	Shortlist	
2008	Jay Griffiths	Wild	Shortlist	
2008	William Hague	William Wilberforce	Shortlist	
2008	Ed Husain	The Islamist	Shortlist	
2008	Marina Lewycka	Two Caravans	Shortlist	
2008	Clive Stafford Smith	Bad Men	Shortlist	
2009	Andrew Brown	Fishing in Utopia: Sweden and the future that disappeared	Winner	
2009	Tony Judt	Reappraisals: Reflections on the Forgotten Twentieth Century	Shortlist	
2009	Owen Matthews	Stalin's Children: Three Generations of Love and War	Shortlist	
2009	Hsiao-Hung Pai	Chinese Whispers: The True Story Behind Britain's Hidden Army of Labour	Shortlist	
2009	Ahmed Rashid	Descent into Chaos: The United States and the Failure of Nation Building in Pakistan, Afghanistan and Central Asia	Shortlist	
2009	Mark Thompson	The White War: Life and Death on the Italian Front 1915–1918	Shortlist	
2010	Andrea Gillies	Keeper	Winner	
2010	Christopher de Bellaigue	Rebel Land: Among Turkey's Forgotten Peoples	Shortlist	
2010	Petina Gappah	An Elegy for Easterly	Shortlist	
2010	John Kampfner	Freedom For Sale: How We Made Money and Lost Our Liberty	Shortlist	
2010	Kenan Malik	From Fatwa to Jihad: The Rushdie Affair and Its Legacy	Shortlist	
2010	Michela Wrong	t's Our Turn to Eat: The Story of a Kenyan Whistle Blower	Shortlist	
2011	Tom Bingham	The Rule of Law	Winner	
2011	Afsaneh Moqadam	Death to the Dictator!: Witnessing Iran's election and the Crippling of the Islamic Republic	Shortlist	
2011	Christopher Hitchens	Hitch-22	Shortlist	
2011	Oliver Bullough	Let Our Fame Be Great: Journeys among the defiant people of the Caucasus	Shortlist	
2011	D. R. Thorpe	Supermac: The Life of Harold Macmillan	Shortlist	
2011	Helen Dunmore	The Betrayal	Shortlist	
2012	Toby Harnden	Dead Men Risen	Winner	
2012	Misha Glenny	DarkMarket: CyberThieves, CyberCops and You	Shortlist	
2012	Gavin Knight	Hood Rat	Shortlist	
2012	Richard Lloyd Parry	People Who Eat Darkness: The Fate of Lucie Blackman	Shortlist	
2012	Siddhartha Deb	The Beautiful and the Damned: Life in the New India	Shortlist	
2012	Julia Lovell	The Opium War	Shortlist	
2013	A. T. Williams	A Very British Killing: The Death of Baha Mousa	Winner	
2013	Carmen Bugan	Burying the Typewriter	Shortlist	
2013	Pankaj Mishra	From the Ruins of the Empire	Shortlist	
2013	Clive Stafford Smith	Injustice	Shortlist	
2013	Richard Holloway	Leaving Alexandria	Shortlist	
2013	Raja Shehadeh	Occupation Diaries	Shortlist	
2013	Marie Colvin	On the Front Line: The Collected Journalism of Marie Colvin	Shortlist	
2014	Alan Johnson	This Boy: A Memoir of a Childhood	Winner	
2014	Gaiutra Bahadur	Coolie Woman	Shortlist	
2014	Charles Moore	Not for Turning	Shortlist	
2014	David Goodhart	The British Dream	Shortlist	
2014	Frank Dikötter	The Tragedy of Liberation	Shortlist	
2014	James Fergusson	The World's Most Dangerous Place	Shortlist	
2015	James Meek	Private Island: Why Britain Now Belongs to Someone Else	Winner	
2015	Rana Dasgupta	Capital: The Eruption of Delhi	Shortlist	
2015	Nick Davies	Hack Attack: How the Truth Caught Up with Rupert Murdoch	Shortlist	
2015	Dan Davies	In Plain Sight: The Life and Lies of Jimmy Savile	Shortlist	
2015	David Kynaston	Modernity Britain: Opening the Box, 1957–1959	Shortlist	
2015	Louisa Lim	People's Republic of Amnesia: Tiananmen Revisited	Shortlist	
2016	Arkady Ostrovsky	The Invention of Russia	Winner	
2016	Wendell Steavenson	Circling the Square	Shortlist	
2016	John Kay	Other People's Money	Shortlist	
2016	Jason Burke	The New Threat from Islamic Militancy	Shortlist	
2016	Ferdinand Mount	The Tears of the Rajas	Shortlist	
2016	Emma Sky	The Unravelling	Shortlist	
2017	John Bew	Citizen Clem: A Biography of Attlee	Winner	
2017	Ruth Dudley Edwards	The Seven: The Lives and Legacies of the Founding Fathers of the Irish Republic	Shortlist	
2017	Tim Shipman	All Out War: The Full Story of How Brexit Sank Britain's Political Class	Shortlist	
2017	J. D. Taylor	Island Story: Journeys Around Unfamiliar Britain	Shortlist	
2017	Adrian Tempany	And the Sun Shines Now: How Hillsborough and the Premier League Changed Britain	Shortlist	
2017	Gary Younge	Another Day in the Death of America: A Chronicle of Ten Short Lives	Shortlist	
2018	Darren McGarvey	Poverty Safari	Winner	
2018	Christopher de Bellaigue	The Islamic Enlightenment: The Modern Struggle Between Faith and Reason	Shortlist	
2018	Cordelia Fine	Testosterone Rex	Shortlist	
2018	Mark Mazower	What You Did Not Tell	Shortlist	
2018	Ali Smith	Winter	Shortlist	
2018	Clair Wills	Lovers and Strangers: An Immigrant History of Post-War Britain	Shortlist	

=== The Orwell Prize for Journalism (1994–present) ===
Year	Recipients	Result	Ref.
1994	Neal Ascherson	Winner	
1995	Paul Foot	Winner	
1995	Tim Laxton	Winner	
1996	Melanie Phillips	Winner	
1997	Ian Bell	Winner	
1998	Polly Toynbee	Winner	
1999	Robert Fisk	Winner	
2000	David McKittrick	Winner	
2001	David Aaronovitch	Winner	
2002	Yasmin Alibhai-Brown	Winner	
2003	Brian Sewell	Winner	
2004	Vanora Bennett	Winner	
2005	Matthew Parris	Winner	
2006	Timothy Garton Ash	Winner	
2006	Steve Richards	Shortlist	
2006	Oliver Burkeman	Shortlist	
2006	Lesley Riddoch	Shortlist	
2006	Jonathan Freedland	Shortlist	
2006	Bronwen Maddox	Shortlist	
2007	Peter Beaumont	Winner	
2007	John Rentoul	Shortlist	
2007	Martin Bright	Shortlist	
2007	Peter Hitchens	Shortlist	
2008	Johann Hari (revoked in 2011)	Winner	
2008	Clive James	Shortlist	
2008	Anton La Guardia	Shortlist	
2008	Andrew Rawnsley	Shortlist	
2008	Mary Riddell	Shortlist	
2008	Paul Vallely	Shortlist	
2009	Patrick Cockburn	Winner	
2009	Peter Oborne	Shortlist	
2009	Peter Hitchens	Shortlist	
2009	Henry Porter	Shortlist	
2009	Donald Macintyre	Shortlist	
2009	Catherine Bennett	Shortlist	
2010	Peter Hitchens	Winner	
2010	Paul Lewis	Shortlist	
2010	John Arlidge	Shortlist	
2010	Hamish McRae	Shortlist	
2010	David Reynolds	Shortlist	
2010	Anthony Loyd	Shortlist	
2010	Amelia Gentleman	Shortlist	
2011	Jenni Russell	Winner	
2011	Rachel Shabi	Shortlist	
2011	Philip Collins	Shortlist	
2011	Gideon Rachman	Shortlist	
2011	Declan Walsh	Shortlist	
2011	Catherine Mayer	Shortlist	
2011	Amelia Gentleman	Shortlist	
2012	Amelia Gentleman	Winner	
2012	Edward Docx	Shortlist	
2012	Daniel Finkelstein	Shortlist	
2012	David James Smith	Shortlist	
2012	Simon Kuper	Shortlist	
2012	Paul Lewis	Shortlist	
2013	Andrew Norfolk	Winner	
2013	Tom Bergin	Winner	
2013	Kim Sengupta	Shortlist	
2013	Jamil Anderlini	Shortlist	
2013	Ian Cobain	Shortlist	
2013	Christina Patterson	Shortlist	
2014	Ghaith Abdul-Ahad	Winner	
2014	James Astill	Shortlist	
2014	Jonathan Freedland	Shortlist	
2014	Aditya Chakrabortty	Shortlist	
2014	Mary Riddell	Shortlist	
2014	A. A. Gill	Shortlist	
2014	Gideon Rachman	Shortlist	
2015	Martin Chulov	Winner	
2015	Rosie Blau	Shortlist	
2015	Rebecca Omonira-Oyekanmi	Shortlist	
2015	Peter Ross	Shortlist	
2015	Mary Riddell	Shortlist	
2015	Kim Sengupta	Shortlist	
2016	Iona Craig	Winner	
2016	Gideon Rachman	Winner	
2016	Douglas Murray	Shortlist	
2016	Oliver Bullough	Shortlist	
2016	David Gardner	Shortlist	
2016	Shiraz Maher	Shortlist	
2016	Louise Tickle	Shortlist	
2017	Fintan O'Toole	Winner	
2017	Rosie Blau	Shortlist	
2017	Carole Cadwalladr	Shortlist	
2017	Aditya Chakrabortty	Shortlist	
2017	Nick Cohen	Shortlist	
2017	John Harris	Shortlist	
2017	Paul Wood	Shortlist	
2018	Carole Cadwalladr	Winner	
2018	Edward Carr	Shortlist	
2018	Sam Knight	Shortlist	
2018	Anthony Loyd	Shortlist	
2018	Jack Shenker	Shortlist	
2018	Janice Turner	Shortlist	
2019	Suzanne Moore	Winner	
2019	Steve Bloomfield	Winner	
2020	Janice Turner	Winner	
2020	John Harris and John Domokos	Nominee	
2021	John Harris and John Domokos	Winner	
2021	George Arbuthnott and Jonathan Calvert	Shortlist	
2021	Chloe Hadjimatheou	Shortlist	
2021	Tom McTague	Shortlist	
2021	Sarah O'Connor	Shortlist	
2021	Megha Rajagopalan and Alison Killing	Shortlist	
2021	Gary Younge	Shortlist	
2022	George Monbiot	Winner	
2022	Ali Fowle, Aun Qi Koh, and Drew Ambrose	Shortlist	
2022	Billy Perrigo	Shortlist	
2022	Daniel Trilling	Shortlist	
2022	Gabriel Gatehouse and Lucy Proctor	Shortlist	
2023	Gary Younge	Winner	
2023	Paul Caruana Galizia and Katie Gunning	Shortlist	
2023	Isobel Cockerell	Shortlist	
2023	Helen Lewis	Shortlist	
2023	Yogita Limaye with Imogen Anderson, Sanjay Ganguly and Malik Mudassir Hassan	Shortlist	
2023	Sean Morrison	Shortlist	
2023	Madeleine Schwartz	Shortlist	
2023	Quentin Sommerville	Shortlist	
2023	Wendell Steavenson	Shortlist	
2024	Wendell Steavenson	Winner	
2024	Heidi Blake	Shortlist	
2024	Antonia Cundy	Shortlist	
2024	Sophie Elmherst	Shortlist	
2024	James Meek	Shortlist	
2024	Nicolas Pelham	Shortlist	
2024	David Pilling	Shortlist	
2024	Kavita Puri	Shortlist	
2024	David de Simone	Shortlist	
2025	Jenny Kleeman	Winner	
2025	Hannah Barnes	Shortlist	
2025	Alexander Clapp	Shortlist	
2025	Dani Garavelli	Shortlist	
2025	Andrew Harding	Shortlist	
2025	Sarah O'Connor	Shortlist	
2025	Arkady Ostrovsky	Shortlist	
2025	Charles Thomson	Shortlist	
2025	Mark Townsend	Shortlist	

=== The Orwell Prize for Exposing Britain's Social Evils (2015–present) ===
Year	Author	Title	Publisher	Result	Ref.
2015	Alison Holt	Care of the elderly and vulnerable	BBC	Winner	
2015	Randeep Ramesh	Casino, style Gambling as a Social Ill		Shortlist	
2015	Nick Mathiason	A Great British Housing Crisis		Shortlist	
2015	Mark Townsend	Serco: a hunt for the truth inside Yarl's Wood		Shortlist	
2015	George Arbuthnott	Slaves in peril on the sea		Shortlist	
2015	Aditya Chakrabortty	London Housing Crisis		Shortlist	
2016	Nicci Gerrard	Words fail us: Dementia and the arts		Winner	
2016	Sally Gainsbury, Sarah Neville, and John Burn-Murdoch	The Austerity State	Financial Times	Shortlist	
2016	Jackie Long, Job Rabkin, and Lee Sorrell	Detention Undercover: Inside Yarl's Wood	Channel 4	Shortlist	
2016	Michael Buchanan	Investigation into NHS Failings		Shortlist	
2016	David Cohen, Matt Writtle, and Kiran Mensah	The Estate We're In	Evening Standard	Shortlist	
2016	David Leigh, James Ball, Juliette Garside, and David Pegg	The HSBC Files	The Guardian	Shortlist	
2017	Felicity Lawrence	The gangsters on England's doorstep	The Guardian	Winner	
2017	Billy Kenber	Drug profiteering exposed	The Times	Shortlist	
2017	Tom Warren, Jane Bradley, and Richard Holmes	The RBS Dash for Cash	BuzzFeed News	Shortlist	
2017	Ros Wynne-Jones	Real Britain	Daily Mirror	Shortlist	
2017	Mark Townsend	From Brighton the Battlefield	The Guardian	Shortlist	
2017	Anna Hall, Erica Gornal, and Louise Tickle	Behind Closed Doors	True Vision Aire and The Guardian	Shortlist	
2018	Sarah O'Connor, John Burn-Murdoch, and Christopher Nunn	On the Edge	Financial Times	Winner	
2018	Andy Davies, Anja Popp, and Dai Bakera	Her Name Was Lindy	Channel 4 News	Shortlist	
2018	Joe Plomin	Behind Locked Doors	BBC Panorama	Shortlist	
2018	Patrick Strudwick	This Man Had His Leg Broken in Four Places Because He Is Gay	BuzzFeed UK	Shortlist	
2018	Mark Townsend	Four young black men die: were they killed by the police?	The Observer	Shortlist	
2018	Jennifer Williams	Spice	Manchester Evening News	Shortlist	
2019	Max Daly	Behind County Lines	Vice	Winner	
2020	Ian Birrell			Winner	
2021	Annabel Deas	Hope High	BBC Radio 5 Live	Winner	
2021	Robert Wright	Behind Closed Doors: Modern Slavery in Kensington	The Financial Times	Shortlist	
2021	Sirin Kale	Lost to the Virus	The Guardian	Shortlist	
2021	Simon Akam	Britain and the Pandemic	1843	Shortlist	
2021	Tom Kelly, Susie Coen, and Sophie Borland	Exposing the Care Homes Catastrophe	Mail Investigation Team	Shortlist	
2021	Jane Bradley and Amanda Taub	Failings in Britain Leave Victims of Domestic Violence in Peril	The New York Times	Shortlist	
2021	Richard Watson	Hate Crime	BBC Newsnight	Shortlist	
2022	Ed Thomas	The Cost of Covid - Burnley Crisis	BBC News	Winner	
2023	Shanti Das	Migrant care workers	The Observer	Winner	
2023	Mark Townsend	Child asylum seekers	The Observer	Winner	

=== The Orwell Prize for Reporting Homelessness (2023–present) ===
Year	Author	Result	Ref.
2026	London Centric	Winner	
2026	Asha Bird, SW Londoner, Ilford Recorder Tom Burgess, BBC News, BBC Radio 4 London Centric Joseph Phelan, The Big Issue Andrew Seaton, The New Statesman Damian Shepherd, Bloomberg UK Katharine Swindells, Inside Housing Mimi Yates, The Daily Mail	Shortlist	
2025	Simon Murphy	Winner	
2025	Greg Barradale	Shortlist	
2025	Niall Christie	Shortlist	
2025	David Cohen	Shortlist	
2025	Luke Donnelly, Callum Cuddeford, Facundo Arrizabalaga, Adrian Zorzut, Jake Holden, Harrison Galliven and Adam Toms	Shortlist	
2025	Daniel Hewitt, David Williams, Imogen Barrer	Shortlist	
2025	Vicky Spratt	Shortlist	
2025	Katharine Swindells	Shortlist	
2025	Liam Thorp	Shortlist	
2024	Unheard Voices	Winner	
2024	Holly Bancroft	Shortlist	
2024	Daniel Hewitt, Imogen Barrett and Mariah Cooper	Shortlist	
2024	Hannah Silva	Shortlist	
2024	Vicky Spratt	Shortlist	
2024	Liam Thorp	Shortlist	
2024	David Tovey	Shortlist	
2024	Kwajo Tweneboa	Shortlist	
2023	Freya Marshall Payne	Winner	
2023	Daniel Lavelle	Winner	
2023	Carolyn Atkinson	Shortlist	
2023	Lucy Campbell	Shortlist	
2023	Daniel Hewitt	Shortlist	
2023	Zohra Naciri	Shortlist	
2023	Jack Simpson	Shortlist	
2023	Vicky Spratt	Shortlist	
2023	Daniel Trilling	Shortlist	

=== Blog category (2009–2012) ===
Year	Author	Title	Result	Ref.
2009	Richard Horton	NightJack: An English Detective	Winner	
2009	Iain Dale		Shortlist	
2009	Paul Mason		Shortlist	
2009	Alix Mortimer		Shortlist	
2009	Owen Polley		Shortlist	
2009	Andrew Sparrow		Shortlist	
2010	Winston Smith (pseudonym)	Working with the Underclass	Winner	
2010	David Allen Green	Jack of Kent	Shortlist	
2010	Tim Marshall	Foreign Matters	Shortlist	
2010	Madam Miaow (pseudonym)	Madam Miaow says: Of culture, pop-culture and petri dishes	Shortlist	
2010	Laurie Penny	Penny Red and others	Shortlist	
2010	Hopi Sen	Hopi Sen	Shortlist	
2011	Graeme Archer		Winner	
2011	Molly Bennett		Shortlist	
2011	Cath Elliott		Shortlist	
2011	Daniel Hannan		Shortlist	
2011	Nelson Jones		Shortlist	
2011	Paul Mason		Shortlist	
2011	Duncan McLaren (author)		Shortlist	
2012	Rangers Tax Case		Winner	
2012	Lisa Ansell	Lisa Ansell	Shortlist	
2012	Ms Baroque (pseudonym)	Baroque in Hackney	Shortlist	
2012	BendyGirl (pseudonym)	Benefit Scrounging Scum	Shortlist	
2012	Alex Massie	Alex Massie	Shortlist	
2012	Rebecca Omonira-Oyekanmi	Rebecca Omonira-Oyekanmi	Shortlist	
2012	Wiggy (pseudonym)	Beneath The Wig	Shortlist	

== Special prizes ==
In addition to the four regular prizes, the judges may choose to award a special prize.

In 2007, BBC's Newsnight programme was given a special prize, the judges noting, "When we were discussing the many very fine pieces of journalism that were submitted Newsnight just spontaneously emerged in our deliberations as the most precious and authoritative home for proper reporting of important stories, beautifully and intelligently crafted by journalists of rare distinction."

In 2008, Clive James was given a special award.

In 2009, Tony Judt was given a lifetime achievement award.

In 2012, a posthumous award was made to Christopher Hitchens, his book Arguably having been longlisted that year.

In 2013, Marie Colvin received a special prize for On the Front Line. She had been killed earlier that year while on assignment in Homs, Syria.

In 2014, the Guardian columnist Jonathan Freedland was given a special award, after having been shortlisted for the Journalism Prize that year.

In 2023, photographer Craig Easton was given a special award for his long term commitment to 'exposing Britain's social evils' for his work Thatcher's Children.

== Controversy ==
In 2008 the winner in the Journalism category was Johann Hari. In July 2011 the Council of the Orwell Prize decided to revoke Hari's award and withdraw the prize. Public announcement was delayed as Hari was then under investigation by The Independent for professional misconduct. In September 2011 Hari announced that he was returning his prize "as an act of contrition for the errors I made elsewhere, in my interviews", although he "stands by the articles that won the prize". A few weeks later, the Council of the Orwell Prize confirmed that Hari had returned the plaque but not the £2,000 prize money, and issued a statement that one of the articles submitted for the prize, "How multiculturalism is betraying women", published by The Independent in April 2007, "contained inaccuracies and conflated different parts of someone else's story (specifically, a report in Der Spiegel)".

Hari did not initially return the prize money of £2,000. He later offered to repay the money, but Political Quarterly, responsible for paying the prize money in 2008, instead invited Hari to make a donation to English PEN, of which George Orwell was a member. Hari arranged with English PEN to make a donation equal to the value of the prize, to be paid in installments once Hari returned to work at The Independent. However, Hari did not return to work at The Independent.
