= James Ferguson =

James Ferguson may refer to:

== Entertainment ==
- Jim Ferguson (born 1948), American jazz and classical guitarist
- Jim Ferguson, American guitarist, past member of Lotion
- Jim Ferguson, American film critic, board of directors member for the Broadcast Film Critics Association
- Jimmy Ferguson (1940–1997), Irish-Canadian singer, member of The Irish Rovers

== Politics ==
- James Ferguson, 1st Laird of Pitfour (1672–1734)
- James Ferguson, Lord Pitfour (1700–1777)
- James Ferguson (Scottish politician) (1735–1820), Scottish Tory politician
- James Burne Ferguson, New Zealand politician in 1850s
- James E. Ferguson (1871–1944), governor of Texas
- James Ferguson (Australian politician) (1908–1975), South Australian House of Assembly
- James Ferguson (Canadian politician) (1925–2013), Canadian politician from Manitoba
- James Ferguson (diplomat) (1940–2026), Australian diplomat
- James Leo Ferguson, Bangladeshi politician
- J. Leo Ferguson, Bahamian politician
- Jim Ferguson, British politician

== Science ==
- James Ferguson (Scottish astronomer) (1710–1776), Scottish astronomer and instrument maker
- James Ferguson (American astronomer) (1797–1867), American astronomer and engineer
- James Haig Ferguson (1862–1934), Scottish gynaecologist
- James Ferguson (anthropologist) (1959–2025), American anthropologist

== Sports ==
- James Ferguson (cricketer) (1848–1913), Australian cricketer
- Jim Ferguson (footballer) (1896–1952), Scottish professional football goalkeeper
- Jim Ferguson (American football) (born 1942), American football player
- James Ferguson (Cowdenbeath and Dumbarton footballer), Scottish footballer
- James Ferguson (Queen's Park footballer), Scottish footballer
- James Ferguson (water polo) (born 1949), American water polo player
- Jimmy Ferguson (footballer) (born 1935), Scottish football goalkeeper
- Jim Ferguson (weightlifter) (born 1938), Scottish weightlifter

== Other ==
- James Ferguson (minister) (1621–1667), Scottish minister
- James Ferguson (Scottish general) (died 1705), Scottish major-general
- James Frederic Ferguson (1807–1855), Irish antiquarian
- James Ferguson (American general) (1913–2000), U.S. Air Force general
- James E. Ferguson II (1942–2025), American civil rights lawyer

== See also ==
- Ferguson (name)
- James Fergusson (disambiguation)
- James Ferguson Conant (born 1958), American philosopher
- James Ferguson Dowdell (1818–1871), U.S. representative from Alabama
