= Rajiv Mohabir =

Indo-Caribbean American poet

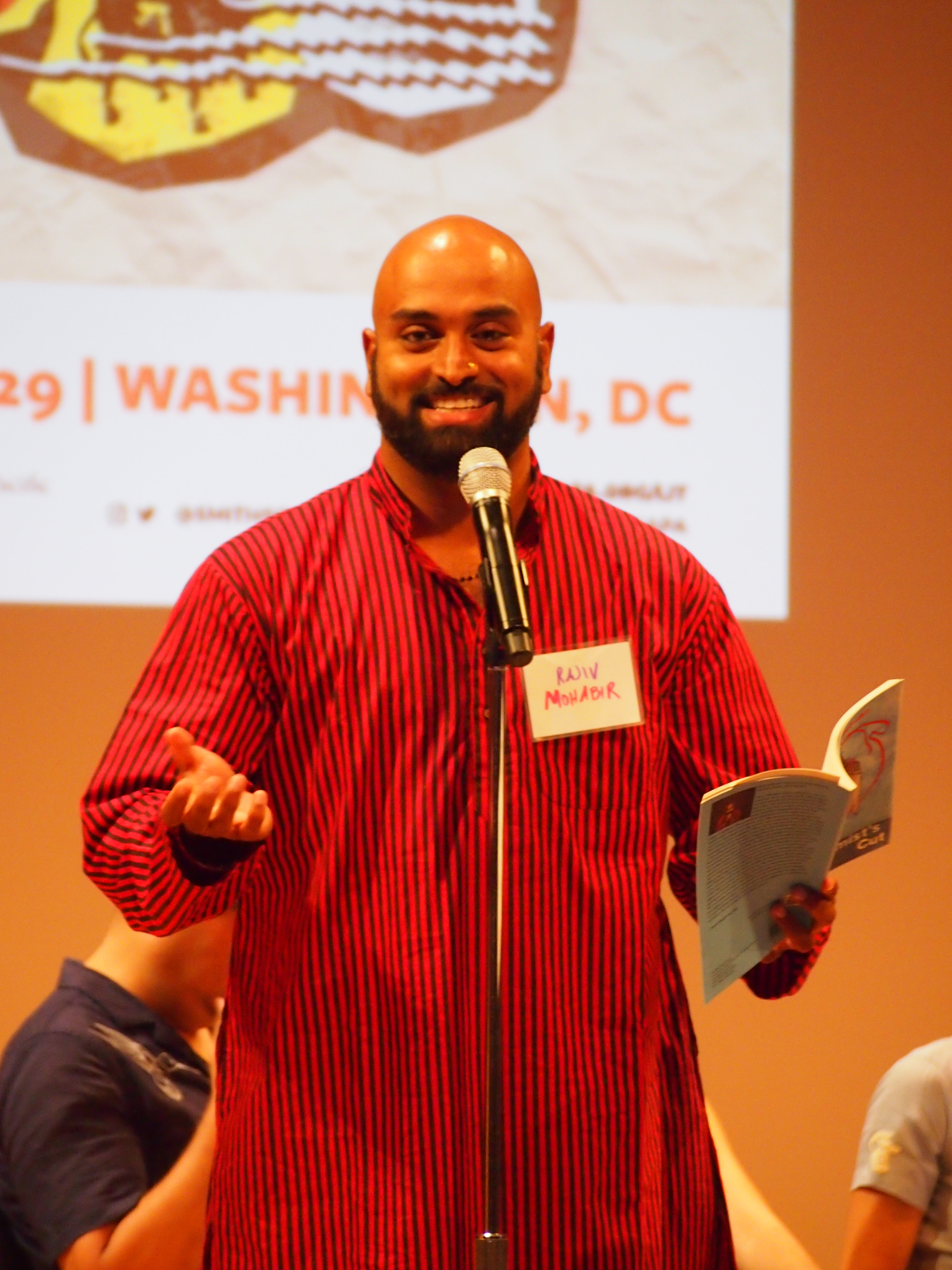
- Mohabir in 2017
- Born: London, England
- Education: Queens College, CUNY (M.F.A.); University of Hawai'i (Ph.D.)
- Occupations: Poet, translator, academic
- Employer: University of Colorado Boulder
- Writing career
- Genre: Poetry
- Notable works: The Taxidermist's Cut; The Cowherd's Son; Cutlish
- Notable awards: Harold Morton Landon Translation Award; finalist, National Book Critics Circle Award for Poetry

Rajiv Mohabir is an Indo-Caribbean American poet and translator. He is the author of several poetry collections and chapbooks, as well as the memoir Antiman. He is an assistant professor of poetry in the Department of English at the University of Colorado Boulder.

== Early life and education ==
Mohabir was born in London, England. Soon after, his family moved to Toronto, Canada, and then to Chuluota, Florida, United States, where he spent most of his formative years.

In Queens, New York, he taught ESL as community empowerment for immigrants. "It was also disheartening to know all the obstacles they had to deal with in order to make something of themselves," he says. "I had been there myself." When he lived in New York, he produced the nationally broadcast radio show KAVIhouse on JusPunjabi.

Mohabir is fluent in Hindi, Bhojpuri and a dying language known as Guyanese Hindustani.

Mohabir has a BA from the University of Florida in religious studies and an MSEd in Teaching English to Speakers of Other Languages from Long Island University, Brooklyn. Mohabir received his MFA in Poetry and Translation from Queens College, CUNY. He has a PhD in English from the University of Hawai`i. He was formerly an Assistant Professor of Poetry at Auburn University.

About his bevy of learned disciplines, Mohabir said in an interview with Kundiman,

"I have never thought of these things as disconnected—in fact the music I came to poetry from was religious/cultural. I wonder if it’s the academy that tries to separate them. I see a connection in things poetic as far as my community is concerned. My voice is witness, connecting seemingly disparate 'fields of study.' For me they all happen simultaneously. Religion, language, spirituality, poetry together make my black ink. I can’t disaggregate my own being into constituent parts to say, this is the queer part, this is the spiritual part, this is the materially obsessed part, this is the Caribbean part, this is the Bhojpuri part, this is the Tamilian part…the list goes on forever. To be a queer immigrant of color is to be at one with the paradoxes around you. I choose to write into these paradoxes, to see what kind of tensions emerge."

== Poetry ==
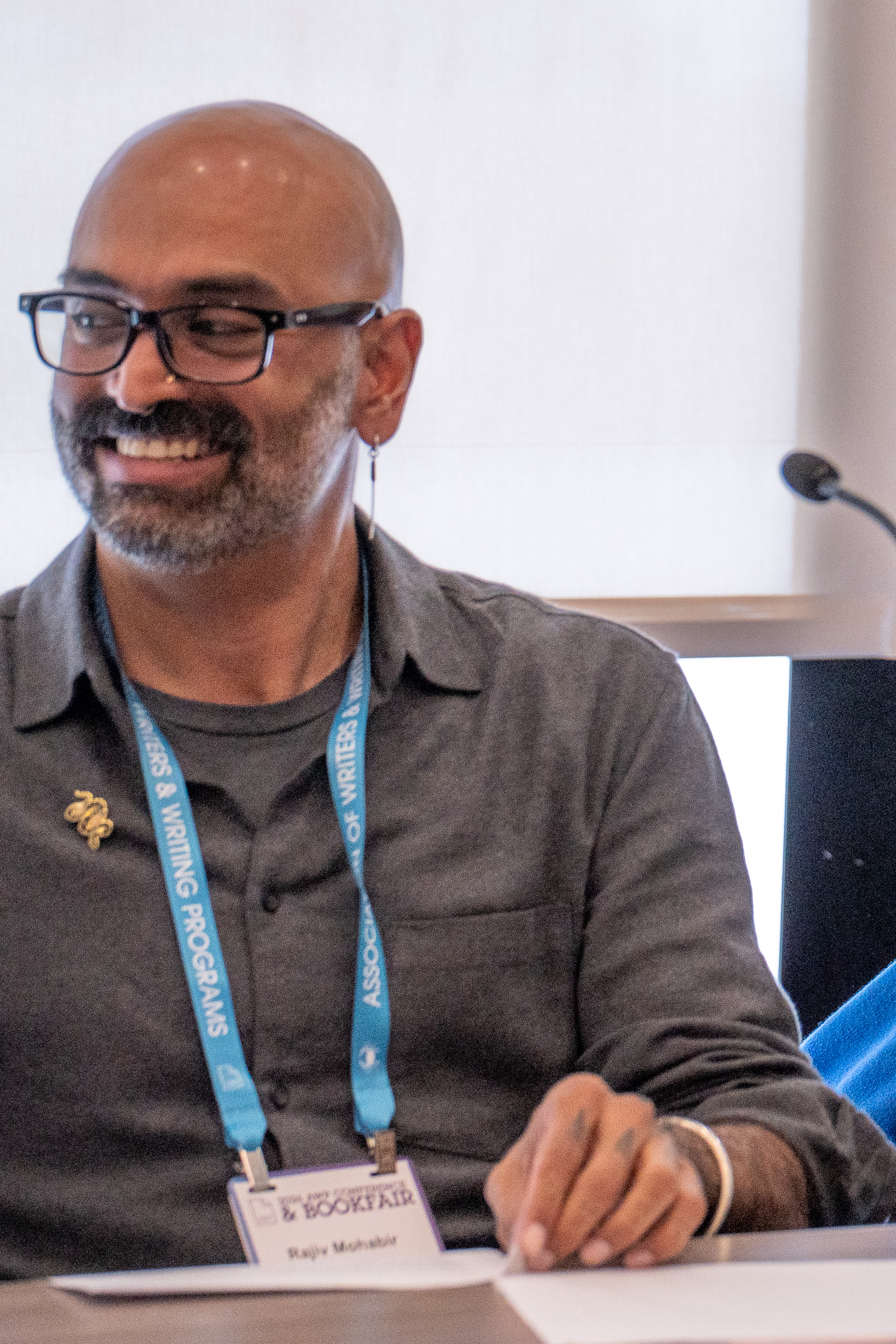
Mohabir at AWP 2026

Mohabir is the author of The Taxidermist's Cut, published by Four Way Books in 2016, and The Cowherd's Son, which was the winner of the 2015 Kundiman Poetry Prize and was published by Tupelo Press in 2017.

The Rumpus said: "Mohabir's The Taxidermist’s Cut is a collection of destruction and reconstruction, and we the readers are left among the moonlit ruins, with a strange ache of recognition." Publishers Weekly said: "In his excellent debut, Mohabir exposes desire and inner turmoil through the measured incantations of a queer, Indian-American voice that refuses the burdens of a homophobic and racist world."

In a starred review for The Cowherd's Son, Publishers Weekly said: "Mohabir continues to demonstrate an uncanny ability to compose exacting, tactile poems that musically leap off the page...Mohabir offers much to appreciate, and even among the strife he records, there is a yearning for and pursuit of joy."

The Los Angeles Review of Books said: "The Cowherd’s Son is an impressive collection marked by honest vulnerability. It humbly displays a harrowed family history and the ensuing feeling of being an outlier. Struggles with homophobia, racism, violence, and xenophobia all serve to help the speaker achieve a deeper sense of self-acceptance. Ultimately, The Cowherd’s Son enlists darkness to empower the potential for goodness." Gulf Stream said, "Throughout the collection there are profound scenes where Mohabir lets us into the speaker’s mouth, the speaker’s bed, where we can see how much the weight of heritage affects his intimate life. This tension between epic gesture and private stillness pushes the collection forward and transcends setting, making The Cowherd’s Son an incredible symphony of movement and place, where identity is constantly redefined and reimagined in the context of historical memory."

Mohabir often includes Bhojpuri or Hindi in his poems. In an interview with The Rumpus, he said:

"When I was an MFA student, a classmate suggested I remove all Hindi words, place names, and familial relationships because he (a cis white man) could not understand the poem. Sunu Chandy, another classmate, spoke up and said, 'These are real people and real places. People actually talk like this.' When it comes to the inclusion of Bhojpuri or Hindi in my poems, I cannot help but read racism and xenophobia into it. I do not think that by making my work more palatable for American audiences by erasing all South Asian and Caribbean references, or somehow defining them in the poem, will make my poem better. I think removing specific words and phrases flattens poetry. The world is a big place with so many different kinds of experiences—and so is the United States. This complexity is already a part of the American literary landscape. What I mean here is that I do not want to sanitize my experience, or act as a cultural informant who is completely decontextualized from the first home space."

== Translation ==
He was the translator of the only first-hand account of the mass displacement of people from the Anglophone Caribbean: I Even Regret Night: Holi Songs of Demerara, which was released from Kaya Press. It was originally published in 1916 by an indentured laborer and excavated by Guyanese-American writer Gaiutra Bahadur during her research for Coolie Woman: The Odyssey of Indenture. Her afterword to I Even Regret Night provides a picture of the author of the songbook, Lal Bihari Sharma, and insight into the process of recovering a rare and lost document of a marginalized history. For his work on this book, Mohabir was awarded a 2015 PEN/Heim Translation Fund Grant and the 2020 Academy of American Poets' Harold Morton Landon Translation Award and was a recipient of the Hindi Language Fellowships from the American Institute of Indian Studies.

Of his translation work, he says in an interview with The Rumpus:

"Hawai‘i is the place where I completed my translation of Holi Songs of Demerara by Lalbihari Sharma. Gaiutra Bahadur writes about this text in her book Coolie Woman: The Odyssey of Indenture, When she asked if I would like to translate the full document, I very enthusiastically agreed. The collection, originally written in 1916, will be released in 2018 from Kaya Press. Since Hawai‘i is an illegally occupied nation that has a history of plantation exploitation and settler colonialism, translating this text in particular showed me how my own experiences of colonization resonate with this archipelago in the Pacific."

== Personal life ==
In 2021, Mohabir released his memoir Antiman, in which he addresses his life as a gay man.
