= The Ugly Game =

- Author: Heidi Blake and Jonathan Calvert
- Publisher: Scribner
- Publication date: August 2015
- Pages: 480
- ISBN: 978-1-5011-3149-3

The Ugly Game: The Corruption of FIFA and the Qatari Plot to Buy the World Cup is a book written by British investigative journalists Heidi Blake and Jonathan Calvert. The book was published by Scribner in August 2015.
