= James Fergusson =

James Fergusson may refer to:

== Politics ==
- Sir James Fergusson, 6th Baronet (1832–1907), Governor of South Australia, New Zealand and Bombay
- Sir James Fergusson, 8th Baronet (1904–1973), Lord Lieutenant of Ayrshire
- Sir James Fergusson, Lord Kilkerran (1688–1759), Scottish politician and judge

== Military ==
- Sir James Fergusson (British Army officer) (1787–1865), Governor of Gibraltar, 1855–1859
- Sir James Fergusson (Royal Navy officer) (1871–1942), British admiral

== Others ==
- Sir James Fergusson, 4th Baronet (1765–1838), see Dalrymple baronets
- James Fergusson (architect) (1808–1886), Scottish architect and writer
- James Fergusson (author), (1966-) British journalist and author
- James Fergusson (judge) (1769–1842), Scottish judge and legal writer

== See also ==
- James Ferguson (disambiguation)
- Fergusson (disambiguation)
