= Why the Germans Do It Better =

2020 book by John Kampfner

Why the Germans Do It Better: Notes from a Grown-Up Country
- First edition
- Author: John Kampfner
- Publisher: Atlantic Books
- Publication date: 27 August 2020
- Pages: 320
- ISBN: 978-1-78649-978-3

Why the Germans Do It Better: Notes from a Grown-Up Country is a 2020 book by British journalist John Kampfner.

Publication rights in the Commonwealth of Nations, excluding Canada, were acquired by Atlantic Books in March 2019.

== Summary ==
“Why the Germans Do It Better: Notes from a Grown-Up Country” by John Kampfner examines the factors behind Germany's impressive political, economic, and cultural achievements, contrasting them with the difficulties faced by the UK and other Western countries. Kampfner credits Germany's success to its strong commitment to democracy, a well-balanced social market economy, and a comprehensive welfare state. He highlights Germany's effective response to crises, such as the refugee situation and the COVID-19 pandemic, showcasing the country's efficient governance and societal resilience. By combining historical context with contemporary analysis, Kampfner presents Germany as a model of stability and maturity in a world that is often volatile.

== Reception ==
=== Critical reception ===
Ben Hall for the Financial Times praised the work as "well-timed and well-aimed" in light of Germany's handling of the COVID-19 pandemic. David Edgerton in The Guardian suggested that the book was not just a study of Germany, but also a comparison between the United Kingdom after Brexit, and Germany. Similarly, Ruadhán Mac Cormaic for The Irish Times described the work as a "lament on the state of contemporary, growth-stunted Britain". Matthew Qvortrup described the book in Prospect as a "well-argued case" to learn from Germany. Oliver Moody of The Times described the book as an "impeccably fair guide" to Germany. Anne McElvoy for The Observer said the book was an "even-handed hymn to Germany" that "underlines why Britain will need its help in a post-Brexit world". Simon Heffer in The Daily Telegraph awarded the book two out of five stars.

=== Awards ===
The book was long-listed for the 2021 Orwell Prize.
