= Anton La Guardia =

Anton La Guardia is an Italian journalist.

== Career ==
He is the diplomatic editor of The Economist. He is the former diplomatic editor of The Daily Telegraph.

== Honors and awards ==
In 2008, La Guardia was nominated for the Orwell Prize for six columns he wrote.

In 2017, La Guardia, Zanny Minton Beddoes, Henry Tricks, Chris Lockwood and Edward McBride were nominated for the Gerald Loeb Award for Breaking News for their article in The Economist titled Saudi Aramco: The World’s Most Valuable IPO.

== Books ==
- Holy Land, Unholy War: Israelis and Palestinians (John Murray, 2001)
- War Without End: Israelis, Palestinians, and the Struggle for a Promised Land (St. Martin's Griffin, 2002)
- with John Peet, Unhappy Union: How the Euro Crisis -- and Europe -- Can Be Fixed (PublicAffairs, 2014)
