= Richard Weight =

British writer

Richard Weight is a British writer.

His book Patriots was shortlisted for the 2003 Orwell Prize for political writing.

== Books ==
- Porridge: BFI Classics (2020, Bloomsbury Publishing)
- Mod! A Very British Style (2013)
- Patriots: National Identity in Britain 1940-2000 (2002)
