= Alpa Shah =

British anthropologist (born 1976)

- Born: 1976 (age 49–50)
- Education: Newnham College, Cambridge (BA Honours in Geography)
- Occupation: Anthropologist

Alpa Shah (born 1976) is a British social anthropologist and writer specialising in South Asia. She is Professor of Social Anthropology at the University of Oxford, and author of the award-winning Nightmarch: Among India’s Revolutionary Guerrillas, a finalist for the 2019 Orwell Prize for Political Writing. Shah has written for newspapers and magazines in the UK, US and India, including the New Statesman, Foreign Policy, New York Review of Books, The Times of India and Hindustan Times. Shah has also made a radio documentary on ‘India’s Red Belt’ for BBC Radio 4 Crossing Continents, reported for BBC Radio 4's From Our Own Correspondent, and co-curated a major photographic exhibition 'Behind the Indian Boom'.

== Education, teaching and research ==
Shah was raised in Nairobi, Kenya in an extended Gujarati Indian family until she moved with her grandmother, parents and sisters to England at the age of 15. She graduated with a first-class BA Honours in Geography from Newnham College, University of Cambridge in 1997, and then moved to the London School of Economics to undertake an MSc and PhD in social anthropology. Completing her doctorate in 2004, Shah immediately went on to teach at Goldsmiths, University of London as Lecturer in Anthropology.

In 2013, Shah returned as Reader to her alma mater, the Department of Anthropology, London School of Economics where she was promoted to full Professor in 2021. At London School of Economics, Shah was closely involved in the establishment of the International Inequalities Institute where she convenes a research theme on the Global Economies of Care. Shah was a close friend and colleague of the anthropologist David Graeber until his untimely death in 2020. In 2024, Oxford University appointed Shah as Professor of Social Anthropology with a Fellowship at All Souls College and she became the eighth person to hold the post, the first woman and the first person of the global majority.

Shah has conducted long-term anthropological fieldwork in eastern India where she lived amongst its indigenous peoples, also called Adivasis, for four and a half years. There, in the hilly forests of the Adivasis, Shah conducted research among the Naxalite-Maoist guerrillas that she went on to research and write about.

Shah is the author of three books and numerous academic articles on topics including indigenous rights and environmentalism; citizenship and revolution; inequality and poverty; seasonal migration and agrarian change; education and affirmative action; development and corruption; leadership and democracy. She has been the recipient of several major grants from the UK Economic and Social Research Council, the British Academy, the European Union European Research Council and the Wenner Gren Foundation.

== Honours ==
Shah’s book, Nightmarch: Among India’s Revolutionary Guerrillas was a finalist for the 2019 Orwell Prize for Political Writing, a finalist for the 2019 New India Book Foundation Prize, longlisted for the 2019 Tata Literature Live Non-Fiction Award and winner of the 2020 Association for Political and Legal Anthropology Book Prize in Critical Anthropology. Nightmarch was also a 2018 Book of the Year for the New Statesman, History Workshop, Scroll India and a The Hindu Year in Review book.

Shah has delivered several prestigious lectures including the 2012 Malinowski Memorial Lecture (awarded to outstanding anthropologists at an early stage of their career), the 2019 Willem Wertheim Lecture at the University of Amsterdam, the 2019 Annual Gold Lecture in Anthropology and the inaugural David Graeber Memorial Lecture in 2021. Shah has been a Writer in Residence at the University of Otago, New Zealand and Visiting Fellow at Jawaharlal Nehru University, Delhi; Delhi University and Tribhuvan University, Kathmandu, Nepal.

In 2024 her book The Incarcerations was shortlisted for the Orwell Prize for Political Writing.

== Books ==
2024 The Incarcerations: BK-16 and the Search for Democracy in India. New York: HarperCollins.

2018 Nightmarch: Among India's Revolutionary Guerrillas. London: Hurst; Chicago: University of Chicago Press; New Delhi: HarperCollins. (Translated into German, Italian, French, Hindi and Bengali).

2017 Ground Down by Growth: Tribe, Caste, Class and Inequality in 21st Century India. (co-authored with Jens Lerche, Richard Axelby, Dalel Benbabaali, Brendan Donegan, Jayaseelan Raj and Vikramaditya Thakur). London: Pluto Press; Delhi: Oxford University Press (Translated into Hindi).

2010 In the Shadows of the State: Indigenous Politics, Environmentalism and Insurgency in Jharkhand, India. Durham (N.C.) and London: Duke University Press. Delhi: Oxford University Press.
