= James Fergusson (author) =

British journalist and author

James Fergusson (born 1966) is a British journalist and author specialising in Muslim affairs.

== Early life ==
Fergusson was born in London, the son of the Scottish journalist, author and MEP, Adam Fergusson, and Penelope Hughes (d.2009). He was educated at Eton College and Brasenose College, Oxford.

== Career ==
Fergusson started at The Independent before joining Robert Maxwell’s ill-fated weekly, The European, where he became Op-Ed Features Editor. His interest in Islamic affairs developed when he turned freelance in the mid-1990s, and began reporting from Algeria, Bosnia and Taliban-controlled Afghanistan. In 1998 he moved to Sarajevo as press spokesman for the Office of the High Representative, the UN-mandated body charged with implementing the 1995 Dayton Peace Accord. This was followed by a stint in London as an executive at Hakluyt & Company, the secretive corporate intelligence agency. He returned to full-time writing in 2004 with the publication of his first book, Kandahar Cockney.

== Books ==
Kandahar Cockney (HarperCollins 2004) tells the story of Mir, an Afghan asylum-seeker in London who had worked for Fergusson as a translator on assignment in northern Afghanistan. It was a Radio 4 Book of the Week. This was followed by The Vitamin Murders (Portobello 2007), an account of the 1952 murder of the nutritionist Sir Jack Drummond.

A Million Bullets (Transworld 2008) a critique of Britain's military engagement in Afghanistan, was the British Army's Military Book of the Year. It was followed by Taliban – Unknown Enemy (2010), a plea for greater understanding and engagement with Nato's Afghan enemy. The World's Most Dangerous Place (2013) examines the security threat posed to the West by the failed state of Somalia and its diaspora. It was shortlisted for the Orwell Prize.

Al-Britannia, My Country (2017) recounts his year spent among Britain's Muslims, and argues for a new approach to that fast-expanding community. His latest book, In Search of the River Jordan investigates the politics of water supply in Israel-Palestine.

== Personal life ==
Fergusson married Melissa Rose Norman (1970-2021) in 2004. He lives in Edinburgh with his four children.
