= Diana Evans =

British novelist, journalist and critic (born 1972)

Diana Evans FRSL
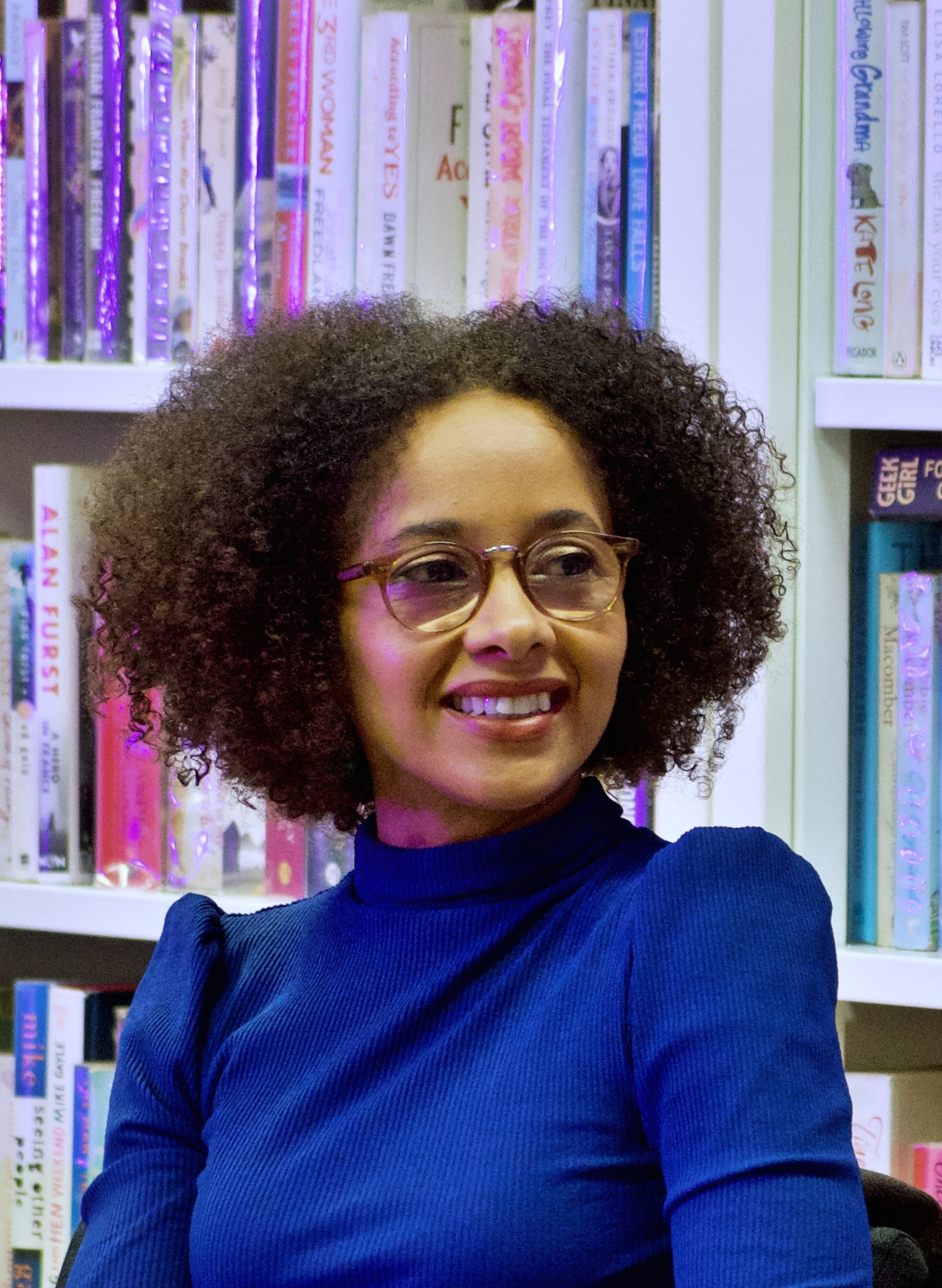
- Born: 1972 (age 53–54); Neasden, London, England
- Education: University of Sussex; University of East Anglia
- Occupation: Novelist
- Relatives: Mary Evans (sister)
- Writing career
- Period: 2005–present
- Notable works: 26a (2005); The Wonder (2009); Ordinary People (2018)
- Notable awards: South Bank Sky Arts Award; 2019 deciBel Writer of the Year award 2006; Orange Award for New Writers; 2005; Betty Trask Award; 2005
- Website: www.diana-evans.com

Diana Omo Evans FRSL (born 1972) is a British novelist, journalist and critic. Evans has written four full-length novels. Her debut novel 26a (2005) won the Orange Award for New Writers, the Betty Trask Award and the deciBel Writer of the Year award. Her third novel Ordinary People (2018) was shortlisted for the Women's Prize for Fiction and won the South Bank Sky Arts Award for Literature. Her other novels include A House for Alice (2023).

As well as writing fiction, Evans contributes essays and literary criticism to the national press. She was honoured as a fellow of the Royal Society of Literature in 2020.

== Background and education ==
Evans is the daughter of a Nigerian mother and an English father. She was born and grew up in Neasden, north-west London, with her parents and five sisters, one of whom was her twin. She also spent part of her childhood in Lagos, Nigeria.

She completed a media studies degree at the University of Sussex. While in Brighton, she was a dancer in the African dance troupe Mashango.

She completed an MA in creative writing at the University of East Anglia. At the age of 25, she became a journalist. She contributed human-interest features and art criticism to a range of magazines, journals and newspapers in the UK; published interviews with celebrities; worked as an editor for Pride Magazine and the literary journal Calabash.

== Writing ==
Her first novel, 26a, "a Bildungsroman that centres its storyline on the growing process of a pair of identical twins of Nigerian-British origin, Georgia and Bessi" growing up in Neasden, was published in 2005 to wide critical acclaim and has since been translated into 12 languages. It was shortlisted in the first novel category for both the Whitbread Book Award and the Commonwealth Writers' Prize, and was the inaugural winner of the Orange Award for New Writers. Literary critic Maya Jaggi said in The Guardian of 26a: "The writing is both mature and freshly perceptive, creating not only a warmly funny novel of a Neasden childhood ... but a haunting account of the loss of innocence and mental disintegration." Carol Birch, writing in The Independent, said of 26a that "Evans writes with tremendous verve and dash. Her ear for dialogue is superb, and she has wit and sharp perception" and though she has her criticisms, concludes that Evans "has produced a consistently readable book filled with likeable characters: a study of loss that has great heart and humour." According to Diriye Osman in the Huffington Post: "Here was a Bildungsroman of such daring and sustained elegance that it felt like a gorgeous dance of a novel. In many ways, it is apropos that this book which focused on the secret bond that exists between twins was followed in 2009 by the equally masterful The Wonder, a novel rooted in the world of dance."

Evans' second novel, The Wonder (2009), explores the world of dancing in the context of Caribbean immigration to the UK, London gentrification, and the bond between father and son. Maggie Gee, writing in The Independent, called it "a serious work of art, with sentences like ribbons of silk winding around a skeleton of haunting imagery. ... The Wonder's most central achievement is to explore what art means in human life. ... This second novel, both powerful and delicate, lacking in linear plot but rich in the poetry of human observation, proves that Evans has what she calls 'the watch-me, the grace note' that marks a true artist."

Her third novel, Ordinary People (2018), is a portrait of family life for two black couples in their 30s in South London in a year bookended by the election of Barack Obama and the death of Michael Jackson. Ordinary People was the winner of the South Bank Sky Arts Award and shortlisted for the Women's Prize for Fiction, the Orwell Prize for Political Fiction and the Rathbones Folio Prize.

Her fourth novel, A House for Alice, was published in 2023, characterised as "the first memorialisation of Grenfell in fiction", it received Evans's second shortlisting for the Orwell Prize for Political Fiction. Harper's Bazaar described the novel as 'a state-of-the-nation masterpiece'.

Also a journalist, Evans has contributed essays and literary criticism to Marie Claire, The Independent, The Observer, The Guardian, The Daily Telegraph, the Financial Times, Time, The New York Review of Books and Harper's Bazaar.

She is an associate lecturer of Creative Writing at Goldsmiths, University of London. She is a patron of the SI Leeds Literary Prize for unpublished fiction by Black and Asian women in the UK. She is also a 2014–16 Royal Literary Fund Fellow at the London College of Fashion and a 2016–17 Royal Literary Fund Fellow at the University of Kent.

== Publications ==
=== Novels ===
- 26a. London: Chatto & Windus. 2005. ISBN 978-0-7011-7888-8.
- The Wonder. London: Chatto & Windus. 2009. ISBN 978-0-7011-7797-3.
- Ordinary People. London: Chatto & Windus. 2018. ISBN 978-1784742157.
- A House for Alice. London: Chatto & Windus, 2023. ISBN 978-1784744267.

=== Short stories ===
- "Journey Home", in Newland, Courttia; Kadija George, eds. (2000). IC3: The Penguin Book of New Black Writing in Britain. London: Hamish Hamilton. ISBN 978-0-241-14074-1.
- "The Beginning", in McCarthy, Karen, ed. (2003). Kin: new fiction by black and Asian women. London: Serpent's Tail. ISBN 978-1-85242-852-5.
- "Another Saturday Night (Sam Cooke, 1963)", in Too Much Too Young: The Book Slam Annual Vol. II. London: Book Slam Productions. 2012. ISBN 978-1-908615-58-9.
- "Thunder", in Busby, Margaret, ed. (2019). New Daughters of Africa: An International Anthology of Writing by Women of African Descent. Oxford: Myriad Editions. ISBN 978-1912408009.
- "The Repeating House", Deep Night, Dark Night, Shakespeare's Globe, 2019
- "Singular", Short Works, BBC Radio 4, 2019

=== Non-fiction ===
- I Want to Talk to You: And Other Conversations. London: Chatto & Windus. 2025. ISBN 9781784744243.

== Awards ==
- 2005: Orange Award for New Writers, for 26a, Winner
- 2005: Betty Trask Award, Society of Authors, for 26a
- 2005: Guardian First Book Award, for 26a, Longlist
- 2005: First Novel category, Whitbread Book Awards, for 26a, Shortlist
- 2006: Commonwealth Writers' Prize, Best First Book category, for 26a, Shortlist
- 2006: deciBel Writer of the Year award, British Book Awards, for 26a, Winner
- 2006: Times/South Bank Show Breakthrough Award, for 26a, Shortlist
- 2007: Arts Foundation Fellowship, for 26a, Shortlist
- 2007: International Dublin Literary Award, for 26a, Longlist
- 2013: Arts Council England Grant for the Arts Award
- 2017: Arts Council England Grant for the Arts Award
- 2018: Andrew Carnegie Medal for Excellence in Fiction, for Ordinary People, Longlist
- 2019: Precious Lifestyle Award, for Ordinary People, Shortlist
- 2019: South Bank Sky Arts Award, for Ordinary People, Winner
- 2019: Women's Prize for Fiction, for Ordinary People, Shortlist
- 2019: Rathbones Folio Prize, for Ordinary People, Shortlist
- 2019: Orwell Prize for Political Fiction, for Ordinary People, Shortlist
- 2019: Glass Bell Award, for Ordinary People, Longlist
- 2019: Prix Femina, for Ordinary People, Shortlist
- 2019: Grand prix des lectrices de Elle, for Ordinary People, Shortlist
- 2020: Elected a fellow of the Royal Society of Literature
- 2023: Orwell Prize for Political Fiction, for A House for Alice, Shortlist
- 2026: Jhalak Prose Prize, for I Want To Talk To You: And Other Conversations, Winner
