= London Review of Books =

British journal of literary reviews

- Editor: Jean McNicol, Alice Spawls
- Categories: Literature, history, ideas
- Frequency: 24 per year
- Circulation: 73,378 (ABC: 2024)
- Publisher: Reneé Doegar
- Founded: 1979; 47 years ago
- Country: United Kingdom
- Based in: Bloomsbury, London
- Language: English
- Website: www.lrb.co.uk
- ISSN: 0260-9592

The London Review of Books (LRB) is a British literary magazine published semimonthly that features articles and essays on fiction and non-fiction subjects, which are usually structured as book reviews.

== History ==
The London Review of Books (LRB) was founded in 1979, when publication of The Times Literary Supplement was suspended during the year-long lock-out at The Times. The LRB's founding editors were Karl Miller, then professor of English at University College London; Mary-Kay Wilmers, formerly an editor at The Times Literary Supplement; and Susannah Clapp, a former editor at Jonathan Cape. For its first six months, the LRB appeared as an insert in The New York Review of Books. It became an independent publication in May 1980. Its political stance has been described by Alan Bennett, a prominent contributor, as "consistently radical".

Unlike The Times Literary Supplement (TLS), the majority of the articles the LRB publishes (usually fifteen per issue) are long essays. Some articles in each issue are not based on books, while several short articles discuss film or exhibitions. Political and social essays are frequent. The magazine is headquartered in Bloomsbury, London.

Wilmers took over as editor in 1992 and remained as editor for almost 30 years. She was succeeded by Jean McNicol and Alice Spawls in 2021. Average circulation per issue for January to December 2023 was 74,743.

In January 2010, The Times wrote that the London Review was £27M in debt to the Wilmers' family trust, although the trust had "no intention of the lender seeking repayment of the loan in the near future".

The London Review Bookshop opened in Bloomsbury in May 2003, and the Cake Shop next door in November 2007 (closed September 2024). The bookshop is used as a venue for author presentations and discussions.

In 2011, when Pankaj Mishra criticised Niall Ferguson's book Civilisation: The West and the Rest in the LRB, Ferguson threatened to sue for libel.

In 2023, the Hebrew Writers Association in Israel openly published a protest response to the letter of support for Gaza that was published in the journal, and called writers and artists around the world to support the freeing of the kidnapped.

In January 2024, A Hitch in Time: Reflections Ready for Reconsideration, an anthology of Christopher Hitchens's writings between 1983 and 2002 for The London Review of Books, was published.

== Contributors ==
Contributors have included:

- Tariq Ali
- Martin Amis
- Benedict Anderson
- Perry Anderson
- Neal Ascherson
- John Ashbery
- Andrew Bacevich
- Julian Barnes
- Mary Beard
- Alan Bennett
- Tony Blair
- Anita Brookner
- Gordon Brown
- Anne Carson
- Angela Carter
- Terry Castle
- Stanley Cavell
- Bruce Chatwin
- T. J. Clark
- Tom Clark
- Patrick Cockburn
- Stefan Collini
- Jenny Diski
- Terry Eagleton
- William Empson
- Paul Farmer
- Penelope Fitzgerald
- Jerry Fodor
- Paul Foot
- Dawn Foster
- Dani Garavelli
- Martha Gellhorn
- Stephen Greenblatt
- Mark Greif
- Nigel Hamilton
- Jeremy Harding
- Tony Harrison
- Seymour Hersh
- Rosemary Hill
- David Hirson
- Christopher Hitchens
- Eric Hobsbawm
- Michael Ignatieff
- Kazuo Ishiguro
- Tony Judt
- Fredric Jameson
- Frank Kermode
- Colin Kidd
- India Knight
- Kevin Kopelson
- John Lanchester
- Ben Lerner
- Patricia Lockwood
- Tom Lowenstein
- Colin MacCabe
- Alasdair MacIntyre
- Donald MacKenzie
- Hilary Mantel
- Adam Mars-Jones
- Wyatt Mason
- Ian McEwan
- Colin McGinn
- James Meek
- Paul Mendez
- Hugh Miles
- Ed Miliband
- Pankaj Mishra
- Blake Morrison
- Tom Nairn
- Glen Newey
- Martha Nussbaum
- Andrew O'Hagan
- Tom Paulin
- Nicholas Penny
- Adam Phillips
- Hilary Putnam
- Christopher Ricks
- Richard Rorty
- Jacqueline Rose
- David Runciman
- Salman Rushdie
- Lorna Sage
- Edward Said
- Raphael Samuel
- Stephen Sedley
- Tom Shippey
- Elaine Showalter
- Iain Sinclair
- Quentin Skinner
- Susan Sontag
- Amia Srinivasan
- Galen Strawson
- Ernest Sackville Turner
- Colm Tóibín
- Marina Warner
- Bernard Williams
- James Wood
- Slavoj Žižek

== See also ==
- Literary criticism
