= The Elements of Power =

2026 non-fiction book by Nicolas Niarchos

- Author: Nicolas Niarchos
- Publisher: Penguin Press
- Publication date: January 20, 2026
- Pages: 480
- ISBN: 978-0-593-49201-7

The Elements of Power: A Story of War, Technology, and the Dirtiest Supply Chain on Earth is a 2026 non-fiction book by journalist Nicolas Niarchos.

The book explores the supply chains for the lithium-ion batteries of electric cars. It covers the impact these supply chains have on both human rights and the environment.

== Publication history ==
Nicolas Niarchos is a journalist for The New Yorker. In 2024, an investigation of his into mining in Indonesia was nominated for the Livingston Award. He is the son of Greek shipping magnate Spyros Niarchos and English socialite Daphne Guinness. The Elements of Power is his debut book.

While visiting the Democratic Republic of the Congo to do research for the book, Niarchos and his Congolese fixer were detained by the Congolese authorities for five days in Lubumbashi. He was subsequently banned from re-entering the country. A launch party for the book was held in New York City in January 2026, hosted by British magazine The Spectator.

== Critical reception ==
James McConnachie of The Times described the book as "a serious exposé," praising "the detail and quality of the reportage." Kirkus Reviews reviewed the book as "an eye-opening and sobering investigation that challenges us to consider the suffering embedded in our everyday devices."

David Pilling of The Financial Times gave the book a generally positive review, saying that it "shifts dizzyingly from reportage to a thematic sifting through its main ideas. At its best, it’s an exciting approach. At its worst, it can blur into a jumble of incidents from different locations that can be hard to locate in the arc of the overall narrative... Still, there are merits in a structure that demonstrates just how mind-blowingly interconnected (yet disconnected) the world can be."

Peter S. Goodman of The New York Times gave the book a negative review, saying that "this trove of material is served up with scant attention to narrative. The result is a book that is frequently a bewildering slog."
