= Lucy Ash =

British broadcaster, journalist and author

Lucy Ash is a British documentary-maker, journalist, broadcaster and author. Her work mainly appears on BBC platforms.

Much of her work has focused on former Soviet countries. She has also focused on prisons considerably in her work.

== Background ==
Ash attended Camden School for Girls in North London. Between the ages of 12 and 16, Ash spent part of every summer staying with a French family. She attended the University of Oxford from 1980 to 1983, where she studied English Language and Literature at New College.

== Broadcasting career ==
Ash's work in radio started in Russia, where she worked as producer in the BBC's bureau in Moscow from 1990. In 1994, she moved back to London, where she reported considerably from former Soviet states for the programme Eurofile on BBC Radio 4. In 2002, Ash received an Amnesty International UK Media Award for an edition of Crossing Continents on BBC Radio 4 which focussed on Israel/Palestine, and in 2004 she was again given the award for another edition of Crossing Continents.

In 2011 and 2012, Ash presented a series of ten programmes on BBC Radio 4 which looked at how young people in Europe were dealing with the political and economic crises affecting them.

As of 2010 and 2013, Ash was a presenter of Outlook on the BBC World Service. Also in 2010, Ash presented an edition of This World on BBC Two which focused on the stealing of brides in Chechnya. Also in 2013, Ash began being a trustee for Jerwood Arts, an organisation funding early-career artists. In 2014, Ash presented an edition of Our World on BBC World News and BBC News, examining Crimea following the Russian annexation of the territory. In the mid-2010s, Ash presented editions of Crossing Continents on BBC Radio 4. She reported for From Our Own Correspondent throughout the 2010s.

Ash continues to present editions of Crossing Continents and Assignment on the BBC World Service. She also continues to produce reports for the BBC News website. She reports regularly for From Our Own Correspondent. She occasionally writes for non-BBC outlets including The New World, The Moscow Times and Prospect.

From March 2023 until May 2025, Ash held a fellowship at Institut für die Wissenschaften vom Menschen (Institute for Human Sciences), during which she examined the Russian Orthodox Church under President Vladimir Putin. She is a member of the Committee of Supporters for the RAW in WAR Anna Politkovskaya Award.

== Writing career ==
On 3 October 2024, Ash's book The Baton and the Cross: Russia's Church from Pagans to Putin was published. The book examines the history of the Russian Orthodox Church. It was a finalist for the 2025 Orwell Prize,and also shortlisted for the 2025 Pushkin House Book Prize and 2025 British Academy Book Prize. The book was also longlisted for the 2025 Ondaatje Prize.

== Personal life ==
Ash married the broadcaster and author John Kampfner in 1992. Ash can speak fluent French and Russian. She resides in London.
