= Boston High School =

Location
- Spilsby Road; Boston, Lincolnshire, PE21 9PF; England
- 52°59′19″N 0°00′38″W

Information
- Type: Academy
- Motto: Non Nobis Solum (Trans: Not for ourselves alone) and Leading Learning Together
- Established: 1914
- Local authority: Lincolnshire
- Department for Education URN: 139140 Tables
- Ofsted: Reports
- Chair of Governors: Martyn Chambers
- Headteacher: Anne Marie Franks
- Gender: Single Sex (Girls)
- Age: 11 to 18
- Enrolment: 684 pupils
- Houses: Allan; Conway; Ingelow; Kitwood; Lindis
- Colours: Navy blue and Emerald Green
- Website: http://www.bostonhighschool.co.uk

Boston High School, also known as Boston High School for Girls, is a selective grammar school and sixth form college for girls aged 11 to 18 in Boston, Lincolnshire, England. The school's sixth form has been coeducational since 1992.

A 2014 Ofsted report assessed both the school and the sixth form provision as "good", with "outstanding" leadership and management and "outstanding" behaviour and safety. A short inspection carried out in March 2018 found that the school continues to be good.

== Admissions ==
Pupils joining in Year 7 are required, as with other selective grammar schools, to complete an 11+ verbal reasoning and non-verbal reasoning test. This test is carried out at the primary school, administered by the local grammar schools. The current PAN (published admission number) is 108.

Mid-year admissions applications are made through Lincolnshire County Council, who then ask the school to conduct an entry test - in the form of a Cognitive Abilities Test.

Year 11 pupils from any school can apply to join the co-educational Sixth Form as long as the general entry criteria (5 A*-C GCSE grades or equivalent including English and Maths) and subject criteria (varies by subject) are met.

=== Academy status ===
On 1 January 2013, Boston High School became a converter academy, under the leadership of the then headteacher, Dr Jason Howard. No changes were made to the school uniform and the school retained its existing name. This ended the federation between Boston High School and Boston Grammar School, with both schools now having an independent governing body, budget and establishment number.

== History ==
Boston High School first opened on 19 January 1921 at Allan House on Carlton Road, Boston. There was a headmistress and seven teachers, with 112 girls on the roll. Due to increasing pupil numbers additional classrooms were built in 1922. The school's first headmistress was Miss F.M. Knipe, who served from 1914 until 1927, and there have been a further eight headteachers in the history of the school.

=== Move of school site ===
The school was moved to the current Spilsby Road Location on the northern rim of Boston during the autumn of 1938. The foundation stone was laid on 18 November 1937. However, the official opening ceremony did not take place until 1939, the year that the Second World War started. It was officially opened on Tuesday 9 May 1939, the start of the summer term; The school was declared open by Alderman Kitwood, who later would have a house named after him.

Th first speech night with Pernel Strachey, Principal of Newnham College, Cambridge, was in April 1940. In November 1941, the prizes were handed out by Edward Everard Earle Welby-Everard, the father of Major General Sir Christopher Welby-Everard.

During the war girls from Hull were enrolled into the school, having been evacuated from their own city in anticipation of strategic bombing raids by the Luftwaffe.

In 1956 the Mayoress of Boston was 17-year-old Janet Rowe. She had been invited to a Queen's garden party in London on 12 July of that year, but was unable to attend as she was sitting a GCE exam on the same day.

The swimming pool opened in July 1965.

With the British Institute of Management IT competition in 1982, the school entered a team, on the day that BT launched its Confravision service on Thursday 9 September 1982, enabling the team to compete against a team from Assumption Grammar School, a Catholic girls' school in Ballynahinch, County Down.

County schools hockey championships were held at the school in the 1980s.

The school entered a team for Radio 4's former Top of the Form, in the first round (heat 2) against Skegness Grammar School on Wednesday 14 September 1983 at 6.30pm, with their second round against Colchester County High School for Girls being broadcast on 16 & 18 November 1983. The Colchester school would get to the final.

In the 1990s it also referred to itself as the High School, Boston, and had around 850 girls.

A sports hall was being built in 1991. The £1.4 million sports hall was officially opened on the afternoon of Friday 31 January 1992 by Education Secretary Ken Clarke, after he had visited Boston College in the morning.

A French block, with five classrooms, and the sixth form block, was opened on Friday 1 October 1993 by athlete John Disley. It was built by Langwith Builders of Holbeach, and partly funded by the Medlock Charitable Trust and the Bycroft Trust.

=== Federation plans ===
In 2006, there were controversial plans by Lincolnshire County Council to federate Boston High School with the local boys grammar school Boston Grammar School, with effect from September 2011. In 2010 it was announced that due to the withdrawal of Building Schools for the Future funding by the new coalition government, that both schools would operate as two separate schools, still under a federation - on two sites - with one governing body. This arrangement ended when Boston High School became an academy in 2013.

=== Houses ===
The houses are named after people who have played a part in the school's history. The five houses and associated colours are: Allan: Yellow, Conway: Red, Ingelow: Blue, Kitwood: Purple, Lindis: Green.

== Headteachers ==
- Miss Mary Ethel Ridley, had to leave, as she became married to Herbert Haycroft Morris, the headmaster of Boston Grammar School
- January 1928, Miss Ethel Strachan Henry, the first headmistress of Spalding High School, she died on 15 August 1959
- late 1940s, Miss Esme Doreen Thomas, Divinity teacher, studied English at the University of Liverpool, taught at Danesfield Manor School at Walton-on-Thames for four years, she retired to Uppingham in Rutland, and died on 8 December 1992 aged 84
- September 1968, Miss (Jessica) Mary Webb, French teacher and former deputy head at Forest Fields Grammar School in Nottingham, she was awarded the MBE in the 1992 Birthday Honours; she left in July 1995 after 27 years, aged 63; she died on 20 August 2023 aged 92
- September 1995, Barry Searles, aged 41, the deputy head from 1991, and a geography teacher, previous deputy head of Chatham House Grammar School in Kent
- 2014, Andrew Fulbrook, former head from 2007 of William Lovell Church of England Academy in Stickney, Lincolnshire, former head of Technology from 1997 at the Thomas Cowley High School in Donington, Lincolnshire

== Former teachers ==
- Beryl Clay, from 1975 to 2002, a former deputy headteacher, she persuaded 27-year-old Maths teacher Steve Peters to take up sport and athletics in Holbeach; Boston does not have an athletics club
- Dr Steve Peters (psychiatrist), psychiatrist for the gold medal-winning British Cycling Team (taught Maths from 1978 to 1982)

== Notable former pupils ==
- Dame Jennifer Eady, President since 2022 of the Employment Appeal Tribunal
- Mary Riddell, former assistant editor of The Daily Telegraph, and her sister Sheila Riddell

== See also ==
- Boston Grammar School
