= Wendell Steavenson =

Author and journalist (born 1970)

- Born: 1970 (age 55–56); New York City, U.S.
- Education: University of Cambridge
- Occupations: Author, journalist
- Writing career
- Notable awards: Nieman Fellowship; 2014; Guggenheim Fellowship; 2021

Wendell Steavenson (born 1970) is an American author and journalist. She received a Nieman Fellowship in 2014 and a Guggenheim Fellowship in 2021. In 2016, her book Circling the Square was shortlisted for the Orwell Prize for Books, and in 2023, she was a finalist for the Orwell Prize for Journalism for four articles published in The Economist.

She has written for various new outlets, including The Guardian, Financial Times, Granta, and The New Yorker, among others.

== Early life and education ==
Steavenson was born in New York City in 1970 and was raised in London. She is a graduate of the University of Cambridge.

== Career ==
Steavenson started her career as a correspondent for Time in London. In 1998, she moved to Tbilisi, Georgia, then spent two years writing about her experiences there, publishing Stories I Stole with Grove Press in 2002.

In 2003, Steavenson moved to Iraq and wrote about the Iraq War for Slate. In 2009, she published The Weight of a Mustard Seed which explored the stories of high level Ba’ath Party officials including Kamel Sachet, a general who commanded the army in Kuwait City during the first Gulf War who was executed on the orders of Saddam Hussein in 1998. The title of the book came from a Koranic verse which vowed to deliver justice even to the “weight of a mustard seed.”

In 2015, Steavenson published Circling the Square. The book documents her experience of the events of the 2011 Egyptian revolution to the June 2013 Egyptian protests which were centered around Cairo’s Tahrir Square. The book was shortlisted for the 2016 Orwell Prize for Books.

In 2018, Steavenson published her debut novel, Paris Metro. The protagonist, Kit, is a Western journalist who like Steavenson has covered international crises in the Middle East. The November 2015 Paris attacks form the climax of the novel, with Kit at the scene of the massacre at the Bataclan theatre.

During the Russo-Ukrainian War, Steavenson reported from Ukraine for 1843. She was in the country 48 hours after the first day of the Russian invasion.

In 2023, Steavenson published Margot, a coming-of-age story of a young woman with an interest in science growing up in a post–WWII American upper class environment in the 1950s and 1960s.

== Awards and honors ==
Steavenson received a Nieman Fellowship in 2014. She received a Guggenheim Fellowship in 2021. In 2023, she was shortlisted for the Orwell Prize for Journalism for four articles published with The Economist: "The inside story of Chernobyl during the Russian occupation", "Electric shocks, savage dogs and daily beatings: three weeks in Russia as a Ukrainian prisoner-of-war", "The barista-partisan who targeted the Russians in Kherson", and "East of Mariupol: what happened to the Ukrainians who fled to Russia?"

== Books ==
- Stories I Stole (from Georgia). New York, NY: Grove Press. 2002. ISBN 978-0-8021-1737-3.
- The Weight of a Mustard Seed. Atlantic. 2009. ISBN 9781843543053.
- Circling the Square: Stories from the Egyptian Revolution. HarperCollins. 2015. ISBN 9780062375278.
- Paris Metro: A Novel. W. W. Norton & Company. 2018. ISBN 9780393609790.
- Margot. New York: W.W. Norton & Company. 2023. ISBN 978-1-324-02084-4.
