= Gideon Rachman =

British journalist (born 1963)

- Gideon Rachman
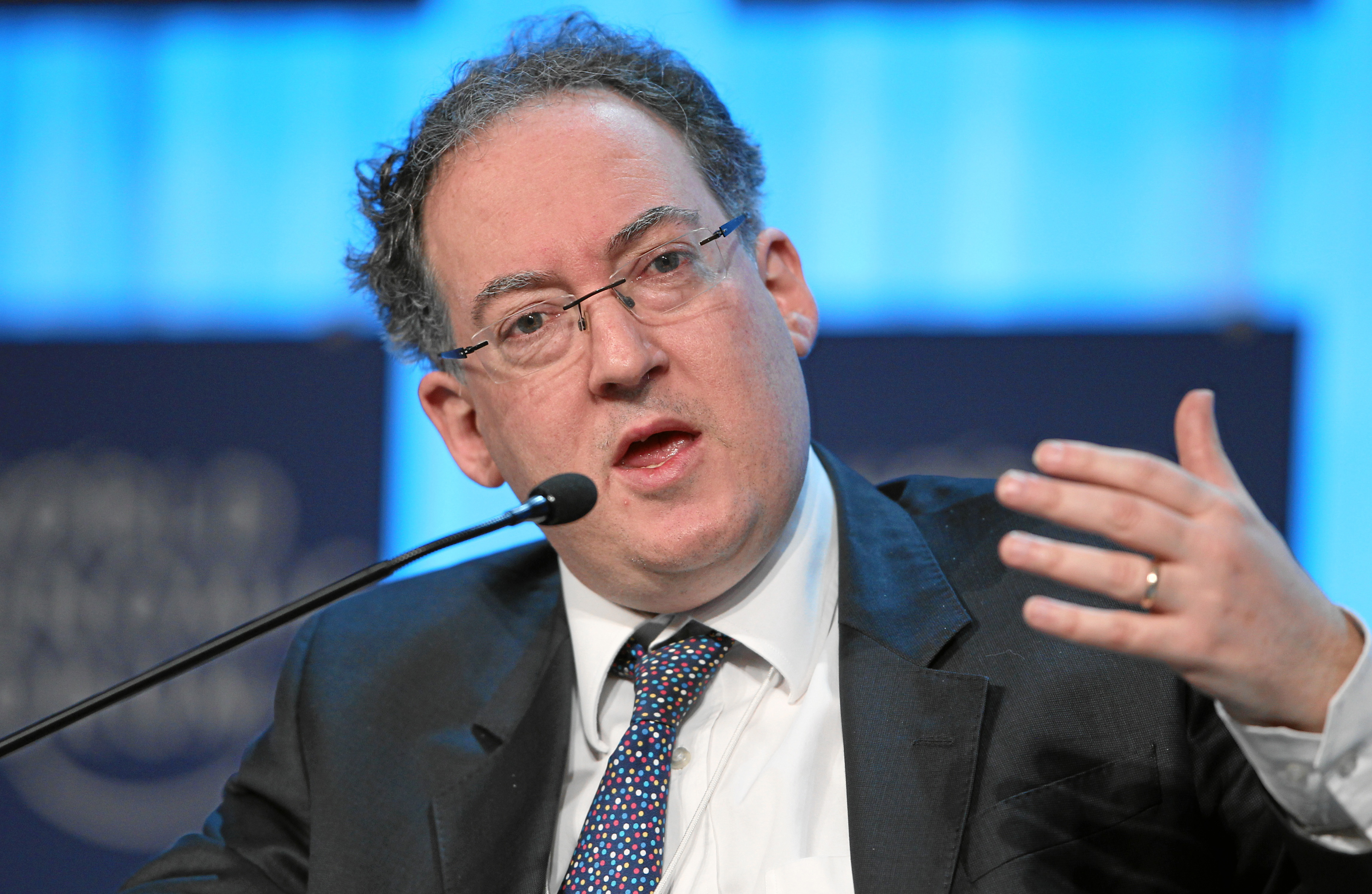
- Rachman at the Annual Meeting 2012 of the World Economic Forum at the congress centre in Davos, Switzerland
- Born: 1963; England
- Education: Gonville and Caius College
- Occupations: Journalist, columnist, opinion writer, foreign correspondent
- Employer: Financial Times (2006–)
- Awards: Orwell Prize (2016); European Press Prize (2016)

Gideon Rachman (born 1963) is a British journalist. He became the chief foreign affairs commentator of the Financial Times in July 2006. In 2016, he won the Orwell Prize for political journalism. In the same year, he was awarded with the Commentator Award at the European Press Prize awards.

== Early life and education ==
Rachman was born in 1963 in England, son of Jewish South Africans, but spent some of his childhood in South Africa. His uncle, Ronnie Hope, was news editor at The Jerusalem Post. From the years 1976 to 1980, he was educated at St Paul's School, a private day school for boys, in Barnes in West London, followed by Gonville and Caius College, at the University of Cambridge, where he gained a first class honours degree, in 1984.

Whilst at Gonville and Caius, he was a friend of future MI6 renegade agent Richard Tomlinson, whom he provided with a reference for his Kennedy Scholarship application.

== Career ==
Rachman began his career with the BBC World Service in 1984. From 1988 to 1990, he was a reporter for The Sunday Correspondent newspaper, based in Washington, D.C.

Rachman spent 15 years at The Economist newspaper; first as its deputy United States editor, then as its Southeast Asia correspondent from a base in Bangkok. He then served as The Economist's Asia editor before taking on the post of Britain editor from 1997 to 2000, following which he was posted in Brussels where he penned the Charlemagne European-affairs column.

At The Financial Times, Rachman writes on international politics, with a particular stress on American foreign policy, the European Union and geopolitics in Asia.

Gideon Rachman maintains a blog on the FT site. His brother is Tom Rachman, the author of the novel The Imperfectionists, and his sister Carla is an art historian. Their sister, Emily, died of breast cancer in 2012.

== Views ==
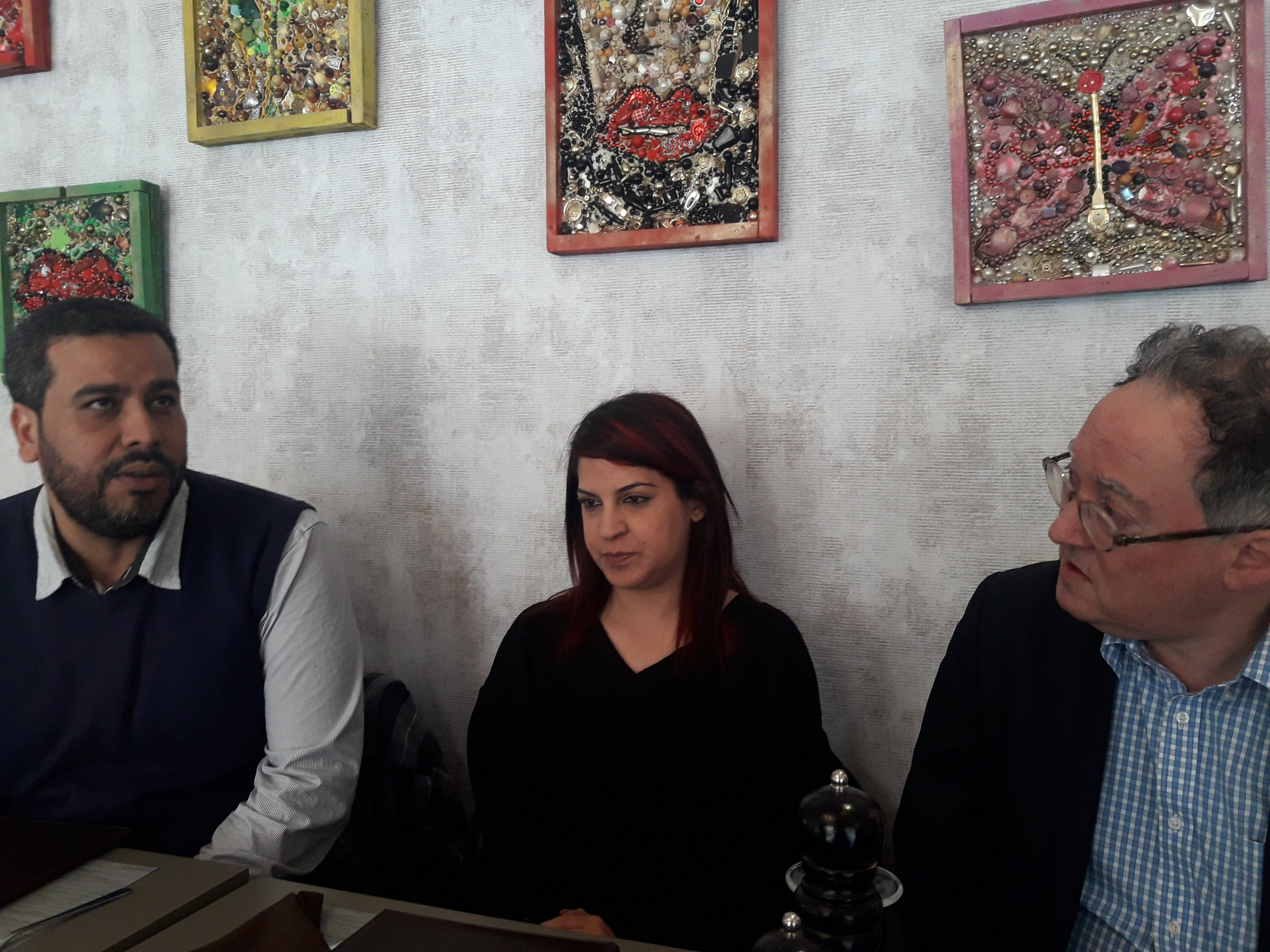
Rachman with Tunisian bloggers Wissem Tlili and Lina Ben Mhenni in 2018

Rachman is noted for advocating a looser, non-federal European Union. In 2002, he staged a debate in Prospect magazine with Nick Clegg, who was then an MEP for the East Midlands. Clegg argued strongly that Britain should join the European single currency. Rachman disagreed, writing, "I believe the political changes involved in joining the Euro carry enormous risks. I do not believe it is 'progressive' or 'self-confident' to take those risks."

More recently, Rachman has argued in the FT that the EU must take a flexible and open approach to the political demands of their member states or face failure. However, during the UK referendum on EU membership, Rachman argued for the UK to vote to stay inside the EU – arguing that the organisation, although flawed, was an important guardian of democratic values and security in Europe. Rachman was also one of the first commentators to predict that the UK would vote to leave the EU.

Rachman has a strong interest in East Asia and the rise of China, and has repeatedly warned that inflexibility on the part of both China and the USA may lead to conflict. He has also often focused on the challenges to US power around the world.

Rachman twice endorsed Barack Obama for the presidency and has defended his foreign policy. He has also been sceptical of the case for intervention in Syria.

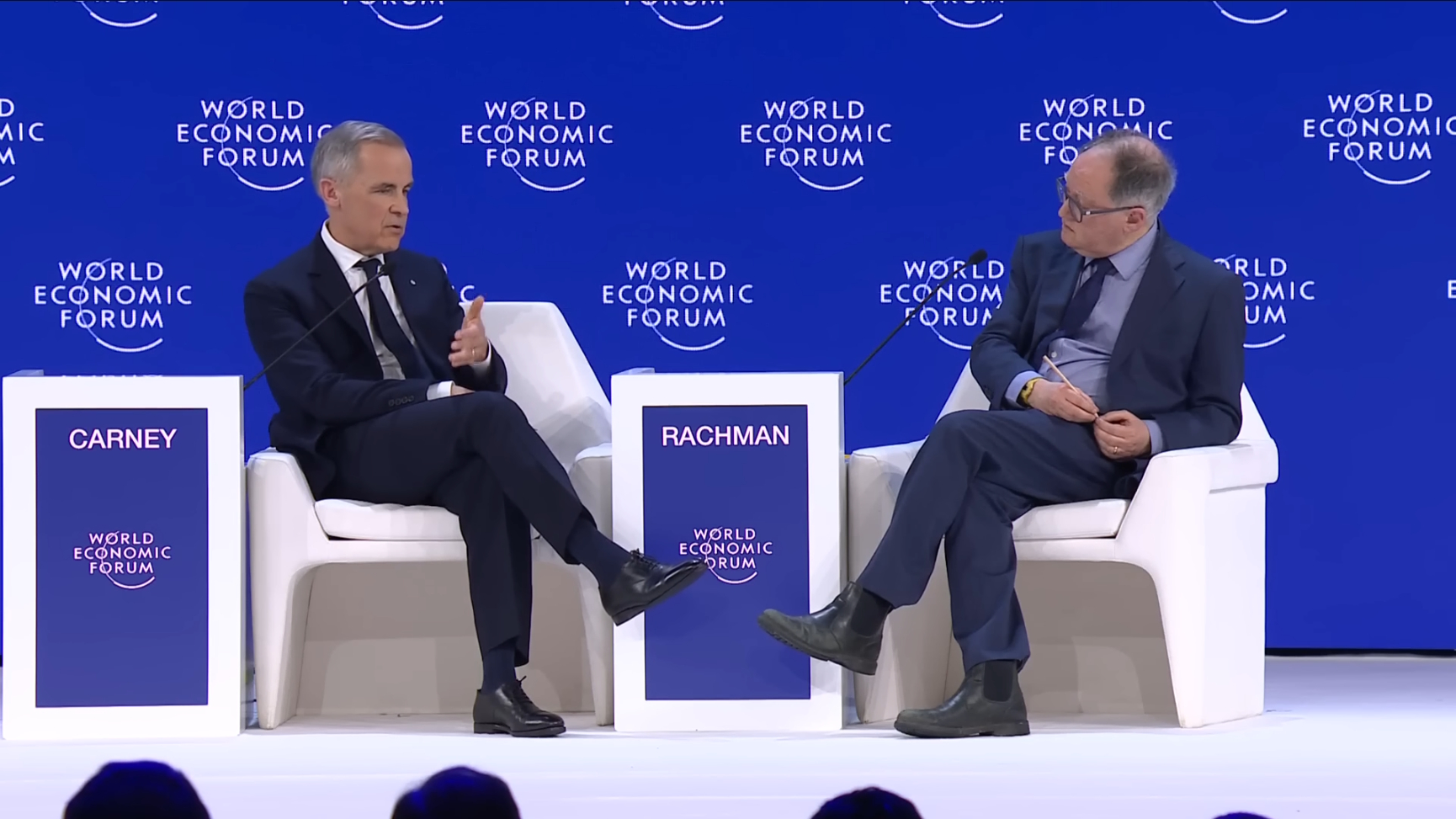
Rachman interviewing Prime Minister Carney at the 2026 World Economic Forum

Rachman pointed out that the Presidency of Donald Trump historic changes in foreign and domestic policies were inherited by the Biden administration, including opposition to free trade and competition with China. While the Biden team has decried Trump's threat to American democracy, they already share many of Trump's basic assumptions about trade, globalization, and rivalry with China.

== Books ==
Rachman's first book, Zero-Sum World: Politics, Power and Prosperity after the Crash was published in 2010 in the United Kingdom. It was published under the title Zero-Sum Future in the United States and translated into seven languages, including Chinese, German and Korean. The book was part history and part prediction. It argued that the thirty years from 1978 to 2008 had been shaped by a shared embrace of globalisation by the world's major powers that had created a "win-win world", leading to greater peace and prosperity. Rachman predicted that the financial and economic crisis that began in 2008 would lead to a zero-sum world, characterised by increasing tensions between the world's major powers. The New York Times newspaper praised the book as "perhaps the best one-volume account now available of the huge post-Communist spread of personal freedom and economic prosperity."

In 2016 his second book, Easternisation: War and Peace in the Asian Century, was published by The Bodley Head. Rachman argued that 500 years of Western domination of global politics is coming to an end as the result of the rise of new powers in Asia. He focussed on the threat of conflict between the US and China, America's eroding global position and rivalries between China and its neighbours. The book was called "masterly" by the Sunday Times and "superb" by The Daily Telegraph. British historian, Paul Kennedy, said – "This is truly one of those works you can say you wished our political leaders would read and ponder its great implications."

In 2022 his third book, The Age of the Strongman: How the Cult of the Leader Threatens Democracy around the World, was published. It was named a Best Book of the Year by The Economist, Foreign Affairs, The Times (UK) and Sunday Times.

In 2026 his fourth book, War Is Interested in You: The Breakdown of International Order and the Threat of World War Three, was published. The title comes from a line attributed to Leon Trotsky: "You may not be interested in war. But war is interested in you." Rachman contends that the era of relative stability among the great powers is over. In his account, American pre-eminence after the Cold War has eroded, and Russia, China, Iran and North Korea are now seeking to overturn the international order; the book assesses how likely it is that the conflicts in Ukraine and the Middle East, and the rivalry over East Asia, could widen into a global war. It draws on Rachman's conversations with political leaders and intelligence officials over his years as a foreign affairs commentator. A US edition is scheduled for publication by Yale University Press in February 2027.

== Awards ==
As well as winning the Orwell and European Press Prize awards, Rachman was named foreign commentator of the year in Britain's comment awards in 2010. The Observer has also listed him as one of Britain's 300 leading intellectuals. He has been a visiting fellow at the Woodrow Wilson School at Princeton University (1988–89) and at the Nobel Institute in Oslo (2013).

== Works ==
- — (2011) [2010]. Zero-Sum World: Politics, Power and Prosperity after the Crash. London: Atlantic Books. ISBN 978-1-84887-704-7.
- — (2016). Easternisation: War and Peace in the Asian Century. London: The Bodley Head. ISBN 978-1-84792-333-2.
- — (2022). The Age of the Strongman: How the Cult of the Leader Threatens Democracy around the World. London: The Bodley Head. ISBN 978-1-84792-641-8.
- — (2026). War Is Interested in You: The Breakdown of International Order and the Threat of World War Three. London: The Bodley Head. ISBN 978-1-84792-898-6.
