= Dani Garavelli =

Scottish journalist (born 1967)

- Born: August 1967 (age 59); Scotland
- Occupations: Journalist, columnist, broadcaster
- Notable work: Jailed, Failed, Forgotten (London Review of Books, 2025); Waiting for the Van (BBC Radio 4)
- Awards: Scottish Press Awards Feature Writer of the Year (2019); Nicola Barry Award (inaugural winner); Anne Brown Essay Prize (2021)

Dani Garavelli (born August 1967) is a Scottish freelance journalist, columnist and occasional broadcaster based in Glasgow. She is known for feature writing, reportage and opinion journalism, and has been a finalist for the Orwell Prize for Journalism.

== Early life ==
Garavelli was born in August 1967 and grew up on the Ayrshire coast as the daughter of an Italian immigrant from Lucca; she has written about her Italian-Scottish heritage in her award-winning essay The Bequest.

== Career ==
Garavelli has written features, interviews, reportage, reviews and opinion columns for publications including The Scotsman, Scotland on Sunday, The Times, The Guardian, The Herald, the London Review of Books, Prospect, The Big Issue and The Glasgow Bell. She wrote a regular column for Scotland on Sunday for two decades before stepping down in 2020. She is a columnist for The Herald.

She has also made several BBC Radio 4 documentaries, including Scotland's Uncivil War, on rifts within the SNP, and Waiting for the Van, on an activist's attempt to set up a safer drug consumption vehicle.

In 2025, Garavelli was shortlisted for the Orwell Prize for Journalism for work published in the London Review of Books and The Glasgow Bell, including her long-form piece Jailed, Failed, Forgotten on deaths in custody in Scotland.

== Awards and recognition ==
- Feature Writer of the Year, Scottish Press Awards (2019), for work in The Scotsman and Scotland on Sunday.
- Inaugural winner of the Nicola Barry Award, established by Women in Journalism Scotland.
- Inaugural winner of the Anne Brown Essay Prize (2021), for The Bequest, an essay on her Italian-Scottish heritage.
- Finalist, Orwell Prize for Journalism (2025).

== Personal life ==
Garavelli lives in Glasgow.
