= Sheila Riddell =

Scottish academic (born 1953)

- Born: 2 December 1953 (age 71)
- Known for: Education and social justice research

Sheila Riddell (born 2 December 1953), is an academic at the University of Edinburgh and Director of the Centre for Research in Education Inclusion and Diversity (CREID). She has also been Director of the Strathclyde Centre for Disability Research, University of Glasgow. Her research interests include equality and social inclusion in education and adult education, with particular reference to gender, social class and disability.

== Early life ==
At Boston High School, she took part in the school dramatic society, and gained 9 O-levels in 1970. In 1972 she gained A-levels in English, French and German.

== Career ==
Riddell's work has mapped the development of policy and support for vulnerable groups and believes that social justice, equality and inclusion are complex and inter-linked concepts in social policy rhetoric^{[5]}. She has published a number of books on disability and on the gender balance of teachers in primary and secondary teaching in Scotland. She has spoken out on issues of support for vulnerable pupils in Scottish schools, free higher education and argued that free tuition had not “markedly altered” recruitment to Scottish universities of those from the poorest backgrounds.

She was commissioned by Universities Scotland to undertake a review into the evidence of what works in widening access. Universities undertake widening participation activities and are set external benchmarks to address inequalities in the take-up of higher education opportunities among different social groups. The purpose behind strategic efforts within the sector and in government is to ensure that student bodies at universities reflect the diversity represented in wider society. She recommended that universities should carry out more evaluation of projects and initiatives to widen access including tracking of students. ^{[10]} She reviewed access for The Sutton Trust in a report on Access in Scotland.

Riddell's sister is the journalist Mary Riddell and she is married to Ken Sorbie, Professor of Petroleum Engineering at Heriot-Watt University since 1992.
