= James Ferguson (minister) =

Scottish minister

James Ferguson (1621–1667), was a Scottish minister.

== Biography ==
Ferguson belonged to the Fergusons of Kilkerran. He graduated at Glasgow University in 1638, and was ordained minister of Kilwinning, Ayrshire, in 1643. He was a member of the assembly of 1648, and declined calls to both Edinburgh and Glasgow.

He was so highly esteemed by the Earl of Eglintoun that, though appointed to the chair of divinity at Glasgow in 1661, he never left Kilwinning to enter on that office. He was a man of eminent piety, and at the same time "much admired", as a writer of his life in Wodrow's Analecta says, "for his great and singular wisdom and prudence, being reckoned one of the wisest men in a nation, most fit to be a counsellor to any monarch in Europe".

In the controversy between the resolutioners and protesters he adopted the side of the former, but it is recorded that he confessed before his death that he was wrong. Probably in consequence of the support of Lord Eglintoun, he was not interfered with at the Restoration in his ministry at Kilwinning. He died 13 March 1667.

== Works ==
Ferguson is remembered and esteemed at this day as the author of a series of excellent commentaries on St. Paul's Epistles. In Charteris's Catalogue of Scotch Divines he is called an author "of great reputation". Spurgeon characterises his commentaries as those of "a grand, gracious, savoury divine".

His works are:

1. Expositions of the Epistles to the Philippians and Colossians, Edinburgh, 1656.
2. Expositions of the Epistles to Galatians and Ephesians, Edinburgh, 1659.
3. Exposition of the Epistles to the Thessalonians, Glasgow, 1675.
4. Refutation of the Errors of Toleration, Erastianism, Independency, and Separation, Edinburgh, 1692.

He also issued several sermons, and left in manuscript an essay on singing the psalms.

== Family ==
He married Jean Inglis (d. 1687), by whom he had two sons, James and Hew, and a daughter, Mary, wife of Robert Cheislie, an Edinburgh merchant.
