= Ordinary People (Evans novel) =

2018 novel by Diana Evans

- First edition (publ. Chatto & Windus)
- Author: Diana Evans
- Language: English
- Publication date: 2018

Ordinary People is a 2018 novel by Diana Evans.

The book received positive reviews from The Guardian and The New Yorker. It was shortlisted for the 2019 Women's Prize for Fiction.
