= John Peet (born 1954) =

British journalist and author (born 1954)

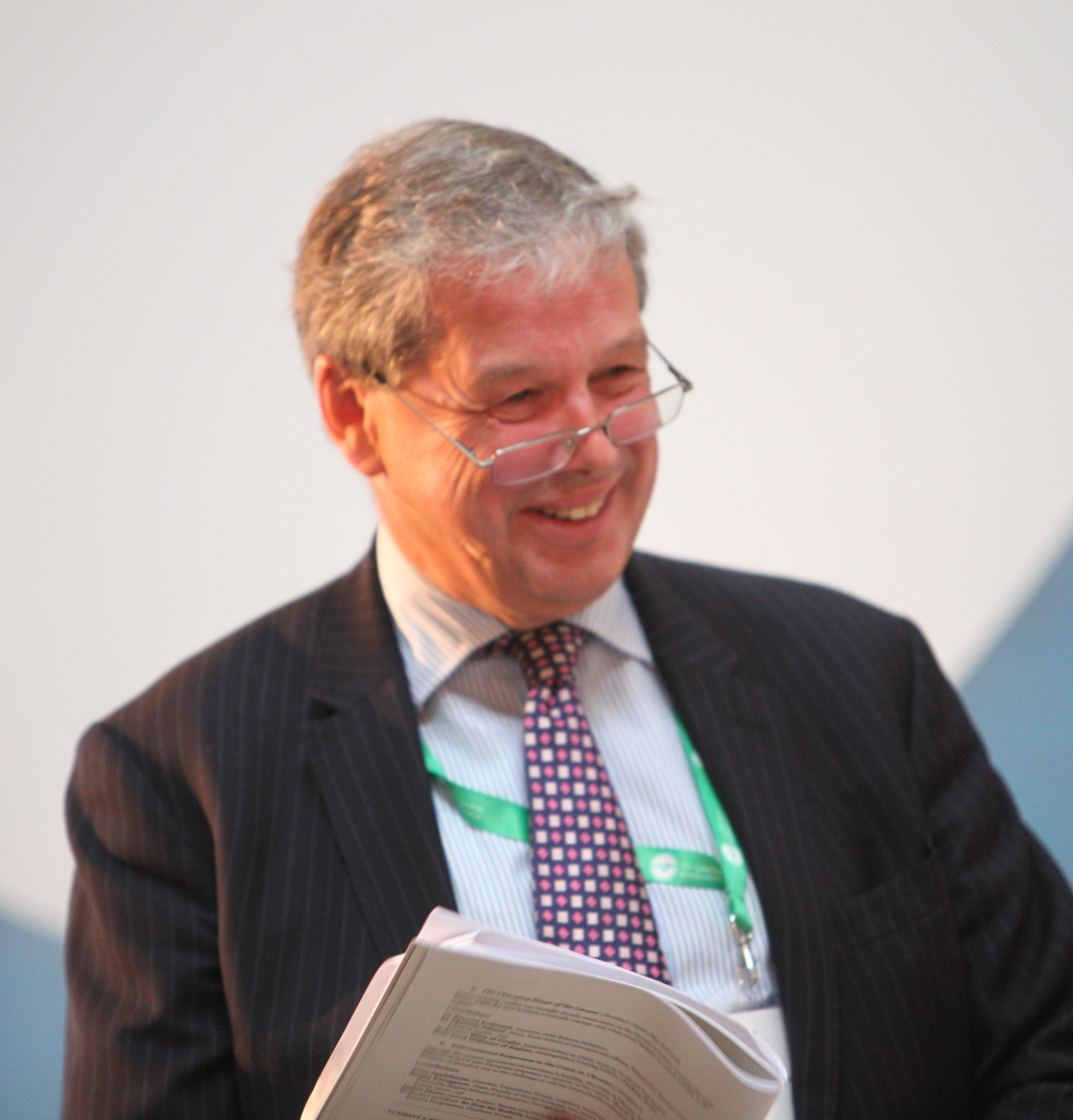
- Peet in 2015
- Born: 8 May 1954 (age 71); Mombasa, Kenya.
- Occupation: Journalist
- Employer: The Economist
- Partner: Sara Staite
- Children: Three

John Peet (born 8 May 1954) is a British journalist and author, who is at present the political editor of The Economist newspaper. He was previously Europe editor from 2003 to 2015, and is widely considered an expert on European affairs.

Born in Mombasa as the elder son of Frank and June Peet, he grew up in Kenya where his father held a government position until 1963 when the family relocated to Oxfordshire.

He was educated at The Pilgrims' School, Charterhouse and St John's College, Cambridge, where he was awarded an academic scholarship. Whilst there, he took supervisions from the former Governor of the Bank of England, Mervyn King. Peet was an active member of the Disraelians, a political club in Cambridge supporting more conservative fiscal policy. He graduated in 1975 with an MA degree in economics.

Peet has written several Economist special reports on subjects including water, the future of Europe, Ireland, Turkey, and Britain's relationship with the EU. A report on France, published in autumn 2012, prompted criticism from the Government of France, owing to its negative assessment of the government's handling of the French economy. His first book, co-written with Anton La Guardia, is entitled 'Unhappy Union', and focuses on the European Union and the euro area crisis. It was published in September 2014 to widespread critical acclaim.

Before his appointment as Political editor, Peet held the positions of Health correspondent, Washington, D.C. correspondent, Brussels correspondent, Britain correspondent, Executive editor, Surveys editor, Business Affairs editor, and Europe editor. Prior to his career at The Economist, he was a civil servant, working for the British Treasury and Foreign Office (1976 to 1986).

Peet currently has homes in London and Wiltshire. He is married with three children.

== Articles ==
- "Europe isn't working – Governments will be tempted by the wrong policies to tackle unemployment", The Economist (13 November 2009).
- "The Time Bomb at the Heart of Europe", The Economist (17 November 2012)

== Interviews ==
- (Greek) "Το πραγματικό πρόβλημα είναι η Ισπανία", An interview with John Peet by Κυριακάτικη Ελευθεροτυπία (Kyriakatiki Eleftherotypia) {Sunday edition of the Greek daily} (7 February 2010).
- John Peet, Europe Editor of The Economist, talks about his survey of Italy (24 November 2005).
- John Peet, Europe Editor of The Economist, talks about his survey of Ireland (14 October 2004).

== Awards ==
- 2012 Gerald Loeb Award for Commentary for "Euro Zone"
