= Mary Riddell =

British journalist

Mary Carmella Riddell (born 19 April 1952) is a British journalist. She has been a newspaper columnist for The Observer. and The Daily Telegraph, and served as the latter newspaper's assistant editor.

== Early life ==
Her parents married in 1948; Carmella Brett and Leslie Riddell. Her grandfather was John George Riddell, who looked after Grimsby fish market, and died in May 1949.

Riddell was born in Grimsby, at Nunsthorpe Maternity Home, and first lived at 147 Scartho Road. She attended Boston High School, a girls' grammar school. In March 1965, she took part in a production of 'Blue Murder' by Kenneth Lillington, and as Arabella in Three Blind Mice by Cuthbert Taylor. She represented Holland in county cross country competitions in 1970. In 1970 she took part in the Lincolnshire Youth Theatre. She gained English, French and German A-levels in 1970.

She studied Modern Languages at the University of Nottingham. She grew up in a Catholic family with sisters Sheila and Maddi and brother John. Her sister is Professor Sheila Riddell (born 2 December 1953), an academic at the University of Edinburgh and Director of the Centre for Research in Education Inclusion and Diversity (CREID), who is married to Professor Ken Sorbie, Professor of Petroleum Engineering at Heriot-Watt University since 1992.

== Career ==
From 2001 to 2008, she was a columnist for The Observer. She has also contributed to the Daily Mail and the New Statesman. Earlier in her career she was deputy editor of the Today newspaper, and women's and assistant editor of the Daily Mirror.

Riddell is a member of the advisory board of Out of Trouble, which is affiliated with the Prison Reform Trust.

== Personal life ==
Her mother (Emmeline Mary) Carmella, who died in Boston, Lincolnshire in 2006 aged 86, was appointed MBE in the 1988 New Year Honours for charity work in Boston for Bangladesh. In 1954 her father became chief executive of Holland County Council; her father died in January 1991, in the Pilgrim Hospital.

She married John Shute, with two sons, born in the mid-1980s.
