= Lions, Donkeys and Dinosaurs =

2006 non-fiction book by Lewis Page

- Author: Lewis Page
- Language: English
- Subject: Armed Forces
- Genre: Military science
- Publisher: Arrow Books
- Publication date: 2006
- Publication place: United Kingdom
- Media type: Hardcover, Paperback

Lions, Donkeys and Dinosaurs is a non-fiction book by Lewis Page criticising the British Armed Forces for waste and incompetence.

== Background and contents ==
Page contends that inter-service rivalry, bureaucracy and second-rate equipment waste taxpayer's money and risk the lives of soldiers. He is particularly critical of the Eurofighter Typhoon, the Type 45 destroyer and the Nimrod MRA4 maritime patrol aircraft as being both overpriced and of little military value. Above all, he criticises BAE Systems, the British defence company involved in these projects, for huge cost-overruns and poor workmanship. He argues that the UK government should purchase cheaper and better weapons from foreign sources (usually American), rather than continue to prop up BAE.

Page argues that some weapons, including heavy artillery, tanks, frigates and destroyers, are rendered obsolete by modern airpower and that the UK should scrap most or all of its capacity in these areas.

== Reception and reviews ==
Max Hastings, writing in the Daily Telegraph, praised the force and humour of the writing, and the comprehensive and informed nature of the criticism. Nicholas Fearn, in The Independent the book deserved to be a best-seller, although objected to Page's exclusive focus on the need for fighting current wars. However, Allan Mallinson, writing in The Times, stated that the book was "shot through with inaccuracies (he seems to believe everything he was told) and his remarks are frequently facile, which undermines his judgment on important procurement issues he raises". He admitted that it and another work were "a start nevertheless".

== See also ==
- Lions led by donkeys
