= James E. Ferguson II =

American lawyer (1942–2025)

James Elliott Ferguson II (October 10, 1942 – July 21, 2025) was an American lawyer.

== Life and career ==
Ferguson was born on October 10, 1942, in Asheville, North Carolina, the youngest of 7 children. His parents, James and Nina, sold coal and kindling, working for wealthy white families. He enrolled at North Carolina Central University, where he was elected student body president, and got a degree in 1964 in English and history. He then got a scholarship to Columbia Law, where he graduated in 1967. Due to being born in the Jim Crow era, he took an interest in racial equality, and soon got involved in desegregation efforts.

He returned to North Carolina, and became a partner at what he described as "Charlotte's first integrated law firm", Ferguson, Stein, Chambers, Gresham and Sumter, with the goal of aiding the civil rights movement. Early in his career, he worked on cases that promoted busing students as a means of integration, such as the Supreme Court case Swann v. Charlotte-Mecklenburg Board of Education. While working on the case, his office was intentionally lit on fire in an attack.

Ferguson was involved in the Wilmington Ten, a case that involved America’s first political prisoners of conscience, as declared by Amnesty International. Forty years later, he secured pardons for the defendants. He also worked on the case of the Charlotte Three, civil rights activists who were accused of arson, and in the exoneration of Darryl Hunt, who was accused of murder. He was a council at the American Civil Liberties Union, and was the president of North Carolina Advocate for Justice. He would give many lectures, including in Apartheid South Africa and at Harvard Law school, until his retirement in 2014.

Ferguson died of COVID-19 and pneumonia on July 21, 2025, at the age of 82.
