= David Pilling =

British journalist and author

David Pilling is a British journalist and author.

== Career ==
He is the Africa editor and a columnist for the Financial Times. His 2018 book The Growth Delusion was shortlisted for the Orwell Prize.

In 2011 and 2012, he was named Best Commentator by the Society of Publishers in Asia. Also in 2011, he was named Best Foreign Commentator in the Editorial Intelligence Comment Awards for his coverage of China, Japan and Pakistan.

== Books ==
- The Growth Delusion (2018)
- Bending Adversity: Japan and the Art of Survival (2016)
