= Heidi Blake =

British journalist and author

- Born: Heidi Laura Blake; 1986 (age 39–40); Chatham, Kent, England
- Education: University of York

Heidi Laura Blake (born April 1986) is an English journalist and author. She is the former assistant editor of The Sunday Times. Since 2022, she has been working as an investigative reporter for The New Yorker, based in the United Kingdom.

== Education ==
In 2008, Blake earned a degree in English and Politics with honors at the University of York.

== Career ==
Blake worked for the Daily Telegraph. There she worked on a December 2010 undercover sting on Vince Cable. In 2011, she began working for the Sunday Times. In 2015, she was hired by BuzzFeed to head its UK investigative journalism team.

In 2022, she joined The New Yorker as a contributing writer.

== Awards and honors ==
In 2007, Blake, as editor of her university paper Nouse, won Student Journalist of the Year, feature writer of the year, and diversity writer of the year in the National Student Media Awards sponsored by The Guardian.

In 2014, Blake and Jonathan Calvert won three British Journalism Awards for their work as The Sunday Times’s Insight Team, including two for their FIFA investigation.

In 2022, she won first place in the Katherine Schneider Journalism Award for Excellence in Reporting on Disability in the Large Media Category with Katie J.M. Baker for the story "Beyond Britney: Abuse, Exploitation, and Death Inside America’s Guardianship Industry," for BuzzFeed News.

In 2024, Blake was shortlisted for the Orwell Prize for Journalism for her investigative work on the Saudi royal family.

== Books ==
- With Jonathan Calvert The Ugly Game: The Corruption of FIFA and the Qatari Plot to Buy the World Cup
- From Russia with Blood: The Kremlin’s Ruthless Assassination Program and Vladimir Putin’s Secret War on the West
