= James Ferguson (Queen's Park footballer) =

Scottish footballer

Personal information
- Full name: James Ferguson
- Place of birth: Scotland
- Position: Goalkeeper

Senior career*
Years	Team	Apps	(Gls)
- Dreghorn
1956–1957	Queen's Park	5	(0)
1957–1958	Third Lanark	3	(0)

International career
1957	Scotland Amateurs	1	(0)
- * Club domestic league appearances and goals

James Ferguson was a Scottish amateur football goalkeeper who played in the Scottish League for Queen's Park. He was capped by Scotland at amateur level.
