= John Kampfner =

British journalist

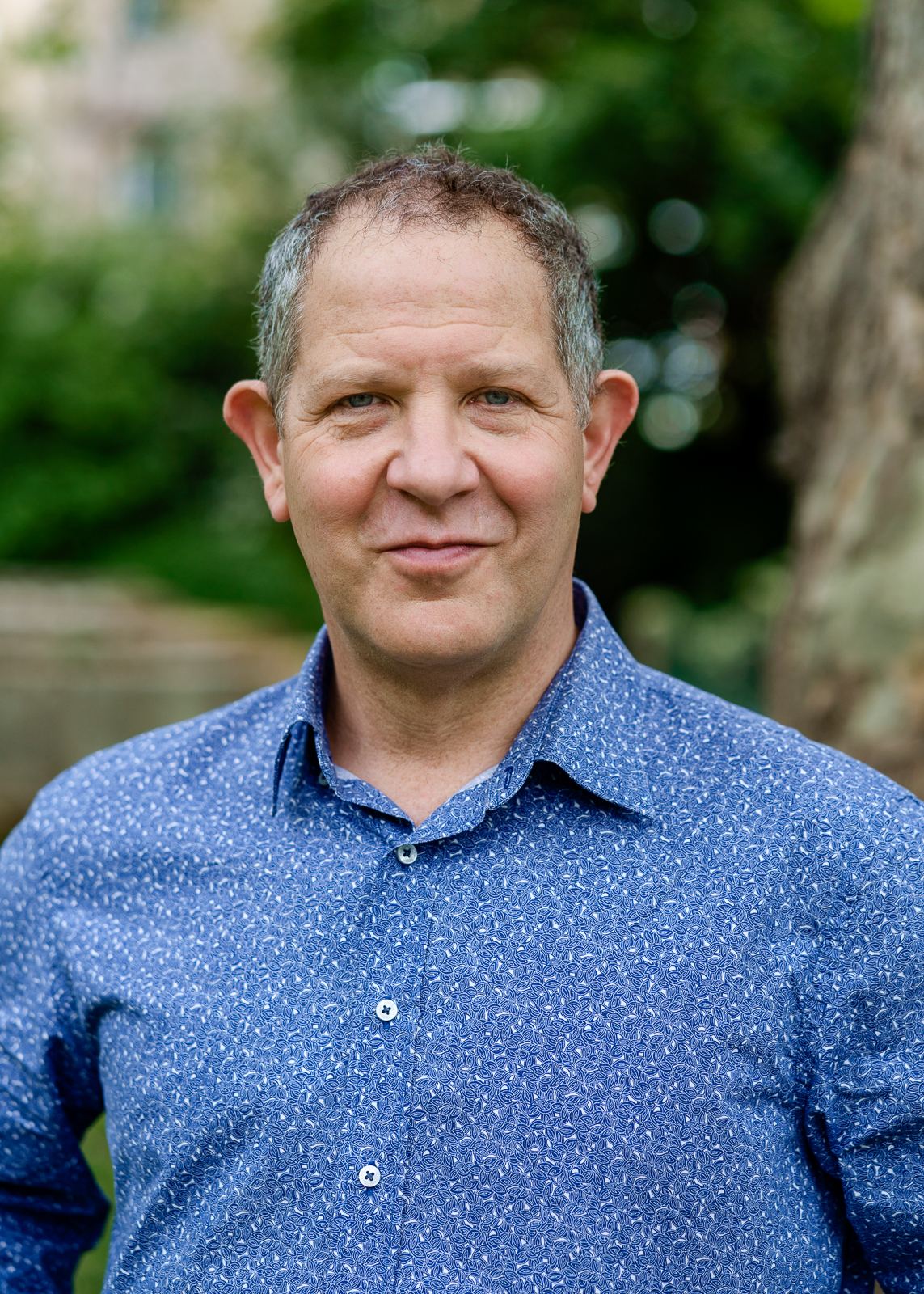
- Born: Singapore
- Education: The Hall School, Hampstead; Westminster School
- Alma mater: The Queen's College, Oxford
- Occupations: Author, broadcaster and commentator
- Spouse: Lucy Ash (m. 1992)
- Children: 2

John Kampfner is a British author, broadcaster and commentator.

Kampfner's latest book, his eighth, Braver New World, will be published in April 2026.

Since 2019, he has been a Senior Associate Fellow at the Royal United Services Institute (RUSI), a defence and security think tank. In 2022-2023 Kampfner was Executive Director of the UK in the World Programme at Chatham House.

Since 2022, he has been Chair of the Young Königswinter conference, which brings young people together from Germany and the UK. Kampfner is also Deputy Chair of the Deutsch-Britische Gesellschaft (German-British Association). From 2024-2025 he was a Fellow at the Institute for Advanced Study (Wissenschaftskolleg) in Berlin.

Kampfner is currently a regular contributor to politico, Foreign Policy and The Guardian. He also writes columns for the FT, The New World, The Independent, Der Spiegel, and Die Zeit. He is also a regular broadcaster and programme maker for the BBC. His most recent documentary was for BBC Radio 4 marking the centenary of Mein Kampf.

== Books ==
Kampfner has written seven books. These include: Inside Yeltsin's Russia: Corruption, Conflict, Capitalism (1994), an account of the early years of post-Communism; a 1998 biography of former Labour Foreign Secretary Robin Cook, and a study of Tony Blair's interventionist foreign policy Blair's Wars (2003), which gave one of the first authoritative accounts of the Iraq war and used in subsequent Whitehall enquiries, as well as school and university texts. His book Freedom For Sale: How We Made Money And Lost Our Liberty (2009) is an analysis of the seeming abandonment of liberty in the names of democracy and capitalism. The book was shortlisted for the Orwell Book prize in April 2010. The Rich, a 2000-year history, from slaves to super-yachts, is a historical comparison between contemporary oligarchs and those down the ages.

His sixth book Why The Germans Do It Better, Notes From A Grown-Up Country, was published by Atlantic in August 2020. A Sunday Times bestseller for many weeks in both hardback and paperback, the book received positive reviews and coverage in The Guardian, The Times, The Sunday Times, The Economist, New Statesman, TLS and Literary Review. It was chosen as one of the books of the year in 2020 and 2021 in a number of newspapers.

Kampfner's most recent book, In Search of Berlin, The Story of a Reinvented City, was published in hardback in 2023 to wide acclaim. It received positive reviews and coverage from The Times, Der Spiegel, the FT, and the Literary Review. It was long listed for the Ondaatje prize and was a Waterstones history book of the month. The paperback edition came out in autumn 2024.

== Career ==
Kampfner began his career as a foreign correspondent for Reuters in Moscow and Bonn. He moved to The Daily Telegraph, first in East Berlin where he reported on the fall of the Berlin Wall and the unification of Germany, and then as Bureau Chief in Moscow at the time of the dissolution of the Soviet Union. He went on to become chief political correspondent at the Financial Times (1995-1998) and political commentator for the BBC's Today radio programme and political correspondent on Newsnight (1998-2000).

In 2002 Kampfner won the Foreign Press Association awards for Film of the Year and Journalist of the Year for The Ugly War, a two-part BBC film on the Israeli–Palestinian conflict. His film War Spin, exposing the propaganda behind the rescue of Jessica Lynch, received considerable publicity in the US and UK.

Kampfner was editor of the New Statesman from 2005 to 2008. He was the British Society of Magazine Editors Current Affairs Editor of the Year in 2006.

He was named one of the 1000 most influential Londoners in the Evening Standard Progress 1000 survey in 2015, 2016 and 2017.

In 2008 he was Founder Chair of Turner Contemporary, an art gallery in Margate designed by architect Sir David Chipperfield which has been seen as a model of arts-based regeneration. During his time, he welcomed the Queen and the Duchess of Cambridge on visits. In December 2015 he stepped down after seven and a half years.

Kampfner was chair of the Clore Social Leadership Programme between 2014 and 2018, a charity which nurtures leaders in the charity sectors. He was also a member of the Council of King's College London for three years.

He was Chief Executive of the freedom of expression organisation Index on Censorship between 2008 and 2012. From 2012 to 2014, he was an external consultant for Google on freedom of expression and culture.

In 2014, he established the Creative Industries Federation, a national organisation to represent the arts, creative industries and cultural education.

In 2019 he was appointed Chair of the House of Illustration, subsequently renamed the Quentin Blake Centre for Illustration.

In the same year, he was awarded an honorary doctorate by Bath Spa University for services to arts education and the creative industries.

== Early life and education ==
Kampfner was born in Singapore to a Jewish father from Bratislava and a Protestant mother from Chatham, Kent. He was educated at Westminster School. He went to The Queen's College, Oxford, where he received a BA degree in Modern History and Russian.

== Personal life ==
In 1992, Kampfner married BBC journalist, broadcaster and author Lucy Ash. The couple live in Berlin and London. They have two daughters.

Media offices
Preceded by Peter Wilby	Editor of the New Statesman; 2005–2008	Succeeded by Jason Cowley
