= Al-Britannia, My Country =

Journalistic book on British Islam

Al-Britannia, My Country: A Journey Through Muslim Britain
- Author: James Fergusson
- Language: English
- Subject: Islam in the United Kingdom
- Published: London
- Publisher: Bantam Press
- Publication date: 2017
- Pages: 385
- ISBN: 978-0-593-07737-5 (Hardcover)
- Dewey Decimal: 305.6970941

Al-Britannia, My Country is a 2017 book by Scottish journalist and author James Fergusson investigating Islam in the United Kingdom.

== Background and synopsis ==
Al-Britannia, My Country is an exploration of British Muslim communities amidst rising racial and religious tensions in the United Kingdom. It examines the links between Muslim communities and poverty, government surveillance and social and religious conflicts on issues such as sex and feminism.

== Reception ==
Christopher de Bellaigue, writing for The Guardian described Al-Britannia, My Country as a "compelling and compassionate survey of British Islam" and describes Fergusson as "well placed to discuss the issues of identity, inclusion and the state that are central to the Muslim predicament."

Sam Kiley, Foreign Affairs Editor of Sky News writing for the London Evening Standard depicted the book as "a meandering trek through British Muslim 'heartlands', from High Wycombe to Bradford, Whitechapel to Dewsbury and Glasgow."

In contrast, writing in The Times, Douglas Murray, a neo-conservative writer known for his criticism of Islam, criticised the book as "unforgivably naive and insultingly thin"
