= Coolie Woman =

2013 book by Gaiutra Bahadur

Coolie Woman: The Odyssey of Indenture
- First edition (India)
- Author: Gaiutra Bahadur
- Language: English
- Published: 2013
- Publisher: C. Hurst & Co. (UK); University of Chicago Press (US) Hachette India
- Publication place: England

Coolie Woman (full title: Coolie Woman: The Odyssey of Indenture) is a book written by Gaiutra Bahadur and co-published in 2013 by Hurst and Company of London in Europe and the University of Chicago Press in the US. Editions from Hachette in India in 2013 and Jacana in South Africa in 2014 followed.

The book is a biography of Sujaria, the great-grandmother of the author and simultaneously an exploration of the indentured labor system, which was practiced in the Caribbean. Tracing Sujaria's 1903 journey as a Brahmin caste woman from Bihar, India's poorest state, to the sugarcane plantations of British Guiana, Bahadur wove both archival and published records, as well as folk and oral sources, to tell the broader story of "the exodus and settlement of Indian women to the Caribbean". She critically examined the caste system, Indian family structure, and the indenture system itself in an attempt to understand how each of these shaped her grandmother and how migration changed or affected women's lives. The word coolie, which was used in the Atlantic World to refer to primarily Indian and Chinese indentured workers from Asia, is considered a pejorative. Bahadur chose the title to acknowledge the stigma but also as a metaphor for the baggage women carried as a result of colonialism.

Reviewers have pointed to the importance the work holds for a "neglected area of scholarship", about the age when Asian indentured workers replaced African slaves on plantations in the Caribbean, as well as its exploration of feminist themes of societal and family oppression, poverty, lack of power, sexual abuse and violence. Praised for her storytelling, as well as academic treatment, the book has appeal for both scholars and casual readers. Coolie Woman was shortlisted for multiple literary awards, including the Bocas Prize for Caribbean Literature (2014) and the Orwell Prize in Britain (2014). It won the 2014 Caribbean Studies Association's Gordon K. and Sybil Lewis Prize, which annually recognizes interdisciplinary works that examine Caribbean culture and society, have been published within the preceding three years, and are written in one of the languages prevalent in the region. The Chronicle of Higher Education included the book in its round-up of the best scholarly books of the decade in 2020.
