= James Ferguson (Cowdenbeath and Dumbarton footballer) =

Scottish footballer

Personal information
- Place of birth: Halbert, Scotland

Senior career*
Years	Team	Apps	(Gls)
1905–1912	Cowdenbeath	91	(9)
1911–1915	Dumbarton	94	(6)
- * Club domestic league appearances and goals

James Ferguson was a Scottish football player, who played for Cowdenbeath and Dumbarton during the 1900s and 1910s.
