= Gaiutra Bahadur =

Guyanese-American writer

- Born: New Amsterdam, East Berbice-Corentyne, Guyana
- Education: Yale University; Columbia University Graduate School of Journalism
- Occupations: Writer and journalist
- Writing career
- Language: English
- Notable work: Coolie Woman: The Odyssey of Indenture

Gaiutra Bahadur is a Guyanese-American writer. She is best known for Coolie Woman: The Odyssey of Indenture, which was shortlisted for the Orwell Prize in 2014.

== Early life ==
Bahadur was born in New Amsterdam, East Berbice-Corentyne, in rural Guyana and emigrated to the United States with her family when she was six years old. She grew up in Jersey City, New Jersey, and earned her bachelor's degree, with honors in English Literature, at Yale University and her master's degree in journalism at Columbia University.

== Career ==
Before winning a Nieman Fellowship at Harvard University when she was 32, Bahadur was a staff writer for The Philadelphia Inquirer and the Austin American-Statesman. In her decade as a daily newspaper reporter, she covered politics, immigration and demographics in Texas, Pennsylvania and New Jersey and spent three months in the spring of 2005, during the Iraq war, as a foreign correspondent in Knight Ridder's Baghdad bureau. Since then, she has worked as an essayist, literary critic and freelance journalist, contributing to The New York Times Book Review, The New York Review of Books, The Nation, The New Republic, Dissent and other publications.

Her book Coolie Woman was published in 2013. It is partly a narrative history of indentured women in the Caribbean and partly a family history focusing on her great-grandmother, Sujaria, who left Calcutta for British Guiana in 1903 to work as an indentured plantation labourer. The book was a finalist for the 2014 Orwell Prize and the Center for Documentary Studies Writing Prize at Duke University, and it won the New Jersey State Council on the Arts Award for Prose and Gordon K. and Sybil Lewis Prize. The Chronicle of Higher Education included the book in its round-up of the best scholarly books of the decade in 2020.

Bahadur collaborated with poet and translator Rajiv Mohabir to recover the only known text by an indentured immigrant in the Anglophone Caribbean, a songbook by Lal Bihari Sharma, first published as a pamphlet in India in 1915. Mohabir's English translation, I Even Regret Night: Holi Songs of Demerara, was published in 2019 with an afterword by Bahadur, who first encountered the text in the British Library while doing research for Coolie Woman.

Bahadur is an associate professor of English and journalism at Rutgers University-Newark and has taught creative nonfiction at the University of Basel in Switzerland and Caribbean literature at City College of New York.

== Bibliography ==
Books

- Coolie Woman. University of Chicago Press. Co-published by C. Hurst & Co in the UK, Hachette in India and Jacana in South Africa. 2013. ISBN 978-0226034423.
- Family Ties. Scholastic. 2012. ISBN 978-0531225547.

Afterwords

- Rescued from the Footnotes of History Afterword to I Even Regret Night. Kaya Press. 2019. ISBN 978-1885030597.
- A House Filled with Women: In Memory of Meena Alexander Afterword to Fault Lines. Feminist Press Press. 2020. ISBN 978-1936932993.

Anthologies

Nonfiction

- How Could I Write About Women Whose Existence Is Barely Acknowledged? In Craft and Conscience: How to Write About Social Issues. Beacon Press. 2022. ISBN 978-0807046494.
- Tales of the Sea. In We Mark Your Memory: Writing from the Descendants of Indenture. The University of London. 2018. ISBN 978-1912250073.
- Of Islands and Other Mothers. In Nonstop Metropolis. University of California Press. 2016. ISBN 978-0520285958.
- Ogling the Statue of Liberty. In Living on the Edge of the World. Touchstone/Simon & Schuster. 2007. ISBN 978-0743291606.

Fiction

- The Stained Veil. In Go Home!. Feminist Press. 2018. ISBN 978-1936932016.

Notable articles and essays

- Various articles for The Nation, The New Republic, The New York Review of Books, The New York Times Book Review, Dissent), The Virginia Quarterly Review, The Boston Review, and Lapham's Quarterly

== Major awards and recognition ==
- 2007–2008 – Nieman Fellow, Harvard University
- 2013 – New Jersey State Council on the Arts Award for Prose
- 2014
  - Orwell Prize (shortlist), Coolie Woman
  - Bocas Prize for Caribbean Literature (nonfiction shortlist), Coolie Woman
- 2015 – MacDowell Artists Colony Residency
- 2016–2017 – Fellow, Hutchins Center for African and African American Studies, Harvard University
- 2018
  - Literary Arts Residency, Bellagio Center in Italy, The Rockefeller Foundation
  - Scholar-in-Residence, The Schomburg Center for Research in Black Culture, The New York Public Library
- 2019 – New Jersey State Council on the Arts Award for Prose
- 2019-2020 – Literary Fellow, Bard at the Brooklyn Public Library
- 2023 – Inaugural Ramesh and Leela Narain Fellow, The University of Cambridge
