= Jonathan Calvert =

British investigative journalist

Jonathan Calvert is a British investigative journalist and Sunday Times editor. He has won two British Sports Journalism Awards and shared a Paul Foot Award with Heidi Blake for their 2015 exposé of FIFA. He was named journalist of the year at the 2015 British Journalism Awards.
