= Bibliography of the post-Stalinist Soviet Union =

This is a select bibliography of English language books (including translations) and journal articles about the post-Stalinist era of Soviet history. A brief selection of English translations of primary sources is included. The sections "General surveys" and "Biographies" contain books; other sections contain both books and journal articles.

Works listed here are cited in the notes or bibliographies of scholarly sources. Each is published by an academic or major press, written by a recognized expert, or substantially reviewed in scholarly journals; borderline cases are omitted. A selection of primary sources are included. Many of the books below carry their own bibliographies; see the Further reading section for other bibliographies, and the External links section for historical sites, academic sites, and museums.

Citations follow APA style. (Note: Entries are in plain text APA 7 format without templates; templates are used only for reviews and notes.) Book have citations to academic journal or mainstream published reviews when available. For books only partly about the subject, relevant chapter or section titles are provided when useful and available. Translators of the original-language edition are included when possible. In cases where a title or name has appeared with more than one English spelling, the most recent published form is used and a footnote documents any earlier title under which the work appeared.

== Overviews of Russian history ==
General works on Russian history which have significant context for Russian history in general or content about this bibliography's timeframe of history.

- Acton, E. (1995). Russia: The tsarist and Soviet legacy (2nd ed.). Longman.
- Ascher, A. (2017). Russia: A short history (3rd rev. ed.). Oneworld Publications.
- Auty, R., & Obolensky, D. D. (Eds.). (1976–1981). Companion to Russian studies (3 vols.). Cambridge University Press.
- Bartlett, R. P. (2005). A history of Russia (Macmillan Essential Histories). Palgrave Macmillan.
- Billington, J. H. (1966). The icon and the axe: An interpretive history of Russian culture. Alfred A. Knopf.
- Blackwell, W. L. (1994). The industrialization of Russia: A historical perspective (3rd ed.). Harlan Davidson.
- Blum, J. (1961). Lord and peasant in Russia from the ninth to the nineteenth century. Princeton University Press.
- Bogatyrev, S. (Ed.). (2004). Russia takes shape: Patterns of integration from the Middle Ages to the present. Finnish Academy of Science and Letters.
- Borrero, M. (2004). Russia: A reference guide from the Renaissance to the present. Facts on File.
- Boterbloem, K. (2018). A history of Russia and its empire: From Mikhail Romanov to Vladimir Putin (2nd ed.). Rowman & Littlefield.
- Boterbloem, K. (2020). Russia as empire: Past and present. Reaktion Books.
- Breyfogle, N., Schrader, A., & Sunderland, W. (Eds.). (2007). Peopling the Russian periphery: Borderland colonization in Eurasian history. Routledge.
- Bushkovitch, P. (2011). A concise history of Russia. Cambridge University Press.
- Chatterjee, C. (2022). Russia in world history: A transnational approach. Bloomsbury Academic.
- Cherniavsky, M. (Ed.). (1970). The structure of Russian history: Interpretive essays. Random House.
- Christian, D. (1998–2018). A history of Russia, Central Asia and Mongolia (2 vols.). Blackwell; Wiley-Blackwell.
- Clarkson, J. D. (1969). A history of Russia (2nd ed.). Random House.
- Connolly, R. (2020). The Russian economy: A very short introduction. Oxford University Press.
- Dmytryshyn, B. (Ed.). (1991). Medieval Russia: A source book, 850–1700 (3rd ed.). Holt, Rinehart and Winston.
- Dmytryshyn, B. (1977). A history of Russia. Prentice-Hall.
- Dukes, P. (1998). A history of Russia: Medieval, modern, contemporary, c. 882–1996 (3rd ed.). Duke University Press.
- Evtuhov, C., Goldfrank, D., Hughes, L., & Stites, R. (2004). A history of Russia: Peoples, legends, events, forces. Houghton Mifflin.
- Figes, O. (2022). The story of Russia. Metropolitan Books.
- Forsyth, J. (1992). A history of the peoples of Siberia: Russia's North Asian colony 1581–1990. Cambridge University Press.
- Freeze, G. L. (Ed.). (2009). Russia: A history (3rd ed.). Oxford University Press.
- Gleason, A. (Ed.). (2009). A companion to Russian history (Wiley-Blackwell Companions to World History). Wiley-Blackwell.
- Grousset, R. (1970). The empire of the steppes: A history of Central Asia (N. Walford, Trans. (Note: Original-language edition: Grousset, R. (1939). L'empire des steppes: Attila, Gengis-Khan, Tamerlan. Payot. Walford's translation was made from the revised 1952 French edition.)). Rutgers University Press.
- Hosking, G. (1997). Russia: People and empire, 1552–1917. Harvard University Press.
- Hosking, G. (2001). Russia and the Russians: A history. Harvard University Press.
- Kochan, L., & Abraham, R. (1983). The making of modern Russia (2nd ed.). Penguin Books.
- Lieven, D. (2000). Empire: The Russian empire and its rivals. John Murray.
- Lieven, D., Perrie, M., & Suny, R. (Eds.). (2006). The Cambridge history of Russia (3 vols.). Cambridge University Press. (Note: The Cambridge History of Russia: Volume 1, From early Rus' to 1689; Volume 2, Imperial Russia, 1689–1917; Volume 3, The twentieth century.)
- Longworth, P. (2005). Russia: The once and future empire from pre-history to Putin. St. Martin's Press.
- Mazour, A. G. (1962). Russia: Tsarist and communist. Van Nostrand.
- Moss, W. G. (1997–2005). A history of Russia (2 vols.; 2nd ed., 2003–2005). Anthem Press.
- Pares, B. (1953). A history of Russia (definitive ed.). Alfred A. Knopf.
- Pipes, R. (1974). Russia under the old regime. Charles Scribner's Sons.
- Poe, M. T. (2003). The Russian moment in world history. Princeton University Press.
- Riasanovsky, N. V., & Steinberg, M. D. (2025). A history of Russia (10th ed.). Oxford University Press.
- Shubin, D. H. (2005). A history of Russian Christianity (4 vols.). Algora Publishing.
- Sumner, B. H. (1943). A short history of Russia. Reynal & Hitchcock.
- Vernadsky, G. (1943–1969). A history of Russia (5 vols.). Yale University Press. (Note: Vernadsky's five volumes are as follows: Vol. 1: Ancient Russia (1943); Vol. 2: Kievan Russia (1948); Vol. 3: The Mongols and Russia (1953); Vol. 4: Russia at the dawn of the modern age (1959); Vol. 5: The tsardom of Moscow, 1547–1682 (2 parts, 1969).)
- Vernadsky, G. (1961). A history of Russia (6th rev. ed.). Yale University Press.
- Ward, C. J., & Thompson, J. M. (2021). Russia: A historical introduction from Kievan Rus' to the present (9th ed.). Routledge.
- Wren, M. C., & Stults, T. (2009). The course of Russian history (5th ed.). Waveland Press.

== General surveys of Soviet history ==
These works contain significant overviews of the Post-Stalinist era.

- Cohen, S. F. (2011). Rethinking the Soviet Experience: Politics and History since 1917. New York: Oxford University Press.
- Figes, O. (2015). Revolutionary Russia, 1891–1991. New York: Metropolitan Books.
- Heller, M., Nekrich, A. M., & Carlos, P. B. (1986). Utopia in Power: The History of the Soviet Union from 1917 to the present. New York: Simon and Schuster.
- Hosking, G. (1987). The First Socialist Society: A History of the Soviet Union from Within (Second Edition). Cambridge, MA: Harvard University Press.
- Kort, M. G. (2019). The Soviet Colossus (8th Edition). London, UK: Routledge.
- Kenez, P. (2017). A History of the Soviet Union from the Beginning to its Legacy. New York: Cambridge University Press.
- Lewin, M. (2016). The Soviet Century. (G. Elliot, Ed.). New York: Verso.
- Malia, M. (1995). Soviet Tragedy: A History of Socialism in Russia 1917–1991. New York: Free Press.
- Mccauley, M. (2007). The Rise and Fall of the Soviet Union. London, UK: Routledge.
- Nove, A. (1993). An Economic History of the USSR 1917-1991 (3rd Edition). London, UK: Arkana Publishing.
- Suny, R. G. (Ed.). (2006). The Cambridge History of Russia: Volume 3, The Twentieth Century. Cambridge, UK: Cambridge University Press. (Note: Contains a 60 page scholarly select bibliography of works relating to the history of the Soviet Union.)
- ——. (2013). The Structure of Soviet History: Essays and Documents (2nd ed.). New York: Oxford University Press.

== Period studies ==
- Beschloss, M. R. (1991). The Crisis Years: Kennedy and Khrushchev, 1960–1963. New York: E. Burlingame Books.
- Cousins, N. (1972). The Improbable Triumvirate: John F. Kennedy, Pope John, Nikita Khrushchev. New York: W.W. Norton.
- Dornberg, J. (1974). Brezhnev: The Masks of Power. New York: Basic Books.
- Hornsby, R. (2023). The Soviet Sixties. Yale University Press. (Note: The Soviet Sixties covers the period from the death of Stalin in 1953 to the invasion of Czechoslovakia in 1968.)
- McCauley, M. (Ed.). (1987). Khrushchev and Khrushchevism. Bloomington: Indiana University Press.
- McGlinchey, E. (2014). Fast Forwarding the Brezhnev Years: Osh in Flames. Russian History, 41(3), 373–391.
- Rutland, P., & Smolkin-Rothrock, V. (2014). Looking Back at Brezhnev. Russian History, 41(3), 299–306.
- Smith, M. B. (2026). Exit Stalin: The Soviet Union as a civilization, 1953–1991. W. W. Norton & Company.
- Strong, J. W. (1971). The Soviet Union under Brezhnev and Kosygin: The Transition Years. New York: NY: Van Nostrand Reinhold.
- Tatu, M. (1974). Power in the Kremlin: From Khrushchev to Kosygin (2nd Edition). New York: Viking Press.
- Tompson, W. J. (2014). The Soviet Union under Brezhnev. London, UK: Routledge.
- Willerton, J. (1987). Patronage Networks and Coalition Building in the Brezhnev Era. Soviet Studies, 39(2), 175–204.
- Zubok, V. M. (2007). A Failed Empire: The Soviet Union in the Cold War from Stalin to Gorbachev. Chapel Hill: The University of North Carolina Press.

== Social history ==
- Cook, L. J. (1993). The Soviet Social Contract and Why It Failed: Welfare Policy and Workers' Politics from Brezhnev to Yeltsin. Cambridge, MA: Harvard University Press.
- Dimitrov, M. (2014). Tracking Public Opinion Under Authoritarianism: The Case of the Soviet Union During the Brezhnev Era. Russian History, 41(3), 329–353.
- Galmarini, M. (2016). The Right to Be Helped: Deviance, Entitlement, and the Soviet Moral Order (NIU Series in Slavic, East European, and Eurasian Studies). DeKalb: Northern Illinois University Press.
- Hopkins, M. W. (1985). Russia's Underground Press: The Chronicle of Current Events. New York: Praeger.
- Hosking, G. A. (1991). The Awakening of the Soviet Union. Cambridge, MA: Harvard University Press.
- Kerblay, B., & Swyer, R. (1983). Modern Soviet Society. New York: Pantheon.
- Kozlov, D., & Gilburd, E. (Eds.). (2013). The Thaw: Soviet Society and Culture during the 1950s and 1960s. Toronto: University of Toronto Press.
- LaPierre, B. (2012). Hooligans in Khrushchev's Russia: Defining, Policing, and Producing Deviance during the Thaw. Madison, WI: University of Wisconsin Press.
- Lorimer, F. (1979). The Population of the Soviet Union: History and Prospects. New York: AMS Press.
- Mawdsley, E., & White, S. (2004). The Soviet Elite from Lenin to Gorbachev: The Central Committee and Its Members, 1917–1991. Oxford: Oxford University Press.
- Matthews, M. (1989). Patterns of Deprivation in the Soviet Union Under Brezhnev and Gorbachev. Stanford: Hoover Institution Press.
- ———. (2011). Education in the Soviet Union: Policies and Institutions Since Stalin. London: Routledge.
- Millar, J. R. (1988). Politics, Work, and Daily Life in the USSR: A Survey of Former Soviet Citizens. Cambridge: Cambridge University Press.
- Raleigh, D. (2011). Soviet Baby Boomers: An Oral History of Russia's Cold War Generation. New York: Oxford University Press.
- Roucek, J. (1961). The Soviet Treatment of Minorities. Phylon, 22(1), 15–23.
- Shtromas, A., Wenturis, N., & Hornung, K. (1990). Political Change and Social Development: The Case of the Soviet Union. Frankfurt: Peter Lang Publishing.
- Weinberg, E. (1992). Perestroika and Soviet Sociology. The British Journal of Sociology, 43(1), 1–10.

=== Culture ===
- Bittner, S.V. (2001). Remembering the Avant-Garde: Moscow Architects and the "Rehabilitation" of Constructivism, 1961–64. Kritika: Explorations in Russian and Eurasian History. 2(3), 553–576.
- Congdon, L. (2017). Solzhenitsyn: The Historical-Spiritual Destinies of Russia and the West (NIU Series in Slavic, East European, and Eurasian Studies). DeKalb: Northern Illinois University Press.
- Epstein, M. (2019). The Phoenix of Philosophy. Russian thought of the late Soviet period (1953-1991). London: Bloomsbury Academic.
- Johnson, P. (1965). Khrushchev and the Arts: The Politics of Soviet Culture, 1962–1964. Cambridge, MA: MIT Press.
- Kirk, T.C. (2020). Memory of Vorkuta: A Gulag Returnee's Attempts at Autobiography and Art. Kritika: Explorations in Russian and Eurasian History, 21(1), 97–126
- Majsova, N. (2020). Soviet Science Fiction Cinema and the Space Age: Memorable Futures. Lanham: Lexington Books.
- Morson, G. S. (1979). Socialist Realism and Literary Theory. The Journal of Aesthetics and Art Criticism, 38(2), 121–133.
- Nove, A. (1983). The Class Nature of the Soviet Union Revisited. Soviet Studies, 35(3), 298–312.
- Plamper, J. (2005). Cultural Production, Cultural Consumption: Post-Stalin Hybrids. Kritika: Explorations in Russian and Eurasian History. 6(4), 755–762.
- Pyzhikov, A. V. (2011). The Cult of Personality During the Khrushchev Thaw. Russian Studies in History, 50(3), 11–27.
- Reid, S. E. (2016). (Socialist) Realism Unbound: The Effects of International Encounters on Soviet Art Practice and Discourse in the Khrushchev Thaw. In J. Bazin, P. D. Glatigny, & P. Piotrowski (Eds.), Art beyond Borders: Artistic Exchange in Communist Europe (1945-1989) (pp. 267–295). Budapest: Central European University Press.
- Senelick, L., & Ostrovsky, S. (Eds.). (2014). The Soviet Theater: A Documentary History. New Haven: Yale University Press.
- Shkandrij, M. (2001). Russia and Ukraine: Literature and the Discourse of Empire from Napoleonic to Postcolonial Times. Montreal & Kingston: McGill-Queen's Press.
- Stites, R. (1992). Russian Popular Culture: Entertainment and Society Since 1900. Cambridge, UK: Cambridge University Press.
- Zubok, V. M. (2011). Zhivago's Children: The Last Russian Intelligentsia. Cambridge, MA: Harvard University Press.

=== Ethnic groups ===
- Armstrong, J. L. (1990). Policy Toward the Polish Minority in the Soviet Union, 1923–1989. The Polish Review, 35(1), 51–65.

=== Religion ===
- Adams, A. S., & Shevzov, V. (Eds.). (2018). Framing Mary: The Mother of God in Modern, Revolutionary, and Post-Soviet Russian Culture. DeKalb: Northern Illinois University Press.
- Budnitskii, O., Engel, D., Estraikh, G., & Shternshis, A. (2022). Jews in the Soviet Union: A History. (Note: Currently Volume 3: War, Conquest, and Catastrophe, 1939–1945; and Volume 5: After Stalin, 1953–1967 are available of this multi-volume project.) New York: NYU Press.
- Dobson, M. (2014). Child Sacrifice in the Soviet Press: Sensationalism and the "Sectarian" in the Post-Stalin Era. The Russian Review, 73(2), 237–259.
- Givens, J. (2018). The Image of Christ in Russian Literature: Dostoevsky, Tolstoy, Bulgakov, Pasternak (NIU Series in Slavic, East European, and Eurasian Studies). DeKalb: Northern Illinois University Press.
- King, R. (1975). Religion and Communism in the Soviet Union and Eastern Europe. Brigham Young University Studies, 15(3), 323–347.
- Kowalewski, D. (1980). Protest for Religious Rights in the USSR: Characteristics and Consequences. The Russian Review, 39(4), 426–441.
- Larson, N. D. (2014). Aleksandr Solzhenitsyn and the Modern Russo-Jewish Question. New York: Columbia University Press.
- Pinkus, B. (2009). The Jews of the Soviet Union: The History of a National Minority (Cambridge Russian, Soviet and Post-Soviet Studies). Cambridge: Cambridge University Press.
- Pospielovsky, D. (1984). The Russian Church under the Soviet Regime, 1917–1982. Crestwood: St. Vladimir's Seminary Press.
- Ramet, S. P. (1993). Religious Policy in the Soviet Union. Cambridge: Cambridge University Press.
- Ro'i, Y. (2009). The Struggle for Soviet Jewish Emigration, 1948-1967 (Cambridge Russian, Soviet and Post-Soviet Studies). Cambridge: Cambridge University Press.
- Rosenthal, B. G. (Ed.). (1997). The Occult in Russian and Soviet Culture. New York: Cornell University Press.
- Rywkin, M. (2015). Moscow's Muslim Challenge: Soviet Central Asia. New York: Routledge.
- Smolkin-Rothrock, V. (2014). The Ticket to the Soviet Soul: Science, Religion, and the Spiritual Crisis of Late Soviet Atheism. The Russian Review, 73(2), 171–197.
- Steeves, P. (1986). The June 1983 Plenum and the Post-Brezhnev Antireligious Campaign. Journal of Church and State, 28(3), 439–457.
- Warhola, J. (1991). The Religious Dimension of Ethnic Conflict in the Soviet Union. International Journal of Politics, Culture, and Society, 5(2), 249–270.

=== Gender and sexuality ===
- Alexander, R. (2021). Regulating Homosexuality in Soviet Russia, 1956–91: A Different History. Manchester: Manchester University Press.
- Cohn, E. (2009). Sex and the Married Communist: Family Troubles, Marital Infidelity, and Party Discipline in the Postwar Ussr, 1945-64. The Russian Review, 68(3), 429–450.
- Dumanèiã, M. (2021). Men Out of Focus: The Soviet Masculinity Crisis in the Long Sixties. Toronto: University of Toronto Press.
- Engel, B. (1987). Women in Russia and the Soviet Union. Signs, 12(4), 781–796.
- Engel, B. A. (2021). Marriage, Household, and Home in Modern Russia from Peter the Great to Vladimir Putin (The Bloomsbury History of Modern Russia Series). London and New York: Bloomsbury Academic.
- Ewing, E. T. (2010). Separate Schools: Gender, Policy, and Practice in Postwar Soviet Education (NIU Series in Slavic, East European, and Eurasian Studies). DeKalb: Northern Illinois University Press.
- Ilic, M. (Ed.). (2017). The Palgrave Handbook of Women and Gender in Twentieth-Century Russia and the Soviet Union. Palgrave Macmillan.
- Kolchevska, N. (2005). Angels in the Home and at Work: Russian Women in the Khrushchev Years. Women's Studies Quarterly, 33(3/4), 114–137.
- Lapidus, G. W. (1979). Women in Soviet Society: Equality, Development and Social Change. Berkeley: University of California Press.
- McCallum, C. E. (2015). Scorched by the Fire of War: Masculinity, War Wounds and Disability in Soviet Visual Culture, 1941–65. The Slavonic and East European Review, 93(2), pp. 251–285.
- Shoemaker, S. (1983). The Status of Women in the Rural U.S.S.R. Population Research and Policy Review, 2(1), 35–51.

=== Children and family ===
- Edgar, A., & Frommer, B. (Eds.). (2020). Intermarriage from Central Europe to Central Asia: Mixed Families in the Age of Extremes. Lincoln: University of Nebraska Press.
- Fitzpatrick, S. (2022). The Women's Side of the Story: Soviet "Displaced Persons" and Postwar Repatriation. The Russian Review, 81(2) 284–301.
- Friedman, R. (2020). Modernity, Domesticity and Temporality in Russia: Time at Home. London: Bloomsbury.
- Pushkareva, N. And Zhidchenko, A. (2022). Women Scholars of Akademgorodok: Everyday Life in a Soviet University Town during the Thaw. The Russian Review, 81(2) 302–324.
- Smith, M. B. (2022). Equality, Welfare, Myth, and Memory: The Artek Pioneer Camp at the Height of the Khrushchev Era. Kritika: Explorations in Russian and Eurasian History, 23(2), pp. 255–287.

=== Human rights ===
- Alexeyeva, L. (1985). Soviet Dissent: Contemporary Movements for National, Religious, and Human Rights. Middletown: Wesleyan University Press.
- Behrends, J. C., Kolář, P., & Lindenberger, T. (Eds.). (2022). Violence After Stalin: Institutions, Practices, and Everyday Life in the Soviet Bloc 1953–1989. Stuttgart: ibidem Press.
- Bergman, J. (2009). Meeting the Demands of Reason: The life and thought of Andrei Sakharov. Ithaca: Cornell University Press.
- Bukovskiĭ, V. K. (2019). Judgment in Moscow: Soviet Crimes and Western Complicity. (A. Kojevnikov, Trans.) Westlake Village: Ninth Of November Press. (Note: Originally published in Russian in 1995.)
- Prigge, W. (2004). The Latvian Purges of 1959: A Revision Study. Journal of Baltic Studies, 35(3), 211–230.
- Snyder, S. B. (2013). Human Rights Activism and the End of the Cold War. New York: Cambridge University Press.

=== Rural life, labor, and agriculture ===
- Frese, S. (2004). Comrade Khrushchev and Farmer Garst: East-West Encounters Foster Agricultural Exchange. The History Teacher, 38(1), 37–65.
- Hale-Dorrell, A. (2015). The Soviet Union, the United States, and Industrial Agriculture. Journal of World History, 26(2), 295–324.
- Laird, R. (1974). Soviet Agriculture in 1973 and Beyond in Light of United States Performance. The Russian Review, 33(4), 372–385.
- Luxenburg, N. (1971). Soviet Agriculture since Khrushchev. The Russian Review, 30(1), 64–68.
- Millar, J. R., & University of Illinois, & Symposium. (1971). The Soviet Rural Community: A Symposium. Urbana: University of Illinois Press.
- Nove, A. (1970). Soviet Agriculture under Brezhnev. Slavic Review, 29(3), 379–410.
- Volin, L. (1970). A Century of Russian Agriculture: From Alexander II to Khrushchev. Cambridge, MA: Harvard University Press.

=== Urban life, labor, and industry ===
==== Energy ====
- Gustafson, T. (1989). Crisis amid Plenty: The Politics of Soviet Energy under Brezhnev and Gorbachev. Princeton: Princeton University Press.
- Josephson, P. (1996). Atomic-Powered Communism: Nuclear Culture in the Postwar USSR. Slavic Review, 55(2), 297–324.
- Reisinger, W. M. (1992). Energy and the Soviet Bloc: Alliance Politics after Stalin. Washington DC: NCROL.
- Ward, C. (2009). Brezhnev's Folly: The Building of BAM and Late Soviet Socialism. Pittsburgh, PA: University of Pittsburgh Press.

==== Urbanization ====
- Colton, T. J. (2014). Moscow: Governing the Socialist Metropolis. Cambridge, MA: Harvard University Press.
- Mëhilli, E. (2012). The Socialist Design: Urban Dilemmas in Postwar Europe and the Soviet Union. Kritika: Explorations in Russian and Eurasian History. 13(3), 635–665.
- Obertreis, J. (2013). Soviet Urban Planning, Housing Policies, and De-Stalinization. Kritika: Explorations in Russian and Eurasian History. 14(3), 673–682.
- Varga-Harris, C. (2015). Stories of House and Home: Soviet Apartment Life during the Khrushchev Years. Ithaca: Cornell University Press.

==== Labor ====
- Morcom, S. (2020). Work and Soviet Society after Stalin: Discourses of 'Labour Discipline' and the Law in the USSR, 1956–1991. The Slavonic and East European Review, 98(1), 106–138.
- Ruble, B. (2011). Soviet Trade Unions: Their Development in the 1970s (Cambridge Russian, Soviet and Post-Soviet Studies). Cambridge: Cambridge University Press.
- Siegelbaum, L. H., & Suny, R. G. (1994). Making Workers Soviet: Power, Class, and Identity. Ithaca: Cornell University Press.
- Siegelbaum, L. H. (2006). The Late Romance of the Soviet Worker in Western Historiography. International Review of Social History, 51(3), 463–481.

=== Other topics ===
- Frank, W. D. (2013). Everyone to Skis!: Skiing in Russia and the Rise of Soviet Biathlon (NIU Series in Slavic, East European, and Eurasian Studies). DeKalb: Northern Illinois University Press.

== Government and politics ==
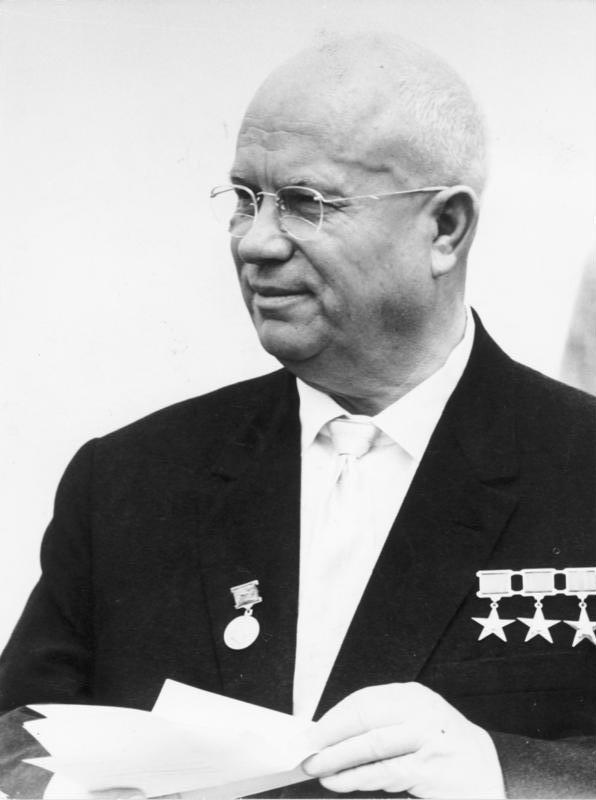
Nikita S. Khrushchev

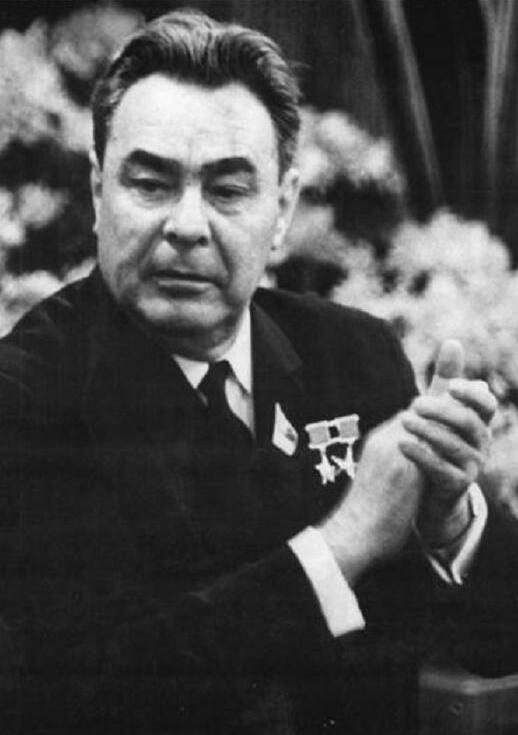
Leonid Brezhnev

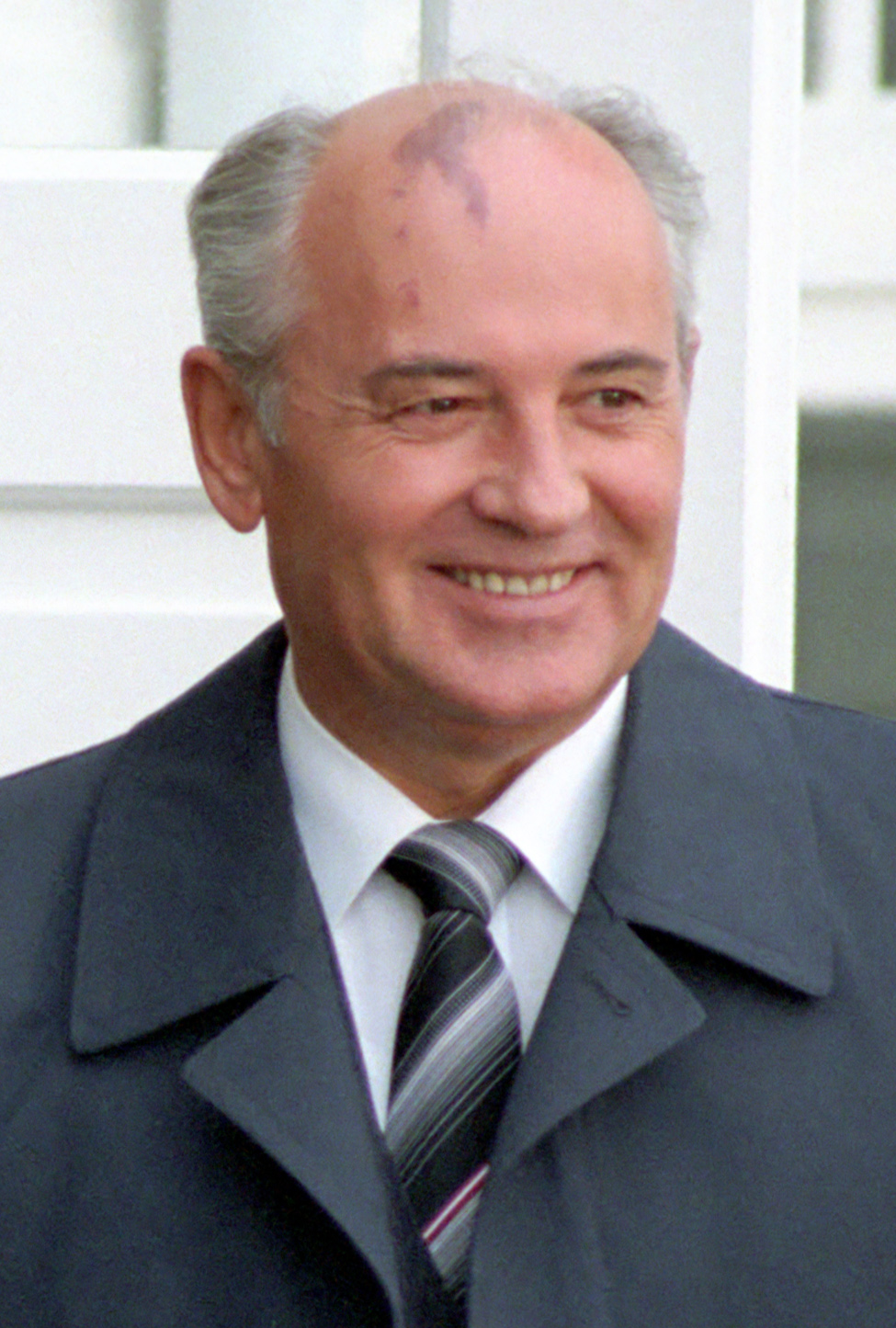
Mikhail Gorbachev

- Albats, Y. (1994). The State Within a State: The KGB and Its Hold on Russia-Past, Present, and Future. New York: Farrar Straus & Giroux.
- Andrew, C. M., & Mitrokhin, V. (2001). The Sword and the Shield: The Mitrokhin Archive and the Secret History of the KGB. New York: Basic Books.
- Bacon, E., & Sandle, M. (2002). Brezhnev Reconsidered. New York: Palgrave Macmillan.
- Beisinger, M., & Beissinger, M. (1982). Finding an Heir to Brezhnev. Harvard International Review, 5(2), 8–12.
- Bhupinder Brar. (1994). Assessing Gorbachev. Economic and Political Weekly, 29(24), 1465–1475.
- Belova, E., & Lazarev, V. (2013). Funding Loyalty: The Economics of the Communist Party (Hoover Series on Authoritarian Regimes). New Haven: Yale University Press.
- Blackwell, R. (1980). After Brezhnev: Muddling through the Succession. World Affairs, 142(4), 268–281.
- Breslauer, G. W. (1983). Khrushchev and Brezhnev as Leaders: Building Authority in Soviet Politics. London, UK: George Allen & Unwin.
- ———. (2010). Gorbachev and Yeltsin as Leaders. Cambridge: Cambridge University Press.
- Brown, A. (1984). The Soviet Succession: From Andropov to Chernenko. The World Today, 40(4), 134–141.
- ———. (2004). The Gorbachev Factor. New York: Oxford University Press.
- Bryant, J., Trump, A., & Meyer, W. (1983). Andropov's Inherited Headache. Harvard International Review, 5(5), 39–41.
- Duhamel, L. (2010). The KGB Campaign against Corruption in Moscow, 1982–1987. Pittsburgh, PA: University of Pittsburgh Press.
- Gardner, T. (1984). Andropov: One Year Later. Harvard International Review, 6(4), 22–23.
- Gidadhubli, R. (1977). The Brezhnev Constitution. Economic and Political Weekly, 12(48), 1981–1984.
- ———. (1984). Andropov's Last Testament. Economic and Political Weekly, 19(16), 668–671.
- Glazov, Y. (1983). Yuri Andropov: A New Leader of Russia. Studies in Soviet Thought, 26(3), 173–215.
- Gorlizki, Y., & Khlevniuk, O. (2020). Substate Dictatorship: Networks, Loyalty, and Institutional Change in the Soviet Union. New Haven: Yale University Press.
- Harasymiw, B. (1988). The CPSU in Transition from Brezhnev to Gorbachev. Canadian Journal of Political Science, 21(2), 249–266.
- Hoffmann, E. (1984). Soviet Politics in the 1980s. Proceedings of the Academy of Political Science, 35(3), 227–240.
- Hyland, W. (1985). The Gorbachev Succession. Foreign Affairs, 63(4), 800–809.
- Jaura, J. (1979). Aftermath of 'Brezhnev Bombshell'. Economic and Political Weekly, 14(45), 1834–1834.
- Kaiser, R. G. (1991). Gorbachev: Triumph and Failure. Foreign Affairs, 70(2), 160–174.
- ———. (1992). Why Gorbachev Happened: His Triumphs, His Failure, and His Fall. New York: Simon and Schuster.
- Kelley, D. R. (1986). The Politics of Developed Socialism: The Soviet Union as a Post-Industrial State. New York: Greenwood Press.
- ———. (1987). Soviet Politics from Brezhnev to Gorbachev. New York: Praeger.
- Löwenhardt, J., Ozinga, J. R., & Ree, E. (1992). The Rise and Fall of the Soviet Politburo. London: UCL Press.
- Mitrokhin, N. (2014). The CPSU Central Committee Apparatus, 1970–85: Personnel and Role in the Soviet Political System. Russian History, 41(3), 307–328.
- Nechemias, C. (1978). The Khrushchev And Brezhnev Eras: A Comparison Of Social Welfare Policies. Social Science Quarterly, 59(3), 562–569.
- Rigby, T. H., Brown, A, & Reddaway, P. (Eds.). (1980). Authority, Power and Policy in the USSR: Essays Dedicated to Leonard Schapiro. New York: Palgrave Macmillan.
- Ryavec, K. (1982). The Soviet Leadership Succession: Change & Uncertainty. Polity, 15(1), 103–122.
- Sakwa, R. (1990). Gorbachev and His Reforms, 1985–1990. New York: Prentice-Hall.
- Sapiets, J. (1972). The 24th Congress of the Soviet Communist Party. The Russian Review, 31(1), 11–24.
- Schapiro, L. (1978). The Communist Party of the Soviet Union (2nd Edition). London, UK: Methuen Publishing.
- Smith, J. and Ilić, M. (Eds.). (2011). Khrushchev in the Kremlin: Policy and Government in the Soviet Union, 1953–1964. New York: Routledge.
- Surovell, J. (1994). Gorbachev's Last Year: Leftist or Rightist?. Europe-Asia Studies, 46(3), 465–487.
- Tompson, W. J. (1991). The Fall of Nikita Khrushchev. Soviet Studies, 43(6), 1101–1121.
- ———. (1993). Khrushchev and Gorbachev as Reformers: A Comparison. British Journal of Political Science, 23(1), 77–105.
- Von Beyme, K. (1975). A Comparative View of Democratic Centralism. Government and Opposition, 10(3), 259–277.
- Walker, M. (1988). The Waking Giant: Gorbachev's Russia. New York: Pantheon Books.
- Wallace, M., Suedfeld, P., & Thachuk, K. (1996). Failed Leader or Successful Peacemaker? Crisis, Behavior, and the Cognitive Processes of Mikhail Sergeyevitch Gorbachev. Political Psychology, 17(3), 453–472.
- Zemtsov, I. (1983). Andropov: Policy Dilemmas and the Struggle for Power. Jerusalem: Israel Research Institute of Contemporary Society.
- Willerton, J. (2009). Patronage and Politics in the USSR (Cambridge Russian, Soviet and Post-Soviet Studies). Cambridge: Cambridge University Press.

=== De-Stalinisation ===
- Blum, A., Koustova, E., Grieve, M., & Duthreuil, C. (2018). Negotiating Lives, Redefining Repressive Policies: Managing the Legacies of Stalinist Deportations. Kritika: Explorations in Russian and Eurasian History. 19(3), 537–571.
- Bohn, T. M., Einax, R., & Abesser, M. (2014). De-Stalinisation Reconsidered: Persistence and Change in the Soviet Union. Frankfurt: Campus Verlag.
- Dobson, M. (2009). Khrushchev's Cold Summer: Gulag Returnees, Crime, and the Fate of Reform after Stalin. Ithaca: Cornell University Press.
- ———. (2011). The Post-Stalin Era: De-Stalinization, Daily Life, and Dissent. Kritika: Explorations in Russian and Eurasian History. 12(4), 905–924.
- Filtzer, D. (1992). Soviet Workers and De-Stalinization: The Consolidation of the Modern System of Soviet Production Relations, 1953–1964. Cambridge, UK: Cambridge University Press
- ———. (1993). The Khrushchev Era: De-Stalinization and the Limits of Reform in the USSR, 1953–1964. London, UK: Macmillan.
- Khlevniuk, O., & Dowling, R. (2015). No Total Totality: Forced Labor, Stalinism, and De-Stalinization. Kritika: Explorations in Russian and Eurasian History. 16(4), 961–973.
- Kirk, T.C. (2020). Memory of Vorkuta: A Gulag Returnee's Attempts at Autobiography and Art. Kritika: Explorations in Russian and Eurasian History, 21(1), 97–126
- Obertreis, J. (2013). Soviet Urban Planning, Housing Policies, and De-Stalinization. Kritika: Explorations in Russian and Eurasian History. 14(3), 673–682.
- Tucker, R. (1957). The Politics of Soviet De-Stalinization. World Politics, 9(4), 550–578.
- Weiner, A. (2006). The Empires Pay a Visit: Gulag Returnees, East European Rebellions, and Soviet Frontier Politics. The Journal of Modern History, 78(2), 333–376.
- Wojnowski, Z. (2012). De-Stalinization and Soviet Patriotism: Ukrainian Reactions to East European Unrest in 1956. Kritika: Explorations in Russian and Eurasian History. 13(4), 799–829.

=== Glasnost and Perestroika ===
- Aganbegi︠a︡n, A. G., & Barratt, B. M. (1988). The Challenge: Economics of Perestroika. London: Hutchinson.
- Battle, J. (1988). Uskorenie, Glasnost' and Perestroika: The Pattern of Reform under Gorbachev. Soviet Studies, 40(3), 367–384.
- Boym, S. (1990). Paradoxes of Perestroika. Agni, (31/32), 16–24.
- Brown, A. (2013). Seven Years that Changed the World: Perestroika in Perspective. New York: Oxford University Press.
- Cohen, S. F., & Heuvel, K. (1989). Voices of Glasnost: Interviews with Gorbachev's Reformers. New York: W.W. Norton & Co.
- Frank, P. (1990). The End of "Perestroika". The World Today, 46(5), 87–89.
- Gellner, E. (1990). Perestroika Observed. Government and Opposition, 25(1), pp3–15.
- Gibbs, J. (1999). Gorbachev's Glasnost: The Soviet Media in the First Phase of Perestroika. College Station: Texas A & M University Press.
- Gooding, J. (1990). Gorbachev and Democracy. Soviet Studies, 42(2), 195–231.
- Gorbachev, M. S. (1991). Perestroika: New Thinking for our Country and the World. New York: HarperCollins.
- Gorbachev, M., Mlynář, Z., & Shriver, G. (2012). Conversations with Gorbachev: On Perestroika, the Prague Spring, and the Crossroads of Socialism. New York: Columbia University Press.
- Gordon, L., & Nazimova, A. (1990). Perestroika in Historical Perspective: Possible Scenarios. Government and Opposition, 25(1), 16–29.
- Lane, D. S. (1992). Soviet Society under Perestroika. London: Routledge.
- Lever, J. (1988). Perestroika: The Re-organisation of Economic Life in the Soviet Union. South African Sociological Review, 1(1), 39–49.
- Mason, D. S. (1988). Glasnost, Perestroika and Eastern Europe. International Affairs, 64(3), 431–448.
- McForan, D. (1988). Glasnost, Democracy, and Perestroika. International Social Science Review, 63(4), 165–174.
- McNair, B. (1991). Glasnost, Perestroika, and the Soviet Media. London: Routledge.
- Nove, A. (2012). Glasnost' in Action: Cultural Renaissance in Russia. London: Routledge.
- Parker, R. (1989). Assessing Perestroika. World Policy Journal, 6(2), 265–296.
- Rand, R. (1989). Perestroika up Close. The Wilson Quarterly, 13(2), 51–58.
- Shulgan, C. (2011). The Soviet Ambassador: The Making of the Radical Behind Perestroika. Toronto: Emblem.
- Tarasulo, I. J. (1990). Gorbachev and Glasnost: Viewpoints from the Soviet Press. Lanham, MD: Rowman & Littlefield Publishers.
- ———. (1991). Perils of Perestroika: Viewpoints from the Soviet Press, 1989–1991. Lanham, MD: Rowman & Littlefield Publishers.
- Vithal, B. (1988). Perestroika: The Revolution Resumed. Social Scientist, 16(10), 3–30.

=== Soviet Armed Forces ===
- Colton, T. J. (2014). Commissars, Commanders, and Civilian Authority: The Structure of Soviet Military Politics. Cambridge, MA: Harvard University Press.
- Kolkowicz, R. (1967). The Soviet Military and the Communist Party. London, UK: Routledge.
- Odom, W. E. (2000). The Collapse of the Soviet Military. New Haven: Yale University Press.
- Suvorov, V. Suvorov, V., & Hackett, J. (1987). Inside the Soviet Army. London: Grafton Books.
- Suvorov, V. (1989). Spetsnaz: The Story Behind the Soviet SAS. London: Grafton.

=== Dissolution of the Soviet Union and Bloc ===
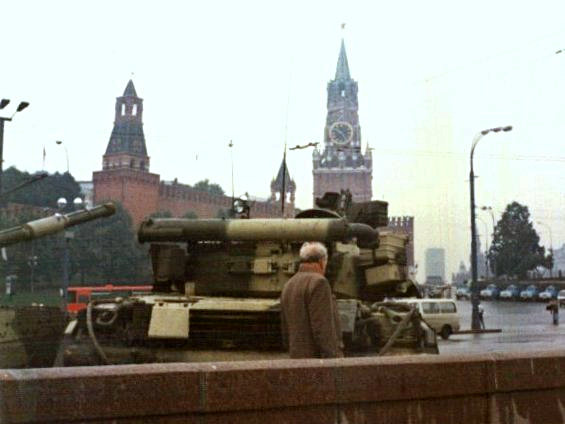
Tanks in Red Square during the 1991 August coup attempt

For works about the history of post-Soviet Russia, see Bibliography of Russian history (1991–present)

- Aleksievič, S., & Shayevich, B. (2017). Secondhand Time: The Last of the Soviets. New York: Random House.
- Allison, G. T., & Javlinskij, G. A. (1991). Window of Opportunity: The Grand Bargain for Democracy in the Soviet Union. New York: Pantheon Books.
- Baberowski, J., & Komljen, I. (2011). Criticism as Crisis, or Why the Soviet Union Still Collapsed. Journal of Modern European History, 9(2), 148–166.
- Beissinger, M. (2009). Nationalism and the Collapse of Soviet Communism. Contemporary European History, 18(3), 331–347.
- Gaidar, Yegor (2007). Collapse of an Empire: Lessons for Modern Russia. Translated by Antonina W. Bouis. Brookings Institution Press. ISBN 978-0815731146.
- De Stefano, C. (2022). Gorbachev's Nationalities Policy and the Negotiations over a New Union Treaty, 1987–91. The Russian Review, 81(2) 325–343.
- Gill, G. (2010). The Collapse of a Single-Party System: The Disintegration of the Communist Party of the Soviet Union (Cambridge Russian, Soviet and Post-Soviet Studies). Cambridge: Cambridge University Press.
- Graham, L. R. (1993). The Ghost of the Executed Engineer: Technology and the Fall of the Soviet Union. Cambridge, MA: Harvard University Press.
- Gompert, D. C., Binnendijk, H., & Lin, B. (2014). The Soviet Decision Not to Invade Poland, 1981. In Blinders, Blunders, and Wars: What America and China Can Learn (pp. 139–150). Rand Corporation.
- Griffiths, M. (2013). Moscow after the Apocalypse. Slavic Review, 72(3), 481–504.
- Kaiser, R. G. (1994). The Geography of Nationalism in Russia and the USSR. Princeton: Princeton University Press.
- Kostenko, Y., & D'Anieri, P. (2021). Ukraine's Nuclear Disarmament: A History (S. Krasynska, L. Wolanskyj, & O. Jennings, Trans.). Cambridge: Harvard Ukrainian Research Institute.
- Kotkin, S. (2001). Armageddon Averted: The Collapse of the Soviet Union. Oxford: Oxford University Press.
- Kramer, M. (2004). The Reform of the Soviet System and the Demise of the Soviet State. Slavic Review, 63(3), 505–512.
- ———. (2011). The Demise of the Soviet Bloc. Europe-Asia Studies, 63(9), 1535–1590.
- Lasas, A. (2007). Bloody Sunday: What Did Gorbachev Know About The January 1991 Events in Vilnius and Riga? Journal of Baltic Studies, 38(2), 179–194.
- Mastny, V. (1999). The Soviet Non-Invasion of Poland in 1980-1981 and the End of the Cold War. Europe-Asia Studies, 51(2), 189–211.
- Nahaylo, B., & Swoboda, V. (1990). Soviet Disunion: A History of the Nationalities Problem in the USSR. London: Hamilton.
- O'Clery, C. (2012). Moscow, December 25, 1991: The Last Day of the Soviet Union. New York: PublicAffairs.
- Petrov, K. (2008). Construction, Reconstruction, Deconstruction: The Fall of the Soviet Union from the Point of View of Conceptual History. Studies in East European Thought, 60(3), 179–205.
- Pleshakov, C. (2013). There is No Freedom Without Bread!: 1989 and the Civil War that Brought down Communism. New York: Farrar, Straus and Giroux.
- Plokhy, S. (2014). The Last Empire: The Final Days of the Soviet Union. New York: Basic Books.
- Pons, S. (2009). Western Communists, Mikhail Gorbachev and the 1989 Revolutions. Contemporary European History, 18(3), 349–362.
- Remnick, D. (1993). Lenin's Tomb: The Last Days of the Soviet Empire. New York: Random House.
- Sebestyen, V. (2009). Revolution 1989: The Fall of the Soviet Empire. New York: Pantheon Books.
- Suny, R. G. (2004). The Revenge of the Past: Nationalism, Revolution, and the Collapse of the Soviet Union. Palo Alto: Stanford University Press.
- Zubok, V. M. (2021). Collapse: The Fall of the Soviet Union. New Haven: Yale University Press.

=== The legacy of the Soviet Union ===
- Atai, F. (2012). Soviet Cultural Legacy in Tajikistan. Iranian Studies, 45(1), 81–95.
- Daniels, R. V. (1993). The End of the Communist Revolution. London, UK: Routledge.
- Spohr, K. (2020). Post Wall, Post Square: How Bush, Gorbachev, Kohl, and Deng Shaped the World after 1989. New Haven: Yale University Press.

== Soviet territories ==
- Beissinger, M., & Hajda, L. (Eds.). (1990). The Nationalities Factor in Soviet Politics and Society. Boulder, CO: Westview Press.
- Beissinger, M. (2006). Soviet Empire as "Family Resemblance. Slavic Review, 65(2), 294–303.
- Dobbs, M. (1997). Down with Big Brother: The Fall of the Soviet Empire. New York: Alfred A. Knopf.
- Dunlop, J. B. (1984). The Faces of Contemporary Russian Nationalism. Princeton: Princeton University Press.
- ———. (2011). The Rise of Russia and the Fall of the Soviet Empire. Princeton: Princeton University Press.
- Gleason, G., & Hazard, J. N. (2018). Federalism and Nationalism: The Struggle for Republican Rights in the USSR. London, UK: Routledge.
- Gorlizki, Y. (2010). Too Much Trust: Regional Party Leaders and Local Political Networks under Brezhnev. Slavic Review, 69(3), 676–700.
- Hajda, L., & Beissinger, M. (1990). The Nationalities Factor in Soviet Politics and Society. London: Routledge.
- Keep, J. (1995). Last of the Empires: A History of the USSR, 1945–1991. New York: Oxford University Press.
- Miller, C. (2021). We Shall Be Masters: Russian Pivots to East Asia from Peter the Great to Putin. Cambridge: Harvard University Press.
- Nahaylo, B., & Swoboda, V. (1990). Soviet Disunion: A History of the Nationalities Problem in the USSR. London, UK: Hamilton.
- Olcott, M. (1985). Yuri Andropov and the 'National Question'. Soviet Studies, 37(1), 103–117.
- Rigby, T. (1978). The Soviet Regional Leadership: The Brezhnev Generation. Slavic Review, 37(1), 1–24.
- Roeder, P. (1991). Soviet Federalism and Ethnic Mobilization. World Politics, 43(2), 196–232.
- Shanin, T. (1989). Ethnicity in the Soviet Union: Analytical Perceptions and Political Strategies. Comparative Studies in Society and History, 31(3), 409–424.
- Simm, G. (1991). Nationalism And Policy Toward The Nationalities In The Soviet Union: From Totalitarian Dictatorship To Post-stalinist Society. New York: Routledge.
- Weiner, A. (2006). The Empires Pay a Visit: Gulag Returnees, East European Rebellions, and Soviet Frontier Politics. The Journal of Modern History, 78(2), 333–376.

=== Baltics ===
- Prigge, W. (2004). The Latvian Purges of 1959: A Revision Study. Journal of Baltic Studies, 35(3), 211–230.

=== Byelorussia ===
- Exeler, F. (2022). Ghosts of War: Nazi Occupation and Its Aftermath in Soviet Belarus. Ithaca: Cornell University Press.
- Urban, M. (2009). An Algebra of Soviet Power: Elite Circulation in the Belorussian Republic 1966-86 (Cambridge Russian, Soviet and Post-Soviet Studies). Cambridge: Cambridge University Press.

=== Caucasus ===
- Under construction

=== Central Asia ===
- Keller, S. (2020). Russia and Central Asia: Coexistence, Conquest, Convergence. Toronto: University of Toronto Press.
- Khalid, A. (2021). Central Asia: A New History from the Imperial Conquests to the Present. Princeton: Princeton University Press.
- Reeves, M. (2022). Infrastructures of Empire in Central Asia. Kritika: Explorations in Russian and Eurasian History, 23(2), 364–370.
- Rywkin, M. (2015). Moscow's Muslim Challenge: Soviet Central Asia. New York: Routledge.
- Stronski, P. (2010). Tashkent: Forging a Soviet City, 1930–1966. Pittsburgh, PA: University of Pittsburgh Press.

=== Ukraine ===
- Kuromiya, H. (2002). Freedom and Terror in the Donbas: A Ukrainian-Russian Borderland, 1870s-1990s. Cambridge: Cambridge University Press.
- Wojnowski, Z. (2012). De-Stalinization and Soviet Patriotism: Ukrainian Reactions to East European Unrest in 1956. Kritika: Explorations in Russian and Eurasian History. 13(4), 799–829.

== Ideology and propaganda ==
- Benn, D. (1969). New Thinking in Soviet Propaganda. Soviet Studies, 21(1), 52–63.
- ———. (1985). Soviet Propaganda: The Theory and the Practice. The World Today, 41(6), 112–115.
- Brunstedt, J. (2021). The Soviet Myth of World War II: Patriotic Memory and the Russian Question in the USSR (Studies in the Social and Cultural History of Modern Warfare). New York: Cambridge University Press.
- Eberstadt, N. (1988). The Poverty of Communism. London: Routledge.
- Ebon, M. (1987). The Soviet Propaganda Machine. New York: McGraw-Hill.
- Fainberg, D. (2020). Cold War Correspondents: Soviet and American Reporters on the Ideological Frontlines'. Baltimore: Johns Hopkins University Press.
- Fürst, J., Pons, S., & Selden, M. (Eds.). (2017). The Cambridge History of Communism: Volume 3, Endgames? Late Communism in Global Perspective, 1968 to the Present. Cambridge, UK: Cambridge University Press. (Note: The notes at the end of each essay (chapter) includes substantial bibliographic entries.)
- Hixson, W. L. (1998). Parting the Curtain: Propaganda, Culture, and the Cold War, 1945-1961. New York: Macmillan.
- Mitchell, R. (1972). The Brezhnev Doctrine and Communist Ideology. The Review of Politics, 34(2), 190–209.
- Nagorski, Z. (1971). Soviet International Propaganda: Its Role, Effectiveness, and Future. The Annals of the American Academy of Political and Social Science, 398, 130–139.

== Economy ==
- Allen, R. (2001). The Rise and Decline of the Soviet Economy. The Canadian Journal of Economics / Revue Canadienne D'Economique, 34(4), 859–881.
- Evans, A. (1977). Developed Socialism in Soviet Ideology. Soviet Studies, 29(3), 409–428.
- Gatrell, P. and Lewis, R. (1992). Russian and Soviet Economic History. The Economic History Review, 45(4), pp. 743–754.
- Gidadhubli, R. (1983). Andropov on Soviet Economy after Brezhnev. Economic and Political Weekly, 18(4), 103–104.
- Goldman, M. I. (1983). U.S.S.R. in Crisis: The Failure of an Economic System. New York: Norton.
- Hanson, P. (2003). The Rise and Fall of the Soviet Economy: An Economic History of the USSR from 1945. London, UK: Longman.
- Hewett, E. A. (1988). Reforming the Soviet Economy: Equality versus Efficiency. Washington, DC: Brookings Institution.
- Hoffmann, E. P., & Laird, R. F. (1982). The Politics of Economic Modernization in the Soviet Union. Ithaca, N.Y: Cornell University Press.
- Marrese, M., & Vaňous, J. (1983). Soviet Subsidization of Trade with Eastern Europe: A Soviet Perspective. Berkeley, CA : Institute of International Studies, University of California Press.
- Miller, C. (2016). The Struggle to Save the Soviet Economy: Mikhail Gorbachev and the Collapse of the USSR. Chapel Hill: University of North Carolina Press.
- Millar, J. R., & Linz, S. J. (1990). The Soviet Economic Experiment. Urbana: University of Illinois Press.
- Rowen, H. S., & Wolf, C. J. (1990). The Impoverished Superpower: Perestroika and the Burden of Soviet Military Spending. San Francisco: ICS Press.
- Rutland, P. (2010). The Politics of Economic Stagnation in the Soviet Union: The Role of Local Party Organs in Economic Management (Cambridge Russian, Soviet and Post-Soviet Studies). Cambridge: Cambridge University Press.
- Shmelev, N., & Popov, V. (1989). The Turning Point: Revitalizing the Soviet Economy. London, UK: Tauris.
- Simis, K. (1982). USSR: The Corrupt Society: The Secret World of Soviet Capitalism. New York: Simon & Schuster.
- Suri, J. (2006). The Promise and Failure of 'Developed Socialism': The Soviet 'Thaw' and the Crucible of the Prague Spring, 1964-1972. Contemporary European History, 15(2), 133–158.
- Zweynert, J. (2014). 'Developed Socialism' and Soviet Economic Thought in the 1970s and Early '80s. Russian History, 41(3), 354–372.

== External relations ==
=== The Soviet Bloc in Europe ===
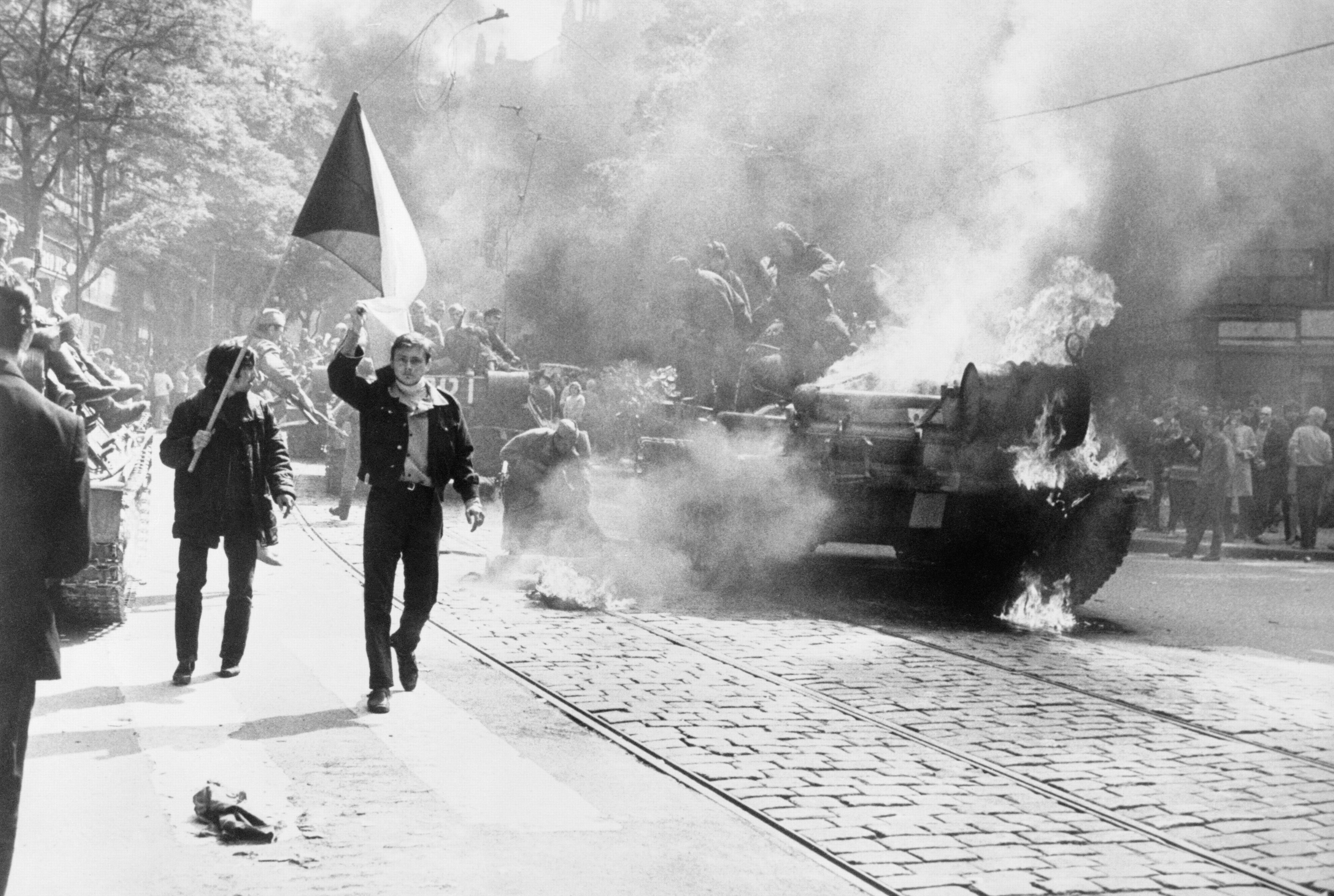
Soviet Invasion of Czechoslovakia

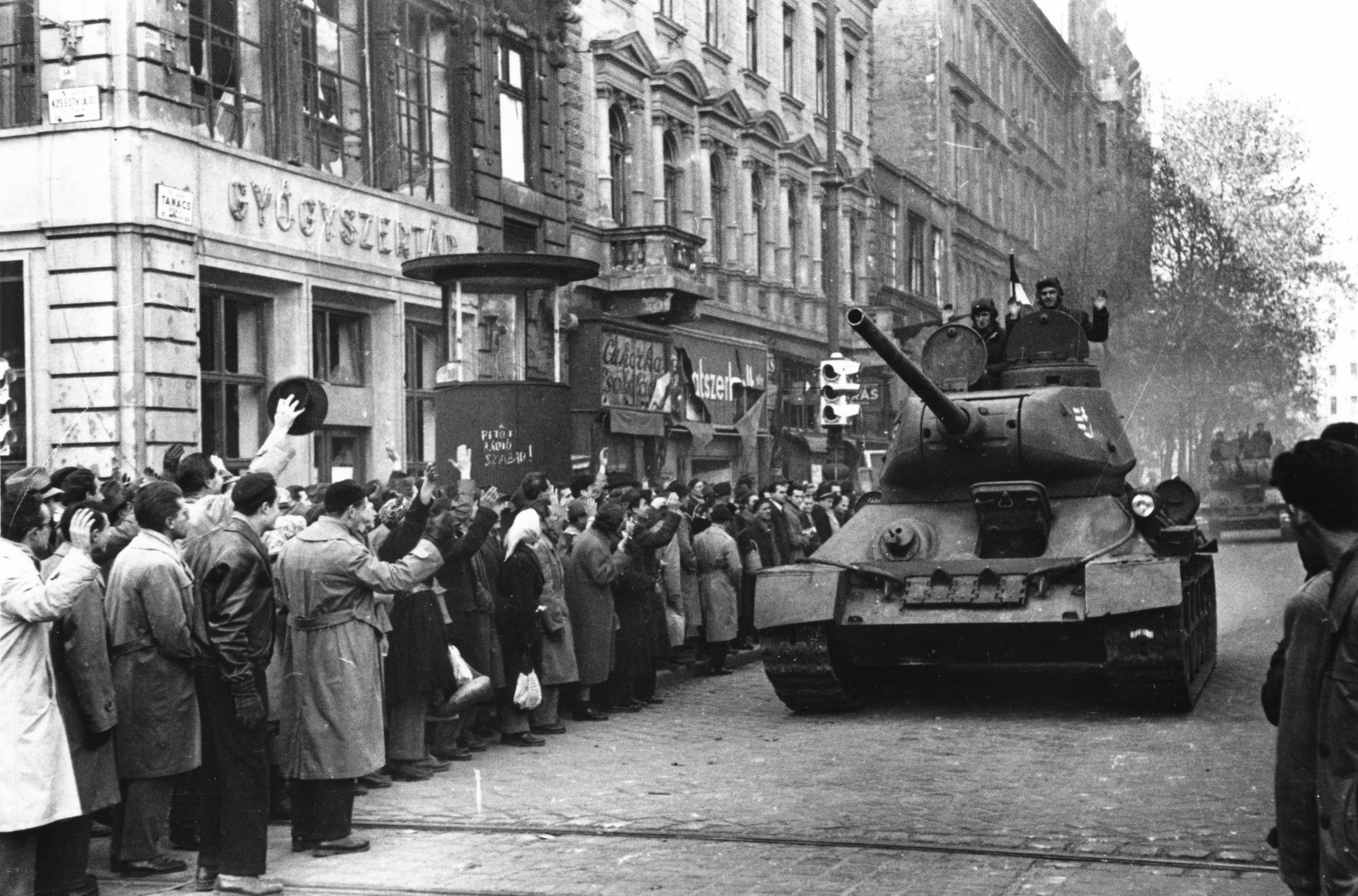
Crowd cheers Hungarian troops in Budapest

- Archard, L. (2018). Hungarian Uprising: Budapest's Cataclysmic Twelve Days, 1956. Barnsley, UK: Pen and Sword Military.
- Baring, A. (1972). Uprising in East Germany. Ithaca: Cornell University Press.
- Brzezinski, Z. K. (1960). The Soviet Bloc: Unity and Conflict. Cambridge, MA: Harvard University Press.
- Corda, M. (2007). Journey to a Revolution: A Personal Memoir and History of the Hungarian Revolution of 1956. New York: Harper Perennial.
- David-Fox, M. (Ed.). (2023). The secret police and the Soviet system: New archival investigations. University of Pittsburgh Press.
- Dawisha, K. (1984). The Kremlin and the Prague Spring. Berkeley: University of California Press.
- Eörsi, L. (2006). The Hungarian Revolution of 1956: Myths and Realities. Boulder, CO: Social Science Monographs.
- Fehér, F., & Heller, A. (1983). Hungary 1956 Revisited: The Message of a Revolution - A Quarter of a Century After. London, UK: Allen and Unwin.
- Gati, C. (1986). Hungary and the Soviet Bloc. Durham: Duke University Press.
- ———. (1990). The Bloc that Failed: Soviet-East European Relations in Transition. Bloomington: Indiana University Press.
- ———. (2006). Failed Illusions: Moscow, Washington, Budapest, and the 1956 Hungarian Revolt. Palo Alto: Stanford University Press.
- Ginsburgs, G. (1960). Demise and Revival of a Communist Party: An Autopsy of the Hungarian Revolution. The Western Political Quarterly, 13(3), 780–802.
- Granville, J. (2003). Reactions to the Events of 1956: New Findings from the Budapest and Warsaw Archives. Journal of Contemporary History, 38(2), 261–290.
- ———, & Garthoff, R. L. (2004). The First Domino: International Decision Making during the Hungarian Crisis of 1956. College Station: Texas A&M University Press.
- Gyáni, G. (2006). Memory and Discourse on the 1956 Hungarian Revolution. Europe-Asia Studies, 58(8), 1199–1208.
- Györkei, J. D., & Horváth, M. (1999). Soviet Military Intervention in Hungary, 1956. New York: Central European University Press.
- Lendvai, P., & Major, A. (2008). One Day that Shook the Communist World: The 1956 Hungarian Uprising and Its Legacy. Princeton: Princeton University Press.
- Lévesque, J. (1997). The Enigma of 1989: The USSR and the Liberation of Eastern Europe. Berkeley: University of California Press.
- Litván, G., Bak, J. M., & Legters, L. H. (1996). The Hungarian Revolution of 1956: Reform, Revolt and Repression 1953-1963. London, UK: Longman.
- Mastny, V. (1999). The Soviet Non-Invasion of Poland in 1980-1981 and the End of the Cold War. Europe-Asia Studies, 51(2), 189–211.
- Matthews, J. P. C. (2007). Explosion: The Hungarian Revolution of 1956. New York: Hippocrene Books.
- Michener, J. A. (1984). The Bridge at Andau: The Compelling True Story of a Brave, Embattled People. New York: Corgi/Penguin Books.
- Miller, R. F., & Féhér, F. (1984). Khrushchev and the Communist World. London, UK: Croom Helm.
- Millington, R. (2014). State, Society and Memories of the Uprising of 17 June 1953 in the GDR. New York: Palgrave Macmillan.
- Mlynár, Z. (1986). Nightfrost in Prague: The End of Humane Socialism. London: C. Hurst.
- Moorthy, K. K. (1971). Tito and Brezhnev: Outward Cementing?. Economic and Political Weekly, 6(44), 2233–2233.
- Narayanswamy, R. (1989). Eastern Europe: Divided over Perestroika. Economic and Political Weekly, 24(4), 186–188.
- Ostermann, C. F., & Byrne, M. (2001). Uprising in East Germany 1953: The Cold War, the German Question, and the First Major Upheaval Behind the Iron Curtain. Budapest: Central European University Press.
- Persak, K. (2006). The Polish: Soviet Confrontation in 1956 and the Attempted Soviet Military Intervention in Poland. Europe-Asia Studies, 58(8), 1285–1310.
- Péter, L. (2008). Resistance, Rebellion and Revolution in Hungary and Central Europe: Commemorating 1956. London: Hungarian Cultural Centre, University of Central London.
- Pók, A. (1998). 1956 Revisited. Contemporary European History, 7(2), 263–270.
- Pucci, M. (2020). Security empire: The secret police in communist Eastern Europe. Yale University Press.
- Richter, J. (1993). Re-Examining Soviet Policy towards Germany in 1953. Europe-Asia Studies, 45(4), 671–691.
- Sebestyen, V. (2006). Twelve Days: The Story of the 1956 Hungarian Revolution. New York: Vintage Books.
- Stanciu, C. (2014). Autonomy and Ideology: Brezhnev, Ceauşescu and the World Communist Movement. Contemporary European History, 23(1), 115–134.
- Stoneman, A. (2015). Socialism With a Human Face: The Leadership and Legacy of the Prague Spring. The History Teacher, 49(1), 103–125.
- Valenta, J., & Dubček, A. (1991). Soviet Intervention in Czechoslovakia, 1968: Anatomy of a Decision. Baltimore, MD: Johns Hopkins University. Press.
- Westad, O. A., Holtsmark, S. G., & Neumann, I. B. (1994). The Soviet Union in Eastern Europe, 1945-89. New York: St. Martin's Press.
- Williams, K. (1996). New Sources on Soviet Decision Making during the 1968 Czechoslovak Crisis. Europe-Asia Studies, 48(3), 457–470.
- Windsor, P., & Roberts, A. (1969). Czechoslovakia 1968: Reform, Repression and Resistance. New York: Columbia University Press.

=== Foreign policy and relations ===
- Anderson, R. D. (1993). Public Politics in an Authoritarian State: Making Foreign Policy During the Brezhnev Years. Washington DC: NCROL.
- Baroch, C. (1971). The Brezhnev Doctrine. American Bar Association Journal, 57(7), 686–690.
- Burke, J. (1993). Gorbachev's Eurasian Strategy. World Affairs, 155(4), 156–168.
- Du Quenoy, P. (2003). The Role of Foreign Affairs in the Fall of Nikita Khrushchev in October 1964. The International History Review, 25(2), 334–356.
- Edmonds, R. (1983). Soviet Foreign Policy: The Brezhnev Era. Cambridge, UK: Oxford University Press.
- Gittings, J. (1968). Survey of the Sino-Soviet Dispute, 1963-1967. London, UK: Royal Institute of International Affairs.
- Garthoff, R. L. (1994). Détente and Confrontation: American-Soviet Relations from Nixon to Reagan. Washington, D.C: Brookings Institution Press.
- Grachev, A. (2013). Gorbachev's Gamble: Soviet Foreign Policy and the End of the Cold War. Oxford: Wiley Press.
- Griffith, W. E. (1964). The Sino-Soviet Rift. Cambridge, MA: MIT Press.
- Haykal, M. Ḥasanayn. (1978). The Sphinx and the Commissar: The Rise and Fall of Soviet Influence in the Middle East. New York: Harper & Row.
- Johnson, E. (2001). Nikita Khrushchev, Andrei Voznesensky, and the Cold Spring of 1963: Documenting the End of the Post-Stalin Thaw. World Literature Today, 75(1), 30–39.
- Kharlamov, M., & Ajubei, A., & Vadeyev, O. (1960). Face to Face with America: The Story of N.S. Khrushchov's Visit to the U.S.A. September 15–27, 1959. Moscow: Foreign Languages Publishing House.
- Klinghoffer, A. (1986). US-Soviet Relations and Angola. Harvard International Review, 8(3), 15–19.
- Li, D., & Xia, Y. (2018). Mao and the Sino-Soviet Split, 1959-1973. Lanham, MD: Lexington Books.
- Lynch, A. (2011). The Soviet Study of International Relations (Cambridge Russian, Soviet and Post-Soviet Studies). Cambridge: Cambridge University Press.
- Lyne, R. (1987). Making Waves: Gorbachev's Public Diplomacy, 1985-86. Proceedings of the Academy of Political Science, 36(4), 235–253.
- Mehrotra, S. (2010). India and the Soviet Union: Trade and Technology Transfer (Cambridge Russian, Soviet and Post-Soviet Studies). Cambridge: Cambridge University Press.
- Papp, D. (1995). Soviet Foreign Policy and Domestic Politics. Mershon International Studies Review, 39(2), 290–293.
- Patman, R. (2010). The Soviet Union in the Horn of Africa: The Diplomacy of Intervention and Disengagement (Cambridge Russian, Soviet and Post-Soviet Studies). Cambridge: Cambridge University Press.
- Pavlov, Y. I. (1994). Soviet-Cuban Alliance 1959-1991. New Brunswick: Transaction Publishers.
- Pittman, A. (2009). From Ostpolitik to Reunification: West German-Soviet Political Relations since 1974 (Cambridge Russian, Soviet and Post-Soviet Studies). Cambridge: Cambridge University Press.
- Prizel, I. (2012). Latin America through Soviet Eyes: The Evolution of Soviet Perceptions during the Brezhnev Era 1964-1982 (Cambridge Russian, Soviet and Post-Soviet Studies). Cambridge: Cambridge University Press.
- Racioppi, L. (2009). Soviet Policy towards South Asia since 1970 (Cambridge Russian, Soviet and Post-Soviet Studies). Cambridge: Cambridge University Press.
- Rea, K. (1975). Peking and the Brezhnev Doctrine. Asian Affairs, 3(1), 22–30.
- Roberts, G. K. (2008). The Soviet Union in World Politics: Coexistence, Revolution and Cold War, 1945-1991. London: Routledge.
- Stent, A. (2010). From Embargo to Ostpolitik: The Political Economy of West German-Soviet Relations, 1955-1980 (Cambridge Russian, Soviet and Post-Soviet Studies). Cambridge: Cambridge University Press.
- Thornton, R. C. (1985). Soviet Asian Strategy in the Brezhnev Era and Beyond. Washington, DC: Washington Institute for Values in Public Policy.
- Ulam, A. B. (1974). Expansion and Coexistence: Soviet Foreign Policy, 1917-73. New York: Praeger.
- ———. (1983). Dangerous Relations: The Soviet Union in World Politics, 1970-1982. New York: Oxford University Press.
- Wehling, F. (1997). Irresolute Princes: Kremlin Decision Making in Middle East Crises, 1967-1973. New York: Macmillan.
- Westad, O. A. (2011). Brothers in Arms: The Rise and Fall of the Sino-Soviet Alliance, 1945–1963. Washington, DC: Woodrow Wilson Center Press.

=== The Cold War ===
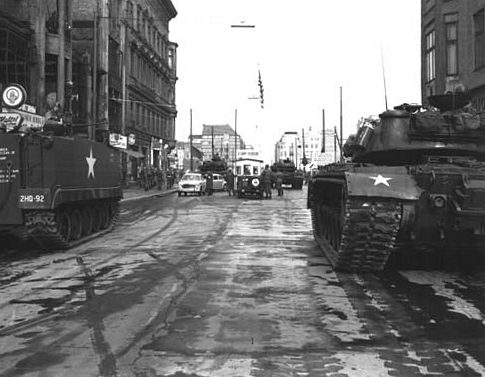
Checkpoint Charlie, October 27, 1961

- Barrass, G. S. (2009). The Great Cold War: A Journey through the Hall of Mirrors. Palo Alto: Stanford University Press.
- Beschloss, M. R. (1986). Mayday: Eisenhower, Khrushchev and the U-2 Affair. New York: Harper & Row.
- Beschloss, M. R., & Talbott, S. (1994). At the Highest Levels: The Inside Story of the End of the Cold War. Boston, MA: Little, Brown.
- Blanton, T., & Savranskaya, S. (2011). Looking Back: Reykjavik: When Abolition Was Within Reach. Arms Control Today, 41(8), 46–51.
- Brown, A. (2020). The Human Factor: Gorbachev, Reagan, and Thatcher, and the End of the Cold War. Cambridge, UK: Oxford University Press.
- Brugioni, D. A., & McCort, R. F. (1991). Eyeball to Eyeball: The Inside Story of the Cuban Missile Crisis. New York: Random House.
- Brun, E., & Hersh, J. (1978). Paradoxes in the Political Economy of Détente. Theory and Society, 5(3), 295–344.
- English, R. (2000). Russia and the Idea of the West: Gorbachev, Intellectuals, and the End of the Cold War. New York: Columbia University Press.
- Farnham, B. (2001). Reagan and the Gorbachev Revolution: Perceiving the End of Threat. Political Science Quarterly, 116(2), 225–252.
- Fursenko, A. A., & Naftali, T. J. (1997). One Hell of a Gamble: Khrushchev, Castro and Kennedy, 1958-1964. New York: Norton.
- –––, & ———. (2006). Khrushchev's Cold War: The Inside Story of an American Adversary. New York: Norton.
- Gaddis, J. L. (1998). We Now Know: Rethinking Cold War History. Oxford, UK: Clarendon Press.
- ———. (2007). The Cold War: A New History. New York: Penguin Books.
- Garthoff, R. L. (2007). Reflections on the Cuban Missile Crisis. Washington, DC: Brookings Institution Press.
- Gelman, H. (1984). The Brezhnev Politburo and the Decline of Détente. Ithaca: Cornell University Press.
- Gribkov, A. I., Smith, W. Y., & Friendly, A. (1994). Operation ANADYR: U.S. and Soviet Generals Recount the Cuban Missile Crisis. Chicago: Edition Q.
- Hoffman, D. E. (2009). The Dead Hand: The Untold Story of the Cold War Arms Race and its Dangerous Legacy. New York: Doubleday.
- Kempe, F. (2011). Berlin 1961: Kennedy, Khruschev, and the Most Dangerous Place on Earth. New York: G.P. Putnam's Sons.
- Lebow, R., Mueller, J., & Wohlforth, W. (1995). Realism and the End of the Cold War. International Security, 20(2), 185–187.
- Liebich, A. (1995). Mensheviks Wage the Cold War. Journal of Contemporary History, 30(2), 247–264.
- MacGregor, I. (2019). Checkpoint Charlie: The Cold War, The Berlin Wall, and the Most Dangerous Place On Earth. New York: Scribner.
- Miles, S. (2020). Engaging the Evil Empire: Washington, Moscow, and the Beginning of the End of the Cold War'. Ithaca: Cornell University Press.
- Miller, D. (2012). The Cold War: A Military History. London, UK: Pimlico.
- Nash, P. (1997). The Other Missiles of October: Eisenhower, Kennedy, and the Jupiters, 1957-1963. Chapel Hill: University of California Press.
- Nelson, K. L. (1995). The Making of Détente: Soviet-American Relations in the Shadow of Vietnam. Baltimore, MD: Johns Hopkins University Press.
- Patman, R. (1999). Reagan, Gorbachev and the Emergence of 'New Political Thinking'. Review of International Studies, 25(4), 577–601.
- Schrag, P. G. (1992). Global Action: Nuclear Test Ban Diplomacy at the End of the Cold War. New York: Routledge.
- Schwebel, S. (1972). The Brezhnev Doctrine Repealed and Peaceful Co-Existence Enacted. The American Journal of International Law, 66(5), 816–819.
- Seaborg, G. T., Loeb, B. S., & Harriman, W. A. (1983). Kennedy, Khrushchev and the Test Ban. Berkeley: University of California Press.
- Taylor, F. (2006). The Berlin Wall: A World Divided, 1961-1989. New York: Bloomsbury Publishing.
- Thompson, N. (2011). Nuclear War and Nuclear Fear in the 1970s and 1980s. Journal of Contemporary History, 46(1), 136–149.
- Watry, D. M. (2014). Diplomacy at the Brink: Eisenhower, Churchill, and Eden in the Cold War. Baton Rouge, LA: Louisiana State University Press.
- Westad, O. A. (1992). Rethinking Revolutions: The Cold War in the Third World. Journal of Peace Research, 29(4), 455–464.
- ———. (2016). The Global Cold War: Third World Interventions and the Making of Our Times. Cambridge: Cambridge University Press.
- ———. (2019). The Cold War: A World History. New York: Basic Books.
- Zubok, V. M. (2007). A Failed Empire: The Soviet Union in the Cold War from Stalin to Gorbachev. Chapel Hill: The University of North Carolina Press.

=== Afghanistan ===
- Braithwaite, R. (2011). Afgantsy: The Russians in Afghanistan 1979-89. New York: Oxford University Press.
- Collins, J. (1980). The Soviet Invasion of Afghanistan: Methods, Motives, And Ramifications. Naval War College Review, 33(6), 53–62.
- ———. (1987). Soviet Policy toward Afghanistan. Proceedings of the Academy of Political Science, 36(4), 198–210.
- Dunbar, C. (1988). Afghanistan in 1987: A Year of Decision? Asian Survey, 28(2), 148–162.
- Feifer, G. (2014). The Great Gamble: The Soviet War in Afghanistan. New York: HarperCollins.
- Fremont-Barnes, G. (2012). The Soviet–Afghan War 1979–89. Oxford, UK: Osprey Publishing.
- Goldman, M. (1984). Soviet Military Intervention in Afghanistan: Roots & Causes. Polity, 16(3), 384–403.
- Grau, L. W., & Gress, M. A. (2002). The Soviet-Afghan War: How A Superpower Fought and Lost. Lawrence, KS: University Press of Kansas.
- Kalinovsky, A. M. (2011). A Long Goodbye: The Soviet Withdrawal from Afghanistan. Cambridge, MA: Harvard University Press.
- Maley, W. (2009). The Afghanistan Wars. New York: Palgrave Macmillan.
- Reuveny, R., & Prakash, A. (1999). The Afghanistan War and the Breakdown of the Soviet Union. Review of International Studies, 25(4), 693–708.

== Other studies ==
- Aronova, E. (2021). Scientific History: Experiments in History and Politics from the Bolshevik Revolution to the End of the Cold War'. Chicago: University of Chicago Press.
- Bennigsen, A., & Broxup, M. (1983). The Islamic Threat to the Soviet State. New York: Routledge.
- Bruno, A. (2022). Atomic Visitors from Outer Space: The Tunguska Nuclear Hypothesis in Soviet Technological Imagination. The Russian Review, 81(1) 92–109.
- Cohen, S. F. (2011). Soviet Fates and Lost Alternatives: From Stalinism to the New Cold War. New York: Columbia University Press.
- Erley, M. (2021). On Russian Soil: Myth and Materiality. DeKalb: Northern Illinois University Press.
- Fortescue, S. (1990). Science Policy in the Soviet Union. London: Routledge.
- Hartley, J. M. (2021). The Volga: A History. New Haven: Yale University Press.
- Josephson, P. R. (1997). New Atlantis Revisited: Akademgorodok, the Siberian City of Science. Princeton: Princeton University Press.
- Suny, R. G. (1998). The Soviet Experiment: Russia, the USSR and the Successor States (2nd Edition). Cambridge, UK: Oxford University Press.
- Walker, G. (2011). Soviet Book Publishing Policy (Cambridge Russian, Soviet and Post-Soviet Studies). Cambridge: Cambridge University Press.

== Historiography ==
- Boyer, J., Kirshner, J., Iurii Nikolaevich Afanas'ev, Barg, M., Cherniak, E., Danilov, V., Volobuev, P. (1990). Perestroika, History, and Historians. The Journal of Modern History, 62(4), 782–830.
- Enteen, G. (2002). Recent Writings about Soviet Historiography. Slavic Review, 61(2), 357–363.
- Feest, D., & Hein-Kircher, H. (2017). Introduction: National Minorities in the Soviet Bloc after 1945: New Historical Research in Micro and Regional Studies. Region, 6(1), 1–10.
- Kenney, P. (2011). What's New, We Knew: Twentieth-Anniversary Appraisals of 1989. Diplomatic History, 35(3), 571–578.
- Krylova, A. (2014). Soviet Modernity: Stephen Kotkin and the Bolshevik Predicament. Contemporary European History, 23(2), 167–192.
- Magnúsdóttir, R. (2020). The Lives and Times of Leonid Brezhnev and Mikhail Gorbachev. Kritika: Explorations in Russian and Eurasian History, 21(1), 207–217
- Markwick, R. (2006). Cultural History under Khrushchev and Brezhnev: From Social Psychology to Mentalités. The Russian Review, 65(2), 283–301.
- Penter, T. (2005). Collaboration on Trial: New Source Material on Soviet Postwar Trials against Collaborators. Slavic Review, 64(4), 782–790.
- Ruivo, R. (2020). The Historiographical Invention of the Soviet Avant-Garde: Cultural Politics and the Return of the Lost Project. In S. Loosen, R. Heynickx, & H. Heynen (Eds.), The Figure of Knowledge: Conditioning Architectural Theory, 1960s - 1990s (pp. 227–242). Leuven University Press.
- Siegelbaum, L. (1995). Robert V. Daniels and the Longue Duree of Soviet History. The Russian Review, 54(3), 330–340.
- Siegelbaum, L. H. (2006). The Late Romance of the Soviet Worker in Western Historiography. International Review of Social History, 51(3), 463–481. * Viola, L. (2002). The Cold War in American Soviet Historiography and the End of the Soviet Union. The Russian Review, 61(1), 25–34.
- Siegelbaum, L. H. (2012). Whither Soviet History?: Some Reflections on Recent Anglophone Historiography. Region, 1(2), 213–230.
- Wolff, L. (2006). Revising Eastern Europe: Memory and the Nation in Recent Historiography. The Journal of Modern History, 78(1), 93–118.
- Yanow, D., & Schwartz-Shea, P. (2010). Perestroika Ten Years After: Reflections on Methodological Diversity. Political Science and Politics, 43(4), 741–745.
- Yaresh, L. (1957). The "Peasant Wars" in Soviet Historiography. American Slavic and East European Review, 16(3), 241–259.
- Zelikow, P. (2009). The Suicide of the East? 1989 and the Fall of Communism. Foreign Affairs, 886), 130–140.

=== Memory studies ===
- Brunstedt, J. (2021). The Soviet Myth of World War II: Patriotic Memory and the Russian Question in the USSR (Studies in the Social and Cultural History of Modern Warfare). New York: Cambridge University Press.
- Friedla, K., & Nesselrodt, M. (Eds.). (2021). Polish Jews in the Soviet Union (1939–1959): History and Memory of Deportation, Exile, and Survival. Academic Studies Press.
- Penter, T. (2013). Coming to Terms with a Violent Past. Kritika: Explorations in Russian and Eurasian History. 14(3), 683–690.
- Smith, M. B. (2022). Equality, Welfare, Myth, and Memory: The Artek Pioneer Camp at the Height of the Khrushchev Era. Kritika: Explorations in Russian and Eurasian History, 23(2), pp. 255–287.
- Smith, T. J. (1998). The Collapse of the Lenin Personality Cult in Soviet Russia, 1985-1995. The Historian, 60(2), 325–343.

=== Identity studies ===
- Donovan, V. (2019). Chronicles in Stone: Preservation, Patriotism, and Identity in Northwest Russia (Illustrated edition) (NIU Series in Slavic, East European, and Eurasian Studies). DeKalb: Northern Illinois University Press.

== Biographies ==
- Aron, L. R. (2001). Boris Yeltsin: A Revolutionary Life. London: HarperCollins.
- Breslauer, G. W. (2002). Gorbachev and Yeltsin as leaders. Cambridge University Press. doi:10.1017/cbo9780511613531
- Brown, A. (1996). The Gorbachev Factor. Cambridge, UK: Oxford University Press.
- Crankshaw, E. (1966). Khrushchev: A Career. New York: Viking Press.
- Jenks, A. L. (2019). The Cosmonaut Who Couldn't Stop Smiling: The Life and Legend of Yuri Gagarin (NIU Series in Slavic, East European, and Eurasian Studies). DeKalb: Northern Illinois University Press.
- Medvedev, R. A., & Medvedev, Z. A. (1977). Khrushchev. London: Oxford University Press.
- Medvedev, Z. A. (1984). Andropov: His Life and Death. Oxford, UK: Blackwell.
- Murphy, P. J. (1981). Brezhnev, Soviet Politician. Jefferson: McFarland.
- Paloczi-Horvath, G. (1960). Khrushchev: The Making of a Dictator. Boston, MA: Little, Brown.
- Ruge, G. (1991). Gorbachev: A Biography. London: Chatto & Windus.
- Scammell, M. (1984). Solzhenitsyn: A Biography. New York: W. W. Norton & Co.
- Sheehy, G. (1991). The Man Who Changed the World: The lives of Mikhail S. Gorbachev. New York: HarperPerennial.
- Sullivan, R. (2015). Stalin's Daughter: The Extraordinary and Tumultuous Life of Svetlana Alliluyeva (Illustrated edition). New York: HarperCollins.
- Taubman, W. (2003). Khrushchev: The Man and His Era. New York: W. W. Norton & Company.
- Taubman, W. (2017). Gorbachev: His Life and Times. New York: W. W. Norton & Company.

== Reference works ==
- The Cambridge Encyclopedia of Russia and the former Soviet Union. (1994). Cambridge, UK: Cambridge University Press.
- Kasack, W. & Atack, R. (1988). Dictionary of Russian literature since 1917. New York: Columbia University Press.
- Minahan, J. (2012). The Former Soviet Union's Diverse Peoples: A Reference Sourcebook. Santa Barbara: ABC-CLIO.
- Smith, S. A. (2014). The Oxford Handbook of the History of Communism. New York: Oxford University Press.
- Vronskaya, J. & Čuguev, V. (1992). The Biographical Dictionary of the Former Soviet Union: Prominent people in all fields from 1917 to the present. London, UK: Bowker-Saur.

== Memoirs and literary accounts ==
- Aleksievič, S. A., Whitby, J., & Whitby, R. (2015). Zinky Boys: Soviet Voices from the Afghanistan War. New York: W. W. Norton.
- Borovik, A. (2008). The Hidden War: A Russian Journalist's Account of the Soviet War in Afghanistan. New York: Grove Press.
- Brezhnev, L. (1978–79). Brezhnev's trilogy (3 vols. The Minor Land, Rebirth, & Virgin Lands). Moscow: Progress Publishers. (Note: Authorship is highly disputed and it is highly doubtful that Brezhnev was the actual author.)
- Dobrynin, A. F. (1995). In Confidence: Moscow's Ambassador to America's Six Cold War Presidents (1962-1986). New York: Random House.
- Gandlevsky, S. (2014). Trepanation of the Skull (1st edition; S. Fusso, Trans.). DeKalb: Northern Illinois University Press.
- Gorbachev, M. S. (1996). Mikhail Gorbachev: Memoirs. London, UK: Doubleday.
- Khrushchev, N. S., Crankshaw, E., & Talbott, S. (1971). Khrushchev Remembers. Boston, MA: Little, Brown and Co.
- ———., & Talbott, S. (1974). Khrushchev Remembers: The Last Testament. Boston, MA: Little, Brown and Co.
- ———., Talbott, S., Schecter, J. L., & Luchkov, V. V. (1990). Khrushchev Remembers: The Glasnost Tapes. Boston, MA: Little, Brown.
- Khrushchev, S. (2003). Nikita Khrushchev and the Creation of a Superpower. University Park, PA: Pennsylvania State University Press. (Note: Memoir written by Sergei Khruschev about his father.)
- MacDuffie, M. (1955). The Red Carpet: 10,000 miles through Russia on a Visa from Khrushchev. New York: Norton.
- Molotov, V. M., Čuev, F., & Resis, A. (2007). Molotov Remembers: Inside Kremlin Politics: Conversations with Felix Čhuev. Chicago: Ivan R. Dee.
- Solzhenitsyn, A. I. (1991). The Oak and the Calf: Sketches of Literary Life in the Soviet Union: A Memoir. London, UK: Collins-Harvill.
- Vidali, V. (1984). Diary of the Twentieth Congress of the Communist Party of the Soviet Union. Westport: Lawrence Hill.

== English language translations of primary sources ==
- Documents related to Soviet-US Relations (Document Collection). The Wilson Center Digital Archive.
- Documents related to Soviet Foreign Relations (Document Collection). The Wilson Center Digital Archive.
- Documents related to Soviet - North Korean Relations (Document Collection). The Wilson Center Digital Archive.
- Documents related to Sino-Soviet Relations (Document Collection). The Wilson Center Digital Archive.
- Documents related to Soviet Nuclear History (Document Collection). The Wilson Center Digital Archive.
- The Berlin Wall (Document Collection). The Wilson Center Digital Archive. (Note: Documents from the immediate post-war period through the construction of the Wall and its eventual destruction.)

=== The Khrushchev Era (1953–1964) ===
Collections

- The Sino-Soviet Alliance, 1950-1959 (Document Collection). The Wilson Center Digital Archive.
- 1953 Post-Stalin Succession Struggle (Document Collection). The Wilson Center Digital Archive.
- 1953 East German Uprising (Document Collection). The Wilson Center Digital Archive.
- 1956 Polish and Hungarian Crises (Document Collection). The Wilson Center Digital Archive.
- The Sino-Soviet Split, 1960-1984 (Document Collection). The Wilson Center Digital Archive.
- 1962 Cuban Missile Crisis (Document Collection). The Wilson Center Digital Archive.
- Documents Related to Nikita Khrushchev (Document Collection). The Wilson Center Digital Archive.
- Chang, L., & Kornbluh, P. (Eds.). (1999). The Cuban Missile Crisis, 1962: A National Security Archive Documents Reader. New York: The New Press.
- Dallin, A., Harris, J., & Hodnett, G. (Eds.). (1963). Diversity in International Communism: A Documentary Record, 1961-1963. New York: Columbia University Press.
- Hodnett, G., & McNeal, R. H. (Eds.). (1974). Resolutions and Decisions of the Communist Party of the Soviet Union: Vol. 4 Khrushchev Years, 1953-1964. Toronto, ON: Toronto University of Toronto Press.
- Kennedy, J. F., & Khrushchev, N. S. (1992). Back from the Brink: The Correspondence Between President John F. Kennedy and Chairman Nikita S. Khrushchev on the Cuban Missile Crisis of Autumn 1962. Washington DC: US Information Agency. (Note: Contains 25 pieces of communication, delivered from October 22 through December 14, 1962, in both English and Russian.)
- Khrushchev, N. S. (1960). For Victory in Peaceful Competition with Capitalism. New York: E. F. Dutton & Co.
- Khrushchev, N. S. (1960). Khrushchev in New York: A Documentary Record of Nikita S. Khrushchev's Trip to New York, September 19th to October 13th, 1960. New York: Crosscurrents. (Note: Including all his speeches and proposals to the United Nations and major addresses and news conferences.)
- Khrushchev, N. S. (1961–1962). Letters to John F. Kennedy. Text
- Stickle, D. M., Farrow, J. (1992). The Beria Affair: The Secret Transcripts of the Meetings Signalling the End of Stalinism. Commack: Nova Science Publishers.

Individual Documents

- Khrushchev, N. S. (1956). On the Cult of Personality and Its Consequences Text. (Note: Commonly known as the "Secret Speech". Given during the 20th Congress of the Communist Party of the Soviet Union.)

=== The Brezhnev Era (1964–1982) ===
Collections

- The Sino-Soviet Border Conflict, 1969 (Document Collection). The Wilson Center Digital Archive.
- The Nuclear Non-Proliferation Treaty, 1965-68 (Document Collection). The Wilson Center Digital Archive.
- Documents related to the Soviet Invasion of Czechoslovakia (Document Collection). The Wilson Center Digital Archive.
- Documents related to the Soviet Invasion of Afghanistan (Document Collection). The Wilson Center Digital Archive.
- 1980-81 Polish Crisis (Document Collection). The Wilson Center Digital Archive.
- McNeal, R. H., & Schwartz, D. V. (1982). Resolutions and Decisions of the Communist Party of the Soviet Union: Vol. 5, The Brezhnev Years, 1964-1981. Toronto, ON: University of Toronto Press.

=== Gorbachev Era (1982–1991) ===
Collections

- The Sino-Soviet Reapprochement, 1985-89 (Document Collection). The Wilson Center Digital Archive.
- The Chernobyl Nuclear Accident (Document Collection). The Wilson Center Digital Archive.
- The Collapse of the Soviet Union and the End of the Cold War (Document Collection). The Wilson Center Digital Archive.
- Project RYaN (Document Collection). The Wilson Center Digital Archive. (Note: Project RYaN was the 1980s KGB intelligence program related to anticipating a nuclear first strike on the Soviet Union by the United States.)

Individual documents

- Gorbachev, M. (1989). The Progress of Perestroïka. The World Today, 45(6), 94–94.

== See also ==
- Bibliography of the Russian Revolution and Civil War
- Bibliography of Stalinism and the Soviet Union
- Bibliography of Russian history (1991–present)
- Bibliography of Ukrainian history
- Bibliography of the history of Belarus and Byelorussia
- Bibliography of the history of Poland
