= Michael Cox (academic) =

British international relations scholar

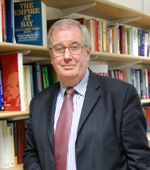

Academic work
- Institutions: London School of Economics
- Doctoral students: Felix Berenskötter
- Main interests: International relations; Diplomacy; US Foreign Policy; Cold War History

Michael E. Cox (born March 1947) is a British academic and international relations scholar. He is currently Emeritus Professor of International Relations at the London School of Economics (LSE) and Director of LSE IDEAS. He also teaches for the TRIUM Global Executive MBA Program, an alliance of NYU Stern and the London School of Economics and HEC School of Management.

== Background ==
Cox was educated at the University of Reading. He has taught at Queen's University Belfast (1972–1995), San Diego State University (1986), the College of William and Mary in Virginia (1987–1989), the University of Wales, Aberystwyth (1995–2001), the Catholic University of Milan (2003 and 2004) and the University of Melbourne (2004). He was also a visiting professor at the Centre for Defence and Strategic Studies in Canberra, Australia, between 2003 and 2004. In 2003, he became a chair at the London School of Economics.

At LSE he helped establish the Cold War Studies Centre in 2004, along with Professor Odd Arne Westad, where they were co-directors and Co-Editors of the London School of Economics CWSC journal, Cold War History. In 2008 the Cold War Studies Centre expanded into LSE IDEAS, a foreign policy centre based which aims to bring the academic and policy words together. In a 2014 international survey, IDEAS was ranked 2nd in the world amongst the best university affiliated Think Tanks.

In 2011, he launched a new Executive Masters in Global Strategy (executive MSc International Strategy and Diplomacy) designed to teach mid-career professionals from the public, private, and NGO sectors who deal with international relations, diplomacy, security, and international business in their working lives. He is the current director of the programme. In addition, since joining the LSE Cox has also acted as academic director of both the LSE-PKU Summer School and of the Executive Summer School.

== Work ==
As a writer, Cox has authored many books on international politics, the Cold War, US foreign policy and the behaviour of superpowers. He has contributed to many academic journals and has been the editor of the Review of International Studies, International Relations and International Politics. He is also the General Editor of Rethinking World Politics, a Palgrave book series. and Routledge's Cold War History.

Professor Cox is a well-known speaker on global affairs and has lectured in the United States, Australia, Asia, and in the EU. He has spoken on a range of contemporary global issues, though most recently he has focused on the role of the United States in the international system, the rise of Asia, and whether or not the world is now in the midst of a major power shift.

== Positions held ==
Cox has been a member of the executive committee of the British International Studies Association and the Irish National Committee for the Study of International Affairs. From 1994, he became an associate research fellow at Chatham House, London. Between 2001 and 2002, he was director of the David Davies Memorial Institute for the Study of International Politics. He was appointed as a senior fellow at the Nobel Institute in Oslo in 2002. In 2003, he was chair of the United States Discussion Group at the Royal Institute of International Affairs. He became a member of the board of the Cambridge Studies in International Relations in 2003. He held the Publications portfolio on the European Consortium for Political Research (ECPR) before being elected chair of the ECPR, the biggest political science association in Europe and the second largest in the world, in 2006.

== Bibliography ==
=== Books ===
- Cox, M., Beyond the Cold War: Superpowers at the crossroads?, 1990 (White Burkett Miller Center of Public Affairs)
- Cox, M., Ticktin, Hillel H. (eds), The Ideas of Leon Trotsky, 1995 (London: Porcupine)
- Cox, M., US Foreign Policy After the Cold War: Superpower Without a Mission?, 1995 (Chatham House Papers)
- Cox, M., "Rethinking the Soviet collapse: Sovietology, the death of communism and the new Russia", 1998 (London; New York : Pinter)
- Cox, M. (ed), E. H. Carr, The Twenty Years' Crisis: An Introduction to the Study of International Relations, 1919–1939, 1998 (Palgrave)
- Booth, K., Cox, M., Dunne, T. (eds), The Interregnum: Controversies in World Politics, 1989–1999, 1999 (Cambridge University Press)
- Cox, M., Ikenberry, G. J., Inoguchi, T. (eds), American Democracy Promotion: Impulses, Strategies, Impacts, 2000 (Oxford University Press)
- Cox, M. (ed), E. H. Carr: A Critical Appraisal, 2000 (Palgrave)
- Cox, M., Guelke, A., Stephen, F. (eds), Northern Ireland: A Farewell to Arms? Beyond the Good Friday Agreement, 2000, 2005 2nd Edition (Manchester University Press)
- Booth, K., Cox, M., Dunne, T. (eds), How Might We Live? Global Ethics for a New Century, 2001 (Cambridge University Press)
- Booth, K., Cox, M., Dunne, T. (eds), Empires, System and States: Great Transformations in International Politics, 2001 (Cambridge University Press)
- Cox, M. (ed), Twentieth Century International Relations: The international system, 1815-1945., 2006 (Sage Publications Ltd)
- Cox, Michael and Doug Stokes, eds. US Foreign Policy. New York: Oxford University Press, 2008.
- Cox, M., The Post Cold War World Turbulence and Change in World Politics Since the Fall, 2018, (Routledge)
- Cox, M., Agonies of Empire: American Power from Clinton to Biden, 2022, (Bristol University Press)

=== Articles ===
- Cox, M., International History since 1990, in Baylis, J., Smith, S. (eds), The Globalization of World Politics (2nd Edition), 2001 (Oxford University Press)
- Cox, M., The Search for Relevance: Historical Materialism after the Cold War, in Smith, H., Rupert, M. (eds), Historical Materialism and Globalisation: Essays in Continuity and Change, 2002 (Routledge)
- Cox, M., The Continuing Story of Another Death Foretold: Radical Theory and the New International Relations, in Breacher, M., Harvey, F. P. (eds), Millennial Reflections on International Relations, 2002 (University of Michigan Press)
- Cox, M., Meanings of Victory: American Power after the Towers, in Booth, K., Dunne, T. (eds), Worlds in Collision: The Great Terror and Global Order, 2002 (Palgrave)
- Cox, M., "A Failed Crusade?" The United States and Post-Communist Russia, in Lane, D. (ed), The Legacy of State Socialism and the Future of Transformation, 2002 (Rowman & Littlefield)
- Cox, M., America and the World, in Singh, R., Governing America: The Politics of a Divided Democracy, 2003 (Oxford University Press)
- Cox, M., American Power before and after 11 September, in Singh, R., Governing America: The Politics of a Divided Democracy, 2003 (Oxford University Press)
- Cox, M., The 1980s Revisited or the Cold War as History – Again, in Njølstad, O. (ed), The Last Decade of the Cold War: From Conflict Escalation to Conflict Transformation, 2004 (Frank Cass Publishers)
- Cox, M., Empire? The Bush Doctrine and the Lessons of History, in Held, D., Koenig-Archibugi, M. (eds), American Power in the 21st Century, 2004, (Polity Press)
- Cox, M., America at War: US Foreign Policy After 11 September, 2005 (Blackwell Publishing)
- Cox, M., and Kennedy-Pipe, Caroline "The Tragedy of American diplomacy? Rethinking the Marshall Plan" Journal of Cold War Studies, 7 (1), (2005)
- Cox, M., and Kennedy-Pipe, Caroline "The Tragedies of American Foreign Policy: Further Reflections" Journal of Cold War Studies, 7 (1), (2005)
- Cox, M., Power Shifts, Economic Change and the Decline of the West?, 2012 (International Relations, 26, 4)
- Cox, M., ‘Not just ‘Convenient’: China and Russia’s new strategic partnership in the Age of Geopolitics’, 2016 (Asian Journal of Comparative Politics., Vol. 1, 4)
- Cox, M., From the End of the Cold War to a new Global Era?, in Baylis, John; Smith, Steve; Owens, Patricia (eds); The Globalization of World Politics: An introduction to international relations, New York: Oxford University Press, 2017, 7th ed.
- Cox, M., Buzan, Barry, "The End of Anglo-America?", in Tonny Brems Knudsen, Cornelia Navari (eds), Power Transition in the Anarchical Society: Rising Powers, Institutional Change and the New World Order, Springer, (2022)
- Cox, M., Roundtable on Nationalism and After: With a New Introduction from Michael Cox, H-Diplo, (2022)
- Cox, M., Roundtable on Agonies of Empire, H-Diplo, (2024)
