= Patricia Owens (disambiguation) =

Patricia Owens (1925–2000) was a Canadian actress.

Patricia Owens may also refer to:

- Patricia Owens (academic) (born 1975), British-Irish academic, author, and professor
- Pat Owens (1941–2024), Patrica A. Owens, American mayor and politician
