= Cold War History =

Cold War History may refer to:

- Cold War
- Cold War History (journal)
