= The Globalization of World Politics =

Academic book by John Baylis, Steve Smith and Patricia Owens

The Globalization of World Politics: An Introduction to International Relations (6th ed)
- First edition
- Editors: Patricia Owens, John Baylis, Steve Smith
- Language: English
- Genre: Nonfiction
- Publisher: Oxford University Press
- Publication date: 1997
- Media type: Paperback, Hardback
- Pages: 648
- ISBN: 978-0-19-965617-2
- OCLC: 174500731
- Dewey Decimal: 327 22
- LC Class: JZ1242 .G58 2008

The Globalization of World Politics: An Introduction to International Relations is an introduction to international relations (IR) and offers comprehensive coverage of key theories and global issues. Edited by John Baylis, Patricia Owens, and Steve Smith. It has ten editions, first published in 1997, in this book leading scholars in the field introduce readers to the history, theory, structures, and key issues in IR, providing students with an ideal introduction and a constant guide throughout their studies.

== About the Author ==
Patricia Owens is author and professor. She is a Tutorial Fellow at Somerville College, Oxford and a professor of International Relations at University of Oxford.

John Baylis is emeritus professor of politics and international relations and a former pro vice chancellor at Swansea University.

Steve Smith is the former Vice Chancellor of the University of Exeter and Professor of International Studies.

== Table of contents ==
=== Part One: International relations in a global era ===
- 1 "Introduction: from international politics to world politics" — John Baylis, Steve Smith and Patricia Owens
- 2 "Globalization and global politics" — Anthony McGrew

=== Part Two: The historical context ===
- 3 "The evolution of international order" — George Lawson
- 4 "International history of the twentieth century" — Len Scott
- 5 "From the end of the cold war to the new world dis-order" — Michael Cox
- 6 "Rising powers and the emerging global order" — Andrew Hurrell

=== Part Three: Theories of world politics ===
- 7 "Liberal Internationalism" — Tim Dunne
- 8 "Marxist theories of international relations" — Stephen Hobden and Richard Wyn Jones
- 9 "Realism" — Or Rosenboim
- 10 "Feminism" — Helen M. Kinsella
- 11 "Post colonial and decolonial approaches" — Meera Sabaratnam
- 12 "Poststructuralism" — Lene Hansen
- 13 "Social constructivism" — Michael Barnett

=== Part Four: Structures and processes ===
- 14 "War and world politics" — Tarak Barkawi
- 15 "International and global security" — John Baylis
- 16 "Global political economy" — Nicola Phillips
- 17 "Gender" — Paul Kirby
- 18 "Race in world politics" — Robbie Shilliam
- 19 "International law" — Christian Reus-Smit
- 20 "International organizations in world politics" — Susan Park
- 21 "The United Nations" — Paul Taylor and Devon Curtis
- 22 "NGOs in world politics" — Jutta Joachim
- 23 "Regionalism in international affairs" — Edward Best and Thomas Christiansen

=== Part Five: International issues ===
- 24 "Environmental issues" — John Vogler
- 25 "Global health" — Sophie Harman
- 26 "Refugees and forced migration" — Ariadna Estévez
- 27 "Poverty, hunger and development" — Tony Evans
- 28 "Global trade and global finance" — Matthew Watson
- 29 "Terrorism and globalization" — James D. Kiras
- 30 "Proliferation of weapons of mass destruction" — Sheena Chestnut Greitens
- 31 "Nationalism, national self-determination and international relations" — John Breuilly
- 32 "Human rights" — Ratna Kapur
- 33 "Humanitarian intervention in world politics" — Alex J. Bellamy and Nicholas J. Wheeler
