= Odd Arne Westad =

Norwegian historian (born 1960)

Arne Westad FBA
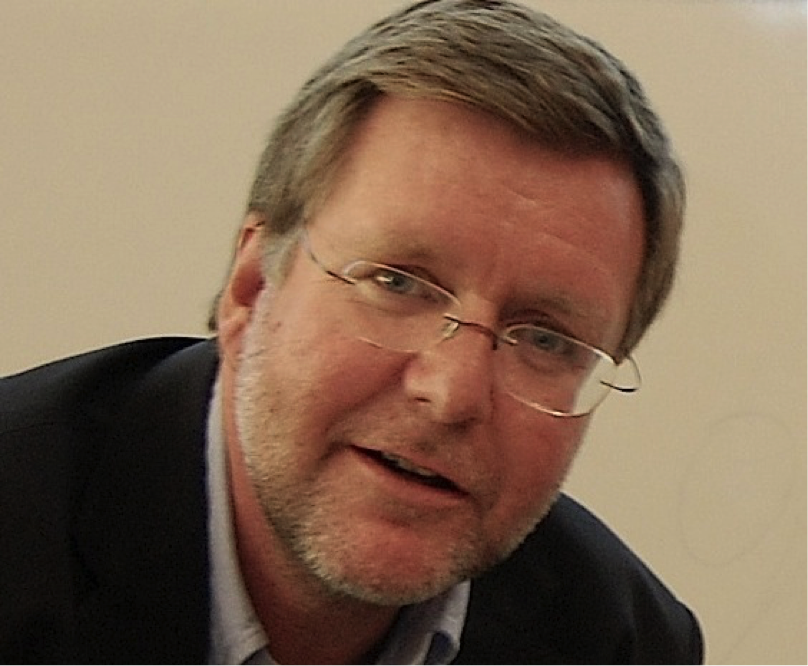
- Westad in 2015
- Born: Odd Arne Westad; January 5, 1960 (age 66)
- Education: University of North Carolina at Chapel Hill; University of Oslo
- Occupation: Historian
- Known for: International relations; diplomacy; Asia; history
- Office: Elihu Professor of History and Global Affairs, Yale University
- Website: oaw.cn

Odd Arne Westad FBA (born 5 January 1960) is a Norwegian historian specializing in the Cold War and contemporary East Asian history. He is the Elihu Professor of History and Global Affairs at Yale University, where he teaches in the Yale History Department and in the Jackson School of Global Affairs. Previously, Westad held the S.T. Lee Chair of US-Asia Relations at Harvard University, teaching in the John F. Kennedy School of Government. He has also taught at the London School of Economics, where he served as director of LSE IDEAS. In the spring semester 2019 Westad was Boeing Company Chair in International Relations at Schwarzman College, Tsinghua University.

== Background ==
After studying as an undergraduate at the University of Oslo, Westad attended the University of North Carolina at Chapel Hill to work on his Ph.D. under Michael H. Hunt. He was appointed director of research at the Norwegian Nobel Institute and adjunct professor of history at the University of Oslo in 1991. In 1998, he left Oslo to join the International History Department at the LSE, where he also worked in the LSE Asia Research Centre before becoming department head in 2003.

While at LSE, Westad set up LSE IDEAS, the LSE's centre for international affairs, diplomacy and strategy, together with Professor Michael Cox in 2008. Westad speaks and writes in a number of languages, including his native Norwegian, English, French, German, Mandarin and Russian. He is a well known lecturer in several countries, both on history and on contemporary international affairs, especially with regard to China and East Asia.

In 2014, Westad became the inaugural holder of the S. T. Lee Chair of US-Asia Relations at Harvard University, where he taught international affairs and global history at the John F. Kennedy School of Government. He was also a Senior Scholar at the Harvard Academy of International and Area Studies. In 2019, Westad joined Yale University, where he now teaches courses in global and international history. He is based both in the Yale History Department and in the Jackson School of Global Affairs. Westad also has a secondary appointment at Yale Law School, where he directs the Paul Tsai China Center.

== Work ==
Westad is particularly known for his re-evaluation of the history of the Cold War. His interpretation emphasizes the role of the conflict on a global scale, and not just in Europe or North America. He also underlines the ideological origins of the Cold War and the long-term effects it had in Asia, Africa, and Latin America. The term 'global Cold War' is often associated with Westad's work and has been taken up by many historians and social scientists.

Westad is also known for his work on Chinese and East Asian history and contemporary international affairs. In his books, he stresses the links between China and the outside world, noting that China's opening to the outside is not a new phenomenon. He often speaks of contemporary China, more than most countries, as a hybrid society, consisting both of Chinese and foreign elements. He has been critical of current Chinese foreign policy, which he sees as too nationalistic, although he is in favor of other countries working with China rather than trying to contain it.

Westad was the editor of the University of North Carolina Press's book series on the Cold War (2009-2024) and founding editor of the journal Cold War History.

As well as his work at the London School of Economics, Westad has held Visiting Fellowships at Cambridge University and New York University. He has received major grants for research from the British Arts and Humanities Research Board, the John D. and Catherine T. MacArthur Foundation and the Leverhulme Trust. He also worked as the International Coordinator of the Russian Foreign Ministry's Advisory Group on Declassification and Archival Access. In 2011 he was nominated as one of two candidates for president of the American Historical Association. From 2013 to 2016 Westad also served as Distinguished Visiting research professor at the University of Hong Kong, and since 2016 he has been a guest professor in the History Department at Peking University.

Westad has published fifteen books on international history and contemporary international affairs, including a new version of the Penguin History of the World (2013). He co-edited the three-volume Cambridge History of the Cold War (2010) with Melvyn Leffler. His Restless Empire: China and the World since 1750 (2012) surveys the last 250 years of China's relations with the world, and The Cold War: A World History (2017) provides an overview of the conflict and its long-term significance. The Times Literary Supplement, making it one of its books of the year, called it "a book of resounding importance for appraising our global future as well as understanding our past."

== Awards ==
Westad's book, The Global Cold War: Third World Interventions and the Making of Our Times, won the 2006 Bancroft Prize, the Michael Harrington Prize of the American Political Science Association, and the Akira Iriye International History Book Award. It was also shortlisted for the Council on Foreign Relations' Arthur Ross Award for the best book published in the last two years on international affairs. Restless Empire won the Asia Society's Bernard Schwartz Book Award for 2013. Westad is a fellow of the British Academy, of the Norwegian Academy of Science and Letters, and of the Academia Europaea. In 2012 he gave the British Academy's Sarah Tryphena Phillips Lecture in American Literature and History, on Ronald Reagan and the Re-Constitution of American Hegemony.

== Publications ==
=== Books ===
- Westad, O. A. (eds), Cold War and Revolution: Soviet-American Rivalry and the Origins of the Chinese Civil War, 1993 (Columbia University Press) ISBN 0-231-07985-0
- Holtsmark, S. G., Neumann, I. B., Westad, O. A. (eds), The Soviet Union in Eastern Europe, 1945-89, 1994 (Palgrave Macmillan) ISBN 0-333-60230-7
- Westad, O. A., The Fall of Détente: Soviet-American Relations During the Carter Years, 1997 (Aschehoug AS) ISBN 82-00-37671-0
- Westad, O. A. (ed), Brothers in Arms: The Rise and Fall of the Sino-Soviet Alliance, 1945-1963, 1998 (Stanford, CA: Stanford University Press) ISBN 0-8047-3485-2
- Westad, O. A. (ed), Reviewing the Cold War: Approaches, Interpretations, Theory, 2000 (Routledge) ISBN 0-7146-8120-2
- Kang, G. H., Moon, C. Y., Westad, O. A. (eds), Ending the Cold War in Korea: Theoretical and Historical Perspectives, 2001 (Seoul: Yonsei University Press) ISBN 89-7141-563-0
- Westad, O. A., Decisive Encounters: The Chinese Civil War, 1945-1950, 2003 (Stanford, CA: Stanford University Press) ISBN 0-8047-4478-5
- Hanhimäki, J., Westad, O. A., The Cold War: A History in Documents and Eyewitness Accounts, 2003 (Oxford University Press) ISBN 0-19-927280-8
- Westad, O. A., Beginnings of the End: How the Cold War Crumbled, in Pons, S., Romero, F., Reinterpreting the End of the Cold War: Issues, Interpretations, Periodizations, 2005 (London: Frank Cass) ISBN 0-203-00609-7 (hardback) ISBN 0-7146-8486-4 (paperback)
- Westad, O. A., The Global Cold War: Third World Interventions and the Making of Our Times, 2006 (Cambridge: Cambridge University Press) ISBN 0-521-85364-8 ; French translation: La Guerre froide globale. Le tiers-monde, les Etats-Unis et l'URSS, 1945-1991 (Paris, Payot, 2007)
- Quinn-Judge, S., Westad, O. A. (eds), The Third Indochina War, 2006 (Routledge) ISBN 0-415-39058-3
- Roberts, J., Westad O. A., The New Penguin History of the World, 2007 (Penguin) ISBN 978-0-14-103042-5
- Villaume, P., Westad, O. A. (eds), Perforating the Iron Curtain. European Détente, Transatlantic Relations and the Cold War, 1965-1985 (Copenhagen: Museum Tusculanum Press, 2010) ISBN 978-87-635-2588-6
- Leffler, M. P., Westad, O.A. (eds), The Cambridge History of the Cold War, (Cambridge: Cambridge University Press, 2010).
- Odd Arne Westad. Restless Empire: China and the World since 1750. (New York: Basic Books, 2012) ISBN 978-0-465-01933-5
- Odd Arne Westad. The Cold War: A World History (New York: Basic Books, 2017) ISBN 978-0-465-05493-0
- Odd Arne Westad. Empire and Righteous Nation: 600 Years of China-Korea Relations (Harvard University Press, 2021) ISBN 978-06-742-3821-3
- Odd Arne Westad, Chen Jian. The Great Transformation: China's Road from Revolution to Reform (Yale University Press, 2024) ISBN 978-0-300-26708-2
- Odd Arne Westad. The Coming Storm: Power, Conflict, and Warnings from History (Henry Holt and Company, 2026) ISBN 978-1-250-41028-3

=== Articles ===
- Sleepwalking Toward War, Foreign Affairs, June 13, 2024
