= Doug Stokes =

British academic

Doug Stokes (born 1972) is a British academic.

He completed his degree at London University in 1997, and worked in the still conflict-prone town of Brčko in Bosnia. He returned to full time education in 2000 for his master's degree, and completed his Ph.D. at Bristol in 2003.

== Legacy ==
He has published a number of books and articles on US foreign policy, grand strategy and world order. His most recent books include an edited volume with Professor Michael Cox (of the London School of Economics) entitled US foreign policy (Oxford University Press, 2008; 2nd edition 2012; 3rd edition 2018) and Energy Security and American Hegemony (Johns Hopkins University Press in June 2010).

He is a member of the Royal Institute of International Affairs (Chatham House) and Senior Associate Fellow at the Royal United Services Institute (RUSI).

== Works ==
- Stokes D (2001). Better lead than bread? a Critical Analysis of the US’s Plan Colombia. Civil Wars, 2, 59-78.
- Stokes D (2003). Why the end of the Cold War doesn't matter: the US war of terror in Colombia. Review of International Studies, 29(4), 569-585+464.
- Stokes D (2003). Countering the Soviet Threat? an Analysis of the Justifications for US Military Assistance to El Salvador from 1979–1992. Cold War History, 3, 79-102.
- Stokes D (2005). The Heart of Empire? Theorizing US Empire in an Era of Transnational Capitalism. Third World Quarterly: journal of emerging areas, 2, 227-246.
- Stokes D (2005). America's Other War., Zed Books.
- Stokes D (2006). Iron Fists in Iron Gloves: the Political Economy of US Terrorocracy Promotion in Colombia. The British Journal of Politics and International Relations, 368-387.
- Stokes D (2007). Blood for Oil? Global Capital, Counter-Insurgency and the Dual Logic of American Energy Security. Review of International Studies, 2, 245-264.
- Stokes D (2008). Beyond Geo-strategy and Solidarism. In Coicaud J-M, Wheeler NJ (Eds.) National interest and international solidarity, United Nations Univ. Abstract.
- Stokes D (2009). The war gamble: Understanding US interests in Iraq. Globalizations, 6(1), 107-112.
- Stokes D (2009). New Directions in US Foreign Policy. In Parmar I (Ed) New Directions in US Foreign Policy, Taylor & Francis.
- Stokes D (2009). Ideas and Avocados: Ontologising Critical Terrorism Studies’. International Relations Journal
- Stokes D, Raphael S (2010). Global Energy Security and American Hegemony., Johns Hopkins University Press.
- Kiersey NJ, Stokes D (2010). Foucault and International Relations., Routledge.
- Stokes D, Raphael S (2011). Globalizing West African oil: US ‘energy security’ and the global economy. International Affairs, 87(4), 903-921.
- Stokes D, Herring E (2011). Critical Realism and Historical Materialism as Resources for Critical Terrorism Studies. Critical Studies on Terrorism, 4(1), 5-21.
- Stokes D, Gowan P (2012). The US in the Global Economy. In Stokes D, Cox M (Eds.) US Foreign Policy.
- Stokes D, Raphael S (2012). Energy Security in the Age of Terror. In Collins A (Ed) Contemporary Security Studies, OUP Oxford.
- Stokes D, Whitman R (2013). Transatlantic Triage? European and UK ‘Grand Strategy’ after the US Rebalance to Asia. International Affairs
- Stokes D (2013). Goodbye America?: Transatlantic Grand Strategy after the Financial Crisis. RUSI Journal, 158(4), 70-75.
- Stokes D, Raphael S (2014). US Oil Strategy in the Caspian Basin: Hegemony through interdependence. International Relations Journal
- Stokes D, Newton P (2014). Bridging the Gulf? America's 'Pivot' and the Middle East Challenge it Poses for the UK's Strategic Defence and Security Review. RUSI Journal
- Stokes D (2014). Achilles’ deal: Dollar decline and US grand strategy after the crisis. Review of International Political Economy, 21(5), 1071-1094.
- Stokes D, Waterman K (2017). Security leverage, structural power and US strategy in east Asia. International Affairs, 93(5), 1039-1060.
- Stokes D, Waterman K (2017). Beyond balancing? Intrastate conflict and US grand strategy. Journal of Strategic Studies, 41(6), 824-849.
- Cox M, Stokes D (2018). US foreign policy., Oxford University Press, USA.
- Stansfield G, Stokes D, Kelly S (2018). UK strategy in the gulf and middle east after American retrenchment. Insight Turkey, 20(4), 231-247.
- Stokes D (2018). Trump, American hegemony and the future of the liberal international order. INTERNATIONAL AFFAIRS, 94(1), 133-+.
- Stokes D (2018). The Sneer of Cold Command’: Trump, American Hegemony and the Future of the Liberal International Order. International Affairs, 94, 133-150.
- Ikenberry GJ, Parmar I, Stokes D (2018). Introduction: Ordering the world? Liberal internationalism in theory and practice. INTERNATIONAL AFFAIRS, 94(1), 1-5.
- Stokes D (2022). Energy Security. In Collins A (Ed) Contemporary Security Studies: 6th Edition, Oxford University Press.
- Stokes D (2023). Against Decolonisation: Campus Culture Wars and the Decline of the West. Oxford, Polity Press.
