= LSE IDEAS =

Foreign policy think tank in London, England

LSE IDEAS is a foreign policy think tank at the London School of Economics and Political Science. IDEAS was founded as a think tank for Diplomacy and Strategy in February 2008, succeeding the Cold War Studies Centre founded in 2004. It is led by Professor Christopher Alden (as Director) and Professor Michael Cox (as Chair of the Academic Management Committee). LSE IDEAS has been ranked as the top European university-affiliated think tank and the number two university-affiliated think tank in the world.

IDEAS runs multiple research projects, hosts public and private events such as public lectures, debates, policy workshops, and international conferences, and publishes analysis of international affairs. From 2017 to 2018, it released 75 publications and held 43 fellowships and scholarships. In addition, IDEAS houses the LSE Executive MSc International Strategy and Diplomacy, an executive master's degree programme designed to enhance the strategic vision of mid-career professionals.

== Activity ==
Through sustained engagement with policymakers and opinion leaders, IDEAS aims to provide a forum that informs policy debate and connects academic research with the practice of diplomacy and strategy.

=== Current IDEAS Projects ===
- Central and South East Europe Programme: A programme within LSE IDEAS that focuses on the connectivity between the states of this region, their history and the interaction with present-day wider trends and global phenomena.
- China Foresight: Analysing Chinese strategy and foreign policy from the inside out by understanding the domestic policy making process in China and engaging with the ongoing debates among Chinese academics and senior policy-makers.
- Cold War Studies Project: Continuing the work of IDEAS on the key aspects of the Cold War, their historical origins and their contemporary repercussions. CWSP is home to the journal Cold War History and a range of international partnerships.
- Dahrendorf Forum: A joint project between the LSE and German partners the Hertie School of Governance in Berlin and Stiftung Mercator contributing to the debate on Europe's external relations.
- Digital IR in the Information Age: The Digital IR project aims to identify trends and developments in the world of technology and examine their implications for international relations.
- Global Strategies: Connecting academics with Whitehall and beyond. The aim of the project is to provide sound practical advice on how strategy can be made more effective, bringing together a wide range of academics from LSE with senior practitioners past and present from the UK and overseas.
- The LSE Global South Unit: A collaborative partnership between the LSE Global South Unit (GSU) and LSE IDEAS to deliver joint events, combining resources to deliver events with a greater impact than those hosted individually. In addition to these jointly delivered events, LSE IDEAS has contributed to several Global South Unit publications.
- United Nations at LSE: United Nations at LSE promotes the collaboration between LSE IDEAS and UN agencies and the sharing of LSE's best work on and with the UN.

=== Engelsberg Chair ===
In May 2019, LSE IDEAS announced a new chair in History and International Affairs, the Engelsberg Chair, with funding from the Axel and Margaret Ax:son Johnson Foundation. The Engelsberg Chair is an annual distinguished visiting professorship for leading Swedish and global scholars who will give public lectures on topics of their choice. The annual post gives LSE IDEAS the opportunity to bring renowned academics to the School for a year of research and discussion.

Professor Michael Burleigh has been appointed as the first Engelsberg Chair for 2019–20. Professor Arne Westad will succeed Professor Michael Burleigh as the second Engelsberg Chair in 2020–21.

=== Philippe Roman Chair ===
Up until 2016, IDEAS hosted the Philippe Roman Chair in History and International Affairs, an annual visiting Professor position for leading scholars based outside the UK made possible by a donation to honour the memory of Philippe Roman. Each chair delivers a series of public lectures of the duration of the year.

Notable chairs include Ian Morris, Paul Kennedy, Niall Ferguson and Anne Applebaum.

=== Select Publications ===
- People, Profits and Peace (2019)
- Ireland-UK Relations and Northern Ireland after Brexit (2019)
- China’s Belt and Road Initiative (BRI) and Southeast Asia (2018)
- The UK's Foreign, Defence, and Security Policy After Brexit (2017)
- After the Drug Wars (2016)
- Investing for Influence: LSE Diplomacy Commission Report (2015)
- Ending the Drug Wars: Report of the LSE Expert Group on the Economics of Drug Policy (2014)
- Putinism: The Ideology (2013)
- Governing the Global Drug Wars (2012)
- China's Geoeconomic Strategy (2012)
- The United States After Unipolarity (2011)
- The Future of UK Foreign Policy (2010)
- Prospects for Reform? The Iranian Elections (2009)

=== Executive Education ===
IDEAS houses the LSE Executive MSc International Strategy and Diplomacy. The 1-year programme is designed for mid-career professionals from the public, private, and NGO sectors who deal with international relations, diplomacy, security, and international business in their working lives.

The programme aims to provide its participants with the conceptual and theoretical tools to analyse the main actors, trends and issues shaping international affairs. The programme is also focused on applicability and relevance: participants learn not only how to use strategy to deal with adversaries, but also to cooperate with others in solving common problems, be they military, diplomatic/political, economic or business. The programme is taught by a combination of academics and senior policy practitioners.

Notable alumni include former UK Ambassador to Afghanistan Karen Pierce and current UK Ambassador to Bosnia and Herzegovina Edward Ferguson.

=== Participation at the G20's Think20 Engagement Group ===
LSE IDEAS was also part of the G20's Think20 (T20) Engagement Group during India's 2023 presidency with LSE IDEAS Director Professor Chris Alden co-chairing the Task Force on Reformed Multilateralism. Kenddrick Chan from LSE IDEAS's Digital IR project also spoke at a panel on Digital Public Infrastructure at the Think20 Mid-Year Conference.

== Governance and Advisory Board ==
The work of IDEAS is overseen and supported by both an Academic Management Committee and advisory board respectively.

The Academic Management Committee is composed of academic staff from LSE who monitor operations and research, while the advisory board provides an external perspective. Members of the advisory board are senior practitioners from the diplomatic world who provide independent oversight and guidance on IDEAS’ strategy.

Current Advisory Board members:

- Sir Richard Mottram (chair)
- Sir Gordon Barrass
- Sir Colin Budd
- Dr. John Hughes
- Sir David Manning
- Guy Monson
- Jonathan Powell
- Danny Quah
- Gideon Rachman
- Emmanuel Roman
- Hugh Sandeman
- Susan Scholefield
- Cato Stonex
- Leslie Vinjamuri
- Lord Wallace of Saltaire
- Linda Yueh

== See also ==
- List of think tanks in the United Kingdom
