= The Cold War: A World History =

2017 book by Odd Arne Westad

- Author: Odd Arne Westad
- Language: English
- Published: 2017 (Penguin)
- Publisher: Allen Lane
- Publication place: United Kingdom
- ISBN: 978-0-14-197991-5

The Cold War: A World History is a book by Odd Arne Westad.

== Themes ==
The Cold War: A World History is divided into 22 chapters.

Westad is critical of both sides of the Cold War in the book.

== Reception ==
Ian Thomson described the work as "well-researched if occasionally bland-sounding".
