= Martha Brill Olcott =

American political scientist (1949–2024)

- Born: December 8, 1949; The Bronx, New York, U.S.
- Died: February 5, 2024 (aged 74)
- Education: SUNY-Buffalo B.A. 1970; University of Chicago M.A. 1973, Ph.D. 1978
- Occupation: Political scientist
- Employer(s): Russia and Eurasia Program, Carnegie Endowment, Washington, D.C. Government of Kazakhstan, Nur-Sultan, Kazakhstan
- Known for: Expert in Central Asia, Russia and Eurasia, the Caspian region, Kazakhstan, Uzbekistan, ethnicity, terrorism, oil and gas policy, natural resources, democracy, U.S.-Russia relations, foreign and humanitarian aid, and Islam
- Title: senior associate
- Board member of: Central Asian American Enterprise Fund, 1994-2000, Vice Chairman 1999
- Spouse: m. Anthony C Olcott July 5, 1975
- Children: Alison; Andrew; Hillary
- Website: "Martha Brill Olcott". Carnegie Endowment for International Peace. Archived from the original on 2005-10-20.

Martha Brill Olcott (1949 – February 5, 2024) was an American political scientist who was an expert on Central Asia and the Caspian. She was a senior associate with the Russian and Eurasian Program at the Carnegie Endowment for International Peace, co-directing the Carnegie Moscow Center's Project on Ethnicity and Politics in the former Soviet Union from 1995 to 2014. Olcott taught political science at Colgate University from 1975 until 1998. She previously served as a special consultant to Acting United States Secretary of State Lawrence Eagleburger and as director of the Central Asian American Enterprise Fund. Olcott was a visiting professor at the James Madison College of Michigan State University.

Olcott received her graduate degrees from the University of Chicago. She died on February 5, 2024, at the age of 74.

== Views ==
Olcott criticized the amount of aid the U.S. government gives to Central Asian entities, saying, "The United States has had declining influence in the area and this isn't going to stop it [the decline]." She also says the government focused too much on Afghanistan.

Olcott commented on the effects of the 2008 financial crisis on Central Asia. She indicated her support for economic development to continue here as an extension of economic integration with Russia and China, as well as an increase in aid and investment from international financial institutions.

== Books ==
(links to Google Books)

- Kazakhstan: Unfulfilled Promise
- Getting it Wrong: Regional Cooperation and the Commonwealth of Independent States
- Russia After Communism
- The Kazakhs
