= David S. Mason =

American political scientist (born 1947)

David Stewart Mason (born November 23, 1947) is the Professor Emeritus of Political Science at Butler University in Indianapolis. His most recent book, The End of the American Century (Rowman & Littlefield, 2008) explores the interrelated dimensions of America's domestic and international decline. That book has been translated and published in China, by the Shanghai Lexicographical Publishing House.

Mason was born in Washington, D.C. in 1947; received his B.A. in Government from Cornell University in 1969; his M.A. in International Affairs from the Johns Hopkins School of Advanced International Studies in 1971; and his Ph.D. in Political Science from Indiana University Bloomington in 1978. Mason has received research grants from the National Science Foundation, the Rockefeller Foundation, the American Council of Learned Societies, the National Council for Soviet and East European Research, the International Research and Exchanges Board, and the Social Science Research Council.
