= Robert H. McNeal =

American historian

Robert H. (Hatch) McNeal (1930–1988) was an American historian, author, and expert on the history of the Soviet Union.

McNeal was born in 1930 in Newark, New Jersey. In 1952 he earned his B.A. from Yale University, and his M.A. (1954) and Ph.D. (1958) from Columbia University. In 1969 McNeal joined the University of Massachusetts Amherst and headed its History department from 1971 to 1975. He died in 1988 in a car accident.

== Works ==
- The Bolshevik Tradition, Lenin Stalin Khrushchev Brezhnev, 2nd ed.

(Englewood Cliffs, NJ: Prentice-Hall, Inc., c1963, c1975)

- Bride of the Revolution. Krupskaya and Lenin
- Resolutions and Decisions of the Communist Party of the Soviet Union, vols 1-5 (editor).
- Stalin: Works, vols XIV-XVI (editor)
- Stalin: Man and Ruler New York: New York University Press, 1988)
