= Patricia Owens (academic) =

Political scientist

- Born: 1975 (age 50–51)
- Education: Bristol University; University of Cambridge; Aberystwyth University

Patricia Owens is a British-Irish academic, author and professor. She is a Tutorial Fellow at Somerville College, Oxford and a professor of International Relations at University of Oxford. She is best known for her work on the history and theory of counterinsurgency warfare, women and the history of international thought, the history of social and political thought, and for her earlier work on war and international relations in the thought of the German-American political theorist Hannah Arendt.

Owens' book, Economy of Force: Counterinsurgency and the Historical Rise of the Social won the 2016 Susan Strange Prize for the Best Book in international studies and the 2016 International Studies Association Theory Section Best Book Award.

== Education ==
Owens was born in London to Irish immigrant parents in 1975. After completing a degree in Politics from Bristol University, she received her MPhil in International Relations from the University of Cambridge in 1998. Subsequently, she became the Jane Eliza Proctor Research Fellow in Politics department at the Princeton University before completing her PhD at Aberystwyth University in 2003. During her PhD, she was a visiting scholar at UC Berkeley on an Social Science Research Council (SSRC) research fellowship. Owens was a pre-doctoral research fellow at Princeton University and a post-doctoral research fellow at the University of Southern California.

== Career ==
In 2004, she became the Seton-Watson Research Fellow in International Relations at Oriel College, Oxford and part of the Oxford-Leverhulme Programme on the Changing Character of War. In 2007, she moved to Queen Mary University of London as a senior lecturer in International Relations and taught there until 2011. Simultaneously, in 2010, she was a visiting professor at UCLA. In 2011, she moved to the University of Sussex. From 2012 to 2013, she was a Fellow of the Radcliffe Institute for Advanced Study, Harvard. She became a Professor of International Relations in 2015. and was Head of the Department of International Relations between 2017 and 2019. In 2020, she was made a Tutorial Fellow at Somerville College, Oxford and a Professor International Relations at Oxford.

Owens published her first book, Between War and Politics: International Relations and the Thought of Hannah Arendt in 2007. In 2015, she published her second book, Economy of Force: Counterinsurgency and the Historical Rise of the Social, a new history of theory of counterinsurgency/armed social work. It won the 2016 Susan Strange Prize for the Best Book in international studies, the 2016 International Studies Association Theory Section Best Book Award, and was Runner up for the 2016 Francesco Guicciardini Prize for Best Book in Historical International Relations.

She is a longtime co-editor of the textbook, The Globalization of World Politics: an Introduction to International Relations, published by Oxford, and currently in its seventh edition. She was also co-editor of European Journal of International Relations between 2013 and 2017.

=== Research interests ===
Owens is best known for her work on the history and theory of counterinsurgency warfare, women and the history of international thought, the history of social and political thought, and for her earlier work on war and international relations in the thought of the German-American political theorist Hannah Arendt. From 2018 until 2022, she will be the Principal Investigator on a Leverhulme Research Project, Women and the History of International Thought, which rewrites the intellectual and disciplinary history of International Relations.

== Bibliography ==
- Economy of Force: Counterinsurgency and the Historical Rise of the Social (Cambridge: Cambridge University Press, 2015), Studies in International Relations series.
- Between War and Politics: International Relations and the Thought of Hannah Arendt (Oxford: Oxford University Press, 2007)
- Women's International Thought: A New History (Cambridge: Cambridge University Press, 2021). Editor with Katharina Rietzler
- Women's International Thought: Toward a New Canon (Cambridge: Cambridge University Press, forthcoming). Editor with Katharina Rietzler, Kimberly Hutchings, Sarah C. Dunstan
- 'Women Thinkers and the Canon of International Thought: Recovery, Rejection, and Reconstitution', American Political Science Review, 2021. With Kimberly Hutchings
- 'Women and the History of International Thought', International Studies Quarterly, Vol.62, no.3 (2018), pp. 467–481
- Method or Madness: Sociolatry in International Thought, Review of International Studies, Vol.41, no.4 (2015) pp. 655–674
- From Bismarck to Petraeus: The Question of the Social and the Social Question in Counterinsurgency, European Journal of International Relations, 19(1) (2013) pp. 135–157
- The Globalization of World Politics: An Introduction to International Relations (8th edition) (Oxford: Oxford University Press, 2020). Editor with John Baylis and Steve Smith.
- The Globalization of World Politics: International 3rd Edition (Oxford: Oxford University Press, 2020). Editor with Baylis and Smith. The ‘international’ adaptation of GWP
- Reclaiming “Bare Life”? Against Agamben on Refugees, International Relations, Vol.23, no.4 (2009) pp. 567–82
