= Cold War History (journal) =

- Language: English

Standard abbreviations
- ISO 4: Cold War Hist.

Indexing
- ISSN: 1468-2745 (print); 1743-7962 (web)

Links
- Journal homepage

Cold War History is a quarterly peer-reviewed academic journal covering the history of the Cold War. It was established in 2000 and is published by Routledge. The Managing Editors are Harriet Solomon (London School of Economics and Political Science) and Mina Rigby-Thompson (University of London).

The journal is abstracted and indexed in America: History and Life, CSA Worldwide Political Science Abstracts, Historical Abstracts, International Bibliography of the Social Sciences, Arts & Humanities Citation Index, and the Social Sciences Citation Index. According to the Journal Citation Reports, the journal has a 2014 impact factor of 0.357.
