= Bibliography of Poland during World War II =

This is a select bibliography of English language books (including translations) and journal articles about the history of Poland during World War II. For works about the overall history of Poland, please see Bibliography of the history of Poland.

Works listed here are cited in the notes or bibliographies of scholarly sources. Each is published by an academic or major press, written by a recognized expert, or substantially reviewed in scholarly journals; borderline cases are omitted. A selection of primary sources are included. Many of the books below carry their own bibliographies; see the Further reading section for other bibliographies, and the External links section for historical sites, academic sites, and museums.

Citations follow APA style. (Note: Entries are in plain text APA 7 format without templates; templates are used only for reviews and notes.) Book have citations to academic journal or mainstream published reviews when available. For books only partly about the subject, relevant chapter or section titles are provided when useful and available. Translators of the original-language edition are included when possible. In cases where a title or name has appeared with more than one English spelling, the most recent published form is used and a footnote documents any earlier title under which the work appeared.

== General surveys ==
- Davies, N. (2007). No Simple Victory: World War II in Europe, 1939-1945. New York: Viking.
- Furber, D. (2004). Near As Far in the Colonies: The Nazi Occupation of Poland. The International History Review, 26(3), 541–579.
- Garliński, J. (1985). Poland in the Second World War. New York: Palgrave Macmillan.
- Gross, J. T. (2019). Polish Society Under German Occupation: The Generalgouvernement, 1939-1944 (Princeton Legacy Library). Princeton: Princeton University Press.
- Kochanski, H. (2012). The Eagle Unbowed: Poland and the Poles in the Second World War. Cambridge: Harvard University Press.
- McGilvray, E. (2019). Poland and the Second World War, 1938–1948. Barnsley: Pen & Sword Military.
- Paczkowski, A. (2003). The Spring Will Be Ours: Poland and the Poles from Occupation to Freedom (Note: Work covers period from 1939-1989.) (J. Cave, Trans.). University Park: Pennsylvania State University Press.
- Rawson, A. (2019). Poland's Struggle: Before, During and After the Second World War. Barnsley: Pen and Sword Military.

== Regional surveys ==
- Bergen, D. L. (2005). Tenuousness and Tenacity: The Volksdeutschen of Eastern Europe, World War II, and the Holocaust. In K. O'Donnell, R. Bridenthal, & N. Reagin (Eds.), The Heimat Abroad: The Boundaries of Germanness (pp. 267–286). University of Michigan Press.
- Mazower, M. (2008). Hitler's Empire. Nazi Rule in Occupied Europe. New York: Penguin.
- Pinchuk, B. C. (1978). The Sovietization of the Jewish Community of Eastern Poland 1939-1941. Slavonic and East European Review, 56(3), 387–410.
- Prażmowska, A. J. (2000). Eastern Europe and the Origins of the Second World War. New York: Red Globe Press.
- Ther, P., & Siljak, A. (Eds.). (2001). Redrawing Nations: Ethnic Cleansing in East-Central Europe, 1944–1948 (The Harvard Cold War Studies Book). Lanham: Rowman & Littlefield Publishers.

== Military ==
- Davies, N. (2015). Trail of Hope: The Anders Army, An Odyssey Across Three Continents. Oxford: Osprey Publishing.
- Drzewieniecki, W. M. (1981). The Polish Army on the Eve of World War II. The Polish Review, 26(3), 54–64.
- Forczyk, R. (2019). Case White: The Invasion of Poland 1939. Oxford: Osprey Publishing.
- Gross, J. (2002). Revolution from Abroad: The Soviet Conquest of Poland's Western Ukraine and Western Belorussia. Princeton: Princeton University Press, 1988; Expanded Edition.
- Koskodan, K. K. (2009). No Greater Ally: The Untold Story of Poland's Forces in World War II. Oxford: Osprey Publishing.
- McGilvray, E. (2022). First Polish Armoured Division 1938-47: A History. Barnsley: Pen and Sword Military.
- Murphy-Gemmill, L. M. (2017). "Poland Is Not Yet Lost": The Tadeusz Kościuszko Polish Armed Unit in Canada 1941–1942. The Polish Review, 62(4), 67–84.
- Peszke, M. A. (1980). A Synopsis of Polish-Allied Military Agreements during World War Two. Military Affairs, 44(3), 128–134.
- Peszke, M. A. (1981). The Polish Armed Forces in Exile: Part I. September 1939-July 1941. The Polish Review, 26(1), 67–113.
- Peszke, M. A. (1984). The Polish Parachute Brigade in World War Two: A Paradigm for the Polish Military in Exile. Military Affairs, 48(4), 188–193.
- Peszke, M. A. (1987). The Polish Armed Forces in Exile: Part 2 July 1941—May 1945. The Polish Review, 32(1), 33–69.
- Peszke, M. A. (1988). The Polish Government's Aid to and Liaison with Its Secret Army in Occupied Poland, 1939-1945. Military Affairs, 52(4), 197–202.
- Peszke, M. A. (1994). The Forgotten Campaign: Poland's Military Aviation in September, 1939. The Polish Review, 39(1), 51–72.
- Peszke, M. A. (2016). Poland's Military Aviation, September 1939: It Never Had a Chance. In R. Higham & S. J. Harris (Eds.), Why Air Forces Fail: The Anatomy of Defeat (2nd Ed., pp. 13–40). University Press of Kentucky.
- Sword, K. (Ed). (1991). The Soviet Takeover of the Polish Eastern Provinces, 1939–41. (Studies in Russia and East Europe). New York: Palgrave Macmillan.
- Toczewski, A. (1992). Cooperation Between the Soviet Union and the Third Reich in Exchanges of Polish Population and Prisoners of War in the Years 1939-1941. The Polish Review, 37(2), 209–215.
- Williamson, D. G. (2009). Poland Betrayed: The Nazi-Soviet Invasions of 1939. Barnsley: Pen and Sword Military.
- Zamoyski, A. (1995). The Forgotten Few: The Polish Air Force in the Second World War. New York: Hippocrene Books.

=== War crimes ===
For works about the Holocaust, please see #Holocaust in Poland.

- Cienciala, A. M., Lebedeva, N. S., & Materski, W. (Eds.). (2008). Katyn: A Crime Without Punishment. New Haven: Yale University Press.
- Mędykowski, W. W. (2018). Macht Arbeit Frei?: German Economic Policy and Forced Labor of Jews in the General Government, 1939-1943. Academic Studies Press.
- Tuszynski, M., & Denda, D. F. (1999). Soviet War Crimes Against Poland During The Second World War And Its Aftermath: A Review Of The Factual Record And Outstanding Questions. The Polish Review, 44(2), 183–216.
- Paul, A. (2010). Katyn: Stalin's Massacre and the Triumph of Truth. DeKalb: Northern Illinois University Press.
- Snyder, T. (1999). To Resolve the Ukrainian Problem Once and for All: The Ethnic Cleansing of Ukrainians in Poland, 1943–1947. Journal of Cold War Studies, 1(2), 86–120.
- Snyder, T. (2003). The Causes of Ukrainian-Polish Ethnic Cleansing 1943. Past & Present, 179, 197–234.
- Tuszynski, M., & Denda, D. F. (1999). Soviet War Crimes Against Poland during the Second World War and Its Aftermath: A Review of the Factual Record and Outstanding Questions. The Polish Review, 44(2), 183–216.
- Urban, T. (2020). The Katyn Massacre 1940: History of a Crime. Barnsley: Pen and Sword Military.
- Wheatcroft, S. G. (1996). The Scale and Nature of German and Soviet Repression and Mass Killings, 1930-45. Europe-Asia Studies, 48(8), 1319–1353.
- Wheatcroft, S. G. (2000). The Scale and Nature of Stalinist Repression and Its Demographic Significance: On Comments by Keep and Conquest. Europe-Asia Studies, 52(6), 1143–1159.
- Wierzbicki, M., & Rosenson, C. (2007). Polish–Jewish Relations in Vilna and the Region of Western Vilna under Soviet Occupation, 1939-1941. In M. B. Biskupski & A. Polonsky (Eds.), Polin: Studies in Polish Jewry Volume 19: Polish-Jewish Relations in North America (pp. 487–516). Liverpool University Press.
- Wróbel, P. J. (2014). Class War or Ethnic Cleansing? Soviet Deportations of Polish Citizens from the Eastern Provinces of Poland, 1939–1941. The Polish Review, 59(2), 19–42.
- Zamojski, J. E. (2001). The Social History of Polish Exile (1939–1945).: The Exile State and the Clandestine State: Society, Problems and Reflections. In M. Conway & J. Gotovitch (Eds.), Europe in Exile: European Exile Communities in Britain 1940-45 (1st Ed., pp. 183–212). Berghahn Books.

== Social ==
- Gross, J. (2019). Polish Society Under German Occupation: The Generalgouvernement, 1939-1944 (Princeton Legacy Library). Princeton: Princeton University Press.
- Gross, J. (2001). Neighbors: The Destruction of the Jewish Community in Jedwabne, Poland. Princeton: Princeton University Press.
- Piotrowski, T. (1997). Poland's Holocaust: Ethnic Strife, Collaboration with Occupying Forces and Genocide in the Second Republic, 1918-1947. Jefferson: McFarland & Company.
- Röger, M., & Ward, R. (2021). Wartime Relations: Intimacy, Violence, and Prostitution in Occupied Poland, 1939-1945. Oxford: Oxford University Press.
- Sword, K. (1994). Deportation and Exile: Poles in the Soviet Union, 1939–48. New York: Palgrave Macmillan.
- Zamojski, J. E. (2001). The Social History of Polish Exile (1939–1945): The Exile State and the Clandestine State: Society, Problems and Reflections. In M. Conway & J. Gotovitch (Eds.)., Europe in Exile: European Exile Communities in Britain 1940-45 (1st ed., pp. 183–212). London: Berghahn Books.

== Location histories ==
- Mick, C. (2011). Incompatible Experiences: Poles, Ukrainians and Jews in Lviv under Soviet and German Occupation, 1939-44. Journal of Contemporary History, 46(2), 336–363.

=== General Government ===
- Under construction

== Topical ==
- Cienciala, A. M. (1988). The Question of the Polish-Soviet Frontier in 1939–1940: the Litauer Memorandum and Sikorski's Proposals for Re-Establishing Polish-Soviet Relations. The Polish Review 33(3), 295–323.
- Grzebalkowska, M. (2020). Poland 1945: War and Peace (J. Markoff & M. Markoff, Trans.). Pittsburgh: University of Pittsburgh Press.
- Markiewicz, P. (2021). Unlikely Allies: Nazi German and Ukrainian Nationalist Collaboration in the General Government During World War II. West Lafayette: Purdue University Press.
- Moorhouse, R. (2020). Poland 1939: The Outbreak of World War II. New York: Basic Books.
- Pinchuk, B.-C. (1986). Cultural Sovietization in a Multi-Ethnic Environment: Jewish Culture in Soviet Poland, 1939-1941. Jewish Social Studies, 48(2), 163–174.

=== Collaboration ===
- Blum, A., Chopard, T., & Koustova, E. (2020). Survivors, Collaborators and Partisans?: Bringing Jewish Ghetto Policemen Before Soviet Justice in Lithuania. Jahrbücher Für Geschichte Osteuropa's, 68(2), 222–255.
- Connelly, J. (2005). Why the Poles Collaborated So Little: and Why That is No Reason for Nationalist Hubris. Slavic Review, 64(4), 771–781.
- Dean, M. (2005). Where Did All The Collaborators Go? Slavic Review, 64(4), 791–798.
- Dean, M. (2007). Poles in the German Local Police in Eastern Poland and Their Role in the Holocaust. In C. Freeze, P. Hyman, & A. Polonsky (Eds.), Polin: Studies in Polish Jewry Volume 18: Jewish Women in Eastern Europe (pp. 353–366). Liverpool University Press.
- Finder, G. N., & Prusin, A. V. (2008). Jewish Collaborators on Trial in Poland 1944–1956. In G. N. Finder, N. Aleksiun, A. Polonsky, & J. Schwarz (Eds.), Polin: Studies in Polish Jewry Volume 20: Making Holocaust Memory (pp. 122–148). Liverpool University Press.
- Friedrich, K.-P. (2005). Collaboration in a "Land Without a Quisling": Patterns of Cooperation with the Nazi German Occupation Regime in Poland during World War II. Slavic Review, 64(4), 711–746.

==== Trials and reprisals ====
- Finder, G. N., & Prusin, A. V. (2018). Justice Behind the Iron Curtain: Nazis on Trial in Communist Poland. University of Toronto Press.

=== Underground and resistance ===
- Armstrong, J. A. (1994). The Polish Underground and the Jews: A Reassessment of Home Army Commander Tadeusz Bór-Komorowski's Order 116 Against Banditry. Slavonic and East European Review, 72(2), 259–276.
- Garlinski, J. (1975). The Polish Underground State (1939-45). Journal of Contemporary History, 10(2), 219–259.
- Korboński, S. (1978). The Polish Underground State, 1939–1945. Boulder: East European Monographs.
- Kochanski, H. (2022). Resistance: The Underground War Against Hitler, 1939-1945. New York: W. W. Norton & Company.
- Nowożycki, B. (2016). Soldiers of the Home Army Group "Radosław" after the Fall of the Warsaw Uprising and the End of World War II. The Polish Review, 61(2), 45–65.
- Reynolds, J. (1981). "Lublin" Versus "London" - The Party and the Underground Movement in Poland, 1944-1945. Journal of Contemporary History, 16(4), 617–648.

==== Warsaw Uprising ====
- Chmielarz, A., & Kapolka, G. T. (1994). Warsaw Fought Alone: Reflections on Aid to and the Fall of the 1944 Uprising. The Polish Review, 39(4), 415–433.
- Ciechanowski, J. (2010). The Warsaw Rising of 1944 (Cambridge Russian, Soviet and Post-Soviet Studies). Cambridge: Cambridge University Press.
- Davies, N. (2003). Rising '44: The Battle For Warsaw. London: Macmillan.
- Lukas, R. C. (1975). The Big Three and the Warsaw Uprising. Military Affairs, 39(3), 129–135.
- Lukas, R. C. (1975). The RAF and the Warsaw Uprising. Aerospace Historian, 22(4), 188–194.
- Richie, A. (2013). Warsaw 1944: Hitler, Himmler, and the Warsaw Uprising. New York: Farrar, Straus and Giroux.
- Lichten, J. L. (1968). The Uprising of the Warsaw Ghetto: The Legend of Yesterday and the Reality of Today. The Polish Review, 13(2), 47–57.

=== Émigrés and refugees ===
- Habielski, R. (2010). Democratic Thought and Action Among the Polish Political Émigrés, 1939–89. In M. B. B. Biskupski, J. S. Pula, & P. J. Wróbel (Eds.), The Origins of Modern Polish Democracy (1st Ed., pp. 190–213). Ohio University Press.
- Hilton, L. (2009). Cultural Nationalism in Exile: The Case of Polish and Latvian Displaced Persons. The Historian, 71(2), 280–317.

== Foreign relations ==
- Biskupski, M. B. (1999). Canada and the Creation of a Polish Army, 1914-1918. The Polish Review, 44(3), 339–380.
- Cienciala, A. M. (1994). The Diplomatic Background Of The Warsaw Uprising Of 1944: The Players And The Stakes. The Polish Review, 39(4), 393–413.
- Cienciala, A. M. (2001). The Polish Government's Policy On the Polish-Soviet Frontier in World War II as Viewed by American, British and Canadian Historians. The Polish Review, 46(1), 3–26.
- Lukas, R. C. (1975). The Big Three and the Warsaw Uprising. Military Affairs, 39(3), 129–135.
- Peszke, M. A. (1980). A Synopsis of Polish-Allied Military Agreements during World War Two. Military Affairs, 44(3), 128–134.
- Prazmowska, A. J. (1986). Poland's Foreign Policy: September 1938 - September 1939. The Historical Journal, 29(4), 853–873.
- Sharp, T. (1977). The Origins of the "Teheran Formula" on Polish Frontiers. Journal of Contemporary History, 12(2), 381–393.

=== Government in exile ===
- Coutouvidis, J. (1984). Lewis Namier and the Polish Government-in-Exile, 1939-40. The Slavonic and East European Review, 62(3), 421–428.
- Korga, I. D. (2007). The Information Policy of the Polish Government-in-Exile Toward the American Public During World War II. Polish American Studies, 64(1), 27–45.
- Peszke, M. A. (1988). The Polish Government's Aid to and Liaison with Its Secret Army in Occupied Poland, 1939-1945. Military Affairs, 52(4), 197–202.
- Prazmowska, A. J. (2013). Anticipation of Civil War: The Polish Government in Exile and the Threat Posed by the Communist Movement During the Second World War. Journal of Contemporary History, 48(4), 717–741.
- Reynolds, J. (1981). "Lublin" Versus "London" - The Party and the Underground Movement in Poland, 1944-1945. Journal of Contemporary History, 16(4), 617–648.
- Schwonek, M. R. (2006). Kazimierz Sosnkowski as Commander in Chief: The Government-in-Exile and Polish Strategy, 1943-1944. The Journal of Military History, 70(3), 743–780.

=== American-Polish relations ===
- Biskupski, M. B. B. (2002). Hollywood and Poland, 1939-1945: The American Cinema And The Poles During World War II. The Polish Review, 47(2), 183–210.
- Cienciala, A. M. (2009). The United States and Poland in World War II. The Polish Review, 54(2), 173–194.
- Cienciala, A. M. (2009). The United States and Poland in World War II. The Polish Review, 54(2), 173–194.
- Fels, B. E. (2003). "Whatever Your Heart Dictates and Your Pocket Permits": Polish-American Aid to Polish Refugees during World War II. Journal of American Ethnic History, 22(2), 3–30.
- Januszewski, D. G. (1986). The Case for the Polish Exile Government in the American Press, 1939-1945. Polish American Studies, 43(1), 57–97.
- Korga, I. D. (2007). The Information Policy of the Polish Government-In-Exile Toward the American Public during World War II. Polish American Studies, 64(1), 27–45.
- Larsh, W. (1995). Yalta and the American Approach to Free Elections in Poland. The Polish Review, 40(3), 267–280.
- Szymczak, R. (1999). Uneasy Observers: The OSS Foreign Nationalities Branch and Perceptions of Polish Nationalism in the United States During World War II. Polish American Studies, 56(1), 7–73.

=== British-Polish relations ===
- Cienciala, A. M. (1995). Great Britain And Poland Before And After Yalta (1943-1945): A Reassessment. The Polish Review, 40(3), 281–313.
- Lukas, R. C. (1975). The RAF and the Warsaw Uprising. Aerospace Historian, 22(4), 188–194.
- Nocon, A. (1996). A Reluctant Welcome? Poles in Britain in the 1940s. Oral History, 24(1), 79–87.
- Prazmowska, A. (2009). Britain, Poland and the Eastern Front, 1939 (Cambridge Russian, Soviet and Post-Soviet Studies). Cambridge: Cambridge University Press.
- Prazmowska, A. (2009). Britain and Poland 1939-1943: The Betrayed Ally (Cambridge Russian, Soviet and Post-Soviet Studies). Cambridge: Cambridge University Press.
- Stirling, T., Nalęcz, D., & Dubicki, T. (Eds.). (2005). Intelligence Co-Operation Between Poland and Great Britain During World War II: The Report Of The Anglo-Polish Historical Committee (Government Official History Series). London: Vallentine Mitchell.
- Strang, G. B. (1996). Once More unto the Breach: Britain's Guarantee to Poland, March 1939. Journal of Contemporary History, 31(4), 721–752.
- Sword, K., Davies, N., & Ciechanowski, J. (1989). The Formation of the Polish Community in Great Britain, 1939–1950. London: University of London.
- Sword, K. (1991). British Reactions to the Soviet Occupation of Eastern Poland in September 1939. The Slavonic and East European Review, 69(1), 81–101.

=== German-Polish relations ===
- Halloway, R. (2021). Germany, Poland, and the Danzig Question, 1937–1939. London: Hamilton Books.
- Huener, J. (2014). Nazi Kirchenpolitik and Polish Catholicism in the Reichsgau Wartheland, 1939-1941. Central European History, 47(1), 105–137.
- Weinberg, G. L. (1975). German Foreign Policy and Poland, 1937-38. The Polish Review, 20(1), 5–23.

=== Soviet-Polish relations ===
- Cienciala, A. M. (1985). The Activities of Polish Communists as a Source for Stalin's Policy Towards Poland in the Second World War. The International History Review, 7(1), 129–145.
- Cienciala, A. M. (1988). The Question of the Polish-Soviet Frontier in 1939–1940 (The Litauer Memorandum and Sikorski's Proposals for Re-Establishing Polish-Soviet Relations). The Polish Review, 33(3), 295–323.
- Cienciala, A. M. (1996). General Sikorski And The Conclusion Of The Polish-Soviet Agreement Of July 30, 1941: A Reassessment. The Polish Review, 41(4), 401–434.
- Kaczorowska, T. (2022). The Augustow Roundup of July 1945: Accounts of the Brutal Soviet Repression of Polish Resistance (B. U. Zaremba, Ed.; H. Koralewski, Trans.). Jefferson: McFarland & Company.
- Moorhouse, R. (2014). The Devils' Alliance. Hitler's Pact with Stalin, 1939–1941. New York: Basic Books.
- Orzell, L. (1976). Poland and Russia, July 1941-April 1943: The "Impossible" Alliance. The Polish Review, 21(4), 35–58.
- Pinchuk, B. C. (1978). The Sovietization of the Jewish Community of Eastern Poland 1939-1941. Slavonic and East European Review, 56(3), 387–410.
- Raack, R. C. (1990). Stalin Fixes the Oder-Neisse Line. Journal of Contemporary History, 25(4), 467–488.
- Raack, R. C. (1991). Stalin's Plans for World War II. Journal of Contemporary History, 26(2), 215–227.
- Raack, R. C. (1993). Stalin Plans His Post-War Germany. Journal of Contemporary History, 28(1), 53–73.
- Reynolds, D. (2002). From World War to Cold War: The Wartime Alliance and Post-War Transitions, 1941-1947. The Historical Journal, 45(1), 211–227.
- Roberts, G. (2006). Stalin's Wars: From World War to Cold War, 1939-1953. Yale University Press.
- Rotfeld, A. D., & Torkunov, A. V. (Eds.). (2015). White Spots—Black Spots: Difficult Matters in Polish-Russian Relations, 1918–2008. University of Pittsburgh Press.
- Sanford, G. (2006). The Katyn Massacre and Polish-Soviet Relations, 1941-43. Journal of Contemporary History, 41(1), 95–111.

== Other works ==
- Kornat, M. (2009). Choosing Not to Choose in 1939: Poland's Assessment of the Nazi-Soviet Pact. The International History Review, 31(4), 771–797.
- Tighe, C. (1996). The Polish Writing Profession: 1944-56. Contemporary European History, 5(1), 71–101.

== Biographies ==
Biographies about Poles of all backgrounds and beliefs and victims of the Holocaust in Poland:

- Biskupski, M. B. (1998). Spy, Patriot or Internationalist? The Early Career of Józef Retinger, Polish Patriarch of European Union. The Polish Review, 43(1), 23–67.

== Historiography and memory studies ==
- Crowley, D. (2011). Memory in Pieces: The Symbolism of the Ruin in Warsaw after 1944. Journal of Modern European History 9(3), 351–372.
- Jażborowska, I. (2008). Russian Historical Writing About The Crime Of Katyn. The Polish Review, 53(2), 139–157.
- Kassow, S. D. (2018). Who Will Write Our History?: Emanuel Ringelblum, the Warsaw Ghetto, and the Oyneg Shabes Archive (The Helen and Martin Schwartz Lectures in Jewish Studies). Bloomington: Indiana University Press.
- Madajczyk, P. (2013). Experience and Memory: The Second World War in Poland. In J. Echternkamp & S. Martens (Eds.), Experience and Memory: The Second World War in Europe. New York: Berghahn Books.
- Muller, A., & Logemann, D. (2017). War, Dialogue, and Overcoming the Past: The Second World War Museum in Gdansk, Poland. The Public Historian, 39(3), 85–95.
- Paul, A. (2010). Katyn: Stalin's Massacre and the Triumph of Truth. DeKalb: Northern Illinois University Press.
- Steffen, K., & Güttel, A. (2008). Disputed Memory: Jewish Past, Polish Remembrance. Osteuropa, 58(8/10), 199–217.
- Szymczak, R. (2008). The Vindication of Memory: The Katyn Case in the West, Poland, and Russia, 1952-2008. The Polish Review, 53(4), 419–443.
- Wawrzyniak, J., & Lewis, S. (2015). Veterans, Victims, and Memory: The Politics of the Second World War In Communist Poland (New Edition). Peter Lang.

== Holocaust in Poland ==
- Browning, C. (1992). Ordinary Men: Reserve Police Battalion 101 and the Final Solution in Poland. New York: HarperCollins.
- Dean, M. (2005). Where Did All The Collaborators Go? Slavic Review, 64(4), 791–798.
- Dean, M. (2007). Poles in the German Local Police in Eastern Poland and Their Role in the Holocaust. In C. Freeze, P. Hyman, & A. Polonsky (Eds.), Polin: Studies in Polish Jewry Volume 18: Jewish Women in Eastern Europe (pp. 353–366). Liverpool University Press.
- Engel, D. (1983). An Early Account of Polish Jewry Under Nazi and Soviet Occupation Presented to the Polish Government-in-Exile, February 1940. Jewish Social Studies, 45(1), 1–16.
- Engel, D. (2021). The Holocaust: The Third Reich and the Jews. London: Routledge.
- Friedman, J. C. (Ed.). (2010). The Routledge History of the Holocaust. London: Routledge.
- Gigliotti, S. (2010). The Train Journey: Transit, Captivity, and Witnessing in the Holocaust. New York: Berghahn Books.
- Gilbert, M. (1986). The Holocaust: The Human Tragedy. New York: Henry Holt & Co.
- Haltof, M. (2012). Polish Film and the Holocaust: Politics and Memory. Berghahn Books.
- Henry, P. (Ed.). (2014). Jewish Resistance Against the Nazis. Catholic University of America Press.
- Kay, A. J. (2021). Empire of Destruction: A History of Nazi Mass Killing. New Haven: Yale University Press.
- Kornbluth, A. (2021). The August Trials: The Holocaust and Postwar Justice in Poland. Cambridge: Harvard University Press.
- Lucas, R. C. (1990). Forgotten Holocaust: The Poles under German Occupation 1939–1944. New York: Hippocrene Books.
- Mędykowski, W. W. (2018). Macht Arbeit Frei?: German Economic Policy and Forced Labor of Jews in the General Government, 1939-1943. Academic Studies Press.
- Nasierowski, T. (2006). In the Abyss of Death: The Extermination of the Mentally Ill in Poland During World War II. International Journal of Mental Health, 35(3), 50–61.
- Skibińska, A., Szurek, J.-C., Zapalec, A., Panz, K., Frydel, T., & Swałtek-Niewińska, D. (2022). Night without End: The Fate of Jews in German-Occupied Poland (J. Grabowski & B. Engelking, Eds.). Bloomington: Indiana University Press.

=== Location histories ===
- Baxter, I. (2021). The Ghettos of Nazi-Occupied Poland: Rare Photographs from Wartime Archives. Barnsley: Pen & Sword Military.
- Blatman, D. (2006). The Encounter between Jews and Poles in Lublin District after Liberation, 1944-1945. East European Politics and Societies, 20(4), 598–621.
- Kershaw, I. (1992). Improvised Genocide? The Emergence of the "Final Solution" in the "Warthegau." Transactions of the Royal Historical Society, 2, 51–78.
- Naimark, N. M. (2002). The Nazis and "The East": Jedwabne's Circle of Hell. Slavic Review, 61(3), 476–482.
- Nowak, J., & Brzezinski, Z. (1982). Courier from Warsaw. Detroit: Wayne State University Press.
- Paulsson, G. S. (2003). Secret City: The Hidden Jews of Warsaw, 1940-1945. New Haven: Yale University Press.
- Wierzbicki, M., & Rosenson, C. (2007). Polish–Jewish Relations in Vilna and the Region of Western Vilna under Soviet Occupation, 1939-1941. In M. B. Biskupski & A. Polonsky (Eds.), Polin: Studies in Polish Jewry Volume 19: Polish-Jewish Relations in North America (pp. 487–516). Liverpool University Press.

==== Geography ====
- Barnes, T. J., & Minca, C. (2013). Nazi Spatial Theory: The Dark Geographies of Carl Schmitt and Walter Christaller. Annals of the Association of American Geographers, 103(3), 669–687.
- Beorn, W., Cole, T., Gigliotti, S., Giordano, A., Holian, A., Jaskot, P. B., Knowles, A. K., Masurovsky, M., & Steiner, E. B. (2009). Geographies of the Holocaust. Geographical Review, 99(4), 563–574.
- Steiner, E. B. (2014). Geographies of the Holocaust (A. K. Knowles, T. Cole, & A. Giordano, Eds.). Bloomington: Indiana University Press.

==== Ghettos ====
- Adelson, A. & R. L. (1989). Łódź Ghetto: Inside a Community Under Siege. New York: Viking Press.
- Blum, A., Chopard, T., & Koustova, E. (2020). Survivors, Collaborators and Partisans?: Bringing Jewish Ghetto Policemen Before Soviet Justice in Lithuania. Jahrbücher Für Geschichte Osteuropa's, 68(2), 222–255.
- Einwohner, R. L. (2009). The Need to Know: Cultured Ignorance and Jewish Resistance in the Ghettos of Warsaw, Vilna, and Łódź. The Sociological Quarterly, 50(3), 407–430.
- Lisner, W. (2020). Midwifery under German Occupation in the Litzmannstadt Ghetto and in Western Poland. Nashim: A Journal of Jewish Women's Studies & Gender Issues, 36, 86–116.
- Sierakowiak, D. (2013). Notebooks from the Łódź Ghetto (1942). In A. Rabinbach & S. L. Gilman (Eds.), The Third Reich Sourcebook' (1st ed., pp. 775–776). Berkeley: University of California Press.
- Sznapman, S. (2013). Warsaw Ghetto Diary (1943). In A. Rabinbach & S. L. Gilman (Eds.), The Third Reich Sourcebook' (1st ed., pp. 776–778). Berkeley: University of California Press.
- Tiedens, L. Z. (1997). Optimism and Revolt of the Oppressed: A Comparison of Two Polish Jewish Ghettos of World War II. Political Psychology, 18(1), 45–69.

==== Camps ====
- Arad, Y. (1987). Belzec, Sobibor, Treblinka: The Operation Reinhard Death Camps. Bloomington: Indiana University Press.
- Garlinski, J., Polonsky, A., & Foot, M. R. D. (2018). Fighting Auschwitz: The Resistance Movement in the Concentration Camp. Los Angeles: Aquila Polonica.

==== Transportation ====
- Under construction

=== Gender and family ===
- Lisner, W. (2020). Midwifery under German Occupation in the Litzmannstadt Ghetto and in Western Poland. Nashim: A Journal of Jewish Women's Studies & Gender Issues, 36, 86–116.

=== Holocaust related biographies ===
- Under construction

=== Other studies ===
- Grodin, M. A. (Ed.). (2014). Jewish Medical Resistance in the Holocaust. New York: Berghahn Books.

=== Holocaust historiography and memory studies ===
- Ben-Sasson, Havi (2017). Relations Between Jews and Poles During the Holocaust: The Jewish Perspective. Jerusalem: Yad Vashem. ISBN 978-965-308-524-4.
- Biskupska, Jadwiga (January 27, 2022). "Chapter 7 - Matters of Faith — Catholic Intelligentsia and the Church". Survivors: Warsaw Under Nazi Occupation (Hardcover) (New ed.). Cambridge University Press. pp. 192–225. doi:10.1017/9781009026017.008. ISBN 978-1-316-51558-7.
- Feierstein, D., & Town, D. A. (2014). Discourse and Politics in Holocaust Studies: Uniqueness, Comparability, and Narration. In Genocide as Social Practice: Reorganizing Society under the Nazis and Argentina's Military Juntas (pp. 71–86). Rutgers University Press.
- Hirsch, M., & Spitzer, L. (2010). The Witness in the Archive: Holocaust Studies/Memory Studies. In S. Radstone & B. Schwarz (Eds.), Memory: Histories, Theories, Debates (pp. 390–405). Fordham University Press.
- Hudzik, J. P. (2020). Reflections on German and Polish Historical Policies of Holocaust Memory. The Polish Review, 65(4), 36–59.
- Kucia, M. (2015). Auschwitz in the Perception of Contemporary Poles. Polish Sociological Review, 190, 191–206.
- LaCapra, D. (1994). Representing the Holocaust: History, Theory, Trauma. Cornell University Press.
- Libowitz, R. (1990). Holocaust Studies. Modern Judaism, 10(3), 271–281.
- Littell, F. H. (1980). Fundamentals in Holocaust Studies. The Annals of the American Academy of Political and Social Science, 450, 213–217.
- Michman, D. (2018). Historiography on the Holocaust in Poland: An Outsider's View of its Place within Recent General Developments in Holocaust Historiography. In A. Polonsky, H. Węgrzynek, & A. Żbikowski (Eds.), New Directions in the History of the Jews in the Polish Lands (pp. 386–401). New York: Academic Studies Press.
- Rittner, C., & Roth, J. K. (2020). Advancing Holocaust Studies. London: Routledge.
- Tyndorf, Ryszard; Zieliński, Zygmunt (2023). Wartime Rescue of Jews by the Polish Catholic Clergy: The Testimony of Survivors and Rescuers (PDF). Vol. 1. Lublin: Wydawnictwo KUL. ISBN 978-83-8288-040-3. — Free downloadable book.
- Tyndorf, Ryszard; Zieliński, Zygmunt (2023). Wartime Rescue of Jews by the Polish Catholic Clergy: The Testimony of Survivors and Rescuers (PDF). Vol. 2. Lublin: Wydawnictwo KUL. ISBN 978-83-8288-088-5. — Free downloadable book.

==== Memory studies ====
- Haltof, M. (2012). Polish Film and the Holocaust: Politics and Memory. Berghahn Books.
- Kapralski, S. (2017). Jews and the Holocaust in Poland's Memoryscapes: an Inquiry Into Transcultural Amnesia. In T. S. Andersen & B. Törnquist-Plewa (Eds.), The Twentieth Century in European Memory (pp. 170–197). Leiden: Brill.
- Langenbacher, E. (2010). Collective Memory and German–Polish Relations. In E. Langenbacher & Y. Shain (Eds.), Power and the Past: Collective Memory and International Relations (pp. 71–96). Georgetown University Press.
- Steffen, K., & Güttel, A. (2008). Disputed Memory: Jewish Past, Polish Remembrance. Osteuropa, 58(8/10), 199–217.

== Other ==
- Bergen, D. L. (2008). Instrumentalization of Volksdeutschen in German Propaganda in 1939: Replacing/Erasing Poles, Jews, and Other Victims. German Studies Review, 31(3), 447–470.
- Bilska-Wodecka, E., Jackowski, A., Sołjan, I., Liro, J. (2022). Polish geography and Polish geographers under Nazi occupation. Journal of Historical Geography, 75 1–13.
- Gross, M. H. (2013). Reclaiming the Nation: Polish Schooling in Exile during the Second World War. History of Education Quarterly, 53(3), 233–254.
- Kornat, M. (2009). Choosing Not to Choose in 1939: Poland's Assessment of the Nazi-Soviet Pact. The International History Review, 31(4), 771–797.
- Röger, M. (2014). The Sexual Policies and Sexual Realities of the German Occupiers in Poland in the Second World War. Contemporary European History, 23(1), 1–21.

== Reference works ==
- Hayes, P., & Roth, J. K. (2011). The Oxford Handbook of Holocaust Studies. Oxford University Press.

== English language primary sources ==
=== War ===
- Poland, Germany, and Danzig. (May 20, 1939). Bulletin of International News, Royal Institute of International Affairs; 16(10), 3–13.
- Mr. Chamberlain's Review of the Danzig Question. (Jul. 15, 1939). Bulletin of International News, Royal Institute of International Affairs; 16(14), 11–12.
- Danzig, Germany, and Poland. (Aug. 26, 1939). Bulletin of International News, Royal Institute of International Affairs; 16(17), 12–18.
- Noakes, J., & Pridham, G. (Eds.). (2001). The German Occupation of Poland. In Nazism 1919–1945 Volume 3: Foreign Policy, War and Racial Extermination: A Documentary Reader (pp. 314–388). Liverpool University Press.

=== Holocaust ===
- Katz, S. T. (1999). Documents on the Holocaust: Selected Sources on the Destruction of the Jews of Germany and Austria, Poland, and the Soviet Union (Y. Gutman, Y. Arad, & A. Margaliot, Eds.; L. B. Dor, Trans.; 8th edition). Lincoln: University of Nebraska Press.

=== Memoirs and diaries ===
- Browning, C. R., Hollander, R. S., & Tec, N. (Eds.). (2007). Every Day Lasts a Year: A Jewish Family's Correspondence from Poland. Cambridge: Cambridge University Press.
- Dembowski, P. (2015). Memoirs Red and White: Poland, the War, and After. Notre Dame: University of Notre Dame Press.
- Reicher, E., & Bizouard-Reicher, E. (2013). Country of Ash: A Jewish Doctor in Poland, 1939-1945 (M. Bogin, Trans.). New York: Bellevue Literary Press.

== Academic journals ==
- Journal of Borderlands Studies (1986–present); five issues per year published by Taylor & Francis for the Association for Borderlands Studies; ISSN 0886-5655 (print), ISSN 2159-1229 (online).
- The Polish Review (1942–1945, 1956–2019); (Note: Previously published as Bulletin of the Polish Institute of Arts and Sciences in America from 1942–1945.) published by The Polish Institute of Arts and Sciences of America and University of Illinois Press; ISSN 0032-2970 (print), ISSN 2330-0841 (online).

== See also ==
- Bibliography of Russian history
- Bibliography of the Soviet Union (disambiguation)
- Bibliography of Ukrainian history
