= Bibliography of the history of Poland =

This is a select bibliography of English language books (including translations) and journal articles about the history of Poland. This bibliography specifically excludes non-history related works and self-published books.

Works listed here are cited in the notes or bibliographies of scholarly sources. Each is published by an academic or major press, written by a recognized expert, or substantially reviewed in scholarly journals; borderline cases are omitted. A selection of primary sources are included. Many of the books below carry their own bibliographies; see the Further reading section for other bibliographies, and the External links section for historical sites, academic sites, and museums.

Citations follow APA style. (Note: Entries are in plain text APA 7 format without templates; templates are used only for reviews and notes.) Book have citations to academic journal or mainstream published reviews when available. For books only partly about the subject, relevant chapter or section titles are provided when useful and available. Translators of the original-language edition are included when possible. In cases where a title or name has appeared with more than one English spelling, the most recent published form is used and a footnote documents any earlier title under which the work appeared.

== General surveys ==
- Biskupski, M. B. B. (2018). The History of Poland. Westport: Greenwood Publishing.
- Connelly, J. (2020). From Peoples into Nations: A History of Eastern Europe. Princeton: Princeton University Press.
- Dabrowski, P. M. (2016). Poland: The First Thousand Years. DeKalb: Northern Illinois University Press.
- Davies, N. (1982/1983). God's Playground: A History of Poland (2 vols.). New York: Columbia University Press.
- Davies, N. (2001). Heart of Europe: A Short History of Poland. Oxford: Oxford University Press.
- Leslie, R. (2009). The History of Poland Since 1863 (Cambridge Russian, Soviet and Post-Soviet Studies). Cambridge: Cambridge University Press.
- Lukowski, J., & Zawadzki, H. (2019). A Concise History of Poland (3rd ed.). Cambridge: Cambridge University Press.
- Prażmowska, A. (2004). A History of Poland. New York: Palgrave Macmillan.
- Prażmowska, A. (2010). Poland: A Modern History. London: I.B. Tauris.
- Stachura, P. D. (1999). Poland in the Twentieth Century. New York: St. Martin's Press.
- Watt, R. M. (1979). Bitter Glory: Poland and Its Fate. New York: Simon & Schuster.
- Zamoyski, A. (1989). The Polish Way: A Thousand Years' History of the Poles and their Culture. New York: Hippocrene Books.
- Zamoyski, A. (2009). Poland: A History. New York: Hippocrene Books.
- Cambridge History (1951). Cambridge history of Poland (Vols. 1–2). London: Cambridge

== Regional surveys ==
This sections contains works about Central and Eastern Europe (Note: This article uses the United Nations definition for the Central and Eastern Europe geographic regions.) with significant content about Poland; for specific areas within Poland, please see Area studies.

- Applebaum, A. (2013). Iron Curtain. The Crushing of Eastern Europe 1944–56. New York: Penguin.
- Bartlett, R. (1993). The Making of Europe: Conquest, Colonization and Cultural Change 950–1350. Princeton: Princeton University Press.
- Bartov, O. (2008). Eastern Europe as the Site of Genocide. The Journal of Modern History, 80(3), 557–93.
- Berend, N., Urbańczyk, P., & Wiszewski, P. (2014). Central Europe in the High Middle Ages: Bohemia, Hungary and Poland, c.900–c.1300. Cambridge: Cambridge University Press.
- Bilenky, S. (2012). Romantic Nationalism in Eastern Europe: Russian, Polish, and Ukrainian Political Imaginations (Stanford Studies on Central and Eastern Europe). Palo Alto: Stanford University Press.
- Brown, J. (1991). Surge to Freedom: The End of Communist Rule in Eastern Europe (Soviet & East European Studies). Durham: Duke University Press.
- Dawisha, K. (1990). Eastern Europe, Gorbachev and Reform, the Great Challenge. Cambridge: Cambridge University Press.
- Dolukhanov, P. (2016). The Early Slavs: Eastern Europe from the Initial Settlement to the Kievan Rus. London: Routledge.I
- Fedorowicz, J. K. (Ed.). (1982). A Republic of Nobles: Studies in Polish History to 1864. Cambridge: Cambridge University Press.
- Feffer, J. (2017). Aftershock: A Journey into Eastern Europe's Broken Dreams. New York: Bloomsbury Academic.
- Hoffman, E. (1993). Exit into History: A Journey Through the New Eastern Europe. New York: Viking Press.
- Howard, A. (Ed.). (1993). Constitution Making in Eastern Europe. Washington, D.C.: Woodrow Wilson Center Press.
- Kaser, M. C., & Radice, E. (Eds.). (1986). The Economic History of Eastern Europe 1919–1975 (2 vols.). Oxford: Oxford University Press.
- Kenney, P. P. (2002). A Carnival of Revolution: Central Europe 1989. Princeton University Press.
- Kenney, P. P. (2013). The Burdens of Freedom: Eastern Europe since 1989 (Global History of the Present). London: Zed Books.
- Kirby, D. (1995). The Baltic World, 1772–1993. Europe's Northern Periphery in an Age of Change. London: Routledge.
- Kirby, D. (1990). Northern Europe in the Early Modern Period: The Baltic World 1492–1772. London: Longman.
- Komarnicki, T. (1957). The Rebirth of the Polish Republic: A Study in the Diplomatic History of Europe, 1914–1920. London: William Heinemann.
- Magocsi, P. (1996). A History of Ukraine. Toronto: Toronto University Press.
- Subtelny, O. (1988). Ukraine: A History. Toronto: Toronto University Press.
- Frost, R. (2015). The Northern Wars: War, State and Society in North-Eastern Europe 1558–1721. London: Routledge.
- Fuhrmann, H. (1986). Germany in the High Middle Ages c. 1050–1200. Cambridge: Cambridge University Press.
- Geremek, B. (1996). The Common Roots of Europe. Cambridge: Polity Press.
- Mączak, A. (1985). Samsonowicz, H. and Burke, P. (Eds.). East-Central Europe in Transition: from the Fourteenth to the Seventeenth Centuries (Past and Present Publications). Cambridge: Cambridge University Press.
- Plokhy, S. (2015). The Gates of Europe: A History of Ukraine. New York: Basic Books.
- Rothschild, J. (2007). Return to Diversity: A Political History of East Central Europe Since World War II (4th ed.). Oxford: Oxford University Press.
- Rowell, S. (2014). Lithuania Ascending: A Pagan Empire Within East-Central Europe, 1295–1345 (Cambridge Studies in Medieval Life and Thought). Cambridge: Cambridge University Press.
- Sedlar, J. (2015). East Central Europe in the Middle Ages 1000–1500. Seattle: University of Washington Press.
- Senn, A. E. (1990). Awakening Lithuania: A Study on the Rise of Modern Lithuanian Nationalism. Madison, NJ: Florham Park Press.
- Shore, M. (2013). The Taste of Ashes: The Afterlife of Totalitarianism in Eastern Europe. New York: Crown Publishing Group.
- Snyder, T. (2004). The Reconstruction of Nations: Poland, Ukraine, Lithuania, Belarus, 1569–1999. New Haven: Yale University Press.
- Subtelny, O. (1986). Domination of Eastern Europe: Native Nobilities and Foreign Absolutism, 1500–1715. Montreal: Mcgill-Queen's University Press.
- Wandycz, P. (2017). The Price of Freedom: A History of East Central Europe from the Middle Ages to the Present. London: Routledge.
- Ther, P. (2016). Europe Since 1989: A History (C. Hughes-Kreutzmüller, Trans.). Princeton: Princeton University Press.
- Weeks, T. R. (2015). Vilnius between Nations 1795–2000 (Illustrated ed.) (NIU Series in Slavic, East European, and Eurasian Studies). De Kalb: Northern Illinois University Press.
- Wolff, L. (1994). Inventing Eastern Europe: The Map of Civilization on the Mind of the Enlightenment. Palo Alto: Stanford University Press.

=== Borderlands studies ===
- Budurowycz, B. (1983). Poland and the Ukrainian Problem, 1921–1939. Canadian Slavonic Papers / Revue Canadienne Des Slavistes, 25(4), 473–500.
- Davies, B. (2007). Warfare, State and Society on the Black Sea Steppe, 1500–1700.
- Dabrowski, P. M. (2021). The Carpathians: Discovering the Highlands of Poland and Ukraine (NIU Series in Slavic, East European, and Eurasian Studies). DeKalb: Northern Illinois University Press.
- Kaminski, A. S. (1993). Republic vs. Autocracy Poland-Lithuania and Russia 1686–1697 (Harvard Series In Ukrainian Studies). Cambridge: Harvard Ukrainian Research Institute.
- Marzec, W., & Turunen, R. (2018). Socialisms in the Tsarist Borderlands: Poland and Finland in a Contrastive Comparison, 1830–1907. Contributions to the History of Concepts, 13(1), 22–50.
- Rieber, A. J. (2014). The Struggle for the Eurasian Borderlands: From the Rise of Early Modern Empires to the End of the First World War. Cambridge: Cambridge University Press.
- Snyder, T. (2004). The Reconstruction of Nations: Poland, Ukraine, Lithuania, Belarus, 1569–1999. New Haven: Yale University Press.
- Snyder, T. (2010). Bloodlands: Europe Between Hitler and Stalin. New York: Basic Books.
- Staliūnas, D. (2007). Between Russification and Divide and Rule: Russian Nationality Policy in the Western Borderlands in mid-19th Century. Jahrbücher Für Geschichte Osteuropas, 55(3), 357–373.
- Staliūnas, D., & Aoshima, Y., (eds.). (2021). The Tsar, the Empire, and the Nation: Dilemmas of Nationalization in Russia's Western Borderlands, 1905–1915. Historical Studies in Eastern Europe and Eurasia. Budapest: Central European University Press.
- Thaden, E. (1984). Russia's Western Borderlands, 1710–1980, Princeton, N.J.: Princeton University Press.
- Ther, P., & Kreutzmüller, C. (2014). The Dark Side of Nation-States: Ethnic Cleansing in Modern Europe. New York: Berghahn Books.
- Von, H. & Herbert J. (2011). War in a European Borderland: Occupations and Occupation Plans in Galicia and Ukraine; 1914–1918. Seattle, WA: University of Washington.

== Prehistory ==
- Under construction

== Piast era ==
- Górecki, P. (1992). Economy, Society, and Lordship in Medieval Poland 1100–1250. New York: Holme and Meier.
- Górecki, P. (1993). Parishes, Tithes and Society in Earlier Medieval Poland c. 1100–c. 1250. Transactions of the American Philosophical Society, 83(2), i–146.
- Knoll, P. (1972). The Rise of the Polish Monarchy: Piast Poland in East Central Europe, 1320–1370. Chicago: University of Chicago Press.
- Manteuffel, T. (1982). The Formation of the Polish State: The Period of Ducal Rule, 963–1194. Detroit: Wayne State University Press.

== Jagiellonian era ==
- Under construction

== Polish–Lithuanian Commonwealth era ==
- Butterwick, R. (2021). The Polish-Lithuanian Commonwealth, 1733–1795: Light and Flame. New Haven: Yale University Press.
- Friedrich, K., & Pendzich, B. (2008). Citizenship and Identity in a Multinational Commonwealth: Poland-Lithuania in Context, 1550–1772 (Illustrated ed.) (Studies in Central European Histories). Leiden: Brill.
- Frost, R. I. (1993). After the Deluge: Poland-Lithuania and the Second Northern War 1655–1660. Cambridge: Cambridge University Press.
- Frost, R. I. (2015). The Oxford History of Poland-Lithuania: Volume I: The Making of the Polish-Lithuanian Union, 1385–1569. Oxford: Oxford University Press.
- Hundert, G. D. (2004). Jews in Poland-Lithuania in the Eighteenth Century: A Genealogy of Modernity. Berkeley: University of California Press.
- Kaminski, A. S. (1993). Republic vs. Autocracy: Poland-Lithuania and Russia, 1686–1697 (Harvard Series In Ukrainian Studies). Cambridge: Harvard Ukrainian Research Institute.
- Lukowski, J. (1991). Liberty's Folly: The Polish–Lithuanian Commonwealth in the Eighteenth Century. London: Routledge.
- Rosman, M. (1990). The Lords' Jews: Magnate–Jewish Relations in the Polish–Lithuanian Commonwealth During the Eighteenth Century. Cambridge: Harvard University Press.
- Stone, D. Z. (2001). The Polish-Lithuanian State, 1386–1795 (History of East Central Europe). Seattle: University of Washington Press.
- Korzon, T. (1897). Wewne̦trzne Dzieje Polski za stanisława Augusta (Vols. 1–6).
- Thomson, G. S. (1947). Catherine the Great and the Expansion of Russia.
- Grey, I. (1961). Catherine the Great.
- Bain, R. N. (1909) The last king of Poland: and his contemporaries.

== Partitioned Poland ==
- Akelev, E.V., & Gornostaev, A.V. (2023). Millions of Living Dead: Fugitives, the Polish Border, and 18th-Century Russian Society. Kritika: Explorations in Russian and Eurasian History 24(2), 269-297.
- Blobaum, R. E. (1995). Rewolucja: Russian Poland, 1904–1907. Ithaca: Cornell University Press.
- Kaplan, H. (1962). The First Partition of Poland. New York: Columbia University Press.
- Leslie, R. F. (1969). Polish Politics and the Revolution of November 1830. Westport: Greenwood Press.
- Leslie, R. F. (1970). Reform and Insurrection in Russian Poland 1856–1863. Westport: Praeger.
- Lukowski, J. (1999). The Partitions of Poland 1772, 1793, 1795. London: Longman.
- Porter, B. (2000). When Nationalism Began to Hate: Imagining Modern Politics in Nineteenth-Century Poland. Oxford: Oxford University Press.
- Rolf, M., & Klohr, C. (2021). Imperial Russian Rule in the Kingdom of Poland, 1864–1915. Pittsburgh: University of Pittsburgh Press.
- Staliūnas, D. (2007). Between Russification and Divide and Rule: Russian Nationality Policy in the Western Borderlands in mid-19th Century. Jahrbücher Für Geschichte Osteuropas, 55(3), 357–373.
- Thaden, E. C. (2016). Russia's Western Borderlands, 1710–1870 (Princeton Legacy Library). Princeton: Princeton University Press.
- Ury, S. (2012). Barricades and Banners: The Revolution of 1905 and the Transformation of Warsaw Jewry' (Stanford Studies in Jewish History and Culture). Palo Alto: Stanford University Press.
- Wandycz, P. (1975). The Lands of Partitioned Poland, 1795–1918. Seattle: University of Washington Press.
- Weeks, T. R. (1996). Nation and State in Late Imperial Russia: Nationalism and Russification on the Western Frontier, 1863–1914. DeKalb: Northern Illinois University Press.
- Zamoyski, A. (2000). Holy Madness: Romantics, Patriots and Revolutionaries 1776–1871. New York: Viking.
- Zamoyski, A. (2012). 1812: Napoleon's Fatal March on Moscow. New York: HarperPress.
- Zimmerman, J. D. (2003). Poles, Jews and the Politics of Nationality: The Bund and the Polish Socialist Party in Late Czarist Russia 1892–1914. Madison: University of Wisconsin Press.

== World War I ==
- Boysen, J. (2016). Imperial Service, Alienation, and an Unlikely National "Rebirth": The Poles in World War I. In G. Barry, E. Dal Lago, & R. Healy (Eds.), Small Nations and Colonial Peripheries in World War I. Leiden: Brill.
- Hagen, W. W. (2018). Anti-Jewish Violence in Poland, 1914–1920. Cambridge: Cambridge University Press.
- Hapak, J. T. (2016). Prelude to Arms: Polonia and the Struggle for Polish Independence in World War I. The Polish Review, 61(1), 81–89.
- Kauffman, J. (2015). Elusive Alliance: The German Occupation of Poland in World War I (Illustrated ed.). Cambridge: Harvard University Press.
- Latawski, P. (Ed.). (1992). The Reconstruction of Poland 1914–23. New York: Palgrave Macmillan.
- Stokłosa, K. (2018). Catholicism and Patriotism in Poland during the First World War. Kirchliche Zeitgeschichte, 31(1), 184–93.
- Watson, A. (2020). The Fortress: The Siege of Przemysl and the Making of Europe's Bloodlands. New York: Basic Books.
- Zimmerman, J. D. (2022). The Polish Legions and the Beginnings of World War I. In Jozef Pilsudski: Founding Father of Modern Poland (pp. 222–249). Harvard University Press.

=== Polish-Soviet War ===
- Borzecki, J. (2008). The Soviet–Polish Peace of 1921 and the Creation of Interwar Europe. New Haven: Yale University Press.
- Dąbrowski, S. (1960). The Peace Treaty of Riga. The Polish Review, 5(1), 3–34.
- Davies, N. (1975). The Missing Revolutionary War: The Polish Campaigns and the Retreat from Revolution in Soviet Russia, 1919–1921. Soviet Studies, 27(2), 178–195.
- Davies, N. (2003). White Eagle, Red Star: The Polish–Soviet War 1919–1920 and The Miracle on the Vistula. New York: Pimlico.
- Drobnicki, J. A. (1997). The Russo–Polish War, 1919–1920: A Bibliography of Materials in English. The Polish Review, 42(1), 95–104.
- Dziewanowski, M. K. (1981). Joseph Piłsudski, A European Federalist, 1918–1922. Palo Alto: Hoover Institution Press.
- Fiddick, T. C. (1990). Russia's Retreat from Poland, 1920: From Permanent Revolution to Peaceful Coexistence. New York: St Martin's Press.
- Latawski, P. (Ed.). (1992). The Reconstruction of Poland, 1914–1923. New York: Palgrave Macmillan.
- Neiberg, M. S. & Jordan, D. (2012). The Eastern Front 1914–1920: From Tannenberg to the Russo–Polish War. London: Amber Books.
- Wandycz, P. S. (1965). Secret Soviet–Polish Peace Talks in 1919. Slavic Review, 24(3), 425–449.
- Wandycz, P. S. (1969). Soviet–Polish Relations, 1917–1921. Cambridge: Harvard University Press.
- Wandycz, P. S. (2017). France and the Polish–Soviet War, 1919–1920. The Polish Review, 62(3), 3–15.
- Zamoyski, A. (2008). Warsaw 1920: Lenin's Failed Conquest of Europe. New York: HarperPress.

== Interwar ==
- Blanke, R. (1990). The German Minority in Inter–War Poland and German Foreign Policy. Journal of Contemporary History, 25(1), 87–102.
- Böhler, J. (2019). Civil War in Central Europe, 1918–1921: The Reconstruction of Poland. Oxford: Oxford University Press.
- Drzewieniecki, W. M. (1981). The Polish Army on the Eve of World War II. The Polish Review, 26(3), 54–64.
- Friedman, P. (1949). Polish Jewish Historiography between the Two Wars (1918–1939). Jewish Social Studies, 11(4), 373–408.
- Garboś, M. R. (2018). Revolution and the Defence of Civilization: Polish Visions of Nationhood, Property and Territory in Right-Bank Ukraine (1917–22). The Slavonic and East European Review, 96(3), 469–506.
- Gross, J. T. (1988). Revolution from Abroad: The Soviet Conquest of Poland's Western Ukraine and Western Belorussia (Expanded ed.). Princeton: Princeton University Press.
- Holzer, J. (1977). The Political Right in Poland, 1918–39. Journal of Contemporary History, 12(3), 395–412.
- Korbonski, A. (1988). Civil-Military Relations in Poland Between the Wars: 1918–1939. Armed Forces & Society, 14(2), 169–89.
- Kornat, M. (2009). Choosing Not to Choose in 1939: Poland's Assessment of the Nazi-Soviet Pact. The International History Review, 31(4), 771–97.
- Magowska, A. (2014). The Unwanted Heroes: War Invalids in Poland after World War I. Journal of the History of Medicine and Allied Sciences, 69(2), 185–220.
- Materski, W. (2000). The Second Polish Republic in Soviet Foreign Policy (1918–1939). The Polish Review, 45(3), 331–45.
- Moss, K. B. (2021). An Unchosen People: Jewish Political Reckoning in Interwar Poland. Cambridge: Harvard University Press.
- Plach, E. (2006). The Clash of Moral Nations: Cultural Politics in Pilsudski's Poland, 1926–1935 (Polish and Polish American Studies). Athens: Ohio University Press.
- Puchalski, P. (2021). Poland in a Colonial World Order: Adjustments and Aspirations, 1918–1939. (Routledge Histories of Central and Eastern Europe). London: Routledge.
- Rothschild, J. (1962). The Military Background of Pilsudski's Coup D'Etat. Slavic Review, 21(2), 241–60.
- Rothschild, J. (1974). East Central Europe between the Two World Wars (A History of East Central Europe). Seattle: University of Washington Press.
- Stachura, P. D. (Ed.). (1999). Poland between the Wars, 1918–1939. New York: St. Martin Press.
- Staniewicz, W. (1964). The Agrarian Problem in Poland between the Two World Wars. The Slavonic and East European Review, 43(100), 23–33.
- Veidlinger, J. (2021). In the Midst of Civilized Europe: The Pogroms of 1918–1921 and the Onset of the Holocaust. London: Picador.

== Communist Poland ==
- Babiracki, P. (2015). Soviet Soft Power in Poland: Culture and the Making of Stalin's New Empire, 1943–1957. Chapel Hill: The University of North Carolina Press.
- Basiuk, T., & Burszta, J. (Eds.). (2020). Queers in State Socialism: Cruising 1970s Poland. London: Routledge.
- Curp, T. D. (2006). A Clean Sweep?: The Politics of Ethnic Cleansing in Western Poland, 1945–1960 (Rochester Studies in East and Central Europe). Rochester: University of Rochester Press.
- Curry, J., & Fajfer, L. (Eds.). (1996). Poland's Permanent Revolution: Peoples vs. Elites, 1956–1990. Washington, D.C.: American University Press.
- Domber, G. F. (2014). Empowering Revolution: America, Poland, and the End of the Cold War. Chapel Hill: University of North Carolina Press.
- Fidelis, M. (2010). Women, Communism, and Industrialization in Postwar Poland. Cambridge: Cambridge University Press.
- Fidelis, M. (2022). Imagining the World from Behind the Iron Curtain: Youth and the Global Sixties in Poland. Oxford: Oxford University Press.
- Finder, G. N., & Prusin, A. V. (2008). Jewish Collaborators on Trial in Poland 1944–1956. In G. N. Finder, N. Aleksiun, A. Polonsky, & J. Schwarz (Eds.), Polin: Studies in Polish Jewry Volume 20: Making Holocaust Memory (pp. 122–48). Liverpool University Press.
- Finder, G. N., & Prusin, A. V. (2018). Justice Behind the Iron Curtain: Nazis on Trial in Communist Poland. University of Toronto Press.
- Huener, J. (2003). Auschwitz, Poland, and the Politics of Commemoration, 1945–1979 (Polish and Polish American Studies). Athens: Ohio University Press.
- Kemp-Welch, A. (2008). Poland under Communism. A Cold War History. Cambridge: Cambridge University Press.
- Kenney, P. (1997). Rebuilding Poland: Workers and Communists, 1945–1950. Ithaca: Cornell University Press.
- Kersten, K. (1991). The Establishment of Communist Rule in Poland, 1943–1948. Berkeley: University of California Press.
- Kornbluth, A. (2021). The August Trials: The Holocaust and Postwar Justice in Poland. Cambridge: Harvard University Press.
- Labedz, L. (Ed.). (1984). Poland under Jaruzelski. New York: Scribner.
- Lebow, K. A. (2013). Unfinished Utopia: Nowa Huta, Stalinism, and Polish Society, 1949–56. Ithaca: Cornell University Press.
- Lemańczyk, M. (2019). The Plight of German Residents of Post-War Poland and Their Identity Issues. The Polish Review, 64(2), 60–78.
- Lepak, K. J. (1988). Prelude to Solidarity: Poland and the Politics of the Gierek Regime. New York: Columbia University Press.
- Lipski, J. J. (1985). A History of Kor: The Committee for Workers' Self-Defence. Berkeley: University of California Press.
- Meng, M. (2011). Shattered Spaces: Encountering Jewish Ruins in Postwar Germany and Poland. Cambridge: Harvard University Press.
- Monticone, P. R. C. (1986). The Catholic Church in Communist Poland 1945–1985. Boulder: East European Monographs.
- Nomberg-Przytyk, S. (2022). Communist Poland: A Jewish Woman's Experience (H. Levitsky & J. Włodarczyk, Eds.; P. Parsky, Trans.) (Lexington Studies in Jewish Literature). London: Lexington Books.
- Plocker, A. (2022). The Expulsion of Jews from Communist Poland: Memory Wars and Homeland Anxieties. Bloomington: Indiana University Press.
- Rogalski, W. (2019). The Polish Resettlement Corps 1946–1949: Britain's Polish Forces. Warwick: Helion and Company.
- Stehle, H. (1965). The Independent Satellite: Society and Politics in Poland Since 1945. New York: Frederick A. Praeger.
- Szczerski, A. (2016). Global Socialist Realism: The Representation of Non-European Cultures in Polish Art of the 1950s. In J. Bazin, P. D. Glatigny, & P. Piotrowski (Eds.), Art beyond Borders: Artistic Exchange in Communist Europe (1945–1989) (pp. 439–52). Budapest: Central European University Press.
- Tismaneanu, V. (Ed.). (2009). Stalinism Revisited: The Establishment of Communist Regimes in East-Central Europe (New ed.). Central European University Press.
- Torańska, T. (1987). Oni: Stalin's Polish Puppets. New York: Random House.
- Will, J. E. (1984). Church and State in the Struggle for Human Rights in Poland. Journal of Law and Religion, 2(1), 153–76.
- Wojdon, J. (2012). The Impact of Communist Rule on History Education in Poland. Journal of Educational Media, Memory & Society, 4(1), 61–77.

=== Fall of communism and Solidarity ===
- Ascherson, N. (1982). The Polish August: The Self-Limiting Revolution. New York: Penguin Books.
- Bloom, J. M. (2014). Political Opportunity Structure, Contentious Social Movements, and State-Based Organizations: The Fight Against Solidarity Inside the Polish United Workers Party. Social Science History, 38(3–4), 359–88.
- Braun, K. (1993). The Underground Theater in Poland under Martial Law during the Last Years of Communism (1981–1989). The Polish Review, 38(2), 159–86.
- Garton Ash, T. (1990). The Magic Lantern: The Revolution of '89 Witnessed in Warsaw, Budapest, Berlin and Prague. New York: Random House.
- Garton Ash, T. (2002). The Polish Revolution: Solidarity (3rd ed.). New Haven: Yale University Press.
- Gompert, D. C., Binnendijk, H., & Lin, B. (2014). The Soviet Decision Not to Invade Poland, 1981. In Blinders, Blunders, and Wars: What America and China Can Learn (pp. 139–50). Rand Corporation.
- Hayden, J. (2012). Poles Apart: Solidarity and the New Poland. London: Routledge.
- Kamiński, B. (2016). The Collapse of State Socialism: The Case of Poland (Princeton Legacy Library). Princeton: Princeton University Press.
- Kubik, J. (1994). The Power of Symbols Against the Symbols of Power: The Rise of Solidarity and the Fall of State Socialism in Poland. Philadelphia: Pennsylvania State University Press.
- Laba, R. (2016). The Roots of Solidarity: A Political Sociology of Poland's Working-Class Democratization (Princeton Legacy Library). Princeton: Princeton University Press.
- Lipski, J. J. (2022). KOR: A History of the Workers' Defense Committee in Poland 1976–1981 (O. Amsterdam & G. M. Moore, Trans.). Berkeley: University of California Press.
- Mastny, V. (1999). The Soviet Non-Invasion of Poland in 1980–1981 and the End of the Cold War. Europe-Asia Studies, 51(2), 189–211.
- Raina, P. (1985). Poland 1981: Towards Social Renewal. New York: Unwin Hyman/HarperCollins.

== Post-Communist Poland ==
- Brzezinski, M. (1997). The Struggle for Constitutionalism in Poland. New York: Palgrave Macmillan.
- Fomina, J. (2019). Of "Patriots" and Citizens: Asymmetric Populist Polarization in Poland. In T. Carothers & A. O'Donohue (Eds.), Democracies Divided: The Global Challenge of Political Polarization (pp. 126–50). Washington, D.C.: Brookings Institution Press.
- Hayden, J. (2012). Poles Apart: Solidarity and the New Poland. London: Routledge.
- Kurczewski, J. (1993). The Resurrection of Rights in Poland. Oxford: Clarendon Press.
- Porter-SzÃ¼cs, B. (2014). Poland in the Modern World: Beyond Martyrdom. Hoboken: Wiley-Blackwell.
- Ramet, S. P., & Borowik, I. (Eds.). (2017). Religion, Politics, and Values in Poland: Continuity and Change since 1989 (Palgrave Studies in Religion, Politics, and Policy). New York: Palgrave Macmillan
- Zubrzycki, G. (2006). The Crosses of Auschwitz: Nationalism and Religion in Post-Communist Poland. Chicago: University of Chicago Press.
- Zubrzycki, G. (2022). Resurrecting the Jew: Nationalism, Philosemitism, and Poland's Jewish Revival (Princeton Studies in Cultural Sociology). Princeton: Princeton University Press.

== Area studies ==
- Milliman, P. (2013). The Slippery Memory of Men: The Place of Pomerania in the Medieval Kingdom of Poland (Illustrated ed.) (East Central and Eastern Europe in the Middle Ages, 450–1450). Leiden: Brill.

=== Galicia ===
- Bartal, I., & Polonsky, A. (Eds.). (1999). Polin: Studies in Polish Jewry Volume 12: Focusing on Galicia: Jews, Poles and Ukrainians 1772–1918. Liverpool: Liverpool University Press.
- Bartov, O. (2022). Tales from the Borderlands: Making and Unmaking the Galician Past. New Haven: Yale University Press.
- Budurowycz, B. (2002). The Greek Catholic Church in Galicia, 1914–1944. Harvard Ukrainian Studies, 26(1/4), 291–375.
- Frank, A. F. (2005). Oil Empire: Visions of Prosperity in Austrian Galicia (Harvard Historical Studies). Cambridge: Harvard University Press.
- Himka, J.P. (1983). Socialism in Galicia: The Emergence of Polish Social Democracy and Ukrainian Radicalism (Harvard Series In Ukrainian Studies). Cambridge: Harvard Ukrainian Research Institute.
- Himka, J. P. (1984). The Greek Catholic Church and Nation-Building in Galicia, 1772–1918. Harvard Ukrainian Studies, 8(3/4), 426–52.
- Himka, J.-P. (1988). Galician Villagers and the Ukrainian National Movement in the Nineteenth Century. Edmonton: Canadian Institute of Ukrainian Studies Press.
- Markovits, A. S., & Sysyn, F. E. (Eds.). (1982). Nationbuilding and the Politics of Nationalism: Essays on Austrian Galicia (Harvard Series In Ukrainian Studies). Cambridge: Harvard Ukrainian Research Institute.
- Pekacz, J. T. (2002). Music in the Culture of Polish Galicia, 1772–1914 (Rochester Studies in East and Central Europe). Rochester: University of Rochester Press.
- Von, H. & Herbert J. (2007). War in a European Borderland: Occupations and Occupation Plans in Galicia and Ukraine; 1914–1918. Seattle: University of Washington.
- Wolff, L. (2010). The Idea of Galicia: History and Fantasy in Habsburg Political Culture. Palo Alto: Stanford University Press.

=== Polish Prussia ===
- Clark, C. (2006). Iron Kingdom: The Rise and Downfall of Prussia, 1600–1947. Cambridge: Belknap Press.
- Friedrich, K. (2006). The Other Prussia: Royal Prussia, Poland and Liberty, 1569–1772. Cambridge: Cambridge University Press.
- Trzeciakowski, L. (1990). The Kulturkampf in Prussian Poland. Boulder: East European Monographs.

=== Silesia ===
- Kamusella, T. (2006). Silesia and Central European Nationalisms: The Emergence of National and Ethnic Groups in Prussian Silesia and Austrian Silesia, 1848–1918. West Lafayette: Purdue University Press.
- Kamusella, T., Bjork, J., Wilson, T., & Novikov, A. (Eds.). (2016). Creating Nationality in Central Europe, 1880–1950: Modernity, Violence and (Be)Longing in Upper Silesia. London: Routledge.
- Karch, B. (2018). Nation and Loyalty in a German-Polish Borderland: Upper Silesia, 1848–1960. Cambridge: Cambridge University Press.
- Wilson, T. (2010). Frontiers of Violence: Conflict and Identity in Ulster and Upper Silesia, 1918–1922. New York: Oxford University Press.

== Topical studies ==
- Armstrong, J. L. (1990). Policy Toward the Polish Minority in the Soviet Union, 1923–1989. The Polish Review, 35(1), 51–65.
- Curry, J. (2009). Poland's Journalists: Professionalism and Politics (Cambridge Russian, Soviet and Post-Soviet Studies). Cambridge: Cambridge University Press.
- Kennedy, M. (2009). Professionals, Power and Solidarity in Poland: A Critical Sociology of Soviet-Type Society (Cambridge Russian, Soviet and Post-Soviet Studies). Cambridge: Cambridge University Press.
- Mason, D. (2012). Public Opinion and Political Change in Poland, 1980–1982 (Cambridge Russian, Soviet and Post-Soviet Studies). Cambridge: Cambridge University Press.

=== Arts and culture ===
- Bogucka, M. (1996). Lost World of the "Sarmatians": Custom As the Regulator of Polish Social Life in Early Modern Times. Warsaw: Polish Academy of Sciences, Institute of History.
- Boleslawska, B. (2002). Andrzej Panufnik and the Pressures of Stalinism in Post-War Poland. Tempo, 220, 14–19.
- Cooley, T. J. (2005). Making Music in the Polish Tatras: Tourists, Ethnographers, and Mountain Musicians. Bloomington: Indiana University Press.
- Czaplicka, J. (Ed.). (2005). Lviv: A City in the Crosscurrents of Culture. Cambridge: Harvard Ukrainian Research institute.
- Dyboski, R. (1924). Literature and National Life in Modern Poland. The Slavonic Review, 3(7), 117–30.
- Eile, S. (2000). Literature and Nationalism in Partitioned Poland, 1795–1918 (Studies in International Security). New York: Macmillan.
- Fiszman, S. (Ed.). (1989). The Polish Renaissance in Its European Context (Polish Institute of Arts and Sciences of America). Bloomington: Indiana University Press.
- Hlasko, M., & Anders, J. (2013). Beautiful Twentysomethings (R. Ufberg, Trans.). DeKalb: Northern Illinois University Press.
- Haltof, M. (2014). Postwar Poland: Geopolitics and Cinema. In Polish Film and the Holocaust: Politics and Memory (pp. 11–27). Berghahn Books.
- Hanzl, M. (2022). Jewish Culture and Urban Form: A Case Study of Central Poland before the Holocaust (Routledge Histories of Central and Eastern Europe). London: Routledge.
- Jedlicki, J. (1997). Polish Nineteenth-Century Approaches to Western Civilization (A. Doyle, & B. Petrowska Trans.). Budapest: Central European University Press.
- Kridl, M. (1967). A Survey of Polish Literature and Culture. Berlin: Mouton.
- Mazierska, E. (2017). Poland Daily: Economy, Work, Consumption and Social Class in Polish Cinema. New York: Berghahn Books.
- Miłosz, C. (1983). The History of Polish Literature (Updated ed.). Berkeley: University of California Press.
- Pac, T. (2022). Common Culture and the Ideology of Difference in Medieval and Contemporary Poland. London: Lexington Books.
- Pekacz, J. T. (2002). Music in the Culture of Polish Galicia, 1772–1914 (Rochester Studies in East and Central Europe). Rochester: University of Rochester Press.
- Plach, E. (2006). The Clash of Moral Nations: Cultural Politics in Pilsudski's Poland, 1926–1935 (Polish and Polish American Studies). Athens: Ohio University Press.
- Przybył-Sadowska, E. (2021). Worldviews and images.: Controversy over the use of sacred symbols and images in the social space of contemporary Poland. In M. Czeremski & K. Zieliński (Eds.), Worldview in Narrative and Non-narrative Expression: The Cognitive, Anthropological, and Literary Perspective (pp. 183–200). Berlin: Harrassowitz Verlag.
- Ramet, S. P., Ringdal, K., & Dośpiał-Borysiak, K. (Eds.). (2019). Civic and Uncivic Values in Poland: Value Transformation, Education, and Culture'. Budapest: Central European University Press.
- Ransel, D. L., & Shallcross, B. (Eds.). (2005). Polish Encounters, Russian Identity (Indiana-Michigan Series in Russian and East European Studies). Bloomington: Indiana University Press.
- Sabaliauskaitė, K. (2015). Silva Rerum I, Silva Rerum II, and Silva Rerum III – Between Fact and Fiction Recreating the Early Modern Culture of the Polish Lithuanian Commonwealth in Contemporary Literature. The Polish Review, 60(1), 39–62.
- Segel, H. (1989). Renaissance Culture in Poland: The Rise of Humanism 1470–1543. Ithaca: Cornell University Press.
- Skaff, S. (2008). The Law of the Looking Glass: Cinema in Poland, 1896–1939. Athens: Ohio University Press.
- Snyder, T. (2005). Sketches from a Secret War: A Polish Artist s Mission to Liberate Soviet Ukraine (Annotated ed.). New Haven: Yale University Press.
- Szczerski, A. (2016). Global Socialist Realism: The Representation of Non-European Cultures in Polish Art of the 1950s. In J. Bazin, P. D. Glatigny, & P. Piotrowski (Eds.), Art beyond Borders: Artistic Exchange in Communist Europe (1945–1989) (pp. 439–52). Budapest: Central European University Press.
- Szylak, A. (2000). The New Art for the New Reality: Some Remarks on Contemporary Art in Poland. Art Journal, 59(1), 54–63.
- Trojanowska, T., Niżyńska, J., Czapliński, P., & Polakowska, A. (Eds.). (2018). Being Poland: A New History of Polish Literature and Culture since 1918. University of Toronto Press.
- Walicki, A. (1982). Philosophy and Romantic Nationalism: The Case of Poland. Oxford: Oxford University Press.
- Zank, W. (1998). The German Melting-Pot: Multiculturality in Historical Perspective. New York: Palgrave Macmillan.

==== Customs, traditions, and folklore ====
- Knab, S. H., & Krysa, C. M. (1996). Polish Customs, Traditions, and Folklore (Illustrated ed.). New York: Hippocrene Books.
- Silverman, D. A. (2000). Polish-American Folklore. Champaign: University of Illinois Press.

==== Religion and philosophy ====
- Mucha, J. (1993). Religious Revival Movement in Changing Poland. From Opposition to the Participation in the Systemic Transformations. The Polish Sociological Bulletin, 102, 139–48.
- Pomian-Srzednicki, M. (1982). Religious Change in Contemporary Poland: Secularization and Politics. London: Routledge & Kegan Paul Books.
- Rynkowski, M. (2015). Churches and Religious Communities in Poland with Particular Focus on the Situation of Muslim Communities. Insight Turkey, 17(1), 143–69.
- Tazbir, J. (1973). A State without Stakes: Polish Religious Toleration in the Sixteenth and Seventeenth Centuries. New York: Kosciuszko Foundation.
- Will, J. E. (1984). Church and State in the Struggle for Human Rights in Poland. Journal of Law and Religion, 2(1), 153–76.
- Życinski, J. (1992). The Role of Religious and Intellectual Elements in Overcoming Marxism in Poland. Studies in Soviet Thought, 43(2), 139–57.

===== Christianity =====
- Back, L. S. (2012). The Quaker Mission in Poland: Relief, Reconstruction, and Religion. Quaker History, 101(2), 1–23.
- Bérier, F. L. de, & Domingo, R. (Eds.). (2022). Law and Christianity in Poland: The Legacy of the Great Jurists. London: Routledge.
- Bjork, J. (2009). Neither German nor Pole: Catholicism and National Indifference in a Central European Borderland (Social History, Popular Culture, and Politics in Germany). Ann Arbor: University of Michigan Press.
- Budurowycz, B. (2002). The Greek Catholic Church in Galicia, 1914–1944. Harvard Ukrainian Studies, 26(1/4), 291–375.
- Fletcher, R. (1997). The Conversion of Europe: from Paganism to Christianity 371–1386. New York: Harper.
- Grzymata-Busse, A. (2015). Post-Communist Divergence: Poland and Croatia. In Nations under God: How Churches Use Moral Authority to Influence Policy (pp. 145–226). Princeton University Press.
- Himka, J. P. (1984). The Greek Catholic Church and Nation-Building in Galicia, 1772–1918. Harvard Ukrainian Studies, 8(3/4), 426–52.
- Kloczowski, J. (2000). A History of Polish Christianity. Cambridge: Cambridge University Press.
- Kosicki, P. H. (2018). Catholics on the Barricades: Poland, France, and "Revolution," 1891–1956. Yale University Press.
- Kunicki, M. (2012). Between the Brown and the Red: Nationalism, Catholicism and Communism in Twentieth-Century Poland. The Politics of Bolesław Piasecki. Athens: Ohio University Press.
- Michałowski, R. (2016). The Gniezno Summit: The Religious Premises of the Founding of the Archbishopric of Gniezno (East Central and Eastern Europe in the Middle Ages). Leiden: Brill Academic.
- Monticone, P. R. C. (1986). The Catholic Church in Communist Poland 1945–1985. Boulder: East European Monographs.
- Musteikis, A. (1988). The Reformation in Lithuania: Religious Fluctuations in the Sixteenth Century. Boulder: East European Monographs.
- Nowakowska, N. (2017). Church, State and Dynasty in Renaissance Poland: The Career of Cardinal Fryderyk Jagiellon (Catholic Christendom, 1300–1700). London: Routledge.
- Pease, N. (2009). Rome's Most Faithful Daughter: The Catholic Church and Independent Poland 1914–1939 (Polish and Polish American Studies). Athens: Ohio University Press.
- Porter-Szucs, B. (2011). Faith and Fatherland: Catholicism, Modernity, and Poland. Oxford: Oxford University Press.
- Stokłosa, K. (2018). Catholicism and Patriotism in Poland during the First World War. Kirchliche Zeitgeschichte, 31(1), 184–93.
- Turowicz, J. (1973). The Changing Catholicism in Poland. Canadian Slavonic Papers, 15(1/2), 151–57.
- Wolff, L. (2002). The Uniate Church and the Partitions of Poland: Religious Survival in an Age of Enlightened Absolutism. Harvard Ukrainian Studies, 26(1/4), 153–244.
- Žemlička, Josef (2014). "The Christianization and State Formation Process in Central Europe". The Cyril and Methodius Mission and Europe: 1150 Years Since the Arrival of the Thessaloniki Brothers in Great Moravia. pp. 22–27. ISBN 978-80-86023-51-9. OS LG 2023-08-18.

===== Jewish =====
- Abramsky, C. (1986). Jachimczyk, M. and Polonsky, A. (Eds.). The Jews in Poland. Oxford: Blackwell.
- Blobaum, R. E. (Ed.). (2005). Antisemitism and Its Opponents in Modern Poland. Ithaca: Cornell University Press.
- Cichopek-Gajraj, A. (2021). Agency and Displacement of Ethnic Polish and Jewish Families after World War II. Polish American Studies, 78(1), 60–82.
- Cohen, B., & Krassowski, W. (2018). Opening the Drawer: The Hidden Identities of Polish Jews. Elstree: Vallentine Mitchell.
- Eisenbach, A. (1992). The Emancipation of the Jews in Poland, 1780–1870. Oxford: Blackwell.
- Gross, J. (2006). Fear: Anti-Semitism in Poland After Auschwitz. New York: Random House.
- Grzymala-Busse, A., & Slater, D. (2018). Making Godly Nations: Church-State Pathways in Poland and the Philippines. Comparative Politics, 50(4), 545–64.
- Gudziak, B. (1999). Crisis and Reform: The Kievan Metropolitanate, the Patriarchate of Constantinople and the Genesis of the Union of Brest (Harvard Series in Ukrainian Studies). Cambridge: Harvard University Press.
- Hagen, W. (1981). Germans, Poles, and Jews. The Nationality Conflict in the Prussian East, 1772–1914. Chicago: University of Chicago Press.
- Huener, J. (2003). Auschwitz, Poland, and the Politics of Commemoration, 1945–1979 (Polish and Polish American Studies). Athens: Ohio University Press.
- Hundert, G. D., (1981). Jews, Money and Society in the Seventeenth-Century Polish Commonwealth: The Case of Krakow. Jewish Social Studies, 43(3/4), 261–74.
- Hundert, G. (1991). The Jews in a Polish Town: The Case of Opatów in the Eighteenth Century (Johns Hopkins Jewish Studies). Baltimore: Johns Hopkins University Press.
- Hundert, G. D. (2004). Jews in Poland-Lithuania in the Eighteenth Century: A Genealogy of Modernity. Berkeley: University of California Press.
- Mahler, R. (1944). Jews in Public Service and the Liberal Professions in Poland, 1918–39. Jewish Social Studies, 6(4), 291–350.
- Martin, S., & Polonsky, A. (2004). Jewish Life in Cracow 1918–1939 (Illustrated ed.). London: Vallentine Mitchell.
- Michlic, J. B. (2006). Poland's Threatening Other: The Image of the Jew from 1880 to the Present. University of Nebraska Press.
- Michlic, J. B. (2007). The Soviet Occupation of Poland, 1939–41, and the Stereotype of the Anti-Polish and Pro-Soviet Jew. Jewish Social Studies, 13(3), 135–76.
- Moss, K. B. (2021). An Unchosen People: Jewish Political Reckoning in Interwar Poland. Cambridge: Harvard University Press.
- Nomberg-Przytyk, S. (2022). Communist Poland: A Jewish Woman's Experience (H. Levitsky & J. Włodarczyk, Eds.; P. Parsky, Trans.). London: Lexington Books.
- Olczak-Roniker, J. (2005). In the Garden of Memory: A Family Life. London: Orion Publishing.
- Pinchuk, B.-C. (1986). Cultural Sovietization in a Multi-Ethnic Environment: Jewish Culture in Soviet Poland, 1939–1941. Jewish Social Studies, 48(2), 163–74.
- Plocker, A. (2022). The Expulsion of Jews from Communist Poland: Memory Wars and Homeland Anxieties. Bloomington: Indiana University Press.
- Polonsky, A. (Ed.). (1993). From Shtetl to Socialism: Studies from Polin. Liverpool University Press.
- Polonsky, A., & Basista, J. (1993). The Jews in Old Poland: 1000–1795. (A. Link-Lenczowski, Ed.). London: I B Tauris & Co.
- Polonsky, A., & Michlic, J. B. (2003). The Neighbours Respond: The Controversy over the Jedwabne Massacre in Poland. Princeton: Princeton University Press.
- Polonsky, A. (2012). The Jews in Poland and Russia (3 vols.). Oxford: Littman Library of Jewish Civilization.
- Polonsky, A. (2013). Jews in Poland and Russia: A Short History. Liverpool: The Littman Library of Jewish Civilization in association with Liverpool University Press.
- Prokop-Janiec, E. (2019). Jewish Intellectuals, National Suffering, Contemporary Poland. The Polish Review, 64(2), 24–36.
- Redlich, S. (2002). Together and Apart in Brzezany: Poles, Jews, and Ukrainians, 1919–1945 (Illustrated ed.). Bloomington: Indiana University Press.
- Rosman, M. (1990). The Lords' Jews: Magnate–Jewish Relations in the Polish–Lithuanian Commonwealth During the Eighteenth Century (Illustrated ed.) (Harvard Ukrainian Research Institute Publications). Cambridge: Harvard University Press.
- Sinkoff, N. (2004). Out of the Shtetl: Making Jews Modern in the Polish Borderlands. Providence: Brown Judaic Studies.
- Teter, M. (2005). Jews and Heretics in Catholic Poland: A Beleaguered Church in the Post-Reformation Era (Illustrated ed.). Cambridge: Cambridge University Press.
- Ury, S. (2012). Barricades and Banners: The Revolution of 1905 and the Transformation of Warsaw Jewry (Stanford Studies in Jewish History and Culture). Palo Alto: Stanford University Press.
- Veidlinger, J. (2021). In the Midst of Civilized Europe: The Pogroms of 1918–1921 and the Onset of the Holocaust. London: Picador.
- Weeks, T. R. (2005). From Assimilation to Antisemitism: The "Jewish Question" in Poland, 1850–1914. DeKalb: Northern Illinois University Press.
- Zubrzycki, G. (2006). The Crosses of Auschwitz: Nationalism and Religion in Post-Communist Poland. Chicago: University of Chicago Press.
- Zubrzycki, G. (2022). Resurrecting the Jew: Nationalism, Philosemitism, and Poland's Jewish Revival. Princeton: Princeton University Press.

===== Philosophy =====
- Blejwas, S. A. (1984). Realism in Polish Politics: Warsaw Positivism and National Survival in Nineteenth Century Poland (Yale Russian & East European Publications). New Haven: Yale University Press.
- Janowski, M. (2004). Polish Liberal Thought Before 1918. Budapest: Central European University Press.
- Ludwikowski, R. R. (1991). Continuity and Change in Poland: Conservatism in Polish Political Thought. Catholic University of America Press.
- Naimark, N. M. (2018).The History of the "Proletariat": The Emergence of Marxism in the Kingdom of Poland, 1870–1887. Cambridge: Cambridge University Press.
- Pac, T. (2022). Common Culture and the Ideology of Difference in Medieval and Contemporary Poland. London: Lexington Books.
- Ponichtera, R. M. (1995). The Military Thought of Władysław Sikorsk. The Journal of Military History, 59(2), 279–301.
- Pula, M. B., & Biskupski, J. S. (Eds.). (1990). Polish Democratic Thought From the Renaissance to the Great Emigration. Boulder: East European Monographs.
- Walicki, A. (1988). The Three Traditions in Polish Patriotism and Their Contemporary Relevance. Bloomington: Indiana University Polish Studies Center.
- Walicki, A. (1989). The Enlightenment and the Birth of Modern Nationhood: Polish Political Thought from Noble Republicanism to Tadeusz Kosciuszko. Notre Dame: University of Notre Dame Press.
- Walicki, A. (1991). Russia, Poland, and Universal Regeneration: Studies in Russian and Polish Thought of the Romantic Epoch. Notre Dame: University of Notre Dame Press.
- Walicki, A. (1996). Poland Between East and West: The Controversies over Self-Definition and Modernization in Partitioned Poland (Harvard Papers in Ukrainian Studies). Cambridge: Harvard Ukrainian Research Institute.

===== Other =====
- Urbanik, A. A., & Baylen, J. O. (1981). Polish Exiles and the Turkish Empire, 1830–1876. The Polish Review, 26(3), 43–53.
- Wandycz, P. (2002). The Polish Political Emigration and the Origins of the Cold War. The Polish Review, 47(3), 317–24.
- Wojdon, J. (2012). The Impact of Communist Rule on History Education in Poland. Journal of Educational Media, Memory & Society, 4(1), 61–77.
- Wyporska, W. (2013). Witchcraft in Early Modern Poland, 1500–1800. New York: Palgrave Macmillan.

=== Economics ===
- Carter, F. (1994). Trade and Urban Development in Poland: An Economic Geography of Cracow, from Its Origins to 1795. Cambridge: Cambridge University Press.
- Levine, H. (1991). Economic Origins of Antisemitism: Poland and Its Jews in the Early Modern Period. New Haven: Yale University Press.
- Marzec, W., & Turunen, R. (2018). Socialisms in the Tsarist Borderlands: Poland and Finland in a Contrastive Comparison, 1830–1907. Contributions to the History of Concepts, 13(1), 22–50.
- Poznanski, K. (2009). Poland's Protracted Transition: Institutional Change and Economic Growth, 1970–1994 (Cambridge Russian, Soviet and Post-Soviet Studies). Cambridge: Cambridge University Press.

=== Nationalism ===
- Rossoliński-Liebe, G. (2019). Inter-Fascist Conflicts in East Central Europe: The Nazis, the "Austrofascists," the Iron Guard, and the Organization of Ukrainian Nationalists. In G. Rossoliński-Liebe & A. Bauerkämper (Eds.), Fascism without Borders: Transnational Connections and Cooperation between Movements and Regimes in Europe from 1918 to 1945 (1st ed., pp. 168–91). Berghahn Books.

=== Archaeology ===
- Meng, M. (2011). Shattered Spaces: Encountering Jewish Ruins in Postwar Germany and Poland. Cambridge: Harvard University Press.
- Szczerba, A. (2018). From the History of Polish Archaeology.: In the Search for the Beginnings of Polish Nation and Country. In D. H. Werra & M. Woźny (Eds.), Between History and Archaeology: Papers in honour of Jacek Lech (pp. 355–362). Archaeopress.

=== Military ===
- Drzewieniecki, W. M. (1981). The Polish Army on the Eve of World War II. The Polish Review, 26(3), 54–64.
- Rothschild, J. (1962). The Military Background of Pilsudski's Coup D'Etat. Slavic Review, 21(2), 241–60.
- Schwonek, M. R. (1997). Kazimierz Sosnkowski and the Foundations of Polish Military Policy, 1918–1926. The Polish Review, 42(1), 45–76.

=== Émigrés ===
- Habielski, R. (2010). Democratic Thought and Action Among the Polish Political Émigrés, 1939–89. In M. B. B. Biskupski, J. S. Pula, & P. J. Wróbel (Eds.), The Origins of Modern Polish Democracy (1st Ed., pp. 190–213). Ohio University Press.
- Wandycz, P. (2002). The Polish Political Emigration and the Origins of the Cold War. The Polish Review, 47(3), 317–24.

=== Women and family ===
- Cichopek-Gajraj, A. (2021). Agency and Displacement of Ethnic Polish and Jewish Families after World War II. Polish American Studies, 78(1), 60–82.
- Fidelis, M. (2010). Women, Communism, and Industrialization in Postwar Poland (Illustrated ed.). Cambridge: Cambridge University Press.
- Inglot, T. (2022). Mothers, Families or Children? Family Policy in Poland, Hungary, and Romania, 1945–2020 (Russian and East European Studies). Pittsburgh: University of Pittsburgh Press.
- Jaworski, R., & Pietrow-Ennker, B. (Eds.). (1993). Women in Polish Society. Boulder: East European Monographs.
- Jolluck, K. R. (2002). Exile and Identity: Polish Women in the Soviet Union During World War II. Pittsburgh: Pittsburgh University Press.
- Kenney, P. (1999). The Gender of Resistance in Communist Poland. The American Historical Review, 104(2), 399–425.
- Röger, M., & Ward, R. (2021). Wartime Relations: Intimacy, Violence, and Prostitution in Occupied Poland, 1939–1945. Oxford: Oxford University Press.
- Thomas, W., & Znaniecki, F. (1984). The Polish Peasant in Europe and America. Champaign: University of Illinois Press.

==== LGBT ====
- Basiuk, T. (2018). LGBTQ and Polish Patriarchy. In J. Harper (Ed.), Poland's Memory Wars: Essays on Illiberalism (pp. 196–202). Budapest: Central European University Press.
- Basiuk, T., & Burszta, J. (Eds.). (2020). Queers in State Socialism: Cruising 1970s Poland. London: Routledge.
- Binnie, J. (2014). Neoliberalism, Class, Gender and Lesbian, Gay, Bisexual, Transgender and Queer Politics in Poland. International Journal of Politics, Culture, and Society, 27(2), 241–57.
- Golebiowska, E. A. (2019). Religiosity, Tolerance of Homosexuality, and Support for Gay and Lesbian Rights in Poland: The Present and the Likely Future(s). In S. P. Ramet, K. Ringdal, & K. Dośpiał-Borysiak (Eds.), Civic and Uncivic Values in Poland: Value Transformation, Education, and Culture (pp. 153–74). Budapest: Central European University Press.
- O'Dwyer, C. (2018). Coming Out of Communism: The Emergence of LGBT Activism in Eastern Europe. New York: NYU Press.

=== Violence and terror ===
- Avrutin, E. M., Dekel-Chen, J., & Weinberg, R. (Eds.). (2017). Ritual Murder in Russia, Eastern Europe, and Beyond: New Histories of an Old Accusation. Bloomington: Indiana University Press.
- Bloom, J. M. (2014). Political Opportunity Structure, Contentious Social Movements, and State-Based Organizations: The Fight Against Solidarity Inside the Polish United Workers Party. Social Science History, 38(3–4), 359–388.
- Böhler, J. (2015). Enduring Violence: The Postwar Struggles in East-Central Europe, 1917–21. Journal of Contemporary History, 50(1), 58–77.
- Blobaum, R. E. (1984). Feliks Dzierzynski and the SDKPIL. Boulder: East European Monographs.
- Blobaum, R. E. (Ed.). (2005). Antisemitism and Its Opponents in Modern Poland. Ithaca: Cornell University Press.
- Böhler, J. (2015). Enduring Violence: The Postwar Struggles in East-Central Europe, 1917–21. Journal of Contemporary History, 50(1), 58–77.
- Cichopek-Gajraj, A. (2021). Agency and Displacement of Ethnic Polish and Jewish Families after World War II. Polish American Studies, 78(1), 60–82.
- Curp, T. D. (2006). A Clean Sweep?: The Politics of Ethnic Cleansing in Western Poland, 1945–1960 (Rochester Studies in East and Central Europe). Rochester: University of Rochester Press.
- Hagen, W. W. (2005). The Moral Economy of Ethnic Violence: The Pogrom in Lwów, November 1918. Geschichte Und Gesellschaft, 31(2), 203–226.
- Hagen, W. W. (2018). Anti-Jewish Violence in Poland, 1914–1920. Cambridge: Cambridge University Press.
- Hann, C. (2009). Does Ethnic Cleansing Work? The Case of Twentieth Century Poland. The Cambridge Journal of Anthropology, 29(1), 1–25.
- Kaczorowska, T. (2022). The Augustow Roundup of July 1945: Accounts of the Brutal Soviet Repression of Polish Resistance (B. U. Zaremba, Ed.; H. Koralewski, Trans.). Jefferson: McFarland & Company.
- Kapralski, S. (2016). The Evolution of Anti-Gypsyism in Poland: From Ritual Scapegoat to Surrogate Victims to Racial Hate Speech? Polish Sociological Review, 193, 101–17.
- Levine, H. (1991). Economic Origins of Antisemitism: Poland and Its Jews in the Early Modern Period. New Haven: Yale University Press.
- Martin, T. (1998). The Origins of Soviet Ethnic Cleansing. The Journal of Modern History, 70(4), 813–61.
- Naimark, N. M. (2002). The Nazis and "The East": Jedwabne's Circle of Hell. Slavic Review, 61(3), 476–82.
- Piotrowski, T. (1997). Poland's Holocaust: Ethnic Strife, Collaboration with Occupying Forces and Genocide in the Second Republic, 1918–1947. Jefferson: McFarland.
- Piotrowski, T. (Ed.). (2000). Genocide and Rescue in Wolyn: Recollections of the Ukrainian Nationalist Ethnic Cleansing Campaign Against the Poles During World War II. Jefferson: McFarland.
- Pucci, M. (2020). The Rule of Chaos: The Polish Secret Police and the Aftermath of the Second World War. In Security Empire: The Secret Police in Communist Eastern Europe (pp. 29–76). Yale University Press.
- Sands, P. (2016). East West Street. On the Origins of Genocide and Crimes Against Humanity. New York: Knopf.
- Snyder, T. (2003). The Causes of Ukrainian-Polish Ethnic Cleansing 1943. Past & Present, 179, 197–234.
- Snyder, T. (2010). Bloodlands: Europe between Hitler and Stalin. New York: Basic Books.
- Talewicz-Kwiatkowska, J. (2019). Persecution and Prejudice Against Roma People in Poland after World War II. The Polish Review, 64(2), 37–45.
- Tuszynski, M., & Denda, D. F. (1999). Soviet War Crimes Against Poland During The Second World War And Its Aftermath: A Review Of The Factual Record And Outstanding Questions. The Polish Review, 44(2), 183–216.
- Veidlinger, J. (2021). In the Midst of Civilized Europe: The Pogroms of 1918–1921 and the Onset of the Holocaust. London: Picador.
- Wróbel, P. J. (2014). Class War or Ethnic Cleansing? Soviet Deportations of Polish Citizens from the Eastern Provinces of Poland, 1939–1941. The Polish Review, 59(2), 19–42.
- Zaremba, M. (2022). Entangled in Fear: Everyday Terror in Poland, 1944–1947 (M. Latynski, Trans.). Bloomington: Indiana University Press.

=== Government ===
- Biskupski, M. B. B., Pula, J. S., Wrobel, P. J., & Wróbel, P. J. (Eds.). (2010). The Origins of Modern Polish Democracy (Polish and Polish-American Studies Series). Athens: Ohio University Press.
- Blejwas, S. A. (1984). Realism in Polish Politics: Warsaw Positivism and National Survival in Nineteenth Century Poland (Yale Russian & East European Publications). New Haven: Yale University Press.
- Bromke, A. (1967). Poland's Politics: Idealism vs. Realism. Cambridge: Harvard University Press.
- Fiszman, S. (Ed.). (1998). Constitution and Reform in Eighteenth-Century Poland: The Constitution of 3 May 1791. Bloomington: Indiana University Press.
- Hicks, B. (1996). Environmental Politics in Poland. New York: Columbia University Press.
- Jedruch, J. (1982). Constitutions, Elections and Legislatures of Poland 1493–1977 (Revised ed.). New York: Hippocrene Books.
- Korbonski, A. (1988). Civil-Military Relations in Poland Between the Wars: 1918–1939. Armed Forces & Society, 14(2), 169–89.
- Mahler, R. (1944). Jews in Public Service and the Liberal Professions in Poland, 1918–39. Jewish Social Studies, 6(4), 291–350.
- McLean, P. D. (2011). Patrimonialism, Elite Networks, and Reform in Late-Eighteenth-Century Poland. The Annals of the American Academy of Political and Social Science, 636, 88–110.
- Polonsky, A. (1972). Politics in Independent Poland 1921–1939: The Crisis of Constitutional Government. Oxford: Clarendon Press.
- Prazmowska, A. J. (2013). Anticipation of Civil War: The Polish Government in Exile and the Threat Posed by the Communist Movement During the Second World War. Journal of Contemporary History, 48(4), 717–41.
- Tereškinas, A. (1996). Reconsidering the Third of May Constitution and the Rhetoric of Polish-Lithuanian Reforms, 1788–1792. Journal of Baltic Studies, 27(4), 291–308.
- Tismaneanu, V. (Ed.). (2009). Stalinism Revisited: The Establishment of Communist Regimes in East-Central Europe (New ed.). Central European University Press.

==== Polish communism ====
- Dziewanowski, M. (1959). The Communist Party of Poland: An Outline of History. Cambridge: Harvard University Press.
- Chmielewska, K., Mrozik, A., & Wołowiec, G. (Eds.). (2021). Reassessing Communism: Concepts, Culture, and Society in Poland 1944–1989. Central European University Press.
- Fleming, M. (2009). Communism, Nationalism and Ethnicity in Poland, 1944–1950 (Routledge Series on Russian and East European Studies). London: Routledge.
- Kamiński, B. (2016). The Collapse of State Socialism: The Case of Poland (Princeton Legacy Library). Princeton: Princeton University Press.
- Kunicki, M. (2012). Between the Brown and the Red: Nationalism, Catholicism and Communism in Twentieth-Century Poland. The Politics of Bolesław Piasecki. Athens: Ohio University Press.
- Taras, R. (1985). Ideology in a Socialist State: Poland 1956–1983 (Cambridge Russian, Soviet and Post-Soviet Studies). Cambridge: Cambridge University Press.

=== Foreign relations ===
For works on the Polish government in exile during World War II, please see the World War II section.

- Cienciala, A. (1968). Poland and the Western Powers 1938–1939: A Study in the Interdependence of Eastern and Western Europe. London: Routledge & Kegan Paul/University of Toronto.
- Cienciała, A. M. (1975). Polish Foreign Policy, 1926–1939. "Equilibrium": Stereotype and Reality. The Polish Review, 20(1), 42–57.
- Cienciala, A. M., & Komarnicki, T. (1984). From Versailles to Locarno: Keys to Polish Foreign Policy, 1919–25. Lawrence: Kansas University Press.
- Cienciala, A. M. (2011). The Foreign Policy of Józef Piłsudski and Józef Beck, 1926–1939: Misconceptions and Interpretations. The Polish Review, 56(1/2), 111–51.
- Kaminski, A. S. (1993). Republic vs. Autocracy: Poland-Lithuania and Russia, 1686–1697 (Harvard Series In Ukrainian Studies). Cambridge: Harvard Ukrainian Research Institute.
- Karski, J. (2014). The Great Powers and Poland: From Versailles to Yalta. Lanham: Rowman & Littlefield.
- Korbel, J. (2016). Poland Between East and West (Princeton Legacy Library). Princeton: Princeton University Press.
- Prizel, I., & Michta, A. (Eds.). (1995). Polish Foreign Policy Reconsidered: Challenges of Independence. New York: Palgrave Macmillan.
- Prizel, I. (1998). National Identity and Foreign Policy: Nationalism and Leadership in Poland, Russia and Ukraine (Cambridge Russian, Soviet and Post-Soviet Studies). Cambridge: Cambridge University Press.
- Reynolds, D. (2002). From World War to Cold War: The Wartime Alliance and Post-War Transitions, 1941–1947. The Historical Journal, 45(1), 211–227.
- Roberts, G. (2006). Stalin's Wars: From World War to Cold War, 1939–1953. Yale University Press.
- Wandycz, P. S. (2017). France and the Polish-Soviet War, 1919–1920. The Polish Review, 62(3), 3–15.

==== American-Polish relations ====
- Biskupski, M. B. B. (2002). Hollywood and Poland, 1939–1945: The American Cinema And The Poles During World War II. The Polish Review, 47(2), 183–210.
- Biskupski, M. B. B. (2009). The Origins of a Relationship: The United States and Poland, 1914–1921. The Polish Review, 54(2), 147–58.
- Biskupski, M. B. B. (2016). The United States and the Recreation of the Interwar Polish Economy, 1919–20. The Slavonic and East European Review, 94(1), 93–125.
- Cienciala, A. M. (2009). The United States and Poland in World War II. The Polish Review, 54(2), 173–94.
- Szymczak, R. (2015). Cold War Airwaves: The Polish American Congress and the Justice for Poland Campaign. Polish American Studies, 72(1), 41–59.

==== British-Polish relations ====
- Davies, N. (1971). Lloyd George and Poland, 1919–20. Journal of Contemporary History, 6(3), 132–54.
- Devlin, J. (2020). In Search of the Missing Narrative: Children of Polish Deportees in Great Britain. The International Journal of Information, Diversity, & Inclusion, 4(2), 22–35.
- Nocon, A. (1996). A Reluctant Welcome? Poles in Britain in the 1940s. Oral History, 24(1), 79–87.
- Rogalski, W. (2019). The Polish Resettlement Corps 1946–1949: Britain's Polish Forces. Warwick: Helion and Company.
- Stachura, P. D. (Ed.). (2004). The Poles in Britain 1940–2000: From Betrayal to Assimilation. London: Routledge.
- Stirling, T., Nalęcz, D., & Dubicki, T. (Eds.). (2005). Intelligence Co-Operation Between Poland and Great Britain During World War II: The Report Of The Anglo-Polish Historical Committee (Government Official History Series). London: Vallentine Mitchell.
- Sword, K. (1986). "Their Prospects Will Not Be Bright": British Responses to the Problem of the Polish "Recalcitrants" 1946–49. Journal of Contemporary History, 21(3), 367–90.
- Sword, K., Davies, N., & Ciechanowski, J. (1989). The Formation of the Polish Community in Great Britain, 1939–1950. London: University of London.

==== German-Polish relations ====
- Hagen, W. (1981). Germans, Poles, and Jews. The Nationality Conflict in the Prussian East, 1772–1914. Chicago: University of Chicago Press.
- Halloway, R. (2021). Germany, Poland, and the Danzig Question, 1937–1939. London: Hamilton Books.
- Weinberg, G. L. (1975). German Foreign Policy and Poland, 1937–38. The Polish Review, 20(1), 5–23.

==== Russian and Soviet Bloc-Polish relations ====
- Brzeziński, Z. (1967). The Soviet Bloc: Unity and Conflict. Cambridge: Harvard University Press.
- Mastny, V. (1999). The Soviet Non-Invasion of Poland in 1980–1981 and the End of the Cold War. Europe-Asia Studies, 51(2), 189–211.
- Rotfeld, A. D., & Torkunov, A. V. (Eds.). (2015). White Spots – Black Spots: Difficult Matters in Polish-Russian Relations, 1918–2008. University of Pittsburgh Press.
- Stanisławska, S. (1975). Soviet Policy Toward Poland 1926–1939. The Polish Review, 20(1), 30–39.
- Wandycz, P. (1969). Soviet–Polish Relations, 1917–1921 (Russian Research Center Studies). Cambridge: Harvard University Press.

=== Cold War ===
- Domber, G. F. (2014). Empowering Revolution: America, Poland, and the End of the Cold War. Chapel Hill: University of North Carolina Press.
- Jones, S. G. (2018). A Covert Action: Reagan, the CIA, and the Cold War Struggle in Poland. New York: W. W. Norton & Company.
- Kemp-Welch, A. (2008). Poland under Communism: A Cold War History. Cambridge: Cambridge University Press.
- Maddox, R. J. (1987). Truman, Poland, and the Origins of the Cold War. Presidential Studies Quarterly, 17(1), 27–41.
- Pomfret, J. (2021). From Warsaw with Love: Polish Spies, the CIA, and the Forging of an Unlikely Alliance. New York: Henry Holt and Co.

=== Rural studies, peasants, and agriculture ===
- Brock, P. (1977). Polish Revolutionary Populism: A Study in Agrarian Socialist Thought from the 1830s to the 1850s. Toronto: Toronto University Press.
- Henschel, C. (2015). Front-Line Soldiers into Farmers: Military Colonization in Poland after the First and Second World Wars. In H. Siegrist & D. Müller (Eds.), Property in East Central Europe: Notions, Institutions, and Practices of Landownership in the Twentieth Century (1st Ed., pp. 144–62). Berghahn Books.
- Kieniewicz, S. (1969). The Emancipation of the Polish Peasantry. Chicago: University of Chicago Press.
- Korboński, A. (1965). The Politics of Socialist Agriculture in Poland, 1945–1960. New York: Columbia University Press.
- Spaulding, R. M. (2009). "Agricultural Statecraft" in the Cold War: A Case Study of Poland and the West from 1945 to 1957. Agricultural History, 83(1), 5–28.
- Staniewicz, W. (1964). The Agrarian Problem in Poland between the Two World Wars. The Slavonic and East European Review, 43(100), 23–33.
- Stauter-Halsted, K. (2001). The Nation in the Village: The Genesis of Peasant National Identity in Austrian Poland, 1848–1914. Ithaca: Cornell University Press.

=== Urban studies, labor, and industrialization ===
For works about the Solidarity movements, see the Fall of Communism and Solidarity section.

- Blobaum, R. (2014). A City in Flux: Warsaw's Transient Populations During World War I. The Polish Review, 59(4), 21–43.
- Carter, F. (1994). Trade and Urban Development in Poland: An Economic Geography of Cracow, from Its Origins to 1795 (Cambridge Studies in Historical Geography). Cambridge: Cambridge University Press.
- Clark, E. M. (2016). Gdańsk, Story of a City When Diplomatic History and Personal Narrative Intersect. The Polish Review, 61(1), 61–79.
- Davies, N., & Moorhouse, R. (2002). Microcosm: Portrait of a Central European City. London: Jonathan Cape.
- Delius, A. (2023). Translating Repression into Rights: Labor Protest and Democratic Opposition in Spain and Poland, 1960–1990. Berlin: De Gruyter Oldenbourg.
- Dunn, E. C. (2004). Privatizing Poland: Baby Food, Big Business, and the Remaking of Labor. New York: Cornell University Press.
- Fahey, J. E. (2023). Przemyśl, Poland: A Multiethnic City During and After a Fortress, 1867–1939 (Central European Studies). West Lafayette: Purdue University Press.
- Fellerer, J., & Pyrah, R. (Eds.). (2020). Lviv and Wrocław, Cities in Parallel ?: Myth, Memory and Migration, c. 1890–Present. Central European University Press.
- Fidelis, M. (2010). Women, Communism, and Industrialization in Postwar Poland (Illustrated ed.). Cambridge: Cambridge University Press.
- Frank, A. F. (2005). Oil Empire: Visions of Prosperity in Austrian Galicia (Harvard Historical Studies). Cambridge: Harvard University Press.
- Kenney, P. (1997). Rebuilding Poland: Workers and Communists, 1945–1950. Ithaca: Cornell University Press.
- Hanzl, M. (2022). Jewish Culture and Urban Form: A Case Study of Central Poland before the Holocaust (Routledge Histories of Central and Eastern Europe). London: Routledge.
- Hundert, G. D., (1981). Jews, Money and Society in the Seventeenth-Century Polish Commonwealth: The Case of Krakow. Jewish Social Studies, 43(3/4), 261–74.
- Hundert, G. (1991). The Jews in a Polish Town: The Case of Opatów in the Eighteenth Century (Johns Hopkins Jewish Studies). Baltimore: Johns Hopkins University Press.
- Kaltenberg-Kwiatkowska, E. (1986). Industrialization and Its Effect on the Transformation of Cities in Poland after World War II. The Polish Sociological Bulletin, 73/74, 37–47.
- Kenney, P. J. (1997). Rebuilding Poland: Workers and Communists, 1945–1950. Ithaca: Cornell University Press.
- Lipski, J. J. (2022). KOR: A History of the Workers' Defense Committee in Poland 1976–1981 (O. Amsterdam & G. M. Moore, Trans.). Berkeley: University of California Press.
- Martin, S., & Polonsky, A. (2004). Jewish Life in Cracow 1918–1939 (Illustrated ed.). London: Vallentine Mitchell.
- Polonsky, A. (Ed.). (1993). From Shtetl to Socialism: Studies from Polin. Liverpool University Press.
- Shore, M. (2006). Caviar and Ashes: A Warsaw Generation s Life and Death in Marxism, 1918–1968. New Haven: Yale University Press.
- Snopek, K., Cichońska, I., & Popera, K. (2020). The Architecture of the Seventh Day: building the sacred in socialist Poland. In J. Bach & M. Murawski (Eds.), Re-Centring the city: Global Mutations of Socialist Modernity' (pp. 117–28). London: University College London Press.
- Ury, S. (2012). Barricades and Banners: The Revolution of 1905 and the Transformation of Warsaw Jewry (Stanford Studies in Jewish History and Culture). Palo Alto: Stanford University Press.
- Weeks, T. R. (2015). Vilnius Between Nations, 1795–2000. Cornell University Press.
- Woodall, J. (1982). The Socialist Corporation and Technocratic Power: The Polish United Workers' Party, Industrial Organisation and Workforce Control 1958–80 (Cambridge Russian, Soviet and Post-Soviet Studies). Cambridge: Cambridge University Press.

== Biographies ==
Biographies of major figures in Polish history; excludes pop culture figures, sports, and entertainment celebrities.

- Bethell, N. (1969). Gomułka, His Poland and His Communism. London: Longman.
- Blobaum, R. E. (1984). Feliks Dzierzynski and the SDKPIL. Boulder: East European Monographs.
- Butterwick, R. (1998). Poland's Last King and English Culture: Stanislaw August Poniatowski, 1732–1798 (Oxford Historical Monographs). Oxford: Clarendon Press.
- Frick, D. (1995). Meletij Smotryc'kyj (Harvard Series in Ukrainian Studies). Cambridge: Harvard University Press.
- Jędrzejewicz, W. (1982). Piłsudski: A Life for Poland. New York: Hippocrene Books.
- Snyder, T. (2017). Nationalism, Marxism, and Modern Central Europe: A Biography of Kazimierz Kelles-Krauz, 1872–1905. Oxford: Oxford University Press.
- Storozynski, A. (2009). The Peasant Prince: Thaddeus Kosciuszko and the Age of Revolution. New York: Thomas Dunne Books/St. Martin's Press.
- Sysyn, F. (1985). Between Poland and the Ukraine: The Dilemma of Adam Kysil (Harvard Series in Ukrainian Studies). Cambridge: Harvard University Press.
- Zamoyski, A. (1992). The Last King of Poland. London: Jonathan Cape.
- Zamoyski, A. (2011). Chopin: Prince of the Romantics. New York: HarperCollins Publishers.
- Zawadzki, W. H. (1993). A Man of Honour: Adam Czartoryski as a Statesman of Russia and Poland, 1795–1831. Oxford: Clarendon Press.
- Zimmerman, J. D. (2022). Jozef Pilsudski: Founding Father of Modern Poland. Cambridge: Harvard University Press.

=== Pope John Paul II (Karol Wojtyla) ===
- Bernstein, C., & Politi, M. (1997). His Holiness: The Secret History of John Paul II. London: Bantam Press.
- Buttiglione, R. (1997). Karol Wojtyla: The Thought of the Man Who Became Pope John Paul II. Grand Rapids: Eerdmans Publishing Company.
- Felak, J. R. (2020). The Pope in Poland: The Pilgrimages of John Paul II, 1979–1991. Pittsburgh: University of Pittsburgh Press.
- Kupczak, J. (2000). Destined for Liberty: The Human Person in the Philosophy of Karol Wojtyla/John Paul II. Washington, D.C.: Catholic University of America Press.
- Kwitny, J. (1997). Man of the Century: The Life and Times of Pope John Paul II. New York: Henry Holt and Co.
- Weigel, G. (1999). Witness to Hope: The Biography of Pope John Paul II. New York: Harper.
- Weigel, G. (2010). The End and the Beginning: Pope John Paul II— The Victory of Freedom, the Last Years, the Legacy. New York: Doubleday.
- Weigel, G. (2017). Lessons in Hope: My Unexpected Life with St. John Paul II (New ed.). New York: Basic Books.

== Historiography, identity, and memory studies ==
=== Historiography ===
- Basarab, John; Rudnytsky, Ivan L. (1982). Pereiaslav 1654: A Historiographical Study. Edmonton: Canadian Institute of Ukrainian Studies Press (CIUS) Press, University of Alberta. ISBN 978-0920862162.
- Chmielewska, K., Mrozik, A., & Wołowiec, G. (Eds.). (2021). Reassessing Communism: Concepts, Culture, and Society in Poland 1944–1989. Central European University Press.
- Engel, D. (1987). Poles, Jews, and Historical Objectivity. Slavic Review, 46(3/4), 568–80.
- Friedman, P. (1949). Polish Jewish Historiography Between the Two Wars (1918–1939). Jewish Social Studies, 11(4), 373–408.
- Stańczyk, E. (2014). 'Long Live Poland!': Representing The Past In Polish Comic Books. The Modern Language Review, 109(1), 178–98.
- Polonsky, A. (2004). "The Conquest of History?" Toward a Usable Past in Poland Lecture 1: An Assessment of the History of Poland since 1939. Harvard Ukrainian Studies, 27(1/4), 217–50.
- Polonsky, A. (2004). "The Conquest of History?" Toward a Usable Past in Poland Lecture 2: The Problem of the Dark Past. Harvard Ukrainian Studies, 27(1/4), 251–70.
- Polonsky, A. (2004). "The Conquest of History?" Toward a Usable Past in Poland Lecture 3: Polish-German and Polish-Ukrainian Historical Controversies. Harvard Ukrainian Studies, 27(1/4), 271–313.
- Polonsky, A., Węgrzynek, H., & Żbikowski, A. (Eds.). (2018). New Directions in the History of the Jews in the Polish Lands. Boston: Academic Studies Press.
- Rosman, M. (2022). Categorically Jewish, Distinctly Polish: Polish Jewish History Reflected and Refracted. Liverpool: Liverpool University Press.
- Sabaliauskaitė, K. (2015). Silva Rerum I, Silva Rerum II, and Silva Rerum III – Between Fact and Fiction Recreating the Early Modern Culture of the Polish Lithuanian Commonwealth in Contemporary Literature. The Polish Review, 60(1), 39–62.
- Wodziński, M. (2004). Good Maskilim and Bad Assimilationists, or toward a New Historiography of the Haskalah in Poland. Jewish Social Studies, 10(3), 87–122.
- Wolff, L. (2006). Revising Eastern Europe: Memory and the Nation in Recent Historiography. The Journal of Modern History, 78(1), 93–118.
- Zarycki, T. (2000). Politics in the Periphery: Political Cleavages in Poland Interpreted in Their Historical and International Context. Europe-Asia Studies, 52(5), 851–873.

=== Memory studies ===
- Ambrosewicz-Jacobs, J., & Tec, L. (2021). An Inclusive Model of Memory Work in Poland: Bridge to Poland as a Case Study. Politeja, 70, 227–238.
- Crowley, D. (2011). Memory in Pieces: The Symbolism of the Ruin in Warsaw after 1944. Journal of Modern European History 9(3), 351–372.
- Davis, B. (2003). Experience, Identity, and Memory: The Legacy of World War I. The Journal of Modern History, 75(1), 111–31.
- Dabrowski, P. M. (2004). Commemorations and the Shaping of Modern Poland. Bloomington: Indiana University Press.
- Garbowski, C. (2015). Historical Memory and Debate in Poland and East Central Europe: A Review Essay. The Polish Review, 60(1), 97–110.
- Hudzik, J. P. (2020). Reflections on German and Polish Historical Policies of Holocaust Memory. The Polish Review, 65(4), 36–59.
- Ivanova, M., & Viise, M. R. (2017). Dissimulation and Memory in Early Modern Poland-Lithuania: the Art of Forgetting. Slavic Review, 76(1), 98–121.
- Kobiałka, D., Kostyrko, M., & Kajda, K. (2017). The Great War and Its Landscapes Between Memory and Oblivion: The Case of Prisoners of War Camps in Tuchola and Czersk, Poland. International Journal of Historical Archaeology, 21(1), 134–51.
- Kubow, M. (2013). The Solidarity Movement in Poland: Its History and Meaning in Collective Memory. The Polish Review, 58(2), 3–14.
- Kobiałka, D., Kostyrko, M., & Kajda, K. (2017). The Great War and Its Landscapes Between Memory and Oblivion: the Case of Prisoners of War Camps in Tuchola and Czersk, Poland. International Journal of Historical Archaeology, 21(1), 134–51.
- Kugelmass, J. (1995). Bloody Memories: Encountering the Past in Contemporary Poland. Cultural Anthropology, 10(3), 279–301.
- Langenbacher, E. (2010). Collective Memory and German–Polish Relations. In E. Langenbacher & Y. Shain (Eds.), Power and the Past: Collective Memory and International Relations (pp. 71–96). Georgetown University Press.
- Muller, A., & Logemann, D. (2017). War, Dialogue, and Overcoming the Past: The Second World War Museum in Gdansk, Poland. The Public Historian, 39(3), 85–95.
- Plocker, A. (2022). The Expulsion of Jews from Communist Poland: Memory Wars and Homeland Anxieties. Bloomington: Indiana University Press.
- Steffen, K., & Güttel, A. (2008). Disputed Memory: Jewish Past, Polish Remembrance. Osteuropa, 58(8/10), 199–217.
- Wawrzyniak, J., & Lewis, S. (2015). Veterans, Victims, and Memory: The Politics of the Second World War In Communist Poland (New ed.). Peter Lang.
- Weiner, A. (1999). Nature, Nurture, and Memory in a Socialist Utopia: Delineating the Soviet Socio-Ethnic Body in the Age of Socialism. The American Historical Review, 104(4), 1114–55.
- Wolentarska-Ochman, E. (2006). Collective Remembrance in Jedwabne: Unsettled Memory of World War II in Postcommunist Poland. History and Memory, 18(1), 152–78.
- Wolff, L. (2006). Revising Eastern Europe: Memory and the Nation in Recent Historiography. The Journal of Modern History, 78(1), 93–118.

== Other studies ==
- Avrutin, E. M., Dekel-Chen, J., & Weinberg, R. (Eds.). (2017). Ritual Murder in Russia, Eastern Europe, and Beyond: New Histories of an Old Accusation. Bloomington: Indiana University Press.
- Christiansen, A. (1998). The Northern Crusades. New York: Penguin Books.
- Cole, D. H. (1997). Instituting Environmental Protection: From Red to Green in Poland. New York: Palgrave Macmillan.
- Connelly, J. (2000). Captive University: The Sovietization of East German, Czech, and Polish Higher Education, 1945–1956 (New ed.). The University of North Carolina Press.
- Hicks, B. (1996). Environmental Politics in Poland. New York: Columbia University Press.
- Jacobsson, K., & Korolczuk, E. (Eds.). (2017). Civil Society Revisited: Lessons from Poland. New York: Berghahn Books.
- Kulczycki, J. J. (1981). School Strikes in Prussian Poland 1901–1907: The Struggle over Bilingual Education. Boulder: East European Monographs.
- Liber, G. O. (2016). The Ukrainian Movements in Poland, Romania, and Czechoslovakia, 1918–1939. In Total Wars and the Making of Modern Ukraine, 1914–1954 (pp. 81–108). University of Toronto Press.
- Modzelewski, W. (1994). Pacifism, Anti-Militarism and Conscientious Objection in Poland. Polish Sociological Review, 105, 59–67.
- Tighe, C. (1996). The Polish Writing Profession: 1944–56. Contemporary European History, 5(1), 71–101.
- White, A., Grabowska, I., Kaczmarczyk, P., & Slany, K. (2018). The Impact of Migration on Poland: EU Mobility and Social Change'. London: University College London Press.

== Reference works ==
- Magocsi, P. R. (2018). Historical Atlas of Central Europe (3rd revised and expanded ed.). Toronto: University of Toronto Press.
- Sanford, G. (2003). Historical Dictionary of Poland. Lanham: Rowman & Littlefield.
- Swan, O. E. (2015). Kaleidoscope of Poland: A Cultural Encyclopedia. Pittsburgh: University of Pittsburgh Press.

== English language translations of primary sources ==
- Kochanowski, J. (1995). Jan Kochanowski: Laments (S. Heaney and S. Barańczak, Trans.). New York: Farrar, Straus and Giroux.
- Mikaberidze, A., & Strietelmeier, P. (Eds.). (2022). Confronting Napoleon: Levin von Bennigsen's Memoir of the Campaign in Poland, 1806–1807: Volume I – Pultusk to Eylau. Warwick: Helion and Company.
- Stokes, G. (Ed.). (1996). From Stalinism to Pluralism: A Documentary History of Eastern Europe Since 1945 (2nd ed.). Oxford: Oxford University Press.

=== Memoirs and diaries ===
- Karski, J. (2013). Story of a Secret State: My Report to the World. Washington D.C.: Georgetown University Press.
- Pasek, J. C. (1978). The Memoirs of Jan Chryzostom z Goslawic Pasek (M. Swiecicka-Ziemianek, Trans.). Kosciuszko Foundation.
- Pasek, J. C. (2022). Memoirs of the Polish Baroque: The Writings of Jan Chryzostom Pasek, a Squire of the Commonwealth of Poland and Lithuania (C. S. Leach, Ed.). University of California Press.
- Święcicka, M. A. (1975). The "Memoirs" of Jan Pasek and the "Golden Freedom." The Polish Review, 20(4), 139–44.

== Academic journals ==
- Journal of Borderlands Studies (1986–present); five issues per year published by Taylor & Francis for the Association for Borderlands Studies; ISSN 0886-5655 (print), ISSN 2159-1229 (online).
- The Polish Review (1942–1945, 1956–2019); (Note: Previously published as Bulletin of the Polish Institute of Arts and Sciences in America from 1942–1945.) published by The Polish Institute of Arts and Sciences of America and University of Illinois Press; ISSN 0032-2970 (print), ISSN 2330-0841 (online).

== See also ==
- Bibliography of Russian history
- Bibliography of the Soviet Union (disambiguation)
- Bibliography of Ukrainian history
- Bibliography of Poland during World War II
- Bibliography of the history of Belarus and Byelorussia
