= Belzec, Sobibor, Treblinka =

1987 book by Yitzhak Arad

- Author: Yitzhak Arad
- Publication date: 1987

Belzec, Sobibor, Treblinka: the Operation Reinhard Death Camps is a 1987 book by Israeli historian Yitzhak Arad which discusses Operation Reinhard and the extermination camps of Belzec, Sobibor, and Treblinka. It was published in Hebrew by Yad Vashem, and in English by Indiana University Press. In contrast to Raul Hilberg, Arad paid more attention to the Jewish response to persecution.

In 1999, Michael Berkowitz noted in his review that "this book no longer represents the cutting edge of scholarship," but it "is a tremendous asset toward understanding the Holocaust." As recently as 2019, the book is still being used as the basis of research on the Holocaust.
