= Abraham Margaliot =

Israeli historian

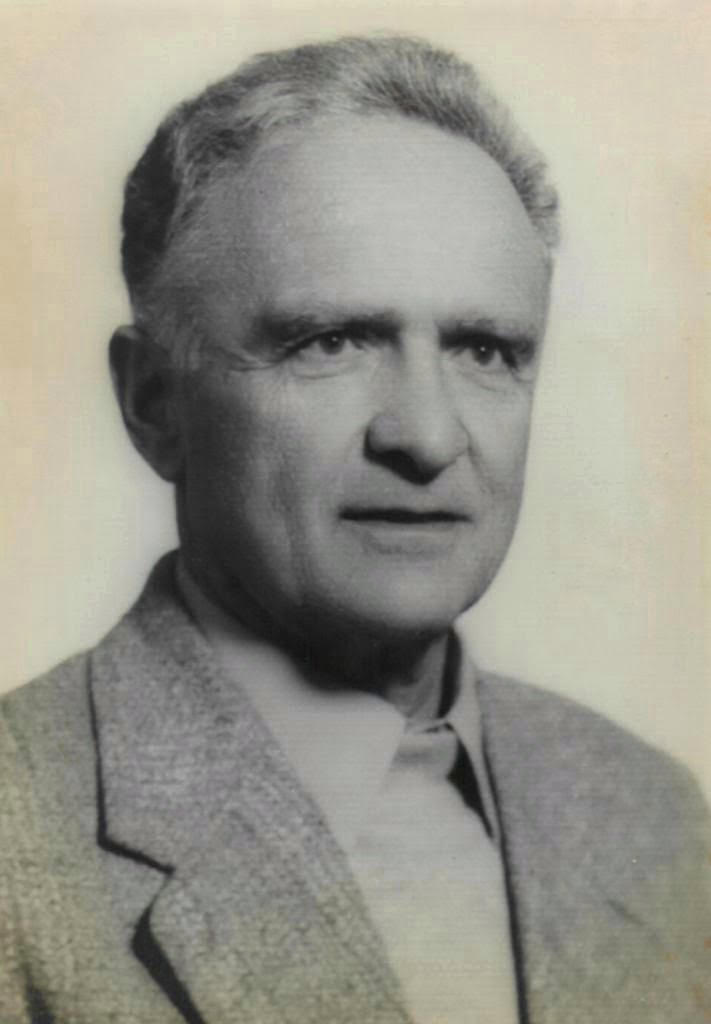
Abraham Margaliot

Abraham Margaliot (Hebrew: אברהם מרגליות; 1920, Chemnitz, Germany - May 14, 1987, Jerusalem) was an Israeli historian with interests in the history of the Jews in Germany and the Holocaust.

Born in Germany, Margaliot immigrated to Israel in 1939. He entered the Hebrew University of Jerusalem in 1940 and studied general history, sociology, and philosophy. At the same time, at various times, he was in military service. During 1948-1984 he taught history in high school and in teachers' seminaries. In late 1960s he completed his Ph.D. on the internal organization of Jewish community during the first years of Nazi Germany. After that he became part-time lecturer of history in the university. His thesis was published posthumously in a book titled Between Rescue and Annihilation (Hebrew: בין הצלה לאבדן).

== Works ==
- Ph.D. thesis: The political reaction of the Jewish institutions and organizations in Germany: in view of the anti-Jewish policy of the National Socialists in the years 1932-1935 (until the publication of the Nuremberg Laws) (התגובה הפוליטית של המוסדות והארגונים היהודיים בגרמניה : לנוכח המדיניות האנטי-יהודית של הנאציונלסוציאליסטים בשנים 1932-1935 (עד לפירסום חוקי נירנברג) ... / מאת אברהם מרגליות.), library entry
- בין הצלה לאבדן : עיונים בתולדות יהודי גרמניה 1938-1932, (Ben hatsalah le-ovdan : ʻiyunim be-toldot Yehude Germanyah), Hebrew University, 1990
  - Also: Between Rescue and Annihilation: Studies in the History of German Jews, 1932-1928, Yad Vashem, 1990, ISBN 9653080091
- Yitzhak Arad; Yisrael Gutman; Abraham Margaliot. Documents on the Holocaust: Selected Sources on the Destruction of the Jews of Germany and Austria, Poland, and the Soviet Union. (1982, rev. 1989, 1999)
- The Reaction of the Jewish Public in Germany to the Nuremberg Laws, Yad Vashem Studies. Jerusalem: Yad Vashem, 1977
