= Yitzhak Arad =

Soviet-Israeli historian and military official (1926–2021)

- יצחק ארד
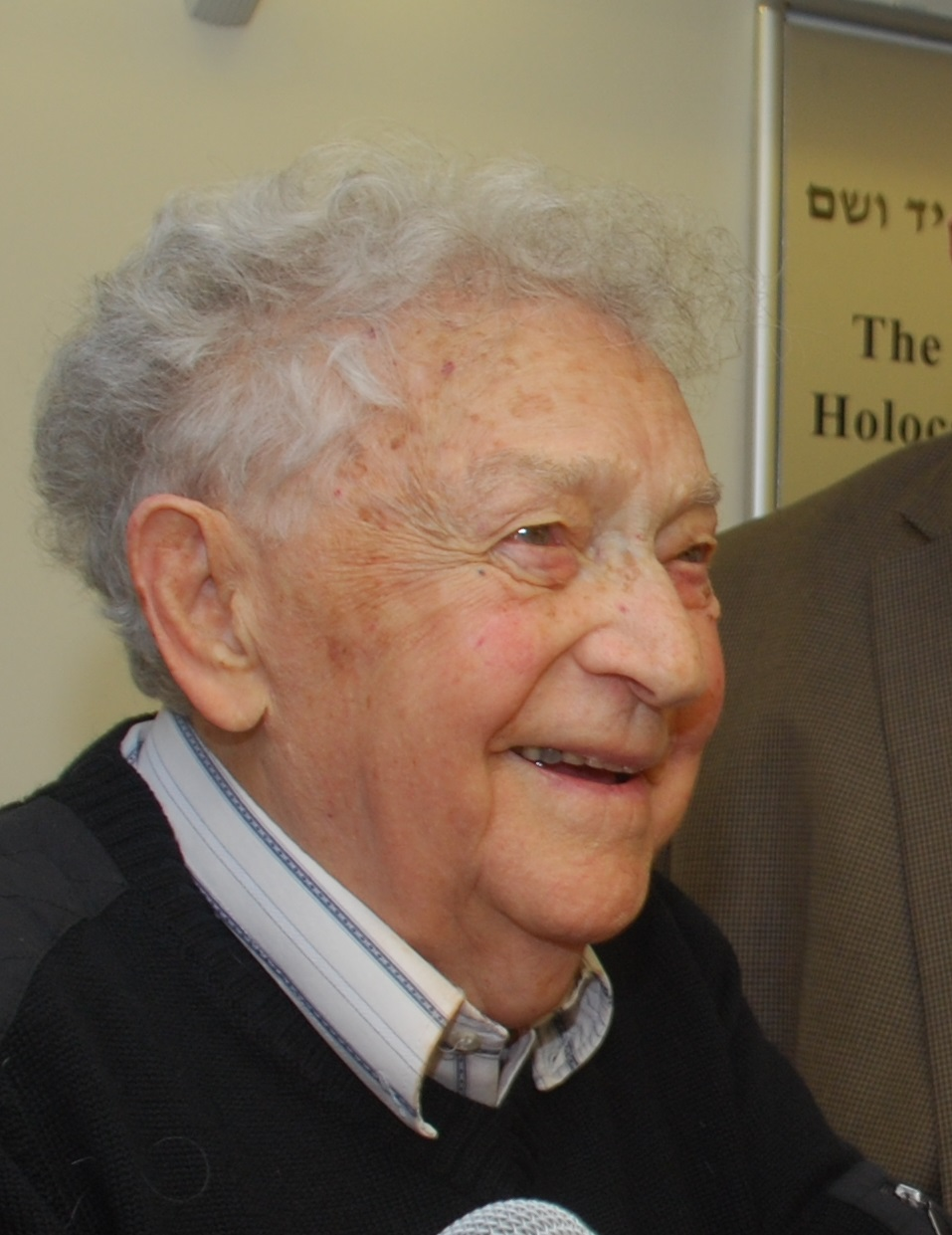
- Arad in 2016
- Born: Icchak Rudnicki; November 11, 1926; Święciany, Second Polish Republic
- Died: May 6, 2021 (aged 94)
- Occupations: Historian, retired IDF brigadier general

Yitzhak Arad (Hebrew: יצחק ארד; né Icchak Rudnicki; November 11, 1926 – May 6, 2021) was an Israeli historian, author, IDF brigadier general and Soviet partisan. He also served as Yad Vashem's director from 1972 to 1993, and specialised in the history of the Holocaust.

== Names ==
He was born Icchak Rudnicki, later adopting the Hebrew surname Arad (Hebrew: ארד). During World War II, he was known as Tolya (Russian diminutive for Anatoly) in the underground and among the partisans.

== Early life ==
Arad was born Icchak Rudnicki on November 11, 1926, in what was then Święciany in the Second Polish Republic (now Švenčionys, Lithuania). In his youth, he belonged to the Zionist youth movement Ha-No'ar ha-Tsiyyoni.

== World War II ==
According to Arad's 1993 interview with Harry J. Cargas, he was active in the ghetto underground movement from 1942 to 1944.

In February 1943, he joined the Soviet partisan Markov Brigade, a mostly non-Jewish unit in which he suffered from antisemitism. Apart from a foray infiltrating the Vilna Ghetto in April 1943 to meet with underground leader Abba Kovner, he stayed with the Soviet partisans until the end of the war, fighting the Germans, partaking in the mining of trains and ambushes around the Naroch Forest (now Belarus). "The official attitude of the Soviet partisan movement was that there was no place for Jewish units" acting independently, said Arad.

In his autobiography, The Partisan, published in 1979, Arad describes among others his participation in a punitive attack on the Girdan village (Lithuanian: Girdėnai) (on page 158): "The last operation I participated in that winter was a punitive action against Girdan, a large Lithuanian village on the road between Hoduciszki and Swienciany", and against Lithuanian partisans (on page 182):

I participated in this mopping-up operation. We thoroughly combed the forests of the region. The deep snow made walking difficult, but it also revealed the footsteps of the Lithuanian bands. After a few days of searching we discovered their encampment. Their forest camp was fenced in and had underground bunkers. We fought with them for a whole day, but by evening none of them remained alive. The next day we counted over 250 Lithuanian dead. Some were in a field near a lake to which they had tried to escape.

== Israeli Army ==
In December 1945, Arad illegally migrated to Mandate Palestine, on the Ha'apala boat named after Hannah Szenes. In Arad's military career in the IDF, he reached the rank of brigadier general and was appointed to the post of Chief Education Officer. He retired from the military in 1972.

== Academic career ==
During his academic career as a lecturer in Jewish history at Tel Aviv University, he Arad researched World War II and the Holocaust, and published extensively as an author and editor, primarily in Hebrew. His later research dealt with the Holocaust in the USSR. Arad also served as the director (Chairman of the Directorate) of Yad Vashem, Israel's Holocaust Remembrance Authority, for 21 years (1972–1993). He remained associated with Yad Vashem in an advisory capacity. Arad was awarded a Doctoral honoris causa degree by Poland's Nicolaus Copernicus University in Toruń on June 7, 1993.

== Dismissed investigation in Lithuania ==
In 2006, following a story in the Lithuanian Respublika newspaper that called Arad a "war criminal" for his alleged role in the Koniuchy massacre perpetrated by anti-Nazi Soviet partisans, the Lithuanian state prosecutor initiated an investigation of Arad. Following an international outcry, the investigation was dropped in the fall of 2008.

Arad said "I have never killed a civilian. It could have happened during battle, but I have never killed a civilian or a prisoner of war in cold blood" and that he was "proud" that he "fought the Nazi Germans and their Lithuanian collaborators ... the murderers of my family, the murderers of my people." Arad has said he believes the investigation was motivated by revenge for expert evidence he gave in a United States trial of a Lithuanian Nazi collaborator.

British historian Martin Gilbert said he was "deeply shocked" by the "perverse" investigation. Efraim Zuroff pointed out that the Lithuanian government had never prosecuted a single war criminal, despite the evidence that Simon Wiesenthal Center had collected and shared. According to Zuroff, "What is common to all these cases is that they're all Jews. Instead of punishing Lithuanian criminals who collaborated with the Nazis and murdered Jews, they're harassing the partisans, Jewish heroes." Some 200,000 Jews were murdered in Lithuania during the Holocaust, mainly by Lithuanian collaborators.

Lithuania's record of prosecuting war criminals has been spotty, leading The Economist to write that the investigation against Jews was selective and even vindictive. According to Dovid Katz, this is Holocaust obfuscation that "involves a series of false moral equivalences: Jews were disloyal citizens of pre-war Lithuania, helped the Soviet occupiers in 1940, and were therefore partly to blame for their fate. And the genocide that really matters was the one that Lithuanian people suffered at Soviet hands after 1944."

== Bibliography in English ==
=== As author ===
- The Partisan: From the Valley of Death to Mount Zion (1979)
- Ghetto in flames: The Struggle and Destruction of the Jews in Vilna in the Holocaust (1980)
- Belzec, Sobibor, Treblinka: The Operation Reinhard death camps (1987) ISBN 0-253-21305-3
- The Holocaust in the Soviet Union (2009), University of Nebraska Press. ISBN 978-0-8032-2059-1
- In the Shadow of the Red Banner (2010), Gefen Publishing House. ISBN 978-965-229-487-6
- ארד, יצחק (2020). זה קרה בפלנטה שלנו: מוסר ודילמות קיומיות בקרב יהודים במציאות השואה (in Hebrew). יד ושם. ISBN 978-965-201-135-0.

=== As editor ===
- Documents on the Holocaust: Selected Sources on the Destruction of the Jews of Germany and Austria, Poland, and the Soviet Union (1982, rev. 1989, 1999) with Israel Gutman and Abraham Margaliot
- The Einsatzgruppen reports: Selections from the Dispatches of the Nazi Death Squads' Campaign Against the Jews July 1941 – January 1943 (1989) with Shmuel Krakowski and Shmuel Spector
- Pictorial History of the Holocaust (1990)
- Ponary diary, 1941–1943: A Bystander's Account of a Mass Murder, by Kazimierz Sakowicz (2005, from the Polish; the title refers to the Ponary massacre.)

== Awards ==
- 2009: National Jewish Books Award in the Writing Based on Archive Material category for The Holocaust in the Soviet Union
