= Kerstin Jacobsson =

Swedish political sociologist

- Born: 1966 (age 59–60)
- Education: Ph.D.
- Alma mater: Uppsala University
- Known for: Political sociology, Democracy, Active labour market policies, Social movements, European Union
- Scientific career
- Fields: Sociology
- Workplaces: University of Gothenburg
- Thesis: (1997)

Kerstin Jacobsson is a Swedish political sociologist conducting research on democracy issues, the European Union, active labour market policies and social movements. She is a professor in the Department of Sociology and Work Science at the University of Gothenburg.

== Education and career ==
Jacobsson obtained her PhD in sociology in 1997 from Uppsala University in Sweden, writing her thesis on democracy in the European Union.

== Scientific research ==
As a political sociologist, Jacobsson has conducted research on Europeanization and the European Union, with one focus on democracy and another focus on employability and labor market policies. She has also studied social movements, primarily in Sweden and Eastern Europe, including animal rights activists and women's organizations.

== Selected publications ==
=== Books ===
- Jacobsson K, Lindblom J. Animal rights activism: A moral-sociological perspective on social movements. Amsterdam University Press, 2016.

=== Edited books ===
- Jacobsson K, editor. Urban grassroots movements in Central and Eastern Europe. Farnham: Ashgate, 2015.
- Jacobsson K, Korolczuk E, editors. Civil society revisited: Lessons from Poland. Berghahn Books, 2017.

=== Scientific articles ===
- Jacobsson K, Schmid H. Real Integration or Formal Adaptation?: On the Implementation of the National Action Plans for Employment, 2002.
- Borrás S, Jacobsson K. The open method of co-ordination and new governance patterns in the EU. Journal of European Public Policy, 11:185-208, 2004.
- Jacobsson K. Soft regulation and the subtle transformation of states: the case of EU employment policy. Journal of European Social Policy, 14:355-70, 2004.
- Hansson N, Jacobsson K. Learning to be affected: Subjectivity, sense, and sensibility in animal rights activism. Society & Animals, 22:262-88, 2014.
- Karlberg E, Jacobsson K. A meta-organizational perspective on the Europeanization of civil society: The case of the Swedish Women’s Lobby, Voluntas: International Journal of Nonprofit or Voluntary Organizations, 26:1438-1459, 2015.
- Jacobsson K, Hollertz K, Garsten C. Local worlds of activation: the diverse pathways of three Swedish municipalities. Nordic Social Work Research, 7:86-100, 2017.
- Bengtsson M, de la Porte C, Jacobsson K. Labour market policy under conditions of permanent austerity: Any sign of social investment?. Social Policy & Administration. 2017, 51:367-388.

=== Popular media ===
- Jacobsson K. Urban grassroots mobilization in central-east European cities. Open Democracy, May 19, 2015.
