= Association for Borderlands Studies =

International scholarly association

- Abbreviation: ABS
- Formation: 1976
- Type: Non-profit association
- President elect: Dr. Laurie Trautman
- Website: absborderlands.org

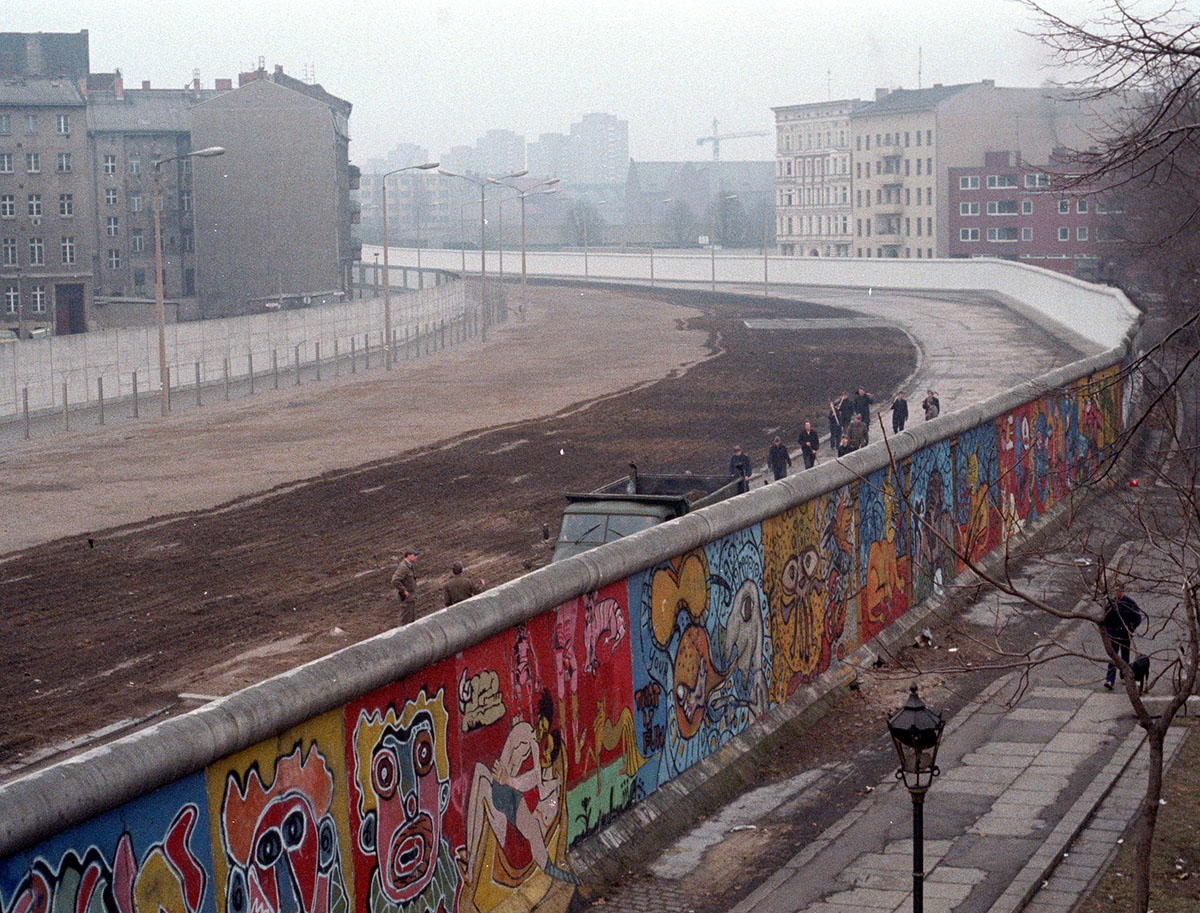
The Berlin Wall, 1986

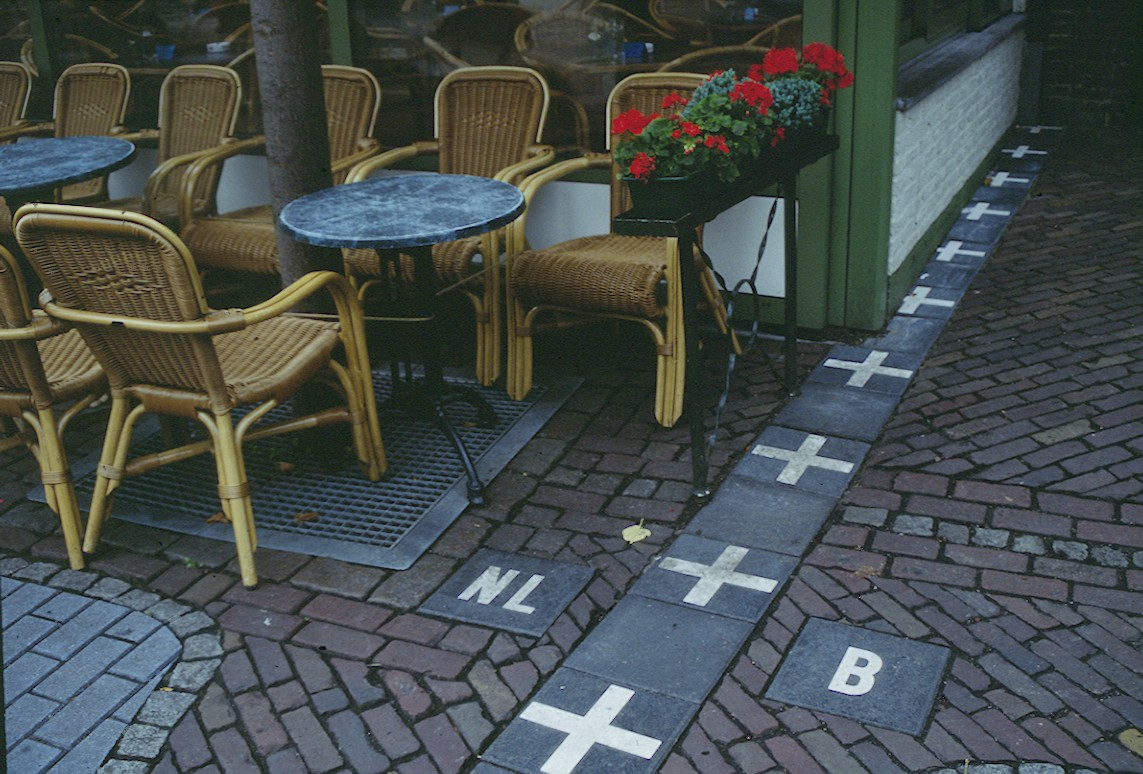
Border between the Netherlands and Belgium

The Association for Borderlands Studies (ABS) is an international scholarly association dedicated exclusively to the systematic interchange of ideas and information relating to international borders and frontier areas. Founded in 1976 with the original emphasis on the study of the United States-Mexico borderlands region, the association has grown steadily. It now encompasses an interdisciplinary membership of scholars at more than three hundred academic, governmental institutions, and NGOs representing the Americas, Asia, Africa and Europe. The ABS publishes an academic journal Journal of Borderlands Studies and an association newsletter La Frontera, as well as sponsoring an annual meeting.

== Activities ==
Contemporary issues dealt with by the ABS include regional economic integration, the emergence of new post-Communist nation states, the proliferation of ethnic conflicts, security versus openness of borders, and the need to institutionalize management of trans-boundary problems ranging from immigration to shared environmental problems to public health and economic development concerns.

Given the diverse nature of borders, borderlands and boundaries, the ABS draws on a range of disciplines and perspectives. Contributing fields include geography, political science, history, anthropology, demography, sociology, psychology, linguistics, security and technology studies, public administration and public policy.

The association maintains relations with institutions and associations with similar interests in the Americas, Europe, Africa and Asia, as well as acting as an important resource for continued research. In conjunction with the Centre for International Borders Research (Queens University, Belfast, UK) the ABS has compiled a comprehensive bibliography of more than 1,000 published works related to state borders, border regions, borderlands, cross-border co-operation and trans-national governance.

More region-specific associations interested in international border areas include: the Nijmegen Center for Border Research, based at Radboud University in the Netherlands; the International Boundaries Research Unit (IBRU) from Durham University, UK; the African Borderlands Research Network; the Latin American Network Information Center; and the Border Information and Outreach Service. The ABS seeks to maintain a listing of these and other border-related resources on its website.

The primary publication of the association is the Journal of Borderlands Studies, published on their behalf by Routledge.

The association also publishes a newsletter, La Frontera, that reports on ABS meetings, professional news, and other information of interest. The newsletter is published semi-annually and all members receive a subscription.

== Annual meeting ==
The ABS sponsors an annual meeting, which provides a forum for a wide range of topics on border regions around the world. The association's annual meeting is held in April of every year, within the yearly Conference of the Western Social Science Association. The ABS also co-sponsors other meetings on border topics. During the annual meeting, the ABS nominates selected publications dealing with borders to receive its annual Book Award.
