= Journal of Borderlands Studies =

- Discipline: Borderlands studies
- Language: English
- Edited by: Sergio Peña, Christophe Sohn

Publication details
- History: 1986–present
- Publisher: Routledge on behalf of the Association for Borderlands Studies
- Frequency: 5/year
- Open access: Hybrid

Standard abbreviations
- ISO 4: J. Borderl. Stud.

Indexing
- ISSN: 0886-5655 (print); 2159-1229 (web)
- LCCN: 90644037
- OCLC no.: 830962357

Links
- Journal homepage; Online access; Online archive; Journal page at association website

The Journal of Borderlands Studies is a peer-reviewed academic journal covering all aspects of borderlands studies. The journal was established in 1986 and is published by Routledge on behalf of the Association for Borderlands Studies. It appears five times a year and the editors-in-chief are Sergio Peña (El Colegio de la Frontera Norte) and Christophe Sohn (Luxembourg Institute of Socio-Economic Research).

== Abstracting and indexing ==
The journal is abstracted and indexed in the Emerging Sources Citation Index and Scopus.
