= Bibliography of Russian history (1613–1917) =

This is a select bibliography of post-World War II English language books (including translations) and journal articles about the history of Russia and its empire from 1613 until 1917. It specifically excludes topics related to the Russian Revolution (see Bibliography of the Russian Revolution and Civil War for information on these subjects). The sections "General surveys" and "Biographies" contain books; other sections contain both books and journal articles.

Works listed here are cited in the notes or bibliographies of scholarly sources. Each is published by an academic or major press, written by a recognized expert, or substantially reviewed in scholarly journals; borderline cases are omitted. A selection of primary sources are included. Many of the books below carry their own bibliographies; see Further reading for longer ones, and External links for historical sites and museums.

Citations follow APA style. (Note: Entries are in plain text APA 7 format without templates; templates are used only for reviews and notes.) Book have citations to academic journal or mainstream published reviews when available. For books only partly about the subject, give relevant chapter or section titles where useful and available. Translators of the original-language edition are included when possible. In cases where a title or name has appeared with more than one English spelling, use the most recent published form is used and a footnote documents any earlier title under which the work appeared.

== General works ==
General works on Russian history which have significant context for Russian history in general or content about this bibliography's timeframe of history.

- Acton, E. (1995). Russia: The tsarist and Soviet legacy (2nd ed.). Longman.
- Ascher, A. (2017). Russia: A short history (3rd rev. ed.). Oneworld Publications.
- Auty, R., & Obolensky, D. D. (Eds.). (1976–1981). Companion to Russian studies (3 vols.). Cambridge University Press.
- Bartlett, R. P. (2005). A history of Russia (Macmillan Essential Histories). Palgrave Macmillan.
- Billington, J. H. (1966). The icon and the axe: An interpretive history of Russian culture. Alfred A. Knopf.
- Blackwell, W. L. (1994). The industrialization of Russia: A historical perspective (3rd ed.). Harlan Davidson.
- Blum, J. (1961). Lord and peasant in Russia from the ninth to the nineteenth century. Princeton University Press.
- Bogatyrev, S. (Ed.). (2004). Russia takes shape: Patterns of integration from the Middle Ages to the present. Finnish Academy of Science and Letters.
- Borrero, M. (2004). Russia: A reference guide from the Renaissance to the present. Facts on File.
- Boterbloem, K. (2018). A history of Russia and its empire: From Mikhail Romanov to Vladimir Putin (2nd ed.). Rowman & Littlefield.
- Boterbloem, K. (2020). Russia as empire: Past and present. Reaktion Books.
- Breyfogle, N., Schrader, A., & Sunderland, W. (Eds.). (2007). Peopling the Russian periphery: Borderland colonization in Eurasian history. Routledge.
- Bushkovitch, P. (2011). A concise history of Russia. Cambridge University Press.
- Chatterjee, C. (2022). Russia in world history: A transnational approach. Bloomsbury Academic.
- Cherniavsky, M. (Ed.). (1970). The structure of Russian history: Interpretive essays. Random House.
- Christian, D. (1998–2018). A history of Russia, Central Asia and Mongolia (2 vols.). Blackwell; Wiley-Blackwell.
- Clarkson, J. D. (1969). A history of Russia (2nd ed.). Random House.
- Connolly, R. (2020). The Russian economy: A very short introduction. Oxford University Press.
- Dmytryshyn, B. (Ed.). (1991). Medieval Russia: A source book, 850–1700 (3rd ed.). Holt, Rinehart and Winston.
- Dmytryshyn, B. (1977). A history of Russia. Prentice-Hall.
- Dukes, P. (1998). A history of Russia: Medieval, modern, contemporary, c. 882–1996 (3rd ed.). Duke University Press.
- Evtuhov, C., Goldfrank, D., Hughes, L., & Stites, R. (2004). A history of Russia: Peoples, legends, events, forces. Houghton Mifflin.
- Figes, O. (2022). The story of Russia. Metropolitan Books.
- Forsyth, J. (1992). A history of the peoples of Siberia: Russia's North Asian colony 1581–1990. Cambridge University Press.
- Freeze, G. L. (Ed.). (2009). Russia: A history (3rd ed.). Oxford University Press.
- Gleason, A. (Ed.). (2009). A companion to Russian history (Wiley-Blackwell Companions to World History). Wiley-Blackwell.
- Grousset, R. (1970). The empire of the steppes: A history of Central Asia (N. Walford, Trans. (Note: Original-language edition: Grousset, R. (1939). L'empire des steppes: Attila, Gengis-Khan, Tamerlan. Payot. Walford's translation was made from the revised 1952 French edition.)). Rutgers University Press.
- Hosking, G. (1997). Russia: People and empire, 1552–1917. Harvard University Press.
- Hosking, G. (2001). Russia and the Russians: A history. Harvard University Press.
- Kochan, L., & Abraham, R. (1983). The making of modern Russia (2nd ed.). Penguin Books.
- Lieven, D. (2000). Empire: The Russian empire and its rivals. John Murray.
- Lieven, D., Perrie, M., & Suny, R. (Eds.). (2006). The Cambridge history of Russia (3 vols.). Cambridge University Press. (Note: The Cambridge History of Russia: Volume 1, From early Rus' to 1689; Volume 2, Imperial Russia, 1689–1917; Volume 3, The twentieth century.)
- Longworth, P. (2005). Russia: The once and future empire from pre-history to Putin. St. Martin's Press.
- Mazour, A. G. (1962). Russia: Tsarist and communist. Van Nostrand.
- Moss, W. G. (1997–2005). A history of Russia (2 vols.; 2nd ed., 2003–2005). Anthem Press.
- Pares, B. (1953). A history of Russia (definitive ed.). Alfred A. Knopf.
- Pipes, R. (1974). Russia under the old regime. Charles Scribner's Sons.
- Poe, M. T. (2003). The Russian moment in world history. Princeton University Press.
- Riasanovsky, N. V., & Steinberg, M. D. (2025). A history of Russia (10th ed.). Oxford University Press.
- Shubin, D. H. (2005). A history of Russian Christianity (4 vols.). Algora Publishing.
- Sumner, B. H. (1943). A short history of Russia. Reynal & Hitchcock.
- Vernadsky, G. (1943–1969). A history of Russia (5 vols.). Yale University Press. (Note: Vernadsky's five volumes are as follows: Vol. 1: Ancient Russia (1943); Vol. 2: Kievan Russia (1948); Vol. 3: The Mongols and Russia (1953); Vol. 4: Russia at the dawn of the modern age (1959); Vol. 5: The tsardom of Moscow, 1547–1682 (2 parts, 1969).)
- Vernadsky, G. (1961). A history of Russia (6th rev. ed.). Yale University Press.
- Ward, C. J., & Thompson, J. M. (2021). Russia: A historical introduction from Kievan Rus' to the present (9th ed.). Routledge.
- Wren, M. C., & Stults, T. (2009). The course of Russian history (5th ed.). Waveland Press.

== Period works ==
- Anisimov, E. V. (2004). Five empresses: Court life in eighteenth-century Russia. Praeger.
- Baron, S. (1988). The Jews under tsars and Soviets. Schocken Books.
- Beer, D. (2016). The house of the dead: Siberian exile under the tsars. Vintage.
- Dowler, W. (2010). Russia in 1913. Northern Illinois University Press.
- Erickson, M., & Erickson, L. (Eds.). (2005). Russia: War, peace and diplomacy: Essays in honour of John Erickson. Weidenfeld & Nicolson.
- Fuller, W. C., Jr. (1992). Strategy and power in Russia, 1600–1914. Free Press.
- Hellie, R. (2005). The structure of Russian imperial history. History and Theory, 44(4), 88–112.
- Hosking, G. (1997). Russia: People and empire, 1552–1917. Harvard University Press.
- Hughes, L. (2008). The Romanovs: Ruling Russia, 1613–1917. Bloomsbury.
- Khodarkovsky, M. (1999). Of Christianity, enlightenment, and colonialism: Russia in the North Caucasus, 1500–1800. The Journal of Modern History, 71(2), 394–430.
- Kleimola, A. M. (1979). Up through servitude: The changing condition of the Muscovite elite in the sixteenth and seventeenth centuries. Russian History, 6(2), 210–229.
- LeDonne, J. P. (1991). Absolutism and ruling class: The formation of the Russian political order, 1700–1825. Oxford University Press.
- Lieven, D. (1989). Russia's rulers under the old regime. Yale University Press.
- Lincoln, W. B. (1997). Between heaven and hell: The story of a thousand years of artistic life in Russia. Viking.
- Lincoln, W. B. (1981). The Romanovs: Autocrats of all the Russias. Doubleday.
- Lincoln, W. B. (2001). Sunlight at midnight: St Petersburg and the rise of modern Russia. Oxford University Press.
- Mironov, B. N., & Eklof, B. (2000). The social history of imperial Russia, 1700–1917 (2 vols.). Westview Press.
- Monahan, E. (2016). The merchants of Siberia: Trade in early modern Eurasia. Cornell University Press.
- Montefiore, S. (2017). The Romanovs: 1613–1918. Vintage.
- Seton-Watson, H. (1967). The Russian Empire, 1801–1917 (Oxford History of Modern Europe). Oxford University Press.
- Weeks, T. R. (1996). Nation and state in late imperial Russia: Nationalism and Russification on the western frontier, 1863–1914. Northern Illinois University Press.
- Williams, B. (2021). Late tsarist Russia, 1881–1913 (Routledge Studies in the History of Russia and Eastern Europe). Routledge.

== Topical works ==
- Alexander, J. T. (1969). Autocratic politics in a national crisis: The imperial Russian government and Pugachev's revolt, 1773–1775. Indiana University Press.
- Anisimov, E. V. (1993). The reforms of Peter the Great: Progress through coercion in Russia. Routledge.
- Ascher, A. (2001). Stolypin: The search for stability in late imperial Russia. Stanford University Press.
- Beer, D. (2013). Decembrists, rebels, and martyrs in Siberian exile: The "Zerentui conspiracy" of 1828 and the fashioning of a revolutionary genealogy. Slavic Review, 72(3), 528–551.
- Crummey, R. O. (1983). Aristocrats and servitors: The boyar elite, 1613–89. Princeton University Press.
- Daly, J. W. (1997). Autocracy under siege: Security police and opposition in Russia, 1866–1905. Northern Illinois University Press.
- Daly, J. W. (2004). The watchful state, 1906–17: Security police and opposition in Russia. Northern Illinois University Press.
- Dunning, C. S. L. (2001). Russia's first civil war: The Time of Troubles and the founding of the Romanov dynasty. Penn State University Press.
- Eklof, B., Bushnell, J., & Zakharova, L. (Eds.). (1994). Russia's great reforms, 1855–1881. Indiana University Press.
- Emmons, T. (2014). The formation of political parties and the first national elections in Russia. Harvard University Press.
- Fuller, W. C., Jr. (2006). The foe within: Fantasies of treason and the end of imperial Russia. Cornell University Press.
- Gatrell, P. (1994). Government, industry and rearmament in Russia, 1900–1914: The last argument of tsarism (Cambridge Russian, Soviet and Post-Soviet Studies No. 92). Cambridge University Press.
- Hughes, L. (1997). Russia in the age of Peter the Great. Yale University Press.
- Kates, G. (2001). Monsieur d'Eon is a woman: A tale of political intrigue and sexual masquerade. Basic Books.
- Kelly, L. (2006). Diplomacy and murder in Tehran: Alexander Griboyedov and imperial Russia's mission to the shah of Persia. I. B. Tauris.
- Kleimola, A. (1979). Up through servitude: The changing condition of the Muscovite elite in the sixteenth and seventeenth centuries. Russian History, 6(2), 210–229.
- LeDonne, J. P. (1984). Ruling Russia: Politics and administration in the age of absolutism, 1762–96. Princeton University Press.
- Levin, E. (2014). A child of Christian blood: Murder and conspiracy in tsarist Russia: The Beilis blood libel. Knopf Doubleday/Schocken Books.
- Lewitter, L. (1958). Peter the Great, Poland, and the westernization of Russia. Journal of the History of Ideas, 19(4), 493–506.
- Lincoln, W. B. (1990). The great reforms: Autocracy, bureaucracy, and the politics of change in imperial Russia. Northern Illinois University Press.
- Lincoln, W. B. (1982). In the vanguard of reform: Russia's enlightened bureaucrats. Northern Illinois University Press.
- Lincoln, W. B. (1983). In war's dark shadow: The Russians before the Great War. Northern Illinois University Press.
- McDonald, E., & McDonald, D. (2011). Fanny Lear: Love and scandal in tsarist Russia. Indiana University Press.
- Madariaga, I. de. (1981). Russia in the age of Catherine the Great. Yale University Press.
- Manning, R. (1982). The crisis of the old order in Russia: Gentry and government. Princeton University Press.
- Mazour, A. G. (1937). The first Russian revolution, 1825: The Decembrist movement, its origins, development, and significance. University of California Press.
- Merridale, C. (2013). Red fortress: The secret heart of Russia's history. Penguin.
- Perrie, M. (2002). Pretenders and popular monarchism in early modern Russia: The false tsars of the Time of Troubles. Cambridge University Press.
- Pflaum, R. (1968). The emperor's talisman: The life of the Duc de Morny. Meredith Press.
- Ransel, D. L. (1975). The politics of Catherinian Russia: The Panin party. Yale University Press.
- Saul, N. E. (1970). Russia and the Mediterranean, 1797–1807. University of Chicago Press.
- Sumner, B. H. (1962). Russia and the Balkans, 1870–1880. Archon Books.
- Tairova-Yakovleva, T. (2020). Ivan Mazepa and the Russian Empire (J. Surer, Trans.; Peter Jacyk Centre for Ukrainian Historical Research Monograph Series, Vol. 11). McGill-Queen's University Press.
- Venturi, F. (1960). Roots of revolution: A history of the populist and socialist movements in nineteenth century Russia (F. Haskell, Trans.). Alfred A. Knopf.
- Vitale, S. (1997). Pushkin's button. Farrar, Straus & Giroux.
- Walicki, A. (1975). The Slavophile controversy: History of a conservative utopia in nineteenth-century Russian thought (H. Andrews-Rusiecka, Trans.). Oxford University Press.

=== Fall of the Romanovs ===
- King, G., & Wilson, P. (2005). The fate of the Romanovs. Wiley.
- Rappaport, H. (2008). Ekaterinburg: The last days of the Romanovs. St Martin's Press.
- Steinberg, M. D., & Khrustalëv, V. M. (1997). The fall of the Romanovs. Yale University Press.

=== Economics ===
- Gatrell, P., & Lewis, R. (1992). Russian and Soviet economic history. The Economic History Review, 45(4), 743–754.
- Gregg, A. G., & Rogers, D. (2022). Introduction: The imperial Russian corporation in and beyond economic history. The Russian Review, 81(3), 407–420.
- Kahan, A. (1985). Plow, the hammer, and the knout: An economic history of eighteenth-century Russia. University of Chicago Press.
- Kahan, A. (1989). Russian economic history: The nineteenth century. University of Chicago Press.
- Marzec, W., & Turunen, R. (2018). Socialisms in the tsarist borderlands: Poland and Finland in a contrastive comparison, 1830–1907. Contributions to the History of Concepts, 13(1), 22–50.
- Monahan, E. (2016). The merchants of Siberia: Trade in early modern Eurasia. Cornell University Press.

=== Empire ===
- Akelev, E. V., & Gornostaev, A. V. (2023). Millions of living dead: Fugitives, the Polish border, and 18th-century Russian society. Kritika: Explorations in Russian and Eurasian History, 24(2), 269–297.
- Baumann, R. F. (1987). Subject nationalities in the military service of imperial Russia: The case of the Bashkirs. Slavic Review, 46(3/4), 489–502.
- Becker, S. (2004). Russia's protectorates in Central Asia: Bukhara and Khiva, 1865–1924. Routledge.
- Bilenky, S. (2018). Imperial urbanism in the borderlands: Kyiv, 1800–1905 (Illustrated ed.). University of Toronto Press.
- Bobroff, R. P. (2006). Roads to glory: Late imperial Russia and the Turkish Straits. I. B. Tauris.
- Dukes, P. (2015). A history of the Urals: Russia's crucible from early empire to the post-Soviet era. Bloomsbury Academic.
- Figes, O. (2010). Crimea. Metropolitan Books.
- Fisher, A. W. (1970). The Russian annexation of the Crimea, 1772–1783. Cambridge University Press.
- Friesen, A. E. (2020). Colonizing Russia's promised land: Orthodoxy and community on the Siberian steppe. University of Toronto Press.
- Gammer, M. (1994). Muslim resistance to the tsar: Shamil and the conquest of Chechnia and Daghestan. Routledge.
- Geyer, D. (1987). Russian imperialism: The interaction of domestic and foreign policy, 1860–1914. Yale University Press.
- Heuman, S. (1998). Kistiakovsky: The struggle for national and constitutional rights in the last years of tsarism (Harvard Series in Ukrainian Studies). Harvard Ukrainian Research Institute.
- Hosking, G. (1997). Russia: People and empire, 1552–1917. Harvard University Press.
- Kappeler, A. (2001). The Russian Empire: A multiethnic history (A. Clayton, Trans.). Longman.
- Keller, S. (2020). Russia and Central Asia: Coexistence, conquest, convergence. University of Toronto Press.
- Khalid, A. (2021). Central Asia: A new history from the imperial conquests to the present. Princeton University Press.
- Khodarkovsky, M. (1992). Where two worlds met: The Russian state and the Kalmyk nomads, 1600–1771. Cornell University Press.
- Khodarkovsky, M. (2002). Russia's steppe frontier: The making of a colonial empire, 1500–1800. Indiana University Press.
- Kirmse, S. B. (2020). The lawful empire: Legal change and cultural diversity in late tsarist Russia. Cambridge University Press.
- Knight, N. (2000). Grigor'ev in Orenburg, 1851–1862: Russian orientalism in the service of empire?. Slavic Review, 59(1), 74–100.
- Kohut, Z. E. (1989). Russian centralism and Ukrainian autonomy: Imperial absorption of the Hetmanate, 1760s–1830s (Harvard Series in Ukrainian Studies). Harvard Ukrainian Research Institute.
- LeDonne, J. P. (1997). The Russian Empire and the world, 1700–1917: The geopolitics of expansion and containment. Oxford University Press.
- LeDonne, J. P. (2020). Forging a unitary state: Russia's management of the Eurasian space, 1650–1850. University of Toronto Press.
- Marzec, W., & Turunen, R. (2018). Socialisms in the tsarist borderlands: Poland and Finland in a contrastive comparison, 1830–1907. Contributions to the History of Concepts, 13(1), 22–50.
- Miller, A. (2015). The Romanov Empire and the Russian nation. In A. Miller & S. Berger (Eds.), Nationalizing empires (pp. 309–368). Central European University Press.
- Miller, C. (2021). We shall be masters: Russian pivots to East Asia from Peter the Great to Putin. Harvard University Press.
- Monahan, E. (2016). The merchants of Siberia: Trade in early modern Eurasia. Cornell University Press.
- Morrison, A., Drieu, C., & Chokobaeva, A. (Eds.). (2020). The Central Asian revolt of 1916: A collapsing empire in the age of war and revolution. Manchester University Press.
- Morrison, A. (2021). The Russian conquest of Central Asia: A study in imperial expansion, 1814–1914. Cambridge University Press.
- Mosse, W. E. (1963). The rise and fall of the Crimean system, 1855–71: The story of a peace settlement. Macmillan.
- O'Neill, K. (2017). Claiming Crimea: A history of Catherine the Great's southern empire. Yale University Press.
- Riegg, S. B. (2020). Russia's entangled embrace: The tsarist empire and the Armenians, 1801–1914. Cornell University Press.
- Rywkin, M. (Ed.). (1988). Russian colonial expansion to 1917. Mansell Publishing.
- Sabol, S. (2017). "The touch of civilization": Comparing American and Russian internal colonization. University Press of Colorado.
- Sunderland, W. (2000). The "colonization question": Visions of colonization in late imperial Russia. Jahrbücher für Geschichte Osteuropas, 48(2), 210–232.
- Staliūnas, D. (2007). Between Russification and divide and rule: Russian nationality policy in the western borderlands in mid-19th century. Jahrbücher für Geschichte Osteuropas, 55(3), 357–373.
- Staliūnas, D., & Aoshima, Y. (Eds.). (2021). The tsar, the empire, and the nation: Dilemmas of nationalization in Russia's western borderlands, 1905–1915 (Historical Studies in Eastern Europe and Eurasia). Central European University Press.
- Steller, G. W. (2020). Eastbound through Siberia: Observations from the Great Northern Expedition (M. A. Engel & K. E. Willmore, Trans.). Indiana University Press.
- Subtelny, O. (1980). Russia and the Ukraine: The difference that Peter I made. The Russian Review, 39(1), 1–17.
- Subtelny, O. (2008). Ukraine: A history (4th ed.). University of Toronto Press.
- Tolz, V. (2005). Orientalism, nationalism, and ethnic diversity in late imperial Russia. The Historical Journal, 48(1), 127–150.
- Velychenko, S. (1997). Empire loyalism and minority nationalism in Great Britain and imperial Russia, 1707 to 1914: Institutions, law, and nationality in Scotland and Ukraine. Comparative Studies in Society and History, 39(3), 413–441.
- Vitarbo, G. (2007). Nationality policy and the Russian imperial officer corps, 1905–1914. Slavic Review, 66(4), 682–701.
- Weeks, T. R. (1996). Nation and state in late imperial Russia: Nationalism and Russification on the western frontier, 1863–1914. Northern Illinois University Press.
- Weeks, T. R. (2001). Russification and the Lithuanians, 1863–1905. Slavic Review, 60(1), 96–114.

==== Indigenous peoples and ethnic groups ====
- Kappeler, A., Kohut, Z. E., Sysyn, F. E., & von Hagen, M. (Eds.). (2003). Culture, nation, and identity: The Ukrainian-Russian encounter, 1600–1945. Canadian Institute of Ukrainian Studies Press.

=== Violence and terror ===
- Penkower, M. N. (2004). The Kishinev pogrom of 1903: A turning point in Jewish history. Modern Judaism, 24(3), 187–225.

=== Religion and philosophy ===
- Adams, A. S., & Shevzov, V. (Eds.). (2018). Framing Mary: The Mother of God in modern, revolutionary, and post-Soviet Russian culture (NIU Series in Slavic, East European, and Eurasian Studies). Northern Illinois University Press.
- Bakhmetyeva, T. (2017). Mother of the church: Sofia Svechina, the salon, and the politics of Catholicism in nineteenth-century Russia and France (NIU Series in Slavic, East European, and Eurasian Studies). Northern Illinois University Press.
- Baron, S. (1988). The Jews under tsars and Soviets. Schocken Books.
- Cronin, G. (2021). Disenchanted wanderer: The apocalyptic vision of Konstantin Leontiev. Northern Illinois University Press.
- Givens, J. (2018). The image of Christ in Russian literature: Dostoevsky, Tolstoy, Bulgakov, Pasternak (NIU Series in Slavic, East European, and Eurasian Studies). Northern Illinois University Press.
- Ivanov, A. A. (2020). A spiritual revolution: The impact of reformation and enlightenment in Orthodox Russia. University of Wisconsin Press.
- Kivelson, V. A., & Worobec, C. D. (Eds.). (2020). Witchcraft in Russia and Ukraine, 1000–1900: A sourcebook (NIU Series in Slavic, East European, and Eurasian Studies). Northern Illinois University Press.
- Kizenko, N. (2021). Good for the souls: A history of confession in the Russian Empire (Oxford Studies in Modern European History). Oxford University Press.
- Mannherz, J. (2012). Modern occultism in late imperial Russia (NIU Series in Slavic, East European, and Eurasian Studies). Northern Illinois University Press.
- Rosenthal, B. G. (Ed.). (1997). The occult in Russian and Soviet culture. Cornell University Press.
- Sartori, P., & Ross, D. (Eds.). (2020). Sharia in the Russian Empire: The reach and limits of Islamic law in Central Eurasia, 1500–1900. Edinburgh University Press.
- Smith, D. (1995). Freemasonry and the public in eighteenth-century Russia. Eighteenth-Century Studies, 29(1), 25–44.
- Tsyrempilov, N. (2021). Under the shadow of White Tara: Buriat Buddhists in imperial Russia. Brill Schöningh.
- Walicki, A. (1977). Russian social thought: An introduction to the intellectual history of nineteenth-century Russia. The Russian Review, 36(1), 1–45.
- Worobec, C. D. (1995). Witchcraft beliefs and practices in prerevolutionary Russian and Ukrainian villages. The Russian Review, 54(2), 165–187.
- Zitser, E. A. (2004). The transfigured kingdom: Sacred parody and charismatic authority at the court of Peter the Great. Cornell University Press.

=== Women and family ===
- Engel, B. A. (2021). Marriage, household, and home in modern Russia from Peter the Great to Vladimir Putin (The Bloomsbury History of Modern Russia Series). Bloomsbury Academic.
- Friedman, R. (2020). Modernity, domesticity and temporality in Russia: Time at home. Bloomsbury.
- Ilic, M. (Ed.). (2017). The Palgrave handbook of women and gender in twentieth-century Russia and the Soviet Union. Palgrave Macmillan.
- Kates, G. (2001). Monsieur d'Eon is a woman: A tale of political intrigue and sexual masquerade. Basic Books.
- Marrese, M. L. (2002). A woman's kingdom: Noblewomen and the control of property in Russia, 1700–1861. Cornell University Press.
- Martin, R. E. (2012). A bride for the tsar: Brideshows and marriage politics in early modern Russia. Northern Illinois University Press.
- McDonald, E., & McDonald, D. (2011). Fanny Lear: Love and scandal in tsarist Russia. Indiana University Press.

=== Culture ===
- Brooks, J. (2010). The Russian nation imagined: The peoples of Russia as seen in popular imagery, 1860s–1890s. Journal of Social History, 43(3), 535–557.
- Brunson, M. (2016). Russian realisms: Literature and painting, 1840–1890 (NIU Series in Slavic, East European, and Eurasian Studies). Northern Illinois University Press.
- Chrissidis, N. A. (2016). An academy at the court of the tsars: Greek scholars and Jesuit education in early modern Russia. Northern Illinois University Press.
- Cracraft, J. (1988). The Petrine revolution in Russian architecture. University of Chicago Press.
- Cracraft, J. (1997). The Petrine revolution in Russian imagery. University of Chicago Press.
- Cracraft, J. (2004). The Petrine revolution in Russian culture. Belknap Press.
- Dianina, K. (2012). When art makes news: Writing culture and identity in imperial Russia. Northern Illinois University Press.
- Grigoryan, B. (2018). Noble subjects: The Russian novel and the gentry, 1762–1861 (NIU Series in Slavic, East European, and Eurasian Studies). Northern Illinois University Press.
- Jensen, C., Maier, I., & Shamin, S. (2021). Russia's theatrical past: Court entertainment in the seventeenth century. Indiana University Press.
- Kleespies, I. A. (2012). A nation astray: Nomadism and national identity in Russian literature (NIU Series in Slavic, East European, and Eurasian Studies). Northern Illinois University Press.
- Knight, N. (2022). Why did Nadezhdin publish Chaadaev? Interests vs. ideas in the literary politics of the 1830s. The Russian Review, 81(2), 209–225.
- Levitt, M. C. (2011). The visual dominant in eighteenth-century Russia (NIU Series in Slavic, East European, and Eurasian Studies). Northern Illinois University Press.
- Lucey, C. (2021). Love for sale: Representing prostitution in imperial Russia (NIU Series in Slavic, East European, and Eurasian Studies). Northern Illinois University Press.
- Lyssakov, P., & Norris, S. M. (Eds.). (2020). The city in Russian culture (Routledge Contemporary Russia and Eastern Europe Series). Routledge.
- Meir, N. M. (2006). Jews, Ukrainians, and Russians in Kiev: Intergroup relations in late imperial associational life. Slavic Review, 65(3), 475–501.
- Ritzarev, M. (2006). Eighteenth-century Russian music. Routledge.
- Rowland, D. B. (2020). God, tsar, and people: The political culture of early modern Russia (NIU Series in Slavic, East European, and Eurasian Studies). Cornell University Press.
- Shkandrij, M. (2001). Russia and Ukraine: Literature and the discourse of empire from Napoleonic to postcolonial times. McGill-Queen's University Press.
- Smith, A. K. (2021). Cabbage and caviar: A history of food in Russia. Reaktion Books.
- Stites, R. (1983). Prostitute and society in pre-revolutionary Russia. Jahrbücher für Geschichte Osteuropas, 31(3), 348–364.
- Wirtschafter, E. K. (2015). Social identity in imperial Russia. Cornell University Press.
- Wortman, R. S. (2006). Scenarios of power: Myth and ceremony in Russian monarchy. Princeton University Press.

=== Foreign Relations ===
- Bovykin, V. I., & Spring, D. W. (1979). The Franco-Russian alliance. History, 64(210), 20–35.
- Farrow, L. A. (2021). The Catacazy affair and the uneasy path of Russian-American relations (Library of Modern Russia). Bloomsbury.
- Kaminski, A. S. (1993). Republic vs. autocracy: Poland-Lithuania and Russia, 1686–1697 (Harvard Series in Ukrainian Studies). Harvard Ukrainian Research Institute.
- Spring, D. W. (1988). Russia and the Franco-Russian alliance, 1905–14: Dependence or interdependence?. The Slavonic and East European Review, 66(4), 564–592.

=== Regions ===
- Brower, D. R., & Lazzarini, E. (Eds.). (1997). Russia's orient: Imperial borderlands and peoples, 1700–1917. Indiana University Press.
- Kurtynova-D'Herlugnan, L. (2010). The tsar's abolitionists: The slave trade in the Caucasus and its suppression (Eurasian Studies Library, Vol. 2). Brill.
- Morrison, A. S. (2008). Russian rule in Samarkand, 1868–1910: A comparison with British India (Oxford Historical Monographs). Oxford University Press.

=== Other ===
- Adams, B. F. (2019). The politics of punishment: Prison reform in Russia, 1863–1917 (NIU Series in Slavic, East European, and Eurasian Studies). Northern Illinois University Press.
- Bujalski, N. (2022). "Tuk, tuk, tuk!" A history of Russia's prison knocking language. The Russian Review, 81(3), 491–510.
- Cross, A. C. (1997). By the banks of the Neva: Chapters from the lives and careers of the British in eighteenth-century Russia. Cambridge University Press.
- Danylenko, A. (2017). The "doubling of hallelujah" for the "bastard tongue": The Ukrainian language question in Russian Ukraine, 1905–1916. Harvard Ukrainian Studies, 35(1/4), 59–86.
- Erley, M. (2021). On Russian soil: Myth and materiality. Northern Illinois University Press.
- Fitzlyon, K., & Browning, T. (1977). Before the revolution: A view of Russia under the last tsar. Allen Lane.
- Hartley, J. M. (2021). The Volga: A history. Yale University Press.
- Herlihy, P. (1991). Odessa: A history, 1794–1914 (Harvard Series in Ukrainian Studies). Harvard Ukrainian Research Institute.
- King, G. (2006). The court of the last tsar: Pomp, power and pageantry in the reign of Nicholas II. Wiley.
- Lounsbery, A. (2019). Life is elsewhere: Symbolic geography in the Russian provinces, 1800–1917 (NIU Series in Slavic, East European, and Eurasian Studies). Northern Illinois University Press.
- Polunov, A. (2005). Russia in the nineteenth century: Autocracy, reform, and social change, 1814–1914. M. E. Sharpe.
- Raeff, M. (1983). The well-ordered police state: Social and institutional change through law in the Germanies and Russia, 1600–1800. Yale University Press.
- Tatsumi, Y., & Tsurumi, T. (Eds.). (2020). Publishing in tsarist Russia: A history of print media from enlightenment to revolution (Library of Modern Russia). Bloomsbury Academic.
- Weeks, T. R. (1996). Nation and state in late imperial Russia: Nationalism and Russification on the western frontier, 1863–1914. Northern Illinois University Press.

== Military and conflicts ==
- Blanch, L. (1960). The sabres of paradise: Conquest and vengeance in the Caucasus. Viking Press.
- Donnelly, A. (1968). The Russian conquest of Bashkiria, 1552–1740. Yale University Press.
- Duffy, C. (1981). Russia's military way to the West: Origins and nature of Russian military power, 1700–1800. Routledge.
- Englund, P. (2012). The battle that shook Europe: Poltava and the birth of the Russian Empire. I. B. Tauris.
- Frost, R. I. (2000). The northern wars, 1558–1721. Longman.
- Gatrell, P. (2010). Government, industry and rearmament in Russia, 1900–1914: The last argument of tsarism (Cambridge Russian, Soviet and Post-Soviet Studies). Cambridge University Press.
- Marshall, A. (2006). The Russian General Staff, 1860–1917. Routledge.
- Menning, B. (1992). Bayonets before bullets: The imperial Russian army, 1861–1914. Indiana University Press.
- Perdue, P. C. (1996). Military mobilization in seventeenth and eighteenth-century China, Russia, and Mongolia. Modern Asian Studies, 30(4), 757–793.
- Rich, D. A. (1997). The tsar's colonels: Professionalism, strategy, and subversion in late imperial Russia. Harvard University Press.
- Schönle, A. (2001). Garden of the empire: Catherine's appropriation of the Crimea. Slavic Review, 60(1), 1–23.

=== Russia and Napoleon ===
- Cate, C. (1985). The war of the two emperors: The duel between Napoleon and Alexander, Russia, 1812. Random House.
- Duffy, C. (1999). Borodino and the war of 1812 (Cassell Military Paperbacks). Cassell.
- Haythornthwaite, P. J. (2012). Borodino 1812: Napoleon's great gamble (Campaign No. 246). Osprey Publishing.
- Hourtoulle, F. G. (2000). Borodino, the Moskova: The battle for the redoubts. Histoire & Collections.
- Lieven, D. (2009). Russia against Napoleon: The battle for Europe, 1807 to 1814. Penguin Books.
- Lieven, D. (2010). Russia against Napoleon: The true story of the campaigns of war and peace. Penguin Books.
- Mikaberidze, A. (2010). The battle of Borodino: Napoleon against Kutuzov (Campaign Chronicles). Pen and Sword Military.
- Mikaberidze, A. (2014). The burning of Moscow: Napoleon's trial by fire, 1812. Pen and Sword Military.
- Mikaberidze, A. (2005). The Russian officer corps in the revolutionary and Napoleonic wars, 1792–1815. Savas Beatie.
- Nafziger, G. F. (1998). Napoleon's invasion of Russia. Presidio Press.
- Nicolson, N. (1985). Napoleon 1812. Harper & Row.
- Olivier, D. (1966). The burning of Moscow, 1812. George Allen & Unwin.
- Zamoyski, A. (2012). 1812: Napoleon's fatal march on Moscow. Harper Press.

== Biographies ==
- Hughes, L. (2008). The Romanovs: Ruling Russia, 1613–1917. Bloomsbury.
- Lincoln, W. B. (1981). The Romanovs: Autocrats of all the Russias. Doubleday.
- Montefiore, S. (2017). The Romanovs: 1613–1918. Vintage.

=== Peter the Great ===
- Bushkovitch, P. (2001). Peter the Great: The struggle for power, 1671–1725. Cambridge University Press.
- Bushkovitch, P. (2016). Peter the Great. Rowman & Littlefield.
- Hughes, L. (1997). Russia in the age of Peter the Great. Yale University Press.

=== Catherine the Great ===
- Alexander, J. T. (1989). Catherine the Great: Life and legend. Oxford University Press.
- Dixon, S. (2010). Catherine the Great. Routledge.
- Madariaga, I. de. (1981). Russia in the age of Catherine the Great. Yale University Press.
- Rounding, V. (2007). Catherine the Great: Love, sex and power. St Martin's Press.
- Zaretsky, R. (2019). Catherine and Diderot: The empress, the philosopher, and the fate of the Enlightenment. Harvard University Press.

=== Alexander I ===
- Hartley, J. M. (1994). Alexander I. Addison-Wesley Longman.
- Rey, M. P. (2012). Alexander I: The tsar who defeated Napoleon. Northern Illinois University Press.

=== Nicholas I ===
- Lincoln, W. B. (1978). Nicholas I: Emperor and autocrat of all the Russias. Northern Illinois University Press.
- Riasanovsky, N. V. (1959). Nicholas I and official nationality in Russia, 1825–1855. University of California Press.

=== Alexander II ===
- Almedingen, E. M. (1962). The Emperor Alexander II: A study. Bodley Head.
- Radzinsky, E. (2005). Alexander II: The last great tsar. Free Press.
- Rieber, A. (1971). Alexander II: A revisionist view. The Journal of Modern History, 43(1), 42–58.

=== Rasputin ===
- Fuhrman, J. T. (2012). Rasputin: The untold story. Wiley.
- Smith, D. (2016). Rasputin: Faith, power and the twilight of the Romanovs. Farrar, Straus and Giroux.

=== Nicholas II ===
- Frankland, N. (1961). Imperial tragedy: Nicholas II, last of the tsars. Coward-McCann.
- Ferro, M. (1995). Nicholas II: Last of the tsars. Oxford University Press.
- Lieven, D. (1993). Nicholas II: Emperor of all the Russias. John Murray.
- Massie, R. K. (2012). Nicholas and Alexandra: The classic account of the fall of the Romanov dynasty. Modern Library.
- Maylunas, A., & Mironenko, S. (2000). A lifelong passion: Nicholas and Alexandra: Their own story. Doubleday.
- Montefiore, S. (2016). The Romanovs: 1613–1918. Knopf.
- Perry, J. C., & Pleshakov, C. V. (1999). The flight of the Romanovs: A family saga. Basic Books.
- Radzinsky, E. (1992). The last tsar: The life and death of Nicholas II. Doubleday.
- Rappaport, H. (2009). The last days of the Romanovs: Tragedy at Ekaterinburg. St. Martin's Press.
- Rounding, V. (2012). Alix and Nicky: The passion of the last tsar and tsarina. St Martin's Press.
- Service, R. W. (2017). The last of the tsars: Nicholas II and the Russian Revolution. Pegasus Books.

=== Authors ===
- Bartlett, R. (2010). Tolstoy: A Russian life. Houghton Mifflin Harcourt.
- Cronin, G. (2021). Disenchanted wanderer: The apocalyptic vision of Konstantin Leontiev. Northern Illinois University Press.
- Frank, J. (2009). Dostoevsky: A writer in his time. Princeton University Press.
- O'Meara, P. (2016). K. F. Ryleev: A political biography of the Decembrist poet. Princeton University Press.

=== Other ===
- Alexander, J. T. (1973). Emperor of the Cossacks: Pugachev and the frontier jacquerie of 1773–75. Kansas University Press.
- Anisimov, E. V. (1995). Elizabeth: Her reign and her Russia, 1741–1761. Academic International Press.
- Barratt, G. (1975). The rebel on the bridge: A life of the Decembrist Baron Andrey Rozen, 1800–84. Ohio University Press.
- Batalden, S. K. (1982). Catherine II's Greek prelate: Eugenios Voulgaris in Russia, 1771–1806. Columbia University Press.
- Byrnes, R. F. (1968). Pobedonostsev: His life and thought. Indiana University Press.
- Cockfield, J. H. (2002). White crow: The life and times of the Grand Duke Nicholas Mikhailovich Romanov, 1859–1919. Praeger.
- Crawford, R., & Crawford, D. (1997). Michael and Natasha: The life and love of the last tsar of Russia. Prentice Hall.
- Curtiss, M. A. (1974). A forgotten empress: Anna Ivanovna and her era. Ungar.
- Fairweather, M. (1997). Pilgrim princess: A life of Princess Zinaida Volkonsky. Carroll & Graf.
- Fusso, S. (2017). Editing Turgenev, Dostoevsky, and Tolstoy: Mikhail Katkov and the great Russian novel (NIU Series in Slavic, East European, and Eurasian Studies). Northern Illinois University Press.
- Green, A. (2010). Moses Montefiore: Jewish liberator, imperial hero. Harvard University Press.
- Hall, C. (2006). Little mother of Russia: A biography of the Empress Marie Feodorovna, 1847–1928. Holmes & Meier.
- Hughes, L. (1990). Sophia, regent of Russia, 1654–1704. Yale University Press.
- Jenkins, M. (1969). Arakcheev: Grand vizier of the Russian Empire. Dial Press.
- Josselson, M., & Josselson, D. (1980). The commander: A life of Barclay de Tolly. Oxford University Press.
- Jones, W. G. (1984). Nikolay Novikov: Enlightener of Russia. Cambridge University Press.
- Longworth, P. (1984). Alexis, tsar of all the Russias. Vintage.
- Longworth, P. (1965). The art of victory: The life and achievements of Field Marshal Suvorov, 1729–1800. Holt, Rinehart and Winston.
- Longworth, P. (1972). The three empresses: Catherine I, Anne, and Elizabeth of Russia. Holt, Rinehart and Winston.
- McGrew, R. E. (1992). Paul I of Russia, 1754–1801. Oxford University Press.
- Montefiore, S. (2000). The prince of princes: The life of Potemkin. Thomas Dunne Books.
- Ransel, D. L. (2008). A Russian merchant's tale: The life and adventures of Ivan Alekseevich Tolchënov, based on his diary. Indiana University Press.
- Rappaport, H. (2015). Four sisters: The lost lives of the Romanov grand duchesses. St. Martin's Press.
- Rhinelander, A. L. H. (1990). Prince Michael Vorontsov: Viceroy to the tsar. Carleton University Press.
- Robinson, P. (2014). Grand Duke Nikolai Nikolaevich: Supreme commander of the Russian army. Northern Illinois University Press.
- Sutherland, C. (1984). The princess of Siberia: The story of Maria Volkonsky and the Decembrist exiles. Farrar, Straus and Giroux.
- Van der Kiste, J., & Hall, C. (2013). Once a grand duchess: Xenia, sister of Nicholas II. Sutton Publishing.
- Wcislo, F. (2011). Tales of imperial Russia: The life and times of Sergei Witte, 1849–1915. Oxford University Press.

== Historiography ==
- Burbank, J. (1993). Revisioning imperial Russia. Slavic Review, 52(3), 555–567.
- Confino, M. (2009). The new Russian historiography, and the old—Some considerations. History and Memory, 21(2), 7–33.
- Karpovich, M. (1943). Klyuchevski and recent trends in Russian historiography. The Slavonic and East European Review, American Series, 2(1), 31–39.
- Mazour, A. (1937). Modern Russian historiography. The Journal of Modern History, 9(2), 169–202.
- Mogilner, M. (2014). New imperial history: Post-Soviet historiography in search of a new paradigm for the history of empire and nationalism. Revue d'études comparatives Est-Ouest, 45(2), 25–67.
- Sanborn, J. (2013). Russian historiography on the origins of the First World War since the Fischer controversy. Journal of Contemporary History, 48(2), 350–362.

=== Memory studies ===
- Bellows, A. B. (2020). American slavery and Russian serfdom in the post-emancipation imagination. University of North Carolina Press.

=== Identity studies ===
- Brooks, J. (2010). The Russian nation imagined: The peoples of Russia as seen in popular imagery, 1860s–1890s. Journal of Social History, 43(3), 535–557.

== Primary sources ==
A limited number of English language primary sources referred to in the above works. (Note: The Cambridge History of Russia, Vols. 1 and 2 contain extensive bibliographies of Russian language primary sources.)

- Herzen, A. (1968). My past and thoughts: The memoirs of Alexander Herzen (4 vols.; C. Garnett, Trans.). Knopf.
- Steller, G. W. (2020). Eastbound through Siberia: Observations from the Great Northern Expedition (M. A. Engel & K. E. Willmore, Trans.). Indiana University Press.

== Reference works ==
- Kievan Rus. (2016). Encyclopedia Britannica.
- Auty, R., Obolensky, D., et al. (2010). Companion to Russian studies (Vol. 1, An introduction to Russian history; Vol. 2, Russian language and literature; Vol. 3, An introduction to Russian art and architecture). Cambridge University Press.
- Barnes, I., & Lieven, D. (2015). Restless empire: A historical atlas of Russia (Illustrated ed.). Belknap Press.
- Brown, A., et al. (1982). The Cambridge encyclopedia of Russia and the Soviet Union. Cambridge University Press.
- Channon, J., & Hudson, R. (1995). The Penguin historical atlas of Russia. Penguin.
- Gilbert, M. (2007). The Routledge atlas of Russian history (4th ed.). Routledge.
- Katchanovski, I., Kohut, Z. E., Nebesio, B. Y., & Yurkevich, M. (2013). Historical dictionary of Ukraine (2nd ed.). Scarecrow Press.
- Langer, L. N. (2001). Historical dictionary of medieval Russia. The Scarecrow Press.
- Lerski, H. (1996). Historical dictionary of Poland, 966–1945. Greenwood Publishing.
- Magocsi, P. R. (2017). Carpathian Rus': A historical atlas. University of Toronto Press.
- Millar, J. R. (Ed.). (2004). Encyclopedia of Russian history (4 vols.). Macmillan Library Reference.
- Wieczynski, J. L., et al. (Eds.). (1976–). The modern encyclopedia of Russian and Soviet history. Academic International Press.

== See also ==
- Bibliography of Russian history (1223–1613)
- Bibliography of the Russo-Japanese War
- Bibliography of Russia during World War I
- Bibliography of the Soviet Union (disambiguation)
- Bibliography of Ukrainian history
- Bibliography of the history of Belarus and Byelorussia
- Bibliography of the history of Poland
