= Bibliography of the Soviet Union =

Bibliography of the Soviet Union consists of the following sections:

Chronological

- Bibliography of the Russian Revolution and Civil War
- Bibliography of Stalinism and the Soviet Union
- Bibliography of the Soviet Union during World War II
- Bibliography of the Post Stalinist Soviet Union

Topical

- Bibliography of the Holodomor
- Bibliography of the Asharshylyk
- Bibliography of science and technology in Russia and the Soviet Union

Biographical

- Bibliography of Vladimir Putin
- Vladimir Lenin bibliography
- Leon Trotsky bibliography
- Joseph Stalin bibliography

Related

- Bibliography of Russian history
- Bibliography of the history of Central Asia
- Bibliography of the history of the Caucasus
- Bibliography of Ukrainian history

Academic journals

- List of Slavic studies journals
