= Bibliography of Russian history =

The bibliography of Russian history consists of the following sections:

Chronological

- Bibliography of the history of the Early Slavs and Rus'
- Bibliography of Russian history (1223–1613)
- Bibliography of Russian history (1613–1917)
- Bibliography of the Russo-Japanese War
- Bibliography of Russia during World War I
- Bibliography of the Russian Revolution and Civil War
- Bibliography of Stalinism and the Soviet Union
- Bibliography of the Soviet Union during World War II
- Bibliography of the post-Stalinist Soviet Union
- Bibliography of Russian history (1991–present)

Topical

- Bibliography of the Holodomor
- Bibliography of the Asharshylyk
- Bibliography of science and technology in Russia and the Soviet Union

Biographical

- Bibliography of Vladimir Putin
- Vladimir Lenin bibliography
- Leon Trotsky bibliography
- Joseph Stalin bibliography

Related

- Bibliography of the history of Central Asia
- Bibliography of the history of the Caucasus
- Bibliography of Ukrainian history
- Bibliography of the history of Poland

Academic journals

- List of Slavic studies journals
