= Bibliography of the history of Central Asia =

Central Asia
- Area: 4,003,451 km^{2} (1,545,741 sq mi)
- Population: 75,897,577 (2021) (16th)
- Population density: 17.43/km^{2} (45.1/sq mi)
- GDP (PPP): ▲$1.854 trillion (2026)
- GDP (nominal): ▲$669.06 billion (2026)
- GDP per capita: ▲$7,878 (2026; nominal) ▲$21,831 (2026; PPP)
- HDI: ▲0.818 (very high) (Note: 2023 data from 2025 report for "Europe and Central Asia" regional designation)
- Demonym: Central Asian
- Countries: 5 recognized: Kazakhstan; Kyrgyzstan; Tajikistan; Turkmenistan; Uzbekistan
- Languages: Dungan, Karakalpak, Kazakh, Koryo-mar, Kyrgyz, Mongolian, Russian, Tajik, Turkmen, Uyghur, Uzbek, and others
- Time zones: 2 time zones: UTC+05:00: Standard: Kazakhstan, Tajikistan, Turkmenistan, Uzbekistan; UTC+06:00: Standard: Kyrgyzstan
- Largest cities: List^{a}: (Kazakhstan) Aktöbe; (Uzbekistan) Andijan; (Kazakhstan) Almaty; (Turkmenistan) Ashgabat; (Kazakhstan) Astana; (Kyrgyzstan) Bishkek; (Tajikistan) Dushanbe; (Uzbekistan) Fergana; (Kazakhstan) Karagandy; (Uzbekistan) Namangan; (Uzbekistan) Samarkand; (Kazakhstan) Shymkent; (Uzbekistan) Tashkent
- UN M49 codes: 143 – Central Asia; 142 – Asia; 001 – World

This is a select bibliography of English language books (including translations) and journal articles about the history of Central Asia.

Works listed here are cited in the notes or bibliographies of scholarly sources. Each is published by an academic or major press, written by a recognized expert, or substantially reviewed in scholarly journals; borderline cases are omitted. A selection of primary sources are included. Many of the books below carry their own bibliographies; see the Further reading section for other bibliographies, and the External links section for historical sites, academic sites, and museums.

Citations follow APA style. (Note: Entries are in plain text APA 7 format without templates; templates are used only for reviews and notes.) Book have citations to academic journal or mainstream published reviews when available. For books only partly about the subject, relevant chapter or section titles are provided when useful and available. Translators of the original-language edition are included when possible. In cases where a title or name has appeared with more than one English spelling, the most recent published form is used and a footnote documents any earlier title under which the work appeared.

== General surveys ==
- Baumer, C. (2016). The History of Central Asia (Four volumes). London: I.B. Tauris.
- Beckwith, C. I. (2009). Empires of the Silk Road: A History of Central Eurasia from the Bronze Age to the Present. Princeton: Princeton University Press.
- Golden, P. B. (2011). Central Asia in World History. Oxford: Oxford University Press.
- Hiro, Dilip. Inside Central Asia : a political and cultural history of Uzbekistan, Turkmenistan, Kazakhstan, Kyrgyzstan, Tajikistan, Turkey, and Iran (2009) online
- Khalid, A. (2021). Central Asia: A New History from the Imperial Conquests to the Present. Princeton: Princeton University Press.
- Montgomery, D. W. (Ed.). (2022). Central Asia: Contexts for Understanding (Central Eurasia in Context). Pittsburgh: University of Pittsburgh Press.
- Hansen, Valerie (2012). The Silk Road: A New History. Oxford University Press.

== Periods ==
=== Pre-colonial era ===
- Beckwith, Christopher (2023). The Scythian Empire: Central Eurasia and the Birth of the Classical Age from Persia to China. Princeton: Princeton University Press.
- Mairs, Rachel (2014). The Hellenistic Far East: Archaeology, Language, and Identity in Greek Central Asia. Berkeley: University of California Press.

=== Russian colonial era ===
- Becker, S. (2004). Russia's Protectorates in Central Asia: Bukhara and Khiva, 1865–1924. London: Routledge.
- Carrere d'Encausse, Helene. (1988). Islam and the Russian Empire: Reform and Revolution in Central Asia. Berkeley: University of California Press.
- Geyer, D. (1987). Russian Imperialism: The Interaction of Domestic and Foreign Policy 1860–1914. New Haven, CT: Yale University Press.
- Kappeler, A. (2001). The Russian Empire: A Multiethnic History (A. Clayton, trans.). Harlow: Longman.
- Khodarkovsky, M. (2002). Russia's Steppe Frontier: The Making of a Colonial Empire, 1500–1800. Bloomington, IN: Indiana University Press.
- LeDonne, J. P. (1997). The Russian Empire and the World 1700–1917: The Geopolitics of Expansion and Containment, Oxford: Oxford University Press.
- Morrison, A., Drieu, C., & Chokobaeva, A. (Eds.). (2020). The Central Asian Revolt of 1916: A Collapsing Empire in the Age of War and Revolution. Manchester: Manchester University Press.
- Morrison, A. (2021). The Russian Conquest of Central Asia: A Study in Imperial Expansion, 1814–1914. Cambridge: Cambridge University Press.
- Reeves, M. (2022). Infrastructures of Empire in Central Asia. Kritika: Explorations in Russian and Eurasian History, 23(2), 364–370.
- Rywkin, M. (ed.). (1988). Russian Colonial Expansion to 1917. London: Mansell Publishing.

=== Soviet era ===
- Cameron, S. (2018). The Hungry Steppe: Famine, Violence, and the Making of Soviet Kazakhstan. Ithaca: Cornell University Press.
- Chaqueri, C. (1995). The Soviet Socialist Republic of Iran, 1920-1921: Birth of the Trauma. Pittsburgh, PA: University of Pittsburgh Press.
- Khalid, A. (1996). Tashkent 1917: Muslim Politics in Revolutionary Turkestan. Slavic Review, 55(2), pp. 270–296.
- ———. (2000). The Politics of Muslim Cultural Reform: Jadidism in Central Asia. New York, NY: Oxford University Press. (Note: See Jadid.)
- ———. (2001). Nationalizing the Revolution in Central Asia: The Transformation of Jadidism, 1917–1920. In Suny, R. G. and Martin, T. (Eds.). A State of Nations: Empire and Nation-Making in the Age of Lenin and Stalin. (pp. 145–164). New York, NY: Oxford University Press.
- ———. (2006). Between Empire and Revolution: New Work on Soviet Central Asia. Kritika: Explorations in Russian and Eurasian History, 7(4), pp. 865–884.
- ———. (2015). Making Uzbekistan: Nation, Empire, and Revolution in the Early USSR. Ithaca, NY: Cornell University Press.
- Marwat, F. R. K. (1985). The Basmachi Movement in Soviet Central Asia: A Study in Political Development. Peshawar: Emjay Books International.
- Massell, G. J. (1974). The Surrogate Proletariat: Moslem Women and Revolutionary Strategies in Soviet Central Asia, 1919–1929. Princeton, NJ: Princeton University Press.
- Park, A. G. (1957). Bolshevism in Turkestan 1917-1927. New York, NY: Columbia University Press.
- Sabol, Steven. (1995). The Creation of Soviet Central Asia: The 1924 National Delimitation. Central Asian Survey, 14(2), pp. 225–241.
- Sareen, T. R. (1989). British Intervention in Central Asia and Trans-Caucasia. New Delhi, India: Anmol Publications.
- Sokol, E. D. (1954/2016). The Revolt of 1916 in Russian Central Asia. Baltimore, MD: Johns Hopkins University Press.
- [Togan, Zeki Velidi. Memoirs: National Existence and Cultural Struggles of Turkistan https://www.academia.edu/1525786/Prof_Zeki_Velidi_Togan_Memoirs_National_Existence_and_Cultural_Struggles_of_Turkistan_and_Other_Muslim_Eastern_Turks_2011_Full_Text_translation_from_the_1969_original]
- Vaidyanath, R. (1967). The Formation of the Soviet Central Asian Republics: A Study in Soviet Nationalities Policy, 1917–1936. New Delhi, India: People's Publishing House.

=== Post Soviet era ===
- Menon, R. (1995). In the Shadow of the Bear: Security in Post-Soviet Central Asia. International Security, 20(1), 149–181.
- Minahan, James. Miniature Empires: A Historical Dictionary of the Newly Independent States (Routledge, 1998) chapters on each country post 1991.

== Regional histories ==
=== Borderlands ===
- Keller, S. (2020). Russia and Central Asia: Coexistence, Conquest, Convergence. Toronto: University of Toronto Press.

=== National ===
==== Kazakhstan ====
- Abylkhozhin, Zhulduzbek, et al. eds. Stalinism in Kazakhstan: History, Memory, and Representation (2021). excerpt
- Adams, Margarethe. Steppe Dreams: Time, Mediation, and Postsocialist Celebrations in Kazakhstan (University of Pittsburgh Press, 2020).
- Cameron, Sarah. The hungry steppe: Famine, violence, and the making of Soviet Kazakhstan (Cornell University Press, 2018). online review
- Carmack, Roberto J. Kazakhstan in World War II: Mobilization and Ethnicity in the Soviet Empire (University Press of Kansas, 2019) online review
- Kaşıkçı, Mekhmet Volkan. "Living under Stalin's Rule in Kazakhstan." Kritika 23.4 (2022): 905–923. excerpt
- Kassenova, Togzhan. Atomic Steppe: How Kazakhstan Gave Up the Bomb (Stanford University Press, 2022).
- Michaels, P. A. (2000). Medical propaganda and cultural revolution in Soviet Kazakhstan, 1928–41. The Russian Review, 59(2), 159–178.
- Pianciola, Niccolò. "Nomads and the State in Soviet Kazakhstan." Oxford Research Encyclopedia of Asian History (2019), online.
- Pianciola, Niccolò. "Sacrificing the Qazaqs: The Stalinist Hierarchy of Consumption and the Great Famine of 1931–33 in Kazakhstan." Journal of Central Asian History 1.2 (2022): 225–272. online
- Ramsay, Rebekah. "Nomadic Hearths of Soviet Culture: ‘Women's Red Yurt’ Campaigns in Kazakhstan, 1925–1935." Europe-Asia Studies 73.10 (2021): 1937-1961.
- Toimbek, Diana. "Problems and perspectives of transition to the knowledge-based economy in Kazakhstan." Journal of the Knowledge Economy 13.2 (2022): 1088–1125.
- Tredinnick, Jeremy. An illustrated history of Kazakhstan : Asia's heartland in context (2014), popular history. online

==== Tajikistan ====
- Abdullaev, K. (2018). Historical dictionary of Tajikistan (3rd ed.). Rowman & Littlefield.
- Akiner, S. (2001). Tajikistan: Disintegration or reconciliation? Royal Institute of International Affairs.
- Atkin, M. (1989). The subtlest battle: Islam in Soviet Tajikistan. Foreign Policy Research Institute.
- Bergne, P. (2007). The birth of Tajikistan: National identity and the origins of the republic. I.B. Tauris.
- Bliss, F. (2006). Social and economic change in the Pamirs (Gorno-Badakhshan, Tajikistan) (N. Pacult & S. Guss, Trans.). Routledge.
- Boboyorov, H. (2013). Collective identities and patronage networks in southern Tajikistan. LIT Verlag.
- Borisova, E. (2024). Paradoxes of migration in Tajikistan: Locating the good life. UCL Press.
- Dagiev, D., & Faucher, C. (Eds.). (2018). Identity, history and trans-nationality in Central Asia: The mountain communities of Pamir. Routledge.
- Djalili, M.-R., Grare, F., & Akiner, S. (Eds.). (1997). Tajikistan: The trials of independence. St. Martin's Press.
- Epkenhans, T. (2016). The origins of the civil war in Tajikistan: Nationalism, Islamism, and violent conflict in post-Soviet space. Lexington Books.
- Foltz, R. (2019). A history of the Tajiks: Iranians of the East. I.B. Tauris.
- Harris, C. (2004). Control and subversion: Gender relations in Tajikistan. Pluto Press.
- Harris, C. (2006). Muslim youth: Tensions and transitions in Tajikistan. Westview Press.
- Heathershaw, J. (2009). Post-conflict Tajikistan: The politics of peacebuilding and the emergence of legitimate order. Routledge.
- Heathershaw, J., & Herzig, E. (Eds.). (2013). The transformation of Tajikistan: The sources of statehood. Routledge.
- Jonson, L. (2006). Tajikistan in the new Central Asia: Geopolitics, great power rivalry and radical Islam. I.B. Tauris.
- Kalinovsky, A. M. (2018). Laboratory of socialist development: Cold War politics and decolonization in Soviet Tajikistan. Cornell University Press.
- Kassymbekova, B. (2016). Despite cultures: Early Soviet rule in Tajikistan. University of Pittsburgh Press.
- Laruelle, M. (Ed.). (2018). Tajikistan on the move: Statebuilding and societal transformations. Lexington Books.
- Levi-Sanchez, S. (2016). The Afghan-Central Asia borderland: The state and local leaders. Routledge.
- Mostowlansky, T. (2017). Azan on the moon: Entangling modernity along Tajikistan's Pamir Highway. University of Pittsburgh Press.
- Nourzhanov, K., & Bleuer, C. (2013). Tajikistan: A political and social history. ANU Press.
- Olcott, M. B. (2012). Tajikistan's difficult development path. Carnegie Endowment for International Peace.
- Rakowska-Harmstone, T. (1970). Russia and nationalism in Central Asia: The case of Tadzhikistan. Johns Hopkins Press.
- Roche, S. (2014). Domesticating youth: Youth bulges and their socio-political implications in Tajikistan. Berghahn Books.
- Scarborough, I. M. (2023). Moscow's heavy shadow: The violent collapse of the USSR. Cornell University Press.
- Thibault, H. (2018). Transforming Tajikistan: State building and Islam in post-Soviet Central Asia. I.B. Tauris.

==== Turkmenistan ====
- Hein, Olivier (2026). Mother of the World: The Remarkable History of Turkmenistan. Hurst Publishers.

==== Uzbekistan ====
- Khalid, A. (2015). Making Uzbekistan: Nation, Empire, and Revolution in the Early USSR. Ithaca, NY: Cornell University Press.

=== Other ===
- Khalid, A. (1996). Tashkent 1917: Muslim Politics in Revolutionary Turkestan. Slavic Review, 55(2), pp. 270–296.

== Topical studies ==
=== Religion ===
- Balci, Bayram (2018). Islam in Central Asia and the Caucasus Since the Fall of the Soviet Union. Oxford: Oxford University Press.
- Baldick, Julian (2012). Animal and Shaman: Ancient Religions of Central Asia. New York: New York University Press.

==== Family and marriage ====
- Edgar, A., & Frommer, B. (Eds.). (2020). Intermarriage from Central Europe to Central Asia: Mixed Families in the Age of Extremes. Lincoln: University of Nebraska Press.

==== Gender and sexuality ====
- Sultanova, R. (2011). From Shamanism to Sufism: Women, Islam, and Culture in Central Asia. London: I.B. Tauris.

=== Violence, terror, and famine ===
- Martin, T. (1998). The Origins of Soviet Ethnic Cleansing. The Journal of Modern History, 70(4), 813–861.

=== Economics and trade ===
- Beckwith, C. I. (2009). Empires of the Silk Road: A History of Central Eurasia from the Bronze Age to the Present. Princeton: Princeton University Press.
- Frankopan, P. (2016). The Silk Roads: A New History of the World. London: Bloomsbury.
- Hansen, V. (2012). The Silk Road: A New History. Oxford: Oxford University Press.
- Pomfret, R. (2019). The Central Asian Economies in the Twenty-First Century: Paving a New Silk Road. Princeton: Princeton University Press.
- Wood, F. (2002). The Silk Road: Two Thousand Years in the Heart of Asia. Berkeley: University of California Press.

=== Other ===
- Buell, P. D., Anderson, E. N., de Pablo Moya, M., & Oskenbay, M. (2020). Crossroads of Cuisine: The Eurasian Heartland, the Silk Roads and Food. Leiden: Brill.
- Pickett, J. (2020). Polymaths of Islam: Power and Networks of Knowledge in Central Asia. Ithaca: Cornell University Press.

== Other studies ==
- Bruno, A. (2022). An Anthropocene History of Central Asia. Kritika: Explorations in Russian and Eurasian History, 23(2), 339–344.
- Lajus, J. (2022). Aridity and the History of Water in Central Asia and Beyond. Kritika: Explorations in Russian and Eurasian History, 23(2), 358–363.

== Academic journals ==
- Central Asian Survey (1982–present); published quarterly by Taylor & Francis; ISSN 0263-4937 (print), ISSN 1465-3354 (online).
- Journal of Borderlands Studies (1986–present); five issues per year published by Taylor & Francis for the Association for Borderlands Studies; ISSN 0886-5655 (print), ISSN 2159-1229 (online).

== See also ==
- Bibliography of Afghanistan
- Bibliography of the history of the Caucasus
- Bibliography of Russian history
- Bibliography of the Soviet Union (disambiguation)
- Soviet Central Asia
