= Bibliography of Belarusian history =

This is a select bibliography of English language books (including translations) and journal articles about the history of Belarus.

The territory of modern-day Belarus was once part of Kievan Rus' and later divided among regional principalities such as Polotsk, Turov, and Vitebsk. After the 13th-century Mongol invasions, these lands were incorporated into the Grand Duchy of Lithuania, which eventually united with Poland to form the Polish–Lithuanian Commonwealth. In the late 18th century, the Partitions of Poland brought Belarusian lands under control of the Russian Empire. Following the Russian Revolution and ensuing civil war, the Byelorussian Soviet Socialist Republic was established and joined the Soviet Union in 1922. Belarus’s union with Russia began with its incorporation into the Russian Empire following the Partitions of Poland in the late 18th century, marking the end of independent Belarusian political structures. Although Belarus briefly experienced competing national movements during and after the Russian Revolution, the eventual formation of the Byelorussian Soviet Socialist Republic and its inclusion in the Soviet Union in 1922 led to a further loss of sovereignty. While nominally a republic, Belarus remained under tight control from Moscow throughout the Soviet era, with its political, economic, and cultural policies directed by Soviet authorities.

Works listed here are cited in the notes or bibliographies of scholarly sources. Each is published by an academic or major press, written by a recognized expert, or substantially reviewed in scholarly journals; borderline cases are omitted. A selection of primary sources are included. Many of the books below carry their own bibliographies; see the Further reading section for other bibliographies, and the External links section for historical sites, academic sites, and museums.

Citations follow APA style. (Note: Entries are in plain text APA 7 format without templates; templates are used only for reviews and notes.) Book have citations to academic journal or mainstream published reviews when available. For books only partly about the subject, relevant chapter or section titles are provided when useful and available. Translators of the original-language edition are included when possible. In cases where a title or name has appeared with more than one English spelling, the most recent published form is used and a footnote documents any earlier title under which the work appeared.

== General surveys ==
- Savchenko. (2009). Belarus: A Perpetual Borderland. Leiden: Brill.

== Regional studies ==
This sections contains works about Eastern Europe (Note: This article uses the United Nations definition for the Eastern Europe geographic region.) with significant content about Belarus.

- Applebaum, A. (2013). Iron Curtain. The Crushing of Eastern Europe 1944–56. New York: Penguin.
- Fritz, V. (2007). State-Building: A Comparative Study of Ukraine, Lithuania, Belarus, and Russia (1st ed.). Budapest: Central European University Press.
- Hoffman, E. (1993). Exit into History: A Journey Through the New Eastern Europe. New York: Viking Press.
- Howard, A. (Ed.). (1993). Constitution Making in Eastern Europe. Washington, D.C.: Woodrow Wilson Center Press.
- Kenney, P. P. (2013). The Burdens of Freedom: Eastern Europe since 1989 (Global History of the Present). London: Zed Books.
- Geremek, B. (1996). The Common Roots of Europe. Cambridge: Polity Press.
- Snyder, T. (2004). The Reconstruction of Nations: Poland, Ukraine, Lithuania, Belarus, 1569–1999. New Haven: Yale University Press.
- Ther, P. (2016). Europe Since 1989: A History (C. Hughes-Kreutzmüller, Trans.). Princeton: Princeton University Press.
- Wolff, L. (1994). Inventing Eastern Europe: The Map of Civilization on the Mind of the Enlightenment. Palo Alto: Stanford University Press.

=== Borderland studies ===
- Marples, D. R. (1985). Western Ukraine and Western Belorussia under Soviet Occupation: The Development of Socialist Farming, 1939-1941. Canadian Slavonic Papers / Revue Canadienne Des Slavistes, 27(2), 158–177.
- Rieber, A. J. (2014). The Struggle for the Eurasian Borderlands: From the Rise of Early Modern Empires to the End of the First World War. Cambridge: Cambridge University Press.
- Savchenko, A. (2009). Belarus: A perpetual borderland. Brill.
- Snyder, T. (2010). Bloodlands: Europe Between Hitler and Stalin. New York: Basic Books.
- Staliūnas, D. (2007). Between Russification and Divide and Rule: Russian Nationality Policy in the Western Borderlands in mid-19th Century. Jahrbücher Für Geschichte Osteuropas, 55(3), 357–373.
- Staliūnas, D., & Aoshima, Y., (eds.). (2021). The Tsar, the Empire, and the Nation: Dilemmas of Nationalization in Russia's Western Borderlands, 1905–1915. Historical Studies in Eastern Europe and Eurasia. Budapest: Central European University Press.
- Thaden, E. (1984). Russia's Western Borderlands, 1710-1980, Princeton, N.J.: Princeton University Press.
- Ther, P., & Kreutzmüller, C. (2014). The Dark Side of Nation-States: Ethnic Cleansing in Modern Europe. New York: Berghahn Books.
- Zaprudnik, J. (1993). Belarus: At a crossroads in history. Westview Press.

== Period studies ==
=== Early Slavs and Belarusians ===
- Bocek, V., Jansens, N., & Klir, T. (Eds.). (2020). New Perspectives on the Early Slavs and the Rise of Slavic: Contact and Migrations. Heidelberg: Universitatsverlag Winter.
- Dolukhanov, P. (2016). The Early Slavs: Eastern Europe from the Initial Settlement to the Kievan Rus. London: Routledge.I
- Dvornik, F. (1956). The Slavs: Their Early History and Civilization. Boston, MA: American Academy of Arts and Sciences.
- Halperin, C. J. (2010). National Identity in Premodern Rus'. Russian History, 37(3), 275–294.
- Plokhy, S. (2010). The Origins of the Slavic Nations: Premodern Identities in Russia, Ukraine, and Belarus. Cambridge, UK: Cambridge University Press.
- Pritsak, O. (1991). The Origin of Rus. Cambridge MA: Harvard University Press.

=== Pre-Soviet times ===
- Blum, J. (1971). Lord and Peasant in Russia from the Ninth to the Nineteenth Century. Princeton, NJ: Princeton University Press.

=== Soviet Byelorussia ===
- Chernyshova, N. (2023). Between Soviet and Ethnic: Cultural Policies and National Identity Building in Soviet Belarus under Petr Masherau, 1965–80. Kritika: Explorations in Russian and Eurasian History 24(3), 545-584.
- Exeler, F. (2022). Ghosts of War: Nazi Occupation and Its Aftermath in Soviet Belarus. Cornell University Press.
- Lubachko, Ivan (1972). Belorussia under Soviet Rule, 1917–1957. University Press of Kentucky.
- Maksymiuk, J. (2003). Belarus: Freedom to Submit. Foreign Policy, 139, 35–37.
- Rudling, P. A. (2014). The rise and fall of Belarusian nationalism, 1906–1931. University of Pittsburgh Press.
- Snyder, T. (2010). Bloodlands: Europe Between Hitler and Stalin. New York: Basic Books.
- Urban, M. (2009). An Algebra of Soviet Power: Elite Circulation in the Belorussian Republic 1966-86 (Cambridge Russian, Soviet and Post-Soviet Studies). Cambridge: Cambridge University Press.

==== World War II ====
- Marples, D. R. (2014). Our glorious past: Lukashenka’s Belarus and the Great Patriotic War. Columbia University Press.

==== The Holocaust ====
- Bartov, O. (2008). Eastern Europe as the Site of Genocide. The Journal of Modern History, 80(3), 557–593.
- Beorn, W. W. (2014). Marching into Darkness: The Wehrmacht and the Holocaust in Belarus. Harvard University Press.
- Gaunt, D., Levine, P. A., & Palosuo, L. (2004). Collaboration and Resistance During the Holocaust: Belarus, Estonia, Latvia, Lithuania. Peter Lang.
- Walke, A. (2018). Split Memory: The Geography of Holocaust Memory and Amnesia in Belarus. Slavic Review, 77(1), 174–197.

==== Chernobyl ====
- Antanovich, I. J. (1996). Letter from Belarus: legacy of the Chernobyl nuclear incident. Environmental Conservation, 23(4), 287–288.
- Zhukova, E. (2017). Foreign aid and identity after the Chernobyl nuclear disaster: How Belarus shapes relations with Germany, Europe, Russia, and Japan. Cooperation and Conflict, 52(4), 485–501.

=== Independent Belarus ===
- Bennett, B. (2011). Last Dictatorship in Europe: Belarus Under Lukashenko. Oxford University Press.
- Frear, M. (2018). Belarus under Lukashenka: Adaptive Authoritarianism (Routledge Series on Russian and East European Studies). London: Routledge.
- Ioffe, G. (2008). Understanding Belarus and how Western foreign policy misses the mark. Rowman & Littlefield.
- Jarábik, B. (2006). Belarus Today: Country between East and West. International Issues & Slovak Foreign Policy Affairs, 15(2), 10–17.
- Marples, D. (2014). Our Glorious Past: Lukashenka's Belarus and the Great Patriotic War. Stuttgart: ibidem Press, Columbia University Press.
- Motlagh, J. (2011). Dark Days in Belarus: Surviving the Soviet Hangover in the former USSR's last dictatorship. The Virginia Quarterly Review, 87(4), 70–93.
- Nesvetailov, G. (1995). Changing Centre-Periphery Relations in the Former Soviet Republics: The Case of Belarus. Social Studies of Science, 25(4), 853–871.
- Silitski, V. (2006). Still Soviet? Why Dictatorship Persists in Belarus. Harvard International Review, 28(1), 46–53.
- Wilson, A. (2012). Belarus: The Last European Dictatorship. Yale University Press.

==== Russia-Belarus Union ====
- Deyermond, R. (2004). The State of the Union: Military Success, Economic and Political Failure in the Russia-Belarus Union. Europe-Asia Studies, 56(8), 1191–1205.
- Frear, M. (2018). Belarus under Lukashenka: Adaptive authoritarianism. Routledge. doi:10.4324/9780203737910
- Koktysh, K. (2006). The Belarusian Policy of Russia: the Era of Pragmatism. International Issues & Slovak Foreign Policy Affairs, 15(2), 18–29.
- Marples, D. R. (2025). The creation of a dictator: The path to the Lukashenka presidency in Belarus. Journal of Belarusian Studies, 13(2), 103–125. doi:10.30965/20526512-bja10021

== Topical studies ==
- Abstracts: Contours and Contrasts. A Closer Look at Belarus. (2004). Osteuropa, 54(2), 256–260.
- Eke, S. M., & Kuzio, T. (2000). Sultanism in Eastern Europe: The Socio-Political Roots of Authoritarian Populism in Belarus. Europe-Asia Studies, 52(3), 523–547.

=== Political ===
- Balmaceda, M. M. (2014). Living the High Life in Minsk: Russian Energy Rents, Domestic Populism and Belarus' Impending Crisis (New edition). Central European University Press.
- Korosteleva, Elena A. (2016). The European Union and Belarus: Democracy promotion by technocratic means?. Democratization. 23(4): 678–698.
- Leshchenko, N. (2008). The National Ideology and the Basis of the Lukashenka Regime in Belarus. Europe-Asia Studies', 60(8), 1419–1433.
- Marples, D. R. (2006). Color Revolutions: The Belarus case. Communist and Post-Communist Studies, 39(3), 351–364.
- Nikolayenko, O. (2007). Web Cartoons in a Closed Society: Animal Farm as an Allegory of Post-Communist Belarus. PS: Political Science and Politics, 40(2), 307–310.
- Sannikov, A. (2006). Belarus: Dictatorship in the EU Neighborhood. International Issues & Slovak Foreign Policy Affairs', 15(2), 3–9.

=== Social ===
- Tomiak, J. (1992). Education in the Baltic States, Ukraine, Belarus' and Russia. Comparative Education, 28(1), 33–44.
- Vashchilko, A. (2014). Household Expenditure Patterns, Equivalence Scales, and Poverty in Belarus. Eastern European Economics, 52(6), 92–108.

=== Violence and terror ===
- Demaret, L. (2002). Clampdown in Belarus. International Union Rights, 9(1), 19–19.
- Martin, T. (1998). The Origins of Soviet Ethnic Cleansing. The Journal of Modern History, 70(4), 813–861.
- Shaton, G. (2009). Academic Freedom in Belarus. Social Research, 76(2), 615–618.
- Vanderhill, R. (2014). Promoting Democracy and Promoting Authoritarianism: Comparing the Cases of Belarus and Slovakia. Europe-Asia Studies, 66(2), 255–283.

=== Religion ===
- Titarenko, L. (2010). Religious Pluralism in Post-communist Eastern Europe: The Case of Belarus. Anthropological Journal of European Cultures, 19(1), 40–53.

=== Economics ===
- Li, Y., & Cheng, E. (2020). Market Socialism in Belarus: An Alternative to China's Socialist Market Economy. World Review of Political Economy, 11(4), 428–454.
- Nuti, D. M. (2000). Belarus: A Command Economy without Central Planning. Russian & East European Finance and Trade, 36(4), 45–79.
- Yarashevich, V. (2014). Post-communist Economic Integration: Belarus, Kazakhstan, and Russia. Journal of Economic Integration, 29(4), 582–623.

=== Rural studies and agriculture ===
- Smilovitsky, L. (1997). The Jewish Farmers In Belarus During The 1920s. Jewish Political Studies Review, 9(1/2), 59–71.

=== Urban studies and industry ===
- Under construction

== Historiography, identity, and memory studies ==
=== Historiography ===
- Wolff, L. (2006). Revising Eastern Europe: Memory and the Nation in Recent Historiography. The Journal of Modern History, 78(1), 93–118.

=== Identity and language ===
- Bekus, N. (2010). Struggle over Identity: The Official and the Alternative “Belarusianness” (Illustrated edition). Budapest: Central European University Press.
- Brown, T. (2013). Key Indicators of Language Impact on Identity Formation in Belarus. Russian Language Journal / Русский Язык, 63, 247–288.
- Burant, S. R. (1995). Foreign Policy and National Identity: A Comparison of Ukraine and Belarus. Europe-Asia Studies, 47(7), 1125–1144.
- Halperin, C. J. (2010). National Identity in Premodern Rus'. Russian History, 37(3), 275–294.
- Ioffe, G. (2003). Understanding Belarus: Belarusian Identity. Europe-Asia Studies', 55(8), 1241–1272.
- Ioffe, G. (2003). Understanding Belarus: Questions of Language. Europe-Asia Studies', 55(7), 1009–1047.
- Klinke, I. (2008). Geopolitical Narratives on Belarus in Contemporary Russia. Perspectives, 16(1), 109–131.
- Rudling, P. A. (2014). The Rise and Fall of Belarusian Nationalism, 1906–1931. University of Pittsburgh Press.

=== Memory studies ===
- Marples, D. (2014). Our Glorious Past: Lukashenka's Belarus and the Great Patriotic War. Stuttgart: ibidem Press, Columbia University Press.
- Walke, A. (2018). Split Memory: The Geography of Holocaust Memory and Amnesia in Belarus. Slavic Review, 77(1), 174–197.

== Biographies and memoirs ==
- Shushkevich, Stanislav (2012). Моя жизнь, крушение и воскрешение СССР. ISBN 978-5-8243-1708-4.

== Primary sources ==
- Belarus Republic-Russian Federation: Treaty On The Formation Of The Community Of Belarus And Russia. (1996). International Legal Materials, 35(5), 1190–1194.

== See also ==
- Bibliography of the history of Poland
- Bibliography of Russian history
- Bibliography of the Soviet Union
- Bibliography of Ukrainian history
