= Bibliography of the history of the Caucasus =

Caucasus
- Topography of the Caucasus
- Coordinates: 42°45′N 44°30′E
- Countries: Armenia; Azerbaijan; Georgia; Russia
- Demonym: Caucasian
- Time Zones: UTC+03:00 and UTC+04:00
- Highest mountain: Elbrus (5,642 m (18,510 ft))

This is a select bibliography of English language books (including translations) and journal articles about the history of the Caucasus. (Note: This article uses the United Nations geoscheme for borders and regions.)

Works listed here are cited in the notes or bibliographies of scholarly sources. Each is published by an academic or major press, written by a recognized expert, or substantially reviewed in scholarly journals; borderline cases are omitted. A selection of primary sources are included. Many of the books below carry their own bibliographies; see the Further reading section for other bibliographies, and the External links section for historical sites, academic sites, and museums.

Citations follow APA style. (Note: Entries are in plain text APA 7 format without templates; templates are used only for reviews and notes.) Book have citations to academic journal or mainstream published reviews when available. For books only partly about the subject, relevant chapter or section titles are provided when useful and available. Translators of the original-language edition are included when possible. In cases where a title or name has appeared with more than one English spelling, the most recent published form is used and a footnote documents any earlier title under which the work appeared.

== General surveys ==
- De Waal, T. (2020). The Caucasus: An Introduction. Oxford: Oxford University Press.
- Forsyth, James (2013). The Caucasus: A History. Cambridge: Cambridge University Press.
- King, C. (2012). The Ghost of Freedom: A History of the Caucasus. New York, NY: Oxford University Press.

== Pre-colonial era ==
- Under construction

=== Russian imperial era ===
- Brisku, A. & Blauvelt, T. K. (Eds.) (2021). The Transcaucasian Democratic Federative Republic of 1918: Federal Aspirations, Geopolitics and National Projects. London: Routledge.
- Kazemzadeh, F. (1951). The Struggle for Transcaucasia (1917–1921). New York City: Philosophical Library.

=== Soviet era ===
- Marshall, A. (2010). The Caucasus Under Soviet Rule. New York City, NY: Routledge.
- Nahaylo, B., & Swoboda, V. (1990). Soviet Disunion: A History of the Nationalities Problem in the USSR. London, UK: Hamilton.
- Saparov, A (2015). From Conflict to Autonomy in the Caucasus: The Soviet Union and the making of Abkhazia, South Ossetia and Nagorno Karabakh. New York City, NY: Routledge.

=== Post-Soviet era ===
- Zürcher, C. (2007). The Post-Soviet Wars: Rebellion, Ethnic Conflict, and Nationhood in the Caucasus, New York City: New York University Press.

== Regions ==
=== Armenia ===
- Hovannisian, R. G. (1967). Armenia on the Road to Independence, 1918. Berkeley: University of California Press.
- Hovannisian, R. G. (Ed.) (1997). The Armenian People from Ancient to Modern Times, Volume I: The Dynastic Periods: From Antiquity to the Fourteenth Century. New York: St. Martin's Press.
- Hovannisian, R. G. (Ed.) (2012). The Armenian People From Ancient Times to Modern Times, Volume II: Foreign Dominion to Statehood: The Fifteenth Century to the Twentieth Century. Houndmills, Basingstoke, Hampshire: MacMillan.
- Laycock, J. & Piana, F. (2020) Aid to Armenia: Humanitarianism and Intervention from the 1890s to the Present'. Manchester: Manchester University Press.
- Riegg, S. B. (2020). Russia's Entangled Embrace: The Tsarist Empire and the Armenians, 1801–1914. Ithaca: Cornell University Press, Ithaca.

=== Azerbaijan ===
- Altstadt, A. L. (1992). The Azerbaijani Turks: Power and Identity under Russian Rule. Stanford, California: Hoover Institution Press.
- Bolubaksi, S. (2011. Azerbaijan: A Political History. London: I.B. Taurus.
- Hasanli, J. (2016). Foreign Policy of the Republic of Azerbaijan: The Difficult Road to Western Integration, 1918–1920. New York City: Routledge.
- Swietochowski, T. (2010). Russian Azerbaijan, 1905-1920: The Shaping of a National Identity in a Muslim Community (Cambridge Russian, Soviet and Post-Soviet Studies). Cambridge: Cambridge University Press.

=== Black Sea ===
- King, Charles (2005). The Black Sea: A History. Oxford: Oxford University Press.

=== Caspian Sea ===
- Under construction

=== Chechnya ===
- Under construction

=== Dagestan ===
- Chenciner, Robert. (1997). Dagestan: Tradition and Survival. New York: Palgrave MacMillan.
- Chenciner, Robert & Magomedkhanov Magomedkhan. (2023). Dagestan - History, Culture, Identity. New York: Routledge.

=== Georgia ===
- Asmus, R. D. (2010). A Little War that Shook the World: Georgia, Russia, and the Future of the West. New York: Palgrave MacMillan.
- Blauvelt, T. K. & Smith, J. (Eds.) (2016). Georgia After Stalin: Nationalism and Soviet Power. London: Routledge.
- Coppieteres, B. & Legvold, R. (Eds.) (2005). Statehood and Security: Georgia after the Rose Revolution. Cambridge, Massachusetts: MIT Press.
- Cornell, S. E. & Starr, S. F. (Eds.) (2009). The Guns of August 2008: Russia's War in Georgia. Armonk, New York: M. E. Sharpe.
- Hewitt, G. (2013). Discordant Neighbours: A Reassessment of the Georgian-Abkhazian and Georgian-South Ossetian Conflicts. Leiden, The Netherlands: Brill.
- Hewitt, George (Ed.). The Abkhazians: A Handbook. New York City: St. Martin's Press.
- Jones, S. (2013). Georgia: A Political History Since Independence. London: I. B. Taurus.
- Jones, S. F. (2005). Socialism in Georgian Colors: The European Road to Social Democracy 1883–191. Cambridge, Massachusetts: Harvard University Press.
- Jones, S. F. (Ed.). The Making of Modern Georgia, 1918–2012: The first Georgian Republic and its successors. New York City: Routledge.
- Lang, D. M. (1962). A Modern History of Soviet Georgia. New York: Grove Press.
- Lang, D. M. (1957). The Last Years of the Georgian Monarchy: 1658–1832. New York City: Columbia University Press.
- Lee, E. (2017). The Experiment: Georgia's Forgotten Revolution, 1918–1921. London: Zed Books.
- McGiffert Ekedahl, C. & Goodman, M. A. (1997). The Wars of Eduard Shevardnadze. London: Hurst & Company.
- Mitchell, L. (2009) Uncertain Democracy: U.S. Foreign Policy and Georgia's Rose Revolution. Philadelphia: University of Pennsylvania Press.
- Rayfield, D. (2012). Edge of Empires: A History of Georgia. London: Reaktion Books.
- Scott, E. (2017). Familiar Strangers: The Georgian Diaspora and the Evolution of Soviet Empire. New York, NY: Oxford University Press.
- Suny, R. G. (1994). The Making of the Georgian Nation (Second ed.). Bloomington, Indiana: Indiana University Press.
- Trier, T., Lohm, H. & Szakonyi, D. (2010). Under Siege: Inter-Ethnic Relations in Abkhazia. New York: Columbia University Press.

=== North Caucasus ===
- Hamed-Troyansky, Vladimir (2024). Empire of Refugees: North Caucasian Muslims and the Late Ottoman State. Stanford, CA: Stanford University Press. ISBN 978-1-5036-3696-5.
- Hamed-Troyansky, V. (2023). Welcome, Not Welcome: The North Caucasian Diaspora's Attempted Return to Russia since the 1960s. Kritika: Explorations in Russian and Eurasian History 24(3), 585-610.

=== Other ===
- Richmond, Walter (2008). The Northwest Caucasus: Past, Present, Future. New York: Routledge.

== Topical ==
- Forestier-Peyrat, E. (2017). Soviet Federalism at Work: Lessons from the History of the Transcaucasian Federation, 1922–1936. Jahrbücher Für Geschichte Osteuropas, 65(4), pp. 529–559.

=== The arts and culture ===
- Under construction

=== Famine, violence and terror ===
- Balakian, P. (2004). The Burning Tigris: The Armenian Genocide and America’s Response. Harper Perennial.
- Dédéyan, G., Demirdjian, A., & Saleh, N. (2023). The Righteous and People of Conscience of the Armenian Genocide (B. Mellor, Trans.). Hurst.
- Morris, B., & Ze’evi, D. (2019). The Thirty-Year Genocide: Turkey’s Destruction of Its Christian Minorities, 1894–1924. Harvard University Press.
- Suny, R. G. (2015). “They Can Live in the Desert but Nowhere Else”: A History of the Armenian Genocide (First Edition). Princeton University Press.

=== Religion and philosophy ===
- Under construction

==== Christianity ====
- Under construction

==== Islam ====
- Balci, Bayram (2018). Islam in Central Asia and the Caucasus Since the Fall of the Soviet Union. Oxford: Oxford University Press.

==== Judaism ====
- Under construction

=== Rural studies and agriculture ===
- Under construction

=== Urban studies and industry ===
- Under construction

=== Armenia–Azerbaijan conflict ===
- Under construction

== Biographies ==
- Under construction

=== Other ===
- Blauvelt, T. K. (2021). Clientelism and Nationality in an Early Soviet Fiefdom: The Trials of Nestor Lakoba. London: Routledge.
- Roobol, W. H. (1976). Tsereteli – A Democrat in the Russian Revolution: A Political Biography. Translated by Hyams, P. and Richards, L. The Hague: Martinus Nijhoff.

== Historiography and memory studies ==
- Kotljarchuk, A., & Sundström, O. (2017). Ethnic and Religious Minorities in Stalin's Soviet Union: New Dimensions of Research. Huddinge: Södertörn University.

=== Memory studies ===
- Under construction

=== Identity studies ===
- Under construction

== Other works ==
- Lee, E. (2020). Night of the Bayonets: The Texel Uprising and Hitler's Revenge, April–May 1945. Barnsley: Greenhill Books.

== Reference works ==
- Under construction

== English language translations of primary sources ==
- Under construction

== Academic journals ==
- Journal of Baltic Studies (1970–present); four issues per year published by Taylor & Francis for the Association for the Advancement of Baltic Studies; ISSN 0162-9778 (print), ISSN 1751-7877 (online).
- Journal of Borderlands Studies (1986–present); five issues per year published by Taylor & Francis for the Association for Borderlands Studies; ISSN 0886-5655 (print), ISSN 2159-1229 (online).

== See also ==
- Bibliography of Russian history
- Bibliography of the Soviet Union
- Bibliography of Ukrainian history
- Bibliography of the history of Central Asia
