= Bibliography of the Soviet Union during World War II =

This is a select bibliography of English language books (including translations) and journal articles about the Soviet Union during the Second World War, the period leading up to the war, and the immediate aftermath. For works on Stalinism and the history of the Soviet Union during the Stalin era, please see Bibliography of Stalinism and the Soviet Union.

Works listed here are cited in the notes or bibliographies of scholarly sources. Each is published by an academic or major press, written by a recognized expert, or substantially reviewed in scholarly journals; borderline cases are omitted. A selection of primary sources are included. Many of the books below carry their own bibliographies; see the Further reading section for other bibliographies, and the External links section for historical sites, academic sites, and museums.

Citations follow APA style. (Note: Entries are in plain text APA 7 format without templates; templates are used only for reviews and notes.) Book have citations to academic journal or mainstream published reviews when available. For books only partly about the subject, relevant chapter or section titles are provided when useful and available. Translators of the original-language edition are included when possible. In cases where a title or name has appeared with more than one English spelling, the most recent published form is used and a footnote documents any earlier title under which the work appeared.

== General works ==
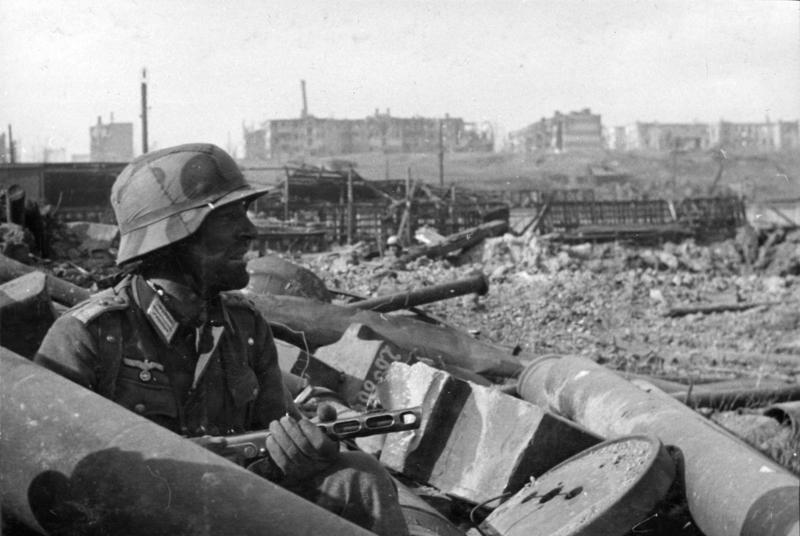
Stalingrad

- Buttar, P. (2015). Between Giants: The Battle for the Baltics in World War II. Oxford: Osprey Publishing.
- David-Fox, M., Holquist, P., & Martin, A. M. (2012). Fascination and Enmity: Russia and Germany as entangled histories, 1914–1945. Pittsburgh: University of Pittsburgh Press.
- Glantz, D. M. (2014). Stalin’s Strategic Intentions, 1941–1945: Soviet Military Operations as Indicators of Stalin’s Postwar Territorial Ambitions. The Journal of Slavic Military Studies, 27(4), 676–720.
- Goldman, S. D. (2013). Nomonhan, 1939: The Red Army's Victory that Shaped World War II. Annapolis, MD: Naval Institute Press.
- Harrison, M. (2009). Soviet Planning in Peace and War, 1938-1945 (Cambridge Russian, Soviet and Post-Soviet Studies). Cambridge: Cambridge University Press.
- Harrison, M. (2010). Accounting for War: Soviet Production, Employment, and the Defence Burden, 1940-1945 (Cambridge Russian, Soviet and Post-Soviet Studies). Cambridge: Cambridge University Press.
- Hill, A. (2017). The Red Army and the Second World War. Cambridge: Cambridge University Press.
- Linz, S. J. (1985). The Impact of World War II on the Soviet Union. Totowa: Rowman & Allanheld.
- Merridale, C. (2007). Ivan's War: Life and Death in the Red Army, 1939–1945. New York: Metropolitan Books.
- Noggle, A. (2007). A Dance with Death: Soviet Airwomen in World War II. College Station: Texas A&M University Press.
- Rieber, A. J. (2022). Stalin as Warlord. New Haven: Yale University Press.
- Roberts, G. (2011). Stalin's Wars: From World War to Cold War, 1939-1953. New Haven: Yale University Press.
- Roberts, G. (2008). Stalin's Victory?: The Soviet Union and World War II. History Ireland, 16(1), 42–48.
- Shearer, D. (2018). Stalin at War, 1918-1953: Patterns of Violence and Foreign Threat. Jahrbücher Für Geschichte Osteuropas, 66(2), 188–217.
- Weiner, A. (2012). Making Sense of War: The Second World War and the Fate of the Bolshevik Revolution. Princeton: Princeton University Press.

== Spanish Civil War ==
- Beevor, A. (2014). The Battle for Spain: The Spanish Civil War 1936–1939. New York: Penguin Books.
- Cox, Geoffrey (1937). Defence of Madrid. Victor Gollancz, London, ISBN 978-1-877372-38-4 (2006 Otago University Press edition)
- Hooton, E. R. (2019). Spain in Arms: A Military History of the Spanish Civil War 1936–1939. Philadelphia, PA: Casemate Books.
- Krammer, A. (1973). Spanish Volunteers against Bolshevism: The Blue Division. The Russian Review, 32(4), 388–402.
- Payne, S. G. (2012). The Spanish Civil War. Cambridge: Cambridge University Press.
- Preston, P. (2016). The Spanish Civil War: Reaction, Revolution and Revenge. London: William Collins.
- Thomas, H. (1977). The Spanish Civil War. New York: HarperCollins.
- Volkova, I. (2020). Spanish Republicans' Struggle and Its Impact on the Soviet Wartime Generation. Kritika: Explorations in Russian and Eurasian History, 21(2), 327–346.

== The Nazi-Soviet alliance (1939—1941) ==
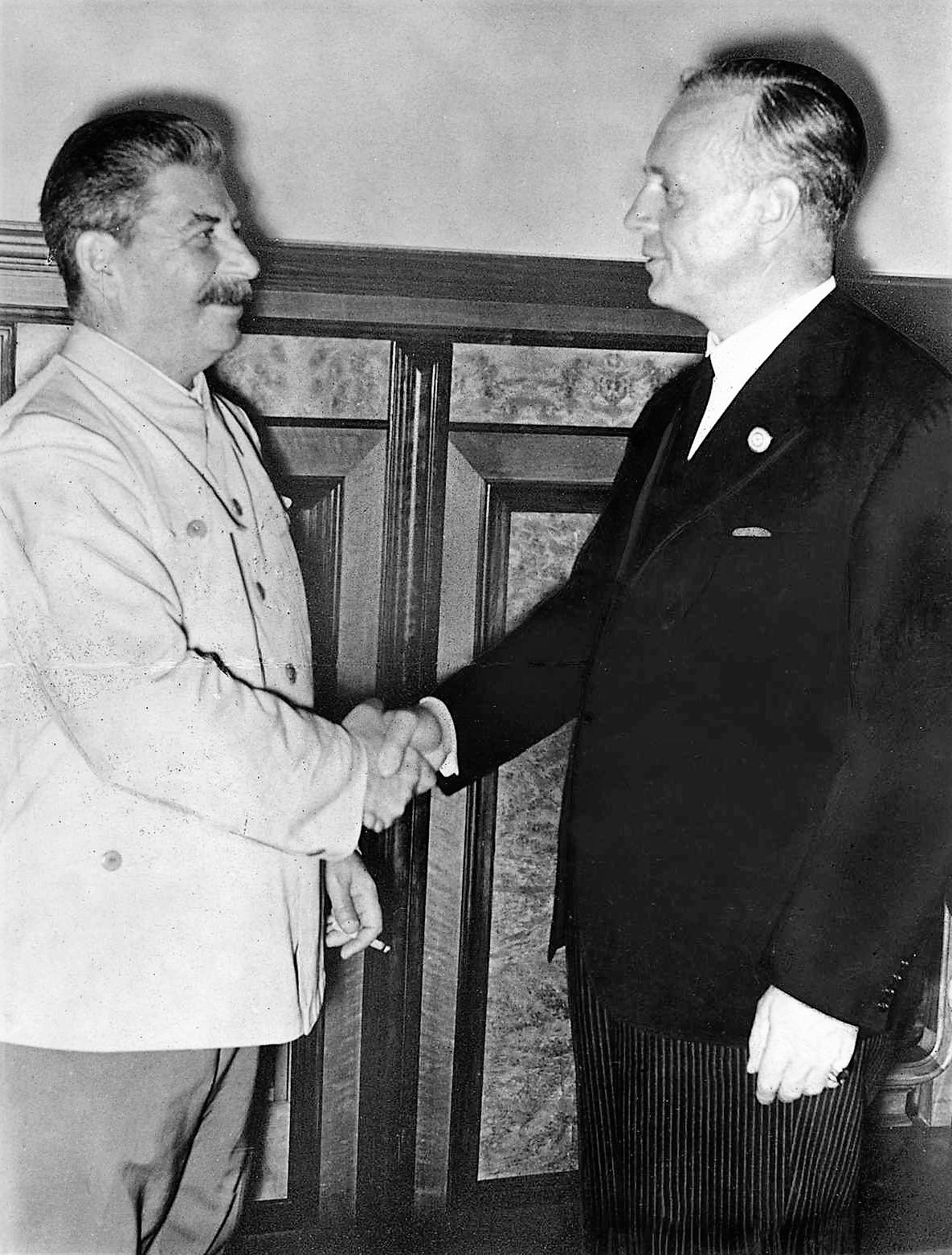
Stalin and Ribbentrop greeting each other in the Kremlin

- Cox, Geoffrey (1941). The Red Army Moves. London: Victor Gollancz. (report from Finland on the Winter War)
- Hiden, J., & Lane, T. (2011). The Baltic and the Outbreak of the Second World War. Cambridge: Cambridge University Press.
- Kornat, M. (2009). Choosing Not to Choose in 1939: Poland's Assessment of the Nazi-Soviet Pact. The International History Review, 31(4), 771–797.
- Rentola, K. (2013). Intelligence and Stalin's Two Crucial Decisions in the Winter War, 1939–40. The International History Review, 35(5), 1089–1112.
- Moorhouse, R. (2014). The Devils' Alliance: Hitler's Pact with Stalin, 1939–1941. New York: Basic Books.
- Moorhouse, R. (2020). Poland 1939: The Outbreak of World War II. New York: Basic Books.
- Roberts, G. (1990). The Unholy Alliance: Stalin's Pact with Hitler. Bloomington: Indiana University Press.
- Sanford, G. (2005). Katyn and the Soviet Massacre of 1940: Truth, Justice and Memory. New York: Routledge.
- Toczewski, A. (1992). Cooperation Between the Soviet Union and the Third Reich in Exchanges of Polish Population and Prisoners of War in the Years 1939-1941. The Polish Review, 37(2), 209–215.
- Uldricks, T. J. (1977). Stalin and Nazi Germany. Slavic Review, 36(4), 599–603.
- Uldricks, T. J. (1999). The Icebreaker Controversy: Did Stalin Plan to Attack Hitler?. Slavic Review, 58(3), 626–643.
- Watson, D. (2000). Molotov's Apprenticeship in Foreign Policy: The Triple Alliance Negotiations in 1939. Europe-Asia Studies, 52(4), 695–722.
- Watson, D. (2002). Molotov, The Making of the Grand Alliance and the Second Front 1939-1942. Europe-Asia Studies, 54(1), 51–85.

== Nazi–Soviet War ==
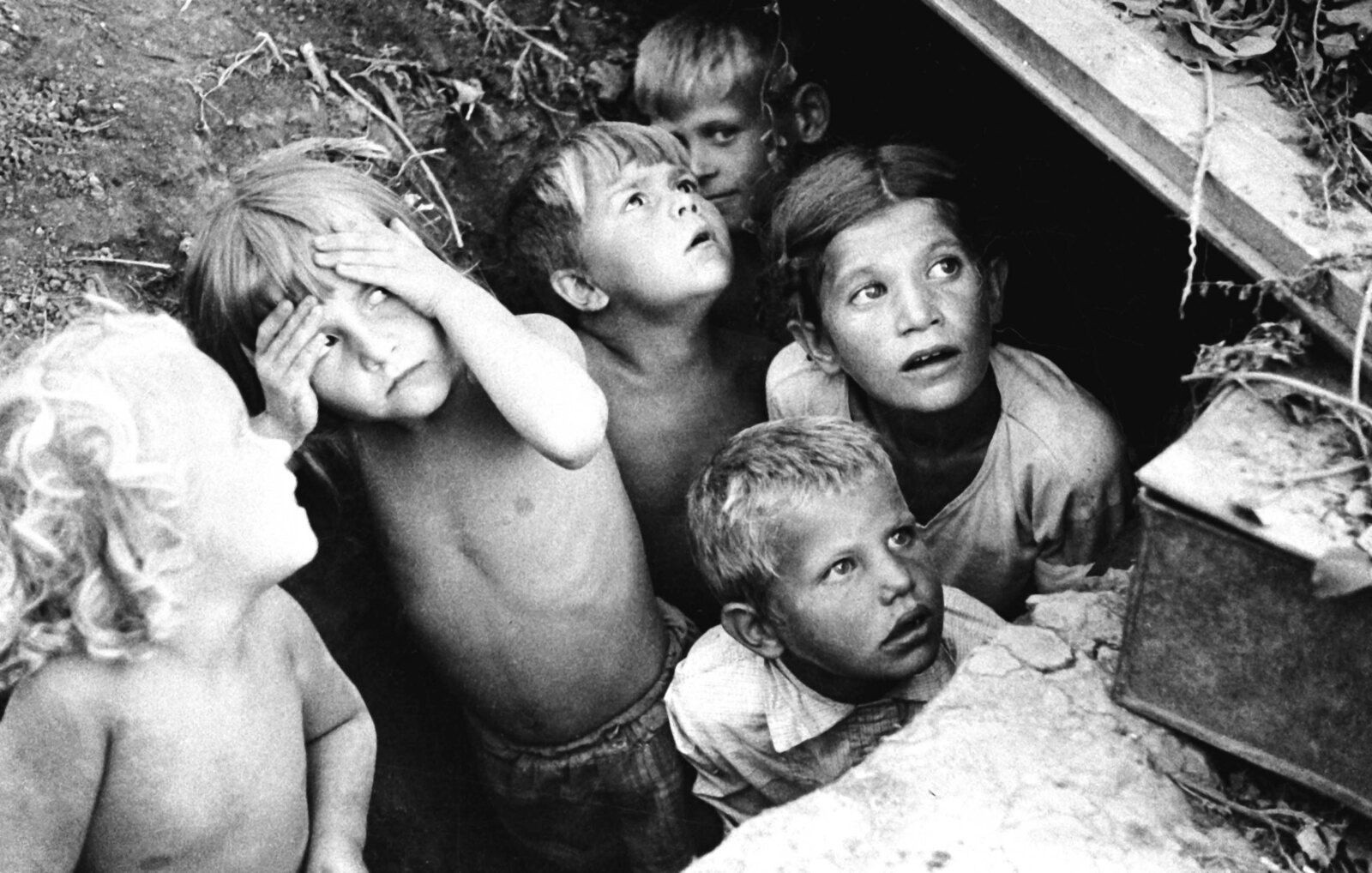
Soviet children during a German air raid

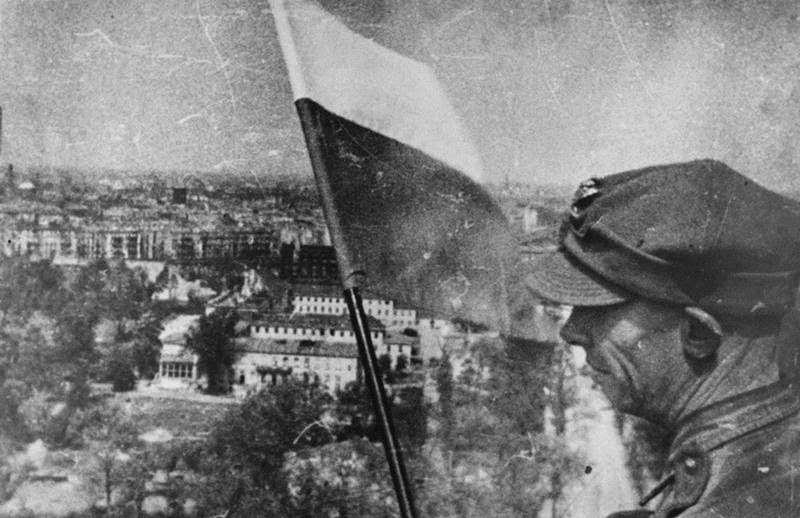
The Polish flag raised on the top of Berlin Victory Column on 2 May 1945

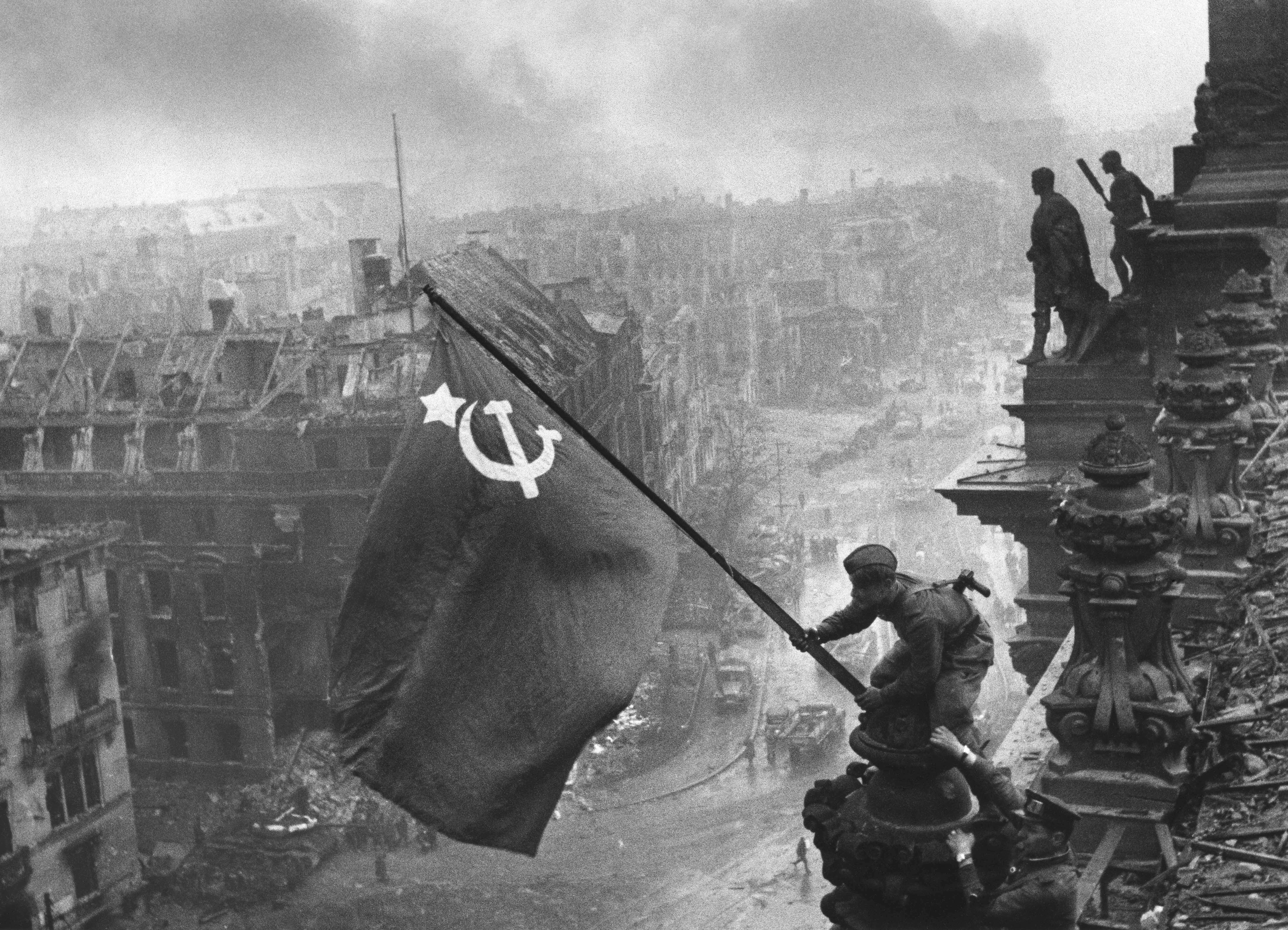
Victorious Soviet troops raise the flag of the Soviet Union over the Reichstag on 2 May 1945.

These works focus on Soviet experiences and operations from the Soviet perspective; see also Bibliography of World War II.

- Beevor, Antony. (1998). Stalingrad: The Fateful Siege: 1942–1943. New York: Penguin Books.
- Bellamy, C. (2007). Absolute War: Soviet Russia in the Second World War. New York: Knopf.
- Erickson, John. (1975). The Road to Stalingrad, Stalin's War with Germany, Volume 1, Weidenfeld & Nicolson, London 1975, 1983
- Erickson, John. (1983).The Road to Berlin. Stalin's War with Germany, Volume 2, Weidenfeld & Nicolson, London 1983
- Exeler, F. (2022). Ghosts of War: Nazi Occupation and Its Aftermath in Soviet Belarus. Ithaca: Cornell University Press.
- Glantz, D. M. (1991). From the Don to the Dnepr: Soviet Offensive Operations. New York: Routledge.
- Glantz, D. M. (2009). After Stalingrad: The Red Army's Winter Offensive, 1942–1943. Warwick: Helion and Company
- Glantz, D. M. (2009). Stalingrad (3 vols.). Lawrence: University Press of Kansas
- Glantz, D. M. (2010/2012/2014). Barbarossa Derailed (3 vols.). Warwick: Helion and Company.
- Glantz, D. M. (2011). Operation Barbarossa: Hitler's Invasion of Russia, 1941. Cheltenham: History Press.
- Glantz, D. M., & House, J. M. (2015). When Titans Clashed: How the Red Army Stopped Hitler. Lawrence: University Press of Kansas.
- Hardesty, V., & Grinberg, I. (2019). Red Phoenix Rising: The Soviet Air Force in World War II. Lawrence: University Press of Kansas.
- Hargreaves, R. (2026). 1942: Hitler's Gamble for Victory. Osprey Publishing.
- Harvey, A. (2018). The Russian Air Force Versus the Luftwaffe: A Western European View. Air Power History, 65(1), 23–30.
- Overy, R. (1997). Russia's War: A History of the Soviet Effort: 1941–1945. New York: Penguin Books.
- Snyder, T. (2010). Bloodlands: Europe Between Hitler and Stalin. New York: Basic Books.

== The Soviet homefront during World War II ==
- Barber, J., & Harrison, M. (1991). The Soviet Home Front, 1941-1945: A Social and Economic History of the USSR in World War II. London: Longman.
- Bidlack, R. (2000). The Political Mood in Leningrad during the First Year of the Soviet-German War. The Russian Review, 59(1), 96–113.
- Braithwaite, R. (2010). Moscow 1941: A City and Its People at War. London: Profile Books.
- Collingham, E. M. (2013). The Taste of War: World War II and the Battle for Food. New York: Penguin Books.
- Garrard, J., & Garrard, C. (1993). World War 2 and the Soviet People. New York: Macmillan.
- Goldman, W. Z., & Filtzer, D. (2021). Fortress Dark and Stern: The Soviet Home Front during World War II. New York: Oxford University Press.
- Jekelʹčyk, S. O. (2014). Stalin's Citizens: Everyday Politics in the Wake of Total War. Oxford: Oxford University Press.
- Kragh, M. (2011). Soviet Labour Law during the Second World War. War in History, 18(4), 531–546.
- Manley, R. (2012). To the Tashkent Station: Evacuation and Survival in the Soviet Union at War. Ithaca: Cornell University Press.
- Reid, A. (2012). Leningrad: The Epic Siege of World War II, 1941–1944. New York: Walker & Company.
- Stites, R. (1995). Culture and Entertainment in Wartime Russia. Bloomington: Indiana University Press.
- Thurston, R. W., & Bonwetsch, B. (2000). The People's War: Responses to World War II in the Soviet Union. Urbana: University of Illinois Press.
- Weiner, A. (1996). The Making of a Dominant Myth: The Second World War and the Construction of Political Identities within the Soviet Polity. The Russian Review, 55(4), 638–660.
- Yekelchyk, S. (2014). Stalin’s Citizens: Everyday Politics in the Wake of Total War. Oxford: Oxford University Press.

== The Allies and the Soviet Union in World War II ==
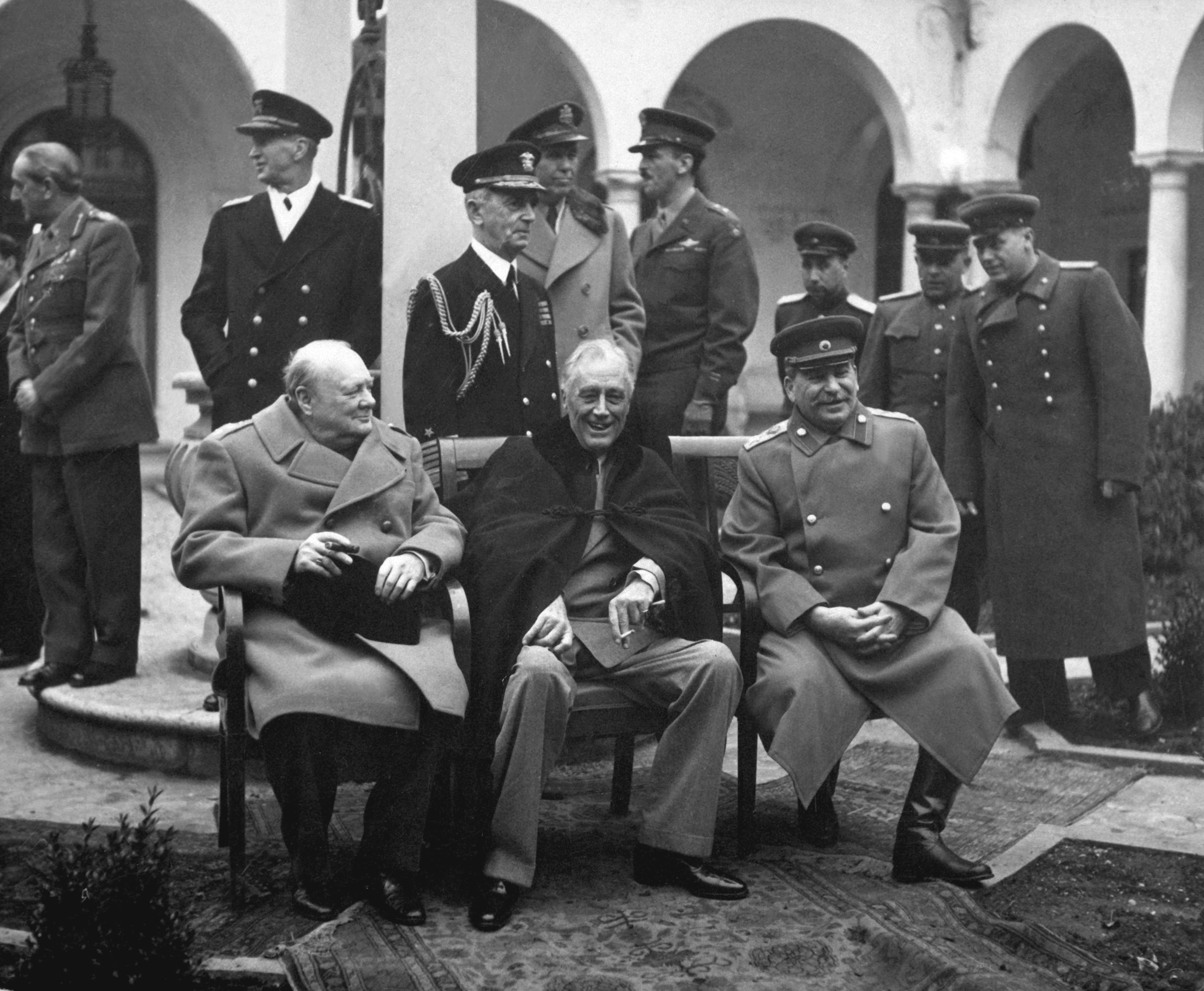
Big Three in Yalta Winston Churchill, Franklin D. Roosevelt and Joseph Stalin.

- Butler, S. (2016). Roosevelt and Stalin: Portrait of a Partnership. New York: Vintage Books.
- Fischer, G. (1950). Genesis of U. S.-Soviet Relations in World War II. The Review of Politics, 12(3), 363–378.
- Haas, M. L. (2022). An Unrealized Frenemy Alliance: Britain's and France's Failure to Ally with the Soviet Union, 1933–39. In Frenemies: When Ideological Enemies Ally (pp. 69–121). Cornell University Press.
- Havlat, D. (2017). Western Aid for the Soviet Union During World War II: Part I. The Journal of Slavic Military Studies, 30(2), 290–320.
- Havlat, D. (2017). Western Aid for the Soviet Union During World War II: Part II. The Journal of Slavic Military Studies, 30(4), 561–601.
- Herring, G. (1969). Lend-Lease to Russia and the Origins of the Cold War, 1944-1945. The Journal of American History, 56(1), 93–114.
- Hett, B. C. (2020). The Nazi Menace: Hitler, Churchill, Roosevelt, Stalin, and the Road to War. New York: Henry Holt and Company.
- Hill, A. (2007). British Lend-Lease Aid and the Soviet War Effort, June 1941–June 1942. The Journal of Military History 71(3), 773–808.
- Kelly, J. (2020). Saving Stalin: Roosevelt, Churchill, Stalin, and the Cost of Allied Victory. Hachette: Hachette Books.
- Kettenacker, L. (1982). The Anglo-Soviet Alliance and the Problem of Germany, 1941-1945. Journal of Contemporary History, 17(3), 435–458.
- Mayers, D. (2011). The Great Patriotic War, FDR's Embassy Moscow, and Soviet—US Relations. The International History Review, 33(2), 299–333.
- Munting, R. (1984). Lend-Lease and the Soviet War Effort. Journal of Contemporary History, 19(3), 495–510.
- Munting, R. (1984). Soviet Food Supply and Allied Aid in the War, 1941-45. Soviet Studies, 36(4), 582–593.
- Neiberg, M. S. (2015). Potsdam: The End of World War II and the Remaking of Europe. New York: Basic Books.
- Plokhy, S. M. (2014). Yalta: The Price of Peace. New York: Penguin Books.
- Preston, D. (2020). Eight Days at Yalta: How Churchill, Roosevelt and Stalin Shaped the Post-War World. New York: Atlantic Monthly Press.
- Reynolds, D., & Pechatnov, V. (2019). The Kremlin Letters: Stalin's Wartime Correspondence with Churchill and Roosevelt. New Haven: Yale University Press.
- Watson, D. (2000). Molotov's Apprenticeship in Foreign Policy: The Triple Alliance Negotiations in 1939. Europe-Asia Studies, 52(4), 695–722.
- Watson, D. (2002). Molotov, The Making of the Grand Alliance and the Second Front 1939-1942. Europe-Asia Studies, 54(1), 51–85.

== Genocide, ethnic cleansing, and war crimes ==
This section contains works relating to war crimes and acts of genocide committed by or against the Soviets and events of the Holocaust committed on Soviet territory.

- Arad, Y. (2013). The Holocaust in the Soviet Union. Lincoln, NE: University of Nebraska Press.
- Beevor, A. (2014). The Fall of Berlin 1945. New York: Penguin Books.
- Beorn, W. W. (2014). Marching into Darkness: The Wehrmacht and the Holocaust in Belarus. Cambridge, MA: Harvard University Press.
- Cassedy, E. (2012). We Are Here: Memories of the Lithuanian Holocaust. Lincoln, NE: University of Nebraska Press.
- Cienciala, A. M. (2001). Poles and Jews under German and Soviet Occupation, September 1, 1939 - June 22 1941. The Polish Review, 46(4), 391–402.
- Gerhard, G. (2017). Nazi Hunger Politics: A History of Food in the Third Reich. Lanham, MD: Rowman & Littlefield.
- Kay, A. J., Rutherford, J., & Stahel, D. (2014). Nazi Policy on the Eastern Front, 1941: Total War, Genocide, and Radicalization. Rochester: University of Rochester Press.
- Kershaw, I. (2014). The End: The Defiance and Destruction of Hitler's Germany, 1944-1945. New York: Penguin Books.
- Koerber, J. (2020). Borderland Generation: Soviet and Polish Jews under Hitler'. Syracuse: Syracuse University Press.
- Lower, W. (2007). Nazi Empire-building and the Holocaust in Ukraine. Chapel Hill: University of North Carolina Press.
- McBride, J. (2016). Peasants into Perpetrators: The OUN-UPA and the Ethnic Cleansing of Volhynia, 1943–1944. Slavic Review, 75(3), 630–654.
- Pohl, D. (2003). Russians, Ukrainians, and German Occupation Policy, 1941–43. in Kappeler, A., Kohut, Z. E., Sysyn, F. E., & von Hagen, M. (Eds.). Culture, nation, and identity: the Ukrainian-Russian encounter, 1600–1945 (pp. 277–297). Toronto: Canadian Institute of Ukrainian Studies Press.
- Sanford, G. (2006). The Katyn Massacre and Polish-Soviet Relations, 1941-43. Journal of Contemporary History, 41(1), 95–111.
- Statiev, A. (2013). The Soviet Counterinsurgency in the Western Borderlands. Cambridge: Cambridge University Press.
- Steinhart, E. C. (2018). The Holocaust and Germanization of Ukraine. Cambridge: Cambridge University Press.
- Tuszynski, M., & Denda, D. F. (1999). Soviet War Crimes Against Poland During The Second World War And Its Aftermath: A Review Of The Factual Record And Outstanding Questions. The Polish Review, 44(2), 183–216.
- Wheatcroft, S. G. (1996). The Scale and Nature of German and Soviet Repression and Mass Killings, 1930-45. Europe-Asia Studies, 48(8), 1319–1353.

=== Holocaust in the Soviet Union ===
For works on the Holocaust in Ukraine, please see Bibliography of the Holocaust in Ukraine.

- Cassedy, E. (2012). We Are Here: Memories of the Lithuanian Holocaust (Illustrated ed.). University of Nebraska Press.
- Gordon, H. (2000). The Shadow of Death: The Holocaust in Lithuania, University Press of Kentucky.
- Issrof, S. (2002). The Holocaust in Lithuania, 1941-1945: A Book of Remembrance (3 vols.). (R. L. Cohen, Ed.). Gefen Books.
- Levin, D. (1993). Lithuanian Attitudes toward the Jewish Minority in the Aftermath of the Holocaust: The Lithuanian Press, 1991–1992, Holocaust and Genocide Studies, 7(2), 247–262.
- Levin, D. (1990). On the Relations between the Baltic Peoples and their Jewish Neighbors before, during and after World War II, Holocaust and Genocide Studies, 5(1), 53–56.
- Sepetys, R. (2011). Between Shades of Gray (Illustrated edition). Philomel Books.
- Stasiulis, S. (2020). The Holocaust in Lithuania: The Key Characteristics of Its History, and the Key Issues in Historiography and Cultural Memory. East European Politics and Societies, 34(1), 261–279.
- Vanagaite, Ruta, Zuroff, Efraim. (2020). Our People: Discovering Lithuania's Hidden Holocaust. Rowman & Littlefield.

== Topical ==
Works included here are specifically about the civilian and military aspects of the war years. For a broader scope, please see Bibliography of Stalinism and the Soviet Union.

- Under Construction

=== Foreign Policy and external relations ===
- Sword, K. (1991). British Reactions to the Soviet Occupation of Eastern Poland in September 1939. The Slavonic and East European Review, 69(1), 81–101.
- Watson, D. (2002). Molotov, the Making of the Grand Alliance and the Second Front 1939-1942. Europe-Asia Studies, 54(1), 51–85.

=== Gender and family ===
- Giedroyć, M., (N. Davies, preface). (2010). Crater’s Edge: A Family’s Epic Journey Through Wartime Russia. London: Bene Factum Publishing.
- Jolluck, K. R. (2002). Exile and Identity: Polish Women in the Soviet Union During World War II. Pittsburgh: Pittsburgh University Press.
- Simmons, C. (1998). Lifting the Siege: Women’s Voices on Leningrad (1941-1944). Canadian Slavonic Papers / Revue Canadienne Des Slavistes, 40(1/2), 43–65.

=== Military life ===
- Reese, R. R. (1996). Stalin’s Reluctant Soldiers: A Social History of the Red Army, 1925-1941. Lawrence: University Press of Kansas.

=== Propaganda ===
- Stanley Bill. (2018). Propaganda on the Margins: Bruno Schulz’s Soviet Illustrations, 1940–41. The Slavonic and East European Review, 96(3), 432–468.
- Thompson, E. M. (1991). Nationalist Propaganda in the Soviet Russian Press, 1939-1941. Slavic Review, 50(2), 385–399.

=== Religion ===
- Eden, J. (2021). God Save the USSR: Soviet Muslims and the Second World War. Oxford: Oxford University Press.
- Motadel, D. (2013). Islam and Germany's War in the Soviet Borderlands, 1941–5. Journal of Contemporary History, 48(4), 784–820.
- Murav, H., & Estraikh, G. (Eds.). (2014). Soviet Jews in World War II: Fighting, Witnessing, Remembering. Boston: Academic Studies Press.
- Pinchuk, B. C. (1978). The Sovietization of the Jewish Community of Eastern Poland 1939-1941. Slavonic and East European Review, 56(3), 387–410.

=== Rural studies and agriculture ===
- Marples, D. R. (1985). Western Ukraine and Western Belorussia under Soviet Occupation: The Development of Socialist Farming, 1939-1941. Canadian Slavonic Papers / Revue Canadienne Des Slavistes, 27(2), 158–177.
- McBride, J. (2016). Peasants into Perpetrators: The OUN-UPA and the Ethnic Cleansing of Volhynia, 1943–1944. Slavic Review, 75(3), 630–654.

=== Urban studies, industry and labor ===
- Barnes, S. A. (2000). All for the Front, All for Victory! The Mobilization of Forced Labor in the Soviet Union during World War Two. International Labor and Working-Class History, 58, 239–260.
- Barskova, P. (2017). Besieged Leningrad: Aesthetic Responses to Urban Disaster. DeKalb: Northern Illinois University Press.
- Braithwaite, R. (2006). Moscow 1941: A City and Its People at War. New York: Knopf.
- Cohen, L. R. (2013). Smolensk under the Nazis: Everyday Life in Occupied Russia. Woodbridge: Boydell & Brewer.
- Piankevich, V. L., & Burkum, E. (2016). The Family under Siege: Leningrad, 1941-44. The Russian Review, 75(1), 107–137.
- Reid, A. (2011). Leningrad: Tragedy of a City Under Siege, 1941-44. New York: Bloomsbury.
- White, E. (2007). After the War Was over: The Civilian Return to Leningrad. Europe-Asia Studies, 59(7), 1145–1161.

== Other studies ==
- Andreyev, C. (2009). Vlasov and the Russian Liberation Movement: Soviet Reality and Emigre Theories (Cambridge Russian, Soviet and Post-Soviet Studies). Cambridge: Cambridge University Press.
- Armstrong, J. L. (1990). Policy Toward the Polish Minority in the Soviet Union, 1923–1989. The Polish Review, 35(1), 51–65.
- Barany, G. (1983). Jewish Prisoners of War in the Soviet Union during World War II. Jahrbücher Für Geschichte Osteuropa's, 31(2), 161–209.
- Burds, J. (2007). The Soviet War against 'Fifth Columnists': The Case of Chechnya, 1942-4. Journal of Contemporary History, 42(2), 267–314.
- Ciechanowski, J. (2010). The Warsaw Rising of 1944 (Cambridge Russian, Soviet and Post-Soviet Studies). Cambridge: Cambridge University Press.
- Cienciala, A. M. (1985). The Activities of Polish Communists as a Source for Stalin’s Policy Towards Poland in the Second World War. The International History Review, 7(1), 129–145.
- Eimeleus, K. B. E. E., & Allen, E. J. B. (2019). Skis in the Art of War (Illustrated edition; W. D. Frank, Trans.). DeKalb: Northern Illinois University Press.
- Hartley, J. M. (2021). Chapter 15:The Volga and the Second World War: Conflict, reconstruction, and identity. In The Volga: A History. New Haven: Yale University Press.
- Hasegawa, T. (2011). Soviet Policy Toward Japan During World War II. Cahiers Du Monde Russe, 52(2/3), 245–271.
- Herman, J. (1980). Soviet Peace Efforts On the Eve of World War Two: A Review of the Soviet Documents. Journal of Contemporary History, 15(3), 577–602.
- Kiebuzinski, K., & Motyl, A. (Eds.). (2017). The Great West Ukrainian Prison Massacre of 1941: A Sourcebook. Amsterdam: Amsterdam University Press.
- Kondoyanidi, A. (2010). The Liberating Experience: War Correspondents, Red Army Soldiers, and the Nazi Extermination Camps. The Russian Review, 69(3), 438–462.
- Krylova, A. (2014). Soviet Modernity: Stephen Kotkin and the Bolshevik Predicament. Contemporary European History, 23(2), 167–192.
- Lee, E. (2020). Night of the Bayonets: The Texel Uprising and Hitler's Revenge, April–May 1945. Barnsley: Greenhill Books.
- Mark, J. (2005). Remembering Rape: Divided Social Memory and the Red Army in Hungary 1944-1945. Past & Present, (188), 133–161.
- Pinchuk, B.-C. (1986). Cultural Sovietization in a Multi-Ethnic Environment: Jewish Culture in Soviet Poland, 1939-1941. Jewish Social Studies, 48(2), 163–174.
- Qualls, K. D. (2020). Stalin's Niños: Educating Spanish Civil War Refugee Children in the Soviet Union, 1937–1951. Toronto: University of Toronto Press, 2020.
- Reese, R. R. (2007) Motivations to Serve: The Soviet Soldier in the Second World War. The Journal of Slavic Military Studies, 20(2), 263–282.
- Raack, R. C. (1990). Stalin Fixes the Oder-Neisse Line. Journal of Contemporary History, 25(4), 467–488.
- Raack, R. C. (1991). Stalin's Plans for World War II. Journal of Contemporary History, 26(2), 215–227.
- Raack, R. C. (1993). Stalin Plans His Post-War Germany. Journal of Contemporary History, 28(1), 53–73.
- Reynolds, D. (2002). From World War to Cold War: The Wartime Alliance and Post-War Transitions, 1941-1947. The Historical Journal, 45(1), 211–227.
- Roberts, G. (2006). Stalin's Wars: From World War to Cold War, 1939-1953. Yale University Press.
- Zubok, V. (1997). Stalin's Plans and Russian Archives. Diplomatic History, 21(2), 295–305.

== Historiography ==
- Cienciala, A. M. (1999). Detective Work: Researching Soviet World War II Policy on Poland in Russian Archives (Moscow, 1994). Cahiers Du Monde Russe, 40(1/2), 251–269.
- Jażborowska, I. (2008). Russian Historical Writing About The Crime Of Katyn. The Polish Review, 53(2), 139–157.
- Sandomirskaia, I. (2010). A Politeia in Besiegement: Lidiia Ginzburg on the Siege of Leningrad as a Political Paradigm. Slavic Review, 69(2), 306–326.

=== Memory studies ===
- Clapperton, J. (2007). The Siege of Leningrad as Sacred Narrative: Conversations with Survivors. Oral History, 35(1), 49–60.
- Barskova, P. (2010). The Spectacle of the Besieged City: Repurposing Cultural Memory in Leningrad, 1941–1944. Slavic Review, 69(2), 327–355.
- Hicks, J. (2020). The Victory Banner over the Reichstag: Film, Document, and Ritual in Russia's Contested Memory of World War II (Russian and East European Studies). Pittsburgh: University of Pittsburgh Press.
- Jilge, W., & Troebst, S. (2006). Divided Historical Cultures? World War II and Historical Memory in Soviet and post-Soviet Ukraine: Introduction. Jahrbücher Für Geschichte Osteuropas, 54(1), 1–2.
- Kudryashov, S. (2013). Remembering and Researching the War: The Soviet and Russian Experience. In J. Echternkamp & S. Martens (Eds.), Experience and Memory: The Second World War in Europe. New York: Berghahn Books.

== Historical fiction ==
A select list of notable historical fiction related to the Soviet Union during World War II. (Note: Entries either have articles or are referenced with reliable secondary sources.)

== Primary sources ==
A select list of notable primary sources related to the Soviet Union during World War II.

- Peri, A. (2017). The War Within: Diaries from the Siege of Leningrad. Cambridge: Harvard University Press.

=== Filmography ===
A select list of notable films related to the Soviet Union during World War II.

- Under construction

== See also ==
- Bibliography of Stalinism and the Soviet Union
- Bibliography of World War II
- Bibliography of the Holocaust
- Bibliography of Ukrainian history
- Bibliography of the history of Belarus and Byelorussia
- Bibliography of the history of Poland
