= Bibliography of the Asharshylyk =

Bibliography of academic books and journal articles on the Kazakh famine (Asharshylyk)

Asharshylyq Ашаршылық
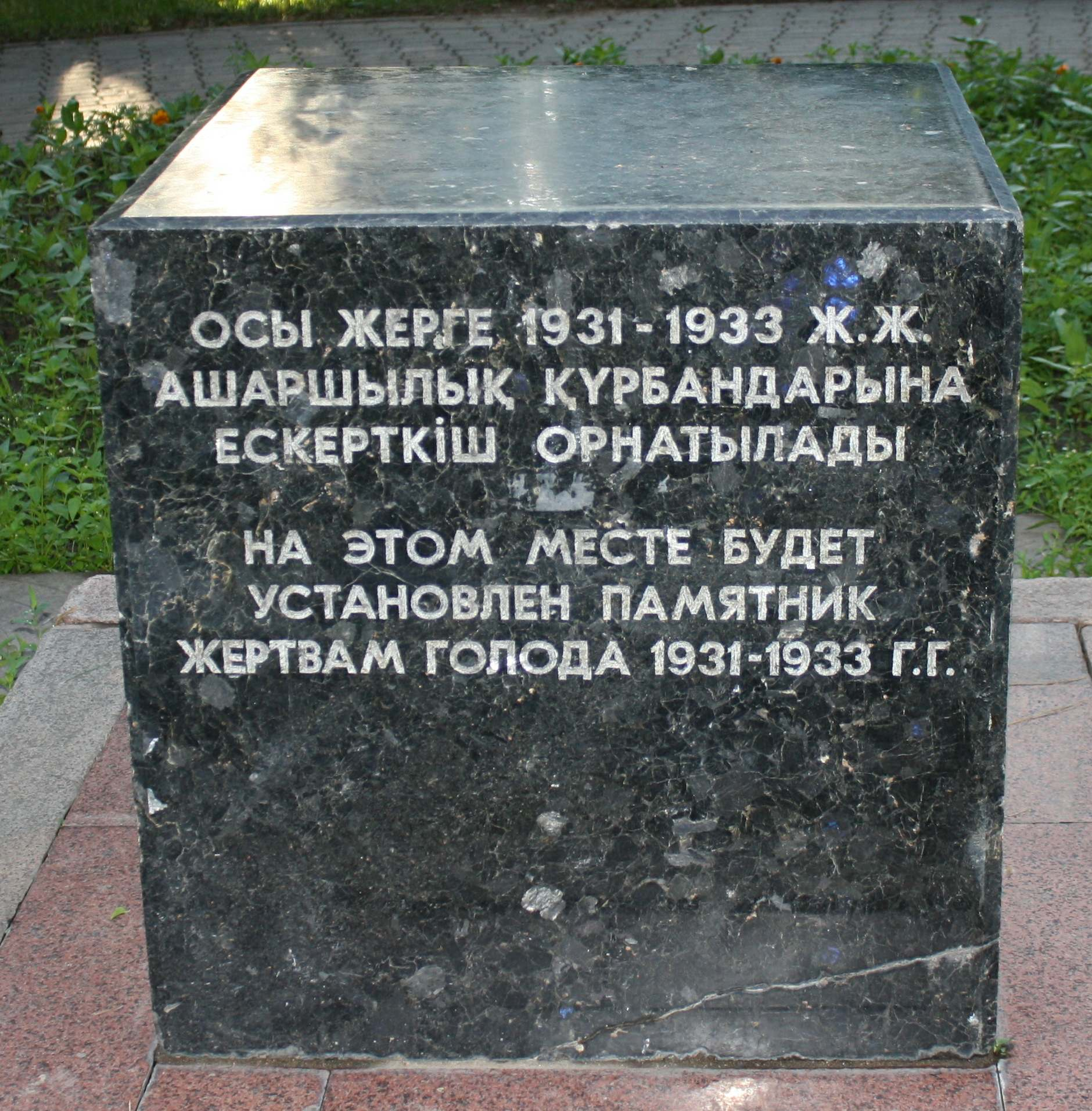
- The cube at the site for the future monument for victims of the famine (dated 1931–1933) in the center of Almaty, Kazakhstan. The monument itself was built in 2017.
- Country: Soviet Union
- Location: Kazakhstan, Russian SFSR
- Period: 1930–1933
- Total deaths: 1.5–2.3 million
- Refugees: 665,000 to 1.1 million
- Causes: Forced collectivization under Filipp Goloshchyokin
- Effect on demographics: 38–42% of the entire Kazakh population died
- Consequences: Kazakhs reduced from 60% to 38% of the republic's population; sedentarization of the nomadic Kazakh people
- Preceded by: Kazakh famine of 1919–1922

This is a select bibliography of English language academic level books and journal articles, published mainly after World War II, (Note: Works published during or before World War II should be limited to areas where there are no significant post-World War II books on the subject or when the work in question has significant historical merit.) about the history of the Kazakh famine (Asharshylyk) and its historical context. (Note: For information about the famine during the Russian Civil War, see Kazakh famine of 1919–1922.)

The Kazakh famine of 1930–1933, also known as the Asharshylyq, (Note: Kazakh: Ашаршылық, Aşarşylyq [ɑʃɑrʃəˈɫəq]; meaning 'famine' or 'hunger'.) was a famine in the Kazakh Autonomous Socialist Soviet Republic, then part of the Soviet Union, during which an estimated 1.3 to 2.3 million people died, the majority of them ethnic Kazakhs. Between 38 and 42 percent of all Kazakhs perished, the highest proportion of any ethnic group killed in the Soviet famines of the early 1930s.

Works listed here are cited in the notes or bibliographies of scholarly sources. Each is published by an academic or major press, written by a recognized expert, or substantially reviewed in scholarly journals; borderline cases are omitted. A selection of primary sources are included. Many of the books below carry their own bibliographies; see the Further reading section for other bibliographies, and the External links section for historical sites, academic sites, and museums.

Citations follow APA style. (Note: Entries are in plain text APA 7 format without templates; templates are used only for reviews and notes.) Book have citations to academic journal or mainstream published reviews when available. For books only partly about the subject, relevant chapter or section titles are provided when useful and available. Translators of the original-language edition are included when possible. In cases where a title or name has appeared with more than one English spelling, the most recent published form is used and a footnote documents any earlier title under which the work appeared.

== Bibliography ==
- Abylkhozhin, Z., Akulov, M., & Tsay, A. (Eds.). (2021). Stalinism in Kazakhstan: History, memory, and representation (S. Pawley & A. Platonov, Trans.). Lexington Books.
- Abylkhozhin, Zh. B., Kozybaev, M. K., & Tatimov, M. B. (1989). Kazakhstanskaia tragediia [The Kazakhstan tragedy]. Voprosy istorii, (7), 53–70.
- Applebaum, A. (2017). Red famine: Stalin's war on Ukraine. Doubleday.
- Breyfogle, N. B. (Ed.). (2018). Eurasian environments: Nature and ecology in imperial Russian and Soviet history. University of Pittsburgh Press.
- Cameron, S. (2016). The Kazakh famine of 1930–33: Current research and new directions. East/West: Journal of Ukrainian Studies, 3(2), 117–132.
- Cameron, S. (2018). The hungry steppe: Famine, violence, and the making of Soviet Kazakhstan. Cornell University Press. JSTOR 10.7591/j.ctt21h4vb7
- Cameron, S. (2021). Reckoning with a Stalinist crime. Journal of Genocide Research, 23(4), 611–619.
- Cameron, S. (2023). The famine in Soviet Kazakhstan. In B. Kiernan, W. Lower, N. Naimark, & S. Straus (Eds.), The Cambridge world history of genocide: Vol. 3. Genocide in the contemporary era, 1914–2020 (pp. 186–208). Cambridge University Press. doi:10.1017/9781108767118.009
- Cașu, I. (2021). The benefits of comparison: Famine in Kazakhstan in the early 1930s in Soviet context. Journal of Genocide Research, 23(4), 606–610.
- Conquest, R. (1986). The harvest of sorrow: Soviet collectivization and the terror-famine. Oxford University Press.
- Daly, J. (2017). Hammer, sickle, and soil: The Soviet drive to collectivize agriculture. Hoover Institution Press.
- Davies, R. W., & Wheatcroft, S. G. (2004). The years of hunger: Soviet agriculture, 1931–1933. Palgrave Macmillan.
- Dawisha, K., & Parrott, B. (Eds.). (1997). Conflict, cleavage, and change in Central Asia and the Caucasus. Cambridge University Press.
- Dudoignon, S. A. (Ed.). (2021). Central Eurasian reader: A biennial journal of critical bibliography and epistemology of Central Eurasian studies (Vol. 2). Klaus Schwarz Verlag. doi:10.1515/9783112400395
- Dukeyev, B., Kasymov, S., & Sarsembina, K. (2025). Oral memories: Inter-generational remembrance of the 1931–1933 Kazakh famine. Globalizations, 22(6), 1086–1103.
- Ellman, M. (2007). Stalin and the Soviet famine of 1932–33 revisited. Europe-Asia Studies, 59(4), 663–693.
- Everett-Heath, T. (Ed.). (2003). Central Asia: Aspects of transition. RoutledgeCurzon.
- Faller, H. M. (2011). Nation, language, Islam: Tatarstan's sovereignty movement. Central European University Press.
- Getty, J. A., & Manning, R. T. (Eds.). (1993). Stalinist terror: New perspectives. Cambridge University Press.
- Graziosi, A., & Sysyn, F. E. (Eds.). (2016). Communism and hunger: The Ukrainian, Chinese, Kazakh, and Soviet famines in comparative perspective. Canadian Institute of Ukrainian Studies Press.
- Hancock-Parmer, M. (2015). The Soviet study of the Barefooted Flight of the Kazakhs. Central Asian Survey, 34(3), 281–295.
- Hancock-Parmer, M. (2019). Flight and famine: Interrogating collectivization, Stalinism, and genocide. Kritika: Explorations in Russian and Eurasian History, 20(3), 601–612.
- Kaşıkçı, M. V. (2022). Living under Stalin's rule in Kazakhstan. Kritika: Explorations in Russian and Eurasian History, 23(4), 905–923.
- Kaşıkçı, M. V. (2023). Making sense of catastrophe: Experiencing and remembering the Kazakh famine in a comparative context. Journal of Contemporary History, 58(2), 223–246.
- Kaşıkçı, M. V. (2026). Gendering starvation: Women's experiences of the Kazakh famine, 1930–1933. Gender & History, 38(1), 240–258.
- Keller, S. (2021). The Kazakh famine as a product of Soviet nation-building. Journal of Genocide Research, 23(4), 603–605.
- Kindler, R. (2011). Die Starken und die Schwachen: Zur Bedeutung physischer Gewalt während der Hungersnot in Kasachstan (1930–1934) [The strong and the weak: On the significance of physical violence during the famine in Kazakhstan (1930–1934)]. Jahrbücher für Geschichte Osteuropas, 59(1), 51–78.
- Kindler, R. (2012). Opfer ohne Täter: Kasachische und ukrainische Erinnerung an den Hunger 1932/33 [Victims without perpetrators: Kazakh and Ukrainian memories of the hunger of 1932/33]. Osteuropa, 62(3), 105–120.
- Kindler, R. (2014). Famines and political communication in Stalinism: Possibilities and limits of the sayable. Jahrbücher für Geschichte Osteuropas, 62(2), 255–272.
- Kindler, R. (2018). Stalin's nomads: Power and famine in Kazakhstan (C. Klohr, Trans.). University of Pittsburgh Press. JSTOR j.ctv3znxgm (Original work published 2014)
- Kuzovova, N., & Zhanbossinova, A. (2026). The Holodomor in Ukraine and the Asharshylyk in Kazakhstan: A comparative analysis of survival practices. Journal of Eurasian Studies. Advance online publication.
- Laruelle, M. (Ed.). (2016). Kazakhstan in the making: Legitimacy, symbols, and social changes. Lexington Books.
- Levene, M. (2013). The crisis of genocide: Vol. 1. Devastation: The European rimlands, 1912–1938. Oxford University Press.
- Martin, T. (2001). The affirmative action empire: Nations and nationalism in the Soviet Union, 1923–1939. Cornell University Press.
- Naimark, N. M. (2010). Stalin's genocides. Princeton University Press.
- Nefedov, S., & Ellman, M. (2019). The Soviet famine of 1931–1934: Genocide, a result of poor harvests, or the outcome of a conflict between the state and the peasants? Europe-Asia Studies, 71(6), 1048–1065.
- Newton, S. (2014). Law and the making of the Soviet world: The red demiurge. Routledge.
- Nurtazina, N. (2012). Great famine of 1931–1933 in Kazakhstan: A contemporary's reminiscences. Acta Slavica Iaponica, 32, 105–129.
- Olcott, M. B. (1981). The collectivization drive in Kazakhstan. The Russian Review, 40(2), 122–142.
- Olcott, M. B. (1995). The Kazakhs (2nd ed.). Hoover Institution Press.
- Payne, M. J. (2001). The forge of the Kazakh proletariat? The Turksib, nativization, and industrialization during Stalin's first five-year plan. In R. G. Suny & T. Martin (Eds.), A state of nations: Empire and nation-making in the age of Lenin and Stalin (pp. 223–252). Oxford University Press.
- Payne, M. J. (2011). Seeing like a Soviet state: Settlement of nomadic Kazakhs, 1928–1934. In G. Alexopoulos, J. Hessler, & K. Tomoff (Eds.), Writing the Stalin era: Sheila Fitzpatrick and Soviet historiography (pp. 59–86). Palgrave Macmillan.
- Pianciola, N. (2001). The collectivization famine in Kazakhstan, 1931–1933. Harvard Ukrainian Studies, 25(3/4), 237–251.
- Pianciola, N. (2004). Famine in the steppe: The collectivization of agriculture and the Kazak herdsmen, 1928–1934. Cahiers du monde russe, 45(1–2), 137–192.
- Pianciola, N. (2016). Towards a transnational history of great leaps forward in pastoral Central Eurasia. East/West: Journal of Ukrainian Studies, 3(2), 75–116.
- Pianciola, N. (2017). Stalinist spatial hierarchies: Placing the Kazakhs and Kyrgyz in Soviet economic regionalization. Central Asian Survey, 36(1), 73–92.
- Pianciola, N. (2018). Ukraine and Kazakhstan: Comparing the famines. Contemporary European History, 27(3), 440–444.
- Pianciola, N. (2020). The benefits of marginality: The great famine around the Aral Sea, 1930–1934. Nationalities Papers, 48(3), 513–529.
- Pianciola, N. (2021). Environment, empire, and the great famine in Stalin's Kazakhstan. Journal of Genocide Research, 23(4), 588–592.
- Pianciola, N. (2022). Sacrificing the Qazaqs: The Stalinist hierarchy of consumption and the great famine of 1931–33 in Kazakhstan. Journal of Central Asian History, 1(2), 225–272.
- Rasuly-Paleczek, G., & Katschnig, J. (Eds.). (2004). Central Asia on display: Proceedings of the VII. conference of the European Society for Central Asian Studies. LIT Verlag.
- Richter, J. (2020). Famine, memory, and politics in the post-Soviet space: Contrasting echoes of collectivization in Ukraine and Kazakhstan. Nationalities Papers, 48(3), 476–491.
- Sabol, S. (2017). "The touch of civilization": Comparing American and Russian internal colonization. University Press of Colorado. JSTOR j.ctt1mtz7g6
- Sahni, K. (1997). Crucifying the Orient: Russian orientalism and the colonization of Caucasus and Central Asia. White Orchid Press.
- Shoshanova, S. (2024). The Asharshylyq in contemporary and public art of Kazakhstan: The politics of commemorating the Kazakh famine of the 1930s. History & Memory, 36(1), 45–82.
- Snyder, T. (2010). Bloodlands: Europe between Hitler and Stalin. Basic Books.
- Thomas, A. (2018). Nomads and Soviet rule: Central Asia under Lenin and Stalin. I.B. Tauris.
- Vanderkolk, G. (2023). In the shadow of famine: How do Russo–Ukrainian and Russo–Kazakh relations impact memorialisation of the Holodomor and Kazakh famine? Australian and New Zealand Journal of European Studies, 15(3), 29–42.
- Vladimirsky, I. (2021). The deadly price of the socialist construction in a peasant country: The case of Kazakhstan. Journal of Genocide Research, 23(4), 598–602.
- Weiss-Wendt, A. (2017). The Soviet Union and the gutting of the UN Genocide Convention. University of Wisconsin Press.
- Werth, N. (1999). A state against its people: Violence, repression, and terror in the Soviet Union. In S. Courtois, N. Werth, J.-L. Panné, A. Paczkowski, K. Bartošek, & J.-L. Margolin, The black book of communism: Crimes, terror, repression (J. Murphy & M. Kramer, Trans.; pp. 33–268). Harvard University Press.
- Wheatcroft, S. G. (2017). Eastern Europe (Russia and the USSR). In G. Alfani & C. Ó Gráda (Eds.), Famine in European history (pp. 212–239). Cambridge University Press. doi:10.1017/9781316841235.010
- Wheatcroft, S. G. (2021). The complexity of the Kazakh famine: Food problems and faulty perceptions. Journal of Genocide Research, 23(4), 593–597.
- Wolowyna, O. (2021). A demographic framework for the 1932–1934 famine in the Soviet Union. Journal of Genocide Research, 23(4), 501–526.

== See also ==
- Bibliography of Stalinism and the Soviet Union
- Bibliography of genocide studies
- Bibliography of the Holodomor
- Soviet famine of 1930–1933
