= Serhii Plokhy =

Ukrainian-American historian (born 1957)

- Сергій Плохій
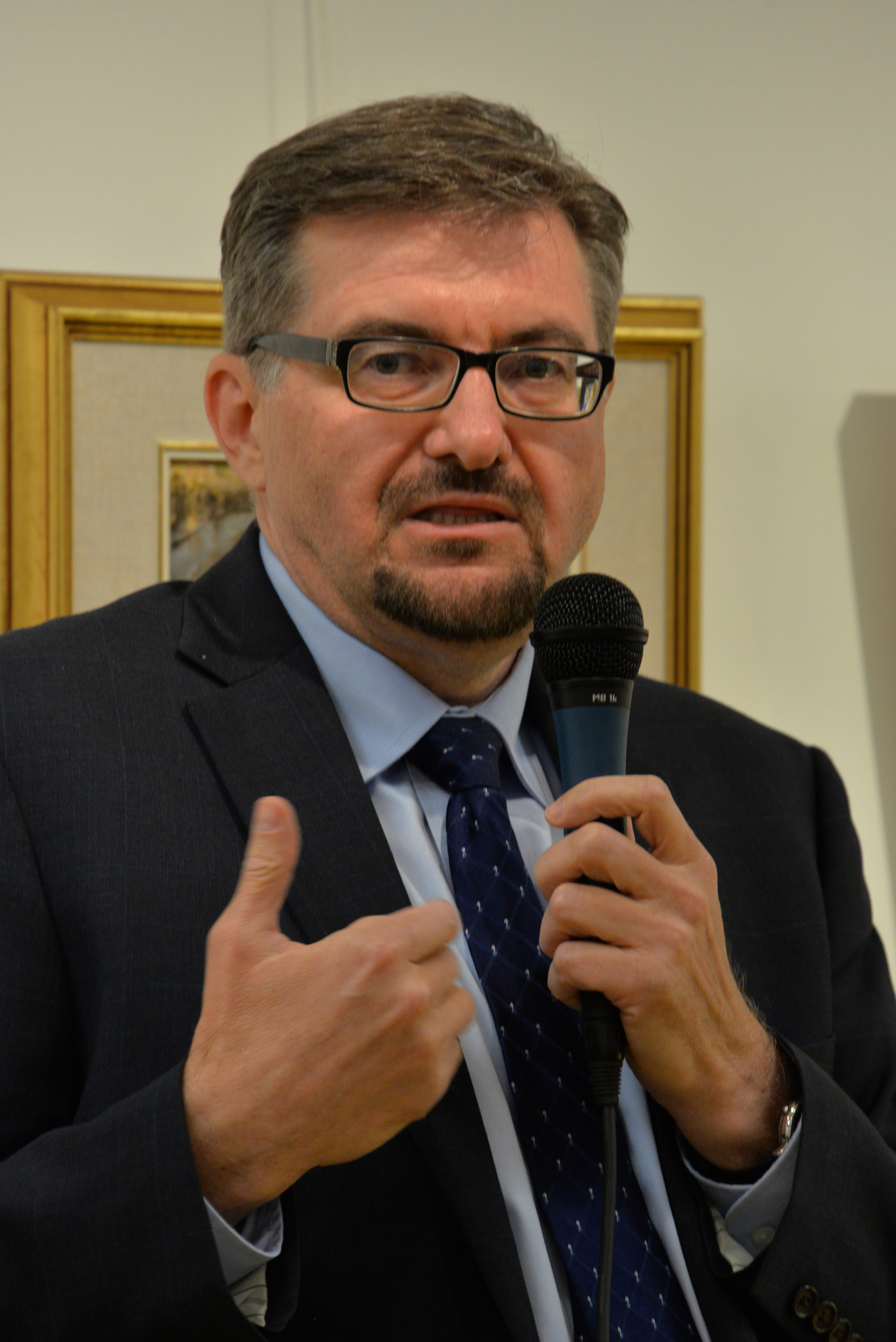
- Born: 23 May 1957 (age 69); Gorky, Russian SFSR, Soviet Union

Academic work
- Discipline: Historian
- Institutions: Harvard University
- Main interests: History of Ukraine; Cold War

Serhii Mykolayovych Plokhy (Note: Also spelled Plokhii) (Ukrainian: Сергій Миколайович Плохій; born 23 May 1957) is a historian and author. He is the Mykhailo Hrushevsky professor (Note: Mykhailo Hrushevsky (1866–1934), the founder of modern Ukrainian historiography, is the scholar for whom the chair of Ukrainian history at Harvard University is named.) of Ukrainian history at Harvard University, where between 2013 and 2025 he also served as the director of the Harvard Ukrainian Research Institute.

== Early life and education ==
Serhii Plokhy was born in Nizhny Novgorod (then called Gorkiy), RSFSR, to Ukrainian parents. He spent his childhood and school years in Zaporizhzhia, Ukraine, where his family returned soon after his birth.

Plokhy received his undergraduate degree in history and social sciences from the University of Dnipropetrovsk (1980), where he studied under professors Mykola Kovalskyi and Yuriy Mytsyk, and his graduate degree from the Russian University of the Friendship of Peoples (1982), specializing in historiography and source studies. He received his habilitation degree in history from Taras Shevchenko National University of Kyiv in 1990.

== Academic career ==
Between 1983 and 1991, Plokhy taught at the University of Dnipropetrovsk, where he was promoted to the rank of full professor and held a number of administrative positions during perestroika. In 1996, after a number of visiting appointments as the Ramsey Tompkins Professor of Russian history at the University of Alberta, Plokhy joined the staff of the university's Canadian Institute of Ukrainian Studies, where he founded the Research Program on Religion and Culture. As part of the Peter Jacyk Center for Ukrainian Historical Research, he participated in the publication of the English-language translation of Mykhailo Hrushevsky's History of Ukraine-Rus'.

In 2007, Plokhy was named the Mykhailo Hrushevsky professor of Ukrainian history at Harvard. Since 2013, he has served as the director of the Harvard Ukrainian Research Institute, where he leads a group of scholars working on MAPA: The Digital Atlas of Ukraine, an online, GIS-based project.

=== Research and publications ===
Plokhy's research and writing deal with the intellectual, cultural, and international history of Eastern Europe, with special emphasis on Ukraine. His first monograph, The Papacy and Ukraine, was among the few books published in the Soviet Union to deal with the history of the papacy as an academic subject rather than an object of atheistic propaganda. Among Plokhy's best known contributions to the study of early modern history is The Origins of the Slavic Nations, a broad survey of the history of the region which rejects primordialist ideas that postulate the existence of either one or three—Russian, Ukrainian, and Belarusian—East Slavic nationalities before the rise of nationalism. Instead, it proposes an alternative scheme of the development of pre-modern identities of the Eastern Slavs.

Plokhy's research on the history of the Cold War era resulted in the publication of Yalta: The Price of Peace and The Last Empire, where Plokhy challenged the interpretation of the collapse of the Soviet Union as an American victory in the Cold War, instead arguing Ukraine and Russia were the two republics responsible for the end of the Soviet Union.

== Honors and awards ==
Plokhy's books have been translated into a number of languages, including Albanian, Belarusian, Bulgarian, Chinese (classical and simplified), Czech, Estonian, Greek, Finnish, Italian, Korean, Lithuanian, Polish, Portuguese, Romanian, Russian, Spanish, and Ukrainian, and won numerous awards and prizes.

The Last Empire: The Final Days of the Soviet Union won the 2015 Lionel Gelber Prize for the world's best non-fiction book in English on global issues and the 2015 Pushkin House Russian Book Prize. Chernobyl won the 2018 Baillie Gifford Prize (formerly the Samuel Johnson Prize). Much of Plohky's evidence in the book comes from published sources, but "he tells the story with great assurance and style, and the majority of his material appears here for the first time in English," wrote Tobie Mathew in Literary Review.

In 2009, Plokhy received the Early Slavic Studies Association Distinguished Scholarship Award, and in 2013 he was named the Walter Channing Cabot Fellow at the Faculty of Arts and Sciences of Harvard University for scholarly eminence in the field of history. In 2015 Serhii Plokhy received the Antonovych prize, and in 2018 he received the Shevchenko National Prize (Ukraine). In 2024 he was awarded the Arenberg Prize for History for his book The Russo-Ukrainian War.

In 2025 Plokhy received an honorary degree from Oxford University.

In 2026 Plokhy received a Honorary Degree of Doctor of Letters from University of Aberdeen.

== Books ==
- Plokhy, Serhii. The Cossacks and Religion in Early Modern Ukraine, Oxford University Press, 2002. ISBN 978-0-19-924739-4
- Plokhy, Serhii. Tsars and Cossacks: A Study in Iconography, Ukrainian Research Institute, Harvard University, 2003. ISBN 978-0-916458-95-9
- Plokhy, Serhii and Frank E. Sysyn. Religion and Nation in Modern Ukraine, Canadian Institute of Ukrainian Studies, 2003. ISBN 978-1-895571-36-3
- Plokhy, Serhii. Unmaking Imperial Russia: Mykhailo Hrushevsky and the Writing of Ukrainian History, University of Toronto Press, 2005. ISBN 978-0-8020-3937-8
- Plokhy, Serhii. The Origins of the Slavic Nations: Premodern Identities in Russia, Ukraine and Belarus, Cambridge University Press, 2006. ISBN 978-0-521-86403-9
- Plokhy, Serhii. Ukraine and Russia: Representations of the Past , University of Toronto Press, 2008. ISBN 978-0-8020-9327-1
- Plokhy, Serhii. Yalta: The Price of Peace, Viking Adult, 2010. ISBN 0-670-02141-5
- Plokhy, Serhii. The Cossack Myth: History and Nationhood in the Age of Empires, Cambridge University Press, 2012. ISBN 978-1107022102
- Plokhy, Serhii. The Last Empire: The Final Days of the Soviet Union. New York: Basic Books, 2014. 520 pp. $32.00 (cloth), ISBN 978-0-465-05696-5.
- Plokhy, Serhii. The Gates of Europe: A History of Ukraine. New York: Basic Books, 2015. — 395 pp., ISBN 978-0-465-05091-8.
- Plokhy, Serhii. The Man with the Poison Gun: A Cold War Spy Story. New York: Basic Books, 2016. — 384 pp., ISBN 978-0-465-03590-8.
- Plokhy, Serhii. Lost Kingdom: The Quest for Empire and the Making of the Russian Nation. New York: Basic Books, 2017. — 398 pp., ISBN 978-0-465-09849-1.
- Plokhy, Serhii. Chernobyl: History of a Tragedy, London: Allen Lane, 2018.
- Plokhy, Serhii. Forgotten Bastards of the Eastern Front. Oxford: Oxford University Press, 2019. 369 p. ISBN 978-0190061012
- Plokhy, Serhii. Nuclear Folly: A History of the Cuban Missile Crisis, New York: W. W. Norton & Company, 2021. ISBN 978-0-393-54081-9
- Plokhy, Serhii, The Frontline: Essays on Ukraine's Past and Present, Cambridge, MA: Ukrainian Research Institute, Harvard University, 2021. ISBN 978-0-674-26882-1
- Plokhy, Serhii. Atoms and Ashes: A Global History of Nuclear Disaster, New York: W. W. Norton & Company, 2022. ISBN 978-1-324-02104-9
- Plokhy, Serhii, The Russo-Ukrainian War: The Return of History. W. W. Norton & Company, 2023 ISBN 978-1324051190
- Plokhy, Serhii, Chernobyl Roulette: A War Story. United Kingdom: Allen Lane, 2024. ISBN 978-024168125-1
- Plokhy, Serhii, The Nuclear Age: An Epic Race for Arms, Power and Survival. W. W. Norton & Company, 2025. ISBN 978-1-324-05117-6
- Plokhy, Serhii, David and Goliath: Commentaries on the Russo-Ukrainian War. Harvard Ukrainian Research Institute, 2026. ISBN 978-0-674-30110-8
- Plokhy, Serhii, Killing the Pope: John Paul II and the Last Battle of the Cold War. London: Allen Lane, 2026. ISBN 978-0-241-77456-4

== See also ==
- Bibliography of Ukrainian history
- Bibliography of the history of the Early Slavs and Rus'
- The Origins of the Slavic Nations
- The Making of the Slavs: History and Archaeology of the Lower Danube Region by Florin Curta
