= Bibliography of Russian history (1991–present) =

This is a select bibliography of English language books (including translations) and journal articles about the history of Russia and its empire from 1991 to present. It specifically excludes topics related to the Dissolution of the Soviet Union; see Bibliography of the Post Stalinist Soviet Union for information on this subject. This bibliography is restricted to works about Russian history, and specifically excludes items such modern travel logs and guide books, popular culture, etc. (Note: Memoirs and diaries with a clear historical importance as shown by academic citations and publishing are included in a section.)

Works listed here are cited in the notes or bibliographies of scholarly sources. Each is published by an academic or major press, written by a recognized expert, or substantially reviewed in scholarly journals; borderline cases are omitted. A selection of primary sources are included. Many of the books below carry their own bibliographies; see the Further reading section for other bibliographies, and the External links section for historical sites, academic sites, and museums.

Citations follow APA style. (Note: Entries are in plain text APA 7 format without templates; templates are used only for reviews and notes.) Book have citations to academic journal or mainstream published reviews when available. For books only partly about the subject, relevant chapter or section titles are provided when useful and available. Translators of the original-language edition are included when possible. In cases where a title or name has appeared with more than one English spelling, the most recent published form is used and a footnote documents any earlier title under which the work appeared.

== Eastern European studies ==
- Fritz, V. (2007). State-building: A comparative study of Ukraine, Lithuania, Belarus, and Russia. Central European University Press.

== General surveys ==
- Hoffman, D. E. (2002). The oligarchs: Wealth and power in the new Russia. PublicAffairs.
- Knight, A. (2000). The enduring legacy of the KGB in Russian politics. Problems of Post-Communism, 47(4), 3–15. doi:10.1080/10758216.2000.11655889
- Reddaway, P., & Glinski, D. (2001). The tragedy of Russia's reforms: Market bolshevism against democracy. United States Institute of Peace Press.
- Treisman, D. (2011). The return: Russia's journey from Gorbachev to Medvedev. Free Press.

== Topical works ==
=== The arts ===
- Shkandrij, M. (2001). Russia and Ukraine: Literature and the discourse of empire from Napoleonic to postcolonial times. McGill-Queen's Press.

=== Democracy, elections and opposition ===
- Colton, T. J., & Hale, H. E. (2009). The Putin vote: Presidential electorates in a hybrid regime. Slavic Review, 68(3), 473–503. doi:10.1017/s0037677900019690
- Colton, T. J., & McFaul, M. (2003). Popular choice and managed democracy: The Russian elections of 1999 and 2000. Brookings Institution Press.
- Fish, M. S. (2005). Democracy derailed in Russia: The failure of open politics. Cambridge University Press. doi:10.1017/cbo9780511791062
- Golosov, G. V. (2011). The regional roots of electoral authoritarianism in Russia. Europe-Asia Studies, 63(4), 623–639. doi:10.1080/09668136.2011.566427
- Greene, S. A., & Robertson, G. B. (2019). Putin v. the people: The perilous politics of a divided Russia. Yale University Press. doi:10.12987/9780300245059
- Kulichkina, A., Righetti, N., & Waldherr, A. (2025). Protest and repression on social media: Pro-Navalny and pro-government mobilization dynamics and coordination patterns on Russian Twitter. New Media & Society, 27(9), 5433–5454. doi:10.1177/14614448241254126
- Peisakhin, L., Rozenas, A., & Sanovich, S. (2020). Mobilizing opposition voters under electoral authoritarianism: A field experiment in Russia. Research & Politics, 7(4). doi:10.1177/2053168020970746
- Robertson, G. B. (2011). The politics of protest in hybrid regimes: Managing dissent in post-communist Russia. Cambridge University Press. doi:10.1017/cbo9780511921209
- Romanov, D., Fominykh, I., & Ankudinov, I. (2023). Substituting the opposition under electoral authoritarianism: The case of the Russian regional parliamentary elections in 2021. Russian Politics, 8(4), 519–549. doi:10.30965/24518921-00803011
- Ross, C. (2011). Regional elections and electoral authoritarianism in Russia. Europe-Asia Studies, 63(4), 641–661. doi:10.1080/09668136.2011.566428
- Saikkonen, I. A.-L. (2017). Electoral mobilization and authoritarian elections: Evidence from post-Soviet Russia. Government and Opposition, 52(1), 51–74. doi:10.1017/gov.2015.20
- Semenov, A. (2020). Electoral performance and mobilization of opposition parties in Russia. Russian Politics, 5(2), 236–254. doi:10.30965/24518921-00502005
- Smyth, R. (2020). Elections, protest, and authoritarian regime stability: Russia 2008–2020. Cambridge University Press. doi:10.1017/9781108893251
- Wilson, A. (2005). Virtual politics: Faking democracy in the post-Soviet world. Yale University Press.

=== Economics ===
- Åslund, A. (2007). Russia's capitalist revolution: Why market reform succeeded and democracy failed. Peterson Institute for International Economics.
- Åslund, A. (2019). Russia's crony capitalism: The path from market economy to kleptocracy. Yale University Press.
- Barnes, A. (2006). Owning Russia: The struggle over factories, farms, and power. Cornell University Press. doi:10.7591/9781501726750
- Connolly, R. (2018). Russia's response to sanctions: How western economic statecraft is reshaping political economy in Russia. Cambridge University Press. doi:10.1017/9781108227346
- Connolly, R. (2020). The Russian economy: A very short introduction. Oxford University Press. doi:10.1093/actrade/9780198848905.001.0001
- Dawisha, K. (2014). Putin's kleptocracy: Who owns Russia?. Simon & Schuster.
- Frye, T. (2017). Property rights and property wrongs: How power, institutions, and norms shape economic conflict in Russia. Cambridge University Press. doi:10.1017/9781316661727
- Gaddy, C. G., & Ickes, B. W. (2013). Bear traps on Russia's road to modernization. Routledge. doi:10.4324/9780203383032
- Guriev, S., & Rachinsky, A. (2005). The role of oligarchs in Russian capitalism. Journal of Economic Perspectives, 19(1), 131–150. doi:10.1257/0895330053147994
- Miller, C. (2018). Putinomics: Power and money in resurgent Russia. University of North Carolina Press. doi:10.5149/northcarolina/9781469640662.001.0001
- Yakovlev, A. (2006). The evolution of business–state interaction in Russia: From state capture to business capture? Europe-Asia Studies, 58(7), 1033–1056. doi:10.1080/09668130600926256
- Zloch-Christy, I. (2010). East-West financial relations: Current problems and future prospects (Cambridge Russian, Soviet and Post-Soviet Studies). Cambridge University Press.

=== Empire ===
- Grigas, A. (2016). Beyond Crimea: The new Russian empire. Yale University Press. doi:10.12987/yale/9780300214505.001.0001
- Grinëv, A. V. (2020). Russian colonization of Alaska: Baranov's era, 1799–1818 (R. L. Bland, Trans.). University of Nebraska Press.
- Miller, C. (2021). We shall be masters: Russian pivots to East Asia from Peter the Great to Putin. Harvard University Press.
- Rigby, T. (1978). The Soviet regional leadership: The Brezhnev generation. Slavic Review, 37(1), 1–24.

=== Energy ===
- Balmaceda, M. M. (2008). Energy dependency, politics and corruption in the former Soviet Union: Russia's power, oligarchs' profits, and Ukraine's missing energy policy, 1995–2006. Routledge. doi:10.4324/9780203934340
- Balmaceda, M. M. (2021). Russian energy chains: The remaking of technopolitics from Siberia to Ukraine to the European Union (Woodrow Wilson Center Series). Columbia University Press.
- Boussena, S., & Locatelli, C. (2013). Energy institutional and organisational changes in EU and Russia: Revisiting gas relations. Energy Policy, 55, 180–189. doi:10.1016/j.enpol.2012.11.052
- Grigas, A. (2017). The new geopolitics of natural gas. Harvard University Press. doi:10.4159/9780674978065
- Gustafson, T. (2012). Wheel of fortune: The battle for oil and power in Russia. Harvard University Press.
- Harsem, Ø., & Claes, D. H. (2013). The interdependence of European–Russian energy relations. Energy Policy, 59, 784–791. doi:10.1016/j.enpol.2013.04.035
- Krickovic, A. (2015). When interdependence produces conflict: EU–Russia energy relations as a security dilemma. Contemporary Security Policy, 36(1), 3–26. doi:10.1080/13523260.2015.1012350
- Le Coq, C., & Paltseva, E. (2012). Assessing gas transit risks: Russia vs. the EU. Energy Policy, 42, 642–650. doi:10.1016/j.enpol.2011.12.037
- Lee, Y. (2017). Interdependence, issue importance, and the 2009 Russia-Ukraine gas conflict. Energy Policy, 102, 199–209. doi:10.1016/j.enpol.2016.11.038
- Mikulska, A., & Finley, M. (2024). Asymmetric interdependence and wielding the energy weapon: Russia and the EU post Russian invasion of Ukraine. Current Sustainable/Renewable Energy Reports, 11(2), 39–44. doi:10.1007/s40518-024-00234-9
- Romanova, T. (2021). Russia's political discourse on the EU's energy transition (2014–2019) and its effect on EU-Russia energy relations. Energy Policy, 154, Article 112309. doi:10.1016/j.enpol.2021.112309
- Rutland, P. (2008). Putin's economic record: Is the oil boom sustainable? Europe-Asia Studies, 60(6), 1051–1072. doi:10.1080/09668130802180975
- Siddi, M. (2020). Theorising conflict and cooperation in EU-Russia energy relations: Ideas, identities and material factors in the Nord Stream 2 debate. East European Politics, 36(4), 544–563. doi:10.1080/21599165.2019.1700955

=== Environment ===
- Gustafson, T. (2021). Klimat: Russia in the age of climate change. Harvard University Press.

=== Gender and family ===
- Blakkisrud, H., & Kolstø, P. (Eds.). (2025). Political legitimacy and traditional values in Putin's Russia. Edinburgh University Press. doi:10.1515/9781399539029
- Engel, B. A. (2021). Marriage, household, and home in modern Russia from Peter the Great to Vladimir Putin (The Bloomsbury History of Modern Russia Series). Bloomsbury Academic.
- Friedman, R. (2020). Modernity, domesticity and temporality in Russia: Time at home. Bloomsbury.
- Ilic, M. (Ed.). (2017). The Palgrave handbook of women and gender in twentieth-century Russia and the Soviet Union. Palgrave Macmillan.
- Kaminer, J. (2022). Haunted dreams: Fantasies of adolescence in post-Soviet culture (NIU Series in Slavic, East European, and Eurasian Studies). Northern Illinois University Press.
- Kolstø, P. (2025). Family, sex, and faith. Cornell University Press. doi:10.7591/cornell/9781501779411.001.0001
- Riabov, O., & Riabova, T. (2014). The remasculinization of Russia? Problems of Post-Communism, 61(2), 23–35. doi:10.2753/ppc1075-8216610202
- Silvan, K. (2022). From state to society: The Komsomol in Yeltsin's Russia. Kritika: Explorations in Russian and Eurasian History, 23(2), 289–314.
- Sperling, V. (2014). Sex, politics, and Putin: Political legitimacy in Russia. Oxford University Press. doi:10.1093/acprof:oso/9780199324347.001.0001
- Stoeckl, K. (2023). Traditional values, family, homeschooling: The role of Russia and the Russian Orthodox Church in transnational moral conservative networks and their efforts at reshaping human rights. International Journal of Constitutional Law, 21(1), 224–242. doi:10.1093/icon/moad026
- Tomiak, J. (1992). Education in the Baltic States, Ukraine, Belarus' and Russia. Comparative Education, 28(1), 33–44.

==== LGBTQ ====
- Coleman, E. J., & Sandfort, T. (2014). Sexuality and gender in postcommunist Eastern Europe and Russia. Routledge. doi:10.4324/9781315864730
- Edenborg, E. (2017). Politics of visibility and belonging: From Russia's "homosexual propaganda" laws to the Ukraine war. Routledge.
- Edenborg, E. (2023). Anti-gender politics as discourse coalitions: Russia's domestic and international promotion of "traditional values". Problems of Post-Communism, 70(2), 175–184. doi:10.1080/10758216.2021.1987269
- Persson, E. (2015). Banning "homosexual propaganda": Belonging and visibility in contemporary Russian media. Sexuality & Culture, 19(2), 256–274. doi:10.1007/s12119-014-9254-1
- Verpoest, L. (2017). The end of rhetorics: LGBT policies in Russia and the European Union. Studia Diplomatica, 68(4), 3–20.
- Wilkinson, C. (2014). Putting "traditional values" into practice: The rise and contestation of anti-homopropaganda laws in Russia. Journal of Human Rights, 13(3), 363–379. doi:10.1080/14754835.2014.919218

=== Government and domestic politics ===
- Baker, P., & Glasser, S. (2005). Kremlin rising: Vladimir Putin's Russia and the end of revolution. Scribner.
- Frye, T. (2021). Weak strongman: The limits of power in Putin's Russia. Princeton University Press. doi:10.1515/9780691216980
- Frye, T., Gehlbach, S., Marquardt, K. L., & Reuter, O. J. (2016). Is Putin's popularity real? Post-Soviet Affairs, 33(1), 1–15. doi:10.1080/1060586x.2016.1144334
- Gel'man, V. (2015). Authoritarian Russia: Analyzing post-Soviet regime changes. University of Pittsburgh Press.
- Gel'man, V. (2022). The politics of bad governance in contemporary Russia. University of Michigan Press. doi:10.3998/mpub.11621795
- Gill, G. (2015). Building an authoritarian polity: Russia in post-Soviet times. Cambridge University Press. doi:10.1017/cbo9781316417720
- Guriev, S., & Treisman, D. (2019). Informational autocrats. Journal of Economic Perspectives, 33(4), 100–127. doi:10.1257/jep.33.4.100
- Hale, H. E. (2015). Patronal politics: Eurasian regime dynamics in comparative perspective. Cambridge University Press.
- Judah, B. (2013). Fragile empire: How Russia fell in and out of love with Vladimir Putin. Yale University Press. doi:10.12987/9780300185256
- Laruelle, M. (2020). Making sense of Russia's illiberalism. Journal of Democracy, 31(3), 115–129. doi:10.1353/jod.2020.0049
- Ledeneva, A. V. (2013). Can Russia modernise? Sistema, power networks and informal governance. Cambridge University Press.
- Magyar, B., & Madlovics, B. (2020). The anatomy of post-communist regimes: A conceptual framework. Central European University Press.
- Moses, J. C. (2014). The political resurrection of Russian governors. Europe-Asia Studies, 66(9), 1395–1424.
- Petrov, N., Lipman, M., & Hale, H. E. (2013). Three dilemmas of hybrid regime governance: Russia from Putin to Putin. Post-Soviet Affairs, 30(1), 1–26. doi:10.1080/1060586x.2013.825140
- Reuter, O. J. (2017). The origins of dominant parties: Building authoritarian institutions in post-Soviet Russia. Cambridge University Press. doi:10.1017/9781316761649
- Sakwa, R. (2010). The crisis of Russian democracy: The dual state, factionalism and the Medvedev succession. Cambridge University Press. doi:10.1017/cbo9780511779831
- Sakwa, R. (2014). Putin redux: Power and contradiction in contemporary Russia. Routledge. doi:10.4324/9781315781037
- Shevtsova, L. (2003). Putin's Russia. Carnegie Endowment for International Peace.
- Treisman, D. (2011). Presidential popularity in a hybrid regime: Russia under Yeltsin and Putin. American Journal of Political Science, 55(3), 590–609. doi:10.1111/j.1540-5907.2010.00500.x
- Zygar, M. (2016). All the Kremlin's men: Inside the court of Vladimir Putin. PublicAffairs.

=== Judicial and legal ===
- Bækken, H. (2019). Law and power in Russia: Making sense of quasi-legal practices. Routledge.
- Dzmitryieva, A., Titaev, K., & Chetverikova, I. (2016). The state and business at arbitrazh courts. Russian Politics & Law, 54(2–3), 281–311. doi:10.1080/10611940.2016.1176838
- Hendley, K. (2005). Accelerated procedure in the Russian arbitrazh courts: A case study of unintended consequences. Problems of Post-Communism, 52(6), 21–31. doi:10.1080/10758216.2005.11052220
- Hendley, K. (2012). Assessing the role of the justice-of-the-peace courts in the Russian judicial system. Review of Central and East European Law, 37(4), 377–393. doi:10.1163/092598812x13274154886980
- Hendley, K. (2024). Is justice possible in Russian courts? A case study of housing disputes. Indiana International & Comparative Law Review, 34(3), 455–487. doi:10.18060/28442
- Huskey, E. (1999). Presidential power in Russia. M. E. Sharpe.
- Hutcheson, D. S., & McAllister, I. (2021). Consolidating the Putin regime: The 2020 referendum on Russia's constitutional amendments. Russian Politics, 6(3), 355–376. doi:10.30965/24518921-00603004
- Sakwa, R. (2010). The dual state in Russia. Post-Soviet Affairs, 26(3), 185–206. doi:10.2747/1060-586x.26.3.185
- Solomon, P. (2005). Threats of judicial counterreform in Putin's Russia. Demokratizatsiya: The Journal of Post-Soviet Democratization, 13(3), 325–346. doi:10.3200/demo.13.3.325-346
- Trochev, A. (2004). Less democracy, more courts: A puzzle of judicial review in Russia. Law & Society Review, 38(3), 513–548. doi:10.1111/j.0023-9216.2004.00056.x
- Trochev, A. (2012). Suing Russia at home. Problems of Post-Communism, 59(5), 18–34. doi:10.2753/ppc1075-8216590502
- Vereshchagin, A. (2007). Judicial law-making in post-Soviet Russia. Routledge-Cavendish. doi:10.4324/9780203945193

=== Media and propaganda ===
- Beumers, B., Hutchings, S., & Rulyova, N. (Eds.). (2008). The post-Soviet Russian media. Routledge. doi:10.4324/9780203886625
- Gorham, M. S. (2014). After newspeak: Language culture and politics in Russia from Gorbachev to Putin. Cornell University Press. doi:10.7591/cornell/9780801452628.001.0001
- Hutchings, S., & Tolz, V. (2012). Fault lines in Russia's discourse of nation: Television coverage of the December 2010 Moscow riots. Slavic Review, 71(4), 873–899. doi:10.5612/slavicreview.71.4.0873
- Hutchings, S., & Tolz, V. (2015). Nation, ethnicity and race on Russian television: Mediating post-Soviet difference. Routledge. doi:10.4324/9781315722863
- Khaldarova, I. (2021). Brother or 'other'? Transformation of strategic narratives in Russian television news during the Ukrainian crisis. Media, War & Conflict, 14(1), 3–20. doi:10.1177/1750635219846016
- Livers, K. A. (2020). Conspiracy culture. University of Toronto Press. doi:10.3138/9781487536114
- Oates, S. (2007). The neo-Soviet model of the media. Europe-Asia Studies, 59(8), 1279–1297. doi:10.1080/09668130701655150
- Pomerantsev, P. (2014). Nothing is true and everything is possible: The surreal heart of the new Russia. PublicAffairs.
- Skillen, D. (2016). Freedom of speech in Russia: Politics and media from Gorbachev to Putin. Routledge. doi:10.4324/9781315766256
- Sykes, A. (2023). Livid about liberalism: Putin, state controlled television and Kremlin portrayals of liberalism. Russian Politics, 8(3), 331–352. doi:10.30965/24518921-00803003
- Wijermars, M. (2018). Memory politics in contemporary Russia: Television, cinema and the state. Routledge. doi:10.4324/9781351007207

=== Military and security ===
- Belton, C. (2020). Putin's people: How the KGB took back Russia and then took on the West. Farrar, Straus and Giroux.
- Bukkvoll, T. (2015). Military innovation under authoritarian government – The case of Russian special operations forces. Journal of Strategic Studies, 38(5), 602–625. doi:10.1080/01402390.2015.1056342
- Fedor, J. (2011). Russia and the cult of state security: The Chekist tradition, from Lenin to Putin. Routledge.
- Galeotti, M. (2018). The mythical 'Gerasimov doctrine' and the language of threat. Critical Studies on Security, 7(2), 157–161. doi:10.1080/21624887.2018.1441623
- Galeotti, M. (2019). Russian political war: Moving beyond the hybrid. Routledge. doi:10.4324/9780429443442
- Herspring, D. R. (2006). The Kremlin and the high command: Presidential impact on the Russian military from Gorbachev to Putin. University Press of Kansas.
- Monaghan, A. (2017). Power in modern Russia: Strategy and mobilisation. Manchester University Press.
- Renz, B. (2006). Putin's militocracy? An alternative interpretation of siloviki in contemporary Russian politics. Europe-Asia Studies, 58(6), 903–924. doi:10.1080/09668130600831134
- Renz, B. (2018). Russia's military revival. Polity Press.
- Soldatov, A., & Borogan, I. (2010). The new nobility: The restoration of Russia's security state and the enduring legacy of the KGB. PublicAffairs.
- Soldatov, A., & Borogan, I. (2015). The red web: The struggle between Russia's digital dictators and the new online revolutionaries. PublicAffairs.
- Taylor, B. D. (2011). State building in Putin's Russia: Policing and coercion after communism. Cambridge University Press.

==== Chechnya ====
- Dunlop, J. B. (1998). Russia confronts Chechnya: Roots of a separatist conflict. Cambridge University Press. doi:10.1017/cbo9780511612077
- Evangelista, M. (2002). The Chechen wars: Will Russia go the way of the Soviet Union?. Brookings Institution Press.
- Gilligan, E. (2009). Terror in Chechnya: Russia and the tragedy of civilians in war. Princeton University Press. doi:10.1515/9781400831760
- Hughes, J. (2007). Chechnya: From nationalism to jihad. University of Pennsylvania Press. doi:10.9783/9780812202311
- Kramer, M. (2005). The perils of counterinsurgency: Russia's war in Chechnya. International Security, 29(3), 5–63. doi:10.1162/0162288043467450
- Lieven, A. (1998). Chechnya: Tombstone of Russian power. Yale University Press.
- Russell, J. (2005). Terrorists, bandits, spooks and thieves: Russian demonisation of the Chechens before and since 9/11. Third World Quarterly, 26(1), 101–116. doi:10.1080/0143659042000322937
- Russell, J. (2007). Chechnya: Russia's "war on terror". Routledge. doi:10.4324/9780203946664
- Sakwa, R. (Ed.). (2005). Chechnya: From past to future. Anthem Press. doi:10.7135/upo/9781843313618
- Souleimanov, E. A., & Aliyev, H. (2014). Asymmetry of values, indigenous forces, and incumbent success in counterinsurgency: Evidence from Chechnya. Journal of Strategic Studies, 38(5), 678–703. doi:10.1080/01402390.2014.952409
- Tishkov, V. (2004). Chechnya: Life in a war-torn society. University of California Press.
- Wilhelmsen, J. (2005). Between a rock and a hard place: The Islamisation of the Chechen separatist movement. Europe-Asia Studies, 57(1), 35–59. doi:10.1080/0966813052000314101

==== Nuclear weapons and arms control ====
- Adamsky, D. (2014a). If war comes tomorrow: Russian thinking about 'regional nuclear deterrence'. The Journal of Slavic Military Studies, 27(1), 163–188. doi:10.1080/13518046.2014.874852
- Adamsky, D. (2014b). Nuclear incoherence: Deterrence theory and non-strategic nuclear weapons in Russia. Journal of Strategic Studies, 37(1), 91–134. doi:10.1080/01402390.2013.798583
- Adamsky, D. (2019). Russian nuclear orthodoxy: Religion, politics, and strategy. Stanford University Press.
- Adamsky, D. (2025). Quo vadis, Russian deterrence? Strategic culture and coercion innovations. International Security, 49(3), 50–83. doi:10.1162/isec_a_00502
- Anichkina, T., Péczeli, A., & Roth, N. (2017). The future of US–Russian nuclear deterrence and arms control. Bulletin of the Atomic Scientists, 73(4), 271–278. doi:10.1080/00963402.2017.1338046
- Cimbala, S. J. (2018). After New START: US modernization, Moscow, and nuclear arms control. The Journal of Slavic Military Studies, 31(4), 409–422. doi:10.1080/13518046.2018.1521357
- Rogers, J., Korda, M., & Kristensen, H. M. (2022). The long view: Strategic arms control after the New START Treaty. Bulletin of the Atomic Scientists, 78(6), 347–368. doi:10.1080/00963402.2022.2133287
- Ven Bruusgaard, K. (2016). Russian strategic deterrence. Survival, 58(4), 7–26. doi:10.1080/00396338.2016.1207945
- Ven Bruusgaard, K. (2021). Russian nuclear strategy and conventional inferiority. Journal of Strategic Studies, 44(1), 3–35. doi:10.1080/01402390.2020.1818070
- Warren, S. A. (2025). Russian novel nuclear weapons and strategic nuclear deterrence between the United States and Russia. Comparative Strategy, 44(5), 600–621. doi:10.1080/01495933.2025.2499828

=== Nationalism ===
- Aksiumov, B., & Avksentev, V. (2022). Nation-building in contemporary Russia: Four vectors of political discourse. Nationalism and Ethnic Politics, 28(2), 186–205. doi:10.1080/13537113.2021.2001206
- Aleksashenko, S. (2018). Putin's counterrevolution. Brookings Institution Press.
- Bechev, D., Popescu, N., & Secrieru, S. (Eds.). (2021). Russia rising: Putin's foreign policy in the Middle East and North Africa. I.B. Tauris.
- Blakkisrud, H. (2016). Blurring the boundary between civic and ethnic: The Kremlin's new approach to national identity under Putin's third term. In P. Kolstø & H. Blakkisrud (Eds.), The new Russian nationalism (pp. 249–274). Edinburgh University Press. doi:10.3366/edinburgh/9781474410427.003.0010
- Clover, C. (2016). Black wind, white snow: The rise of Russia's new nationalism. Yale University Press.
- Confino, M. (1991). Solzhenitsyn, the West, and the new Russian nationalism. Journal of Contemporary History, 26(3/4), 611–636.
- Goode, J. P. (2021). Patriotic legitimation and everyday patriotism in Russia's constitutional reform. Russian Politics, 6(1), 112–129. doi:10.30965/24518921-00601007
- Goode, J. P. (2025). Russian propaganda from V to Z: Projecting banal and everyday nationalism in unsettled times. Nationalities Papers, 54(2), 232–252. doi:10.1017/nps.2025.28
- Gudkov, L. (2011). The nature of "Putinism". Russian Social Science Review, 52(6), 21–47. doi:10.1080/10611428.2011.11065455
- Hill, R. J., & Cappelli, O. (Eds.). (2010). Putin and Putinism. Routledge.
- Horvath, R. (2020). Putin's fascists: Russkii Obraz and the politics of managed nationalism in Russia. Routledge.
- Hryb, O. (2020). Understanding contemporary Ukrainian and Russian nationalism: The post-Soviet Cossack revival and Ukraine's national security. ibidem-Verlag.
- Kolstø, P. (2016). Crimea vs. Donbas: How Putin won Russian nationalist support-and lost it again. Slavic Review, 75(3), 702–725.
- Kolstø, P., & Blakkisrud, H. (Eds.). (2016). The new Russian nationalism: Imperialism, ethnicity and authoritarianism 2000–15. Edinburgh University Press. doi:10.1515/9781474410434
- Laruelle, M. (2008). Russian Eurasianism: An ideology of empire. Johns Hopkins University Press.
- Laruelle, M. (2015). Russia as a "divided nation," from compatriots to Crimea: A contribution to the discussion on nationalism and foreign policy. Problems of Post-Communism, 62(2), 88–97. doi:10.1080/10758216.2015.1010902
- Laruelle, M. (2016). Russia as an anti-liberal European civilisation. In P. Kolstø & H. Blakkisrud (Eds.), The new Russian nationalism (pp. 275–297). Edinburgh University Press. doi:10.3366/edinburgh/9781474410427.003.0011
- Laruelle, M. (2018). Russian nationalism: Imaginaries, doctrines, and political battlefields. Routledge. doi:10.4324/9780429426773
- Laruelle, M. (2021). Is Russia fascist? Unraveling propaganda East and West. Cornell University Press.
- March, L. (2012). Nationalism for export? The domestic and foreign-policy implications of the new "Russian idea". Europe-Asia Studies, 64(3), 401–425.
- Petro, N. N. (1990). Russian nationalism: Toward a new Russian federation. The Wilson Quarterly, 14(3), 114–122.
- Sharafutdinova, G. (2020). The red mirror: Putin's leadership and Russia's insecure identity. Oxford University Press. doi:10.1093/oso/9780197502938.001.0001
- Shevel, O. (2011). Russian nation-building from Yel'tsin to Medvedev: Ethnic, civic or purposefully ambiguous? Europe-Asia Studies, 63(2), 179–202. doi:10.1080/09668136.2011.547693
- Shnirelman, V. A. (1999). Passions about Arkaim: Russian nationalism, the Aryans, and the politics of archaeology. Inner Asia, 1(2), 267–282.
- Stoner, K. (2025). Why does Putinism endure? Dialoguing with the dictator. Political Science Quarterly. doi:10.1093/psquar/qqae125
- Tabachnik, A. (2020). Russian intervention in Ukraine: History, identity politics, and national consolidation. Nationalism and Ethnic Politics, 26(3), 299–318. doi:10.1080/13537113.2020.1792817
- Taylor, B. D. (2018). The code of Putinism. Oxford University Press.
- Van Herpen, M. H. (2013). Putinism: The slow rise of a radical right regime in Russia. Palgrave Macmillan. doi:10.1057/9781137282811
- Verkhovsky, A. (2000). Ultra-nationalists in Russia at the onset of Putin's rule. Nationalities Papers, 28(4), 707–722.
- Wegren, S. K. (2018). Putin's Russia: Past imperfect, future uncertain (7th ed.). Rowman & Littlefield.
- Wegren, S. K. (2022). Putin's Russia (8th ed.). Rowman & Littlefield.

=== Religion ===
- Adams, A. S., & Shevzov, V. (Eds.). (2018). Framing Mary: The Mother of God in modern, revolutionary, and post-Soviet Russian culture. Northern Illinois University Press.
- Curanović, A. (2010). Relations between the Orthodox Church and Islam in the Russian Federation. Journal of Church and State, 52(3), 503–539. doi:10.1093/jcs/csq089
- Garrard, J., & Garrard, C. (2008). Russian Orthodoxy resurgent: Faith and power in the new Russia. Princeton University Press. doi:10.1515/9781400828999
- Knox, Z. (2005). Russian society and the Orthodox Church: Religion in Russia after communism. Routledge. doi:10.4324/9780203014530
- Papkova, I. (2011). The Orthodox Church and Russian politics. Oxford University Press.
- Richters, K. (2012). The post-Soviet Russian Orthodox Church: Politics, culture and the greater Russia. Routledge. doi:10.4324/9780203115732
- Shakhanova, G., & Kratochvíl, P. (2022). The patriotic turn in Russia: Political convergence of the Russian Orthodox Church and the state? Politics and Religion, 15(1), 114–141. doi:10.1017/s1755048320000620
- Shestopalets, D. (2019). The Ukrainian Orthodox Church of the Moscow Patriarchate, the state and the Russian-Ukrainian crisis, 2014–2018. Politics, Religion & Ideology, 20(1), 42–63. doi:10.1080/21567689.2018.1554482
- Sibgatullina, G. (2020). Languages of Islam and Christianity in post-Soviet Russia (Studies in Slavic and General Linguistics). Brill.
- Soroka, G. (2022). International relations by proxy? The Kremlin and the Russian Orthodox Church. Religions, 13(3), Article 208. doi:10.3390/rel13030208
- Stähle, H. (2021). Russian church in the digital era. Routledge. doi:10.4324/9780367814380
- Stoeckl, K. (2014). The Russian Orthodox Church and human rights. Routledge. doi:10.4324/9781315818788
- Stoeckl, K. (2016). The Russian Orthodox Church as moral norm entrepreneur. Religion, State and Society, 44(2), 132–151. doi:10.1080/09637494.2016.1194010

=== Russo-Ukrainian War ===
This section primarily covers the period from 2014–present.

- Brands, H. (Ed.). (2024). War in Ukraine: Conflict, Strategy, and the Return of a Fractured World. Johns Hopkins University Press.
- Clark, E., & Vovk, D. (Eds.). (2020). Religion During the Russian Ukrainian Conflict. New York: Routledge.
- D'Anieri, P. (2019). Ukraine and Russia: From Civilized Divorce to Uncivil War. Cambridge: Cambridge University Press.
- Galeotti, M. (2019). The Armies of Russia's War in Ukraine. Osprey. (Osprey Elite Series).
- Grigas, A. (2016). Beyond Crimea: The New Russian Empire. New Haven: Yale University Press.
- Grzebyk, Patrycja; Uczkiewicz, Dominika, eds. (2025). The Russian-Ukrainian Conflict and War Crimes Challenges for Documentation and International Prosecution. Abingdon. doi:10.4324/9781003493785. ISBN 978-1-032-79770-0.
- Hansen, A., Rogatchevski, A., Steinholt, Y., & Wickström, D. (2019). A War of Songs: Popular Music and Recent Russia-Ukraine Relations. Stuttgart: ibidem-Verlag; distributed by Columbia University Press.
- Menon, R., Rumer, E. B., & Chasman, D. (2015). Conflict in Ukraine: The Unwinding of the Post–Cold War Order. MIT Press.
- Plokhy, S. (2023) The Russo-Ukrainian War: The Return of History. W. W. Norton.
- Wood, E., Pomeranz, W., Merry, E. W., & Trudolyubov, M. (2015). Roots of Russia’s War in Ukraine. New York: Woodrow Wilson Center Press and Columbia University Press.

=== Other ===
- MacWilliams, B. (2014). With light steam: A personal journey through the Russian baths (NIU Series in Slavic, East European, and Eurasian Studies). Northern Illinois University Press.
- Wegren, S. K. (with A. Nikulin & I. Trotsuk). (2020). Russia's food revolution: The transformation of the food system (Routledge Contemporary Russia and Eastern Europe Series). Routledge.

== Foreign relations ==
- Clunan, A. L. (2009). The social construction of Russia's resurgence: Aspirations, identity, and security interests. Johns Hopkins University Press. doi:10.1353/book.3410
- Larson, D. W., & Shevchenko, A. (2010). Status seekers: Chinese and Russian responses to U.S. primacy. International Security, 34(4), 63–95. doi:10.1162/isec.2010.34.4.63
- Lo, B. (2015). Russia and the new world disorder. Royal Institute of International Affairs. doi:10.5040/9780815752486
- Mankoff, J. (2011). Russian foreign policy: The return of great power politics. Rowman & Littlefield. doi:10.5040/9798216385547
- Monaghan, A. (2016). The new politics of Russia: Interpreting change. Manchester University Press. doi:10.7765/9781784997632
- Neumann, I. B. (2008). Russia as a great power, 1815–2007. Journal of International Relations and Development, 11(2), 128–151. doi:10.1057/jird.2008.7
- Ohanyan, A. (Ed.). (2018). Russia abroad: Driving regional fracture in post-Communist Eurasia and beyond. Georgetown University Press.
- Orenstein, M. A. (2019). The lands in between: Russia vs. the West and the new politics of hybrid war. Oxford University Press.
- Sakwa, R. (2017). Russia against the rest: The post-Cold War crisis of world order. Cambridge University Press. doi:10.1017/9781316675885
- Stent, A. (2019). Putin's world: Russia against the West and with the rest. Twelve.
- Trenin, D. (2011). Post-imperium: A Eurasian story. Carnegie Endowment for International Peace. JSTOR j.ctt6wpjpz
- Tsygankov, A. P. (2022). Russia's foreign policy: Change and continuity in national identity. Rowman & Littlefield. doi:10.5040/9798216413196
- Tsygankov, A. P. (Ed.). (2018). Routledge handbook of Russian foreign policy. Routledge. doi:10.4324/9781315536934

=== Relations with the West ===
- Casier, T., & DeBardeleben, J. (Eds.). (2017). EU–Russia relations in crisis. Routledge. doi:10.4324/9781315444567
- Forsberg, T., & Haukkala, H. (2016). The European Union and Russia. Palgrave Macmillan. doi:10.1007/978-1-137-35535-5
- Haukkala, H. (2015). From cooperative to contested Europe? The conflict in Ukraine as a culmination of a long-term crisis in EU–Russia relations. Journal of Contemporary European Studies, 23(1), 25–40. doi:10.1080/14782804.2014.1001822
- Krastev, I., & Holmes, S. (2019). The light that failed: Why the West is losing the fight for democracy. Pegasus Books.
- Legvold, R. (2016). Return to Cold War. Polity Press.
- McFaul, M. (2018). From Cold War to hot peace: An American ambassador in Putin's Russia. Houghton Mifflin Harcourt.
- Sakwa, R. (2008). 'New Cold War' or twenty years' crisis? Russia and international politics. International Affairs, 84(2), 241–267. doi:10.1111/j.1468-2346.2008.00702.x
- Sarotte, M. E. (2021). Not one inch: America, Russia, and the making of post-Cold War stalemate. Yale University Press.
- Shifrinson, J. R. I. (2016). Deal or no deal? The end of the Cold War and the U.S. offer to limit NATO expansion. International Security, 40(4), 7–44. doi:10.1162/isec_a_00236
- Snyder, T. (2018). The road to unfreedom: Russia, Europe, America. Crown.
- Stent, A. E. (2014). The limits of partnership: U.S.-Russian relations in the twenty-first century. Princeton University Press.
- Trenin, D. (2016). Should we fear Russia?. Polity Press.

=== Relations with Asia ===
- Bolt, P. J., & Cross, S. N. (2018). China, Russia, and twenty-first century global geopolitics. Oxford University Press. doi:10.1093/oso/9780198719519.001.0001
- Brown, J. D. J. (2016). Japan, Russia and their territorial dispute: The northern delusion. Routledge. doi:10.4324/9781315638980
- Gabuev, A. (2018). Unwanted but inevitable: Russia's deepening partnership with China post-Ukraine. In Sino-Russian relations in the 21st century (pp. 41–66). Springer International Publishing. doi:10.1007/978-3-319-92516-5_3
- Kaczmarski, M. (2015). Russia–China relations in the post-crisis international order. Routledge. doi:10.4324/9781315757803
- Korolev, A. (2018). On the verge of an alliance: Contemporary China-Russia military cooperation. Asian Security, 15(3), 233–252. doi:10.1080/14799855.2018.1463991
- Lo, B. (2008). Axis of convenience: Moscow, Beijing, and the new geopolitics. Brookings Institution Press.
- Lukin, A. (2018). China and Russia: The new rapprochement. Polity.
- Rozman, G. (2014). The Sino-Russian challenge to the world order: National identities, bilateral relations, and East versus West in the 2010s. Stanford University Press.
- Wishnick, E. (2016). In search of the 'Other' in Asia: Russia–China relations revisited. The Pacific Review, 30(1), 114–132. doi:10.1080/09512748.2016.1201129

=== Middle East ===
- Dannreuther, R. (2015). Russia and the Arab Spring: Supporting the counter-revolution. Journal of European Integration, 37(1), 77–94. doi:10.1080/07036337.2014.975990
- Dannreuther, R. (2019). Understanding Russia's return to the Middle East. International Politics, 56(6), 726–742. doi:10.1057/s41311-018-0165-x
- Freedman, R. O. (2018). From Khrushchev and Brezhnev to Putin: Has Moscow's policy in the Middle East come full circle? Contemporary Review of the Middle East, 5(2), 102–115. doi:10.1177/2347798918762197
- Kozhanov, N. (Ed.). (2022). Russian foreign policy towards the Middle East: New trends, old traditions. Hurst. doi:10.14375/np.9781787388543
- Trenin, D. (2018). What is Russia up to in the Middle East?. Polity.
- Vasiliev, A. (2018). Russia's Middle East policy: From Lenin to Putin. Routledge. doi:10.4324/9781315121826

==== Syria ====
- Adamsky, D. (2020). Russian campaign in Syria – change and continuity in strategic culture. Journal of Strategic Studies, 43(1), 104–125. doi:10.1080/01402390.2019.1668273
- Allison, R. (2013). Russia and Syria: Explaining alignment with a regime in crisis. International Affairs, 89(4), 795–823. doi:10.1111/1468-2346.12046
- Averre, D., & Davies, L. (2015). Russia, humanitarian intervention and the Responsibility to Protect: The case of Syria. International Affairs, 91(4), 813–834. doi:10.1111/1468-2346.12343
- Blanga, U. (2020). Syria–Russia and the "Arab Spring": A reassessment. Middle East Policy, 27(4), 62–82. doi:10.1111/mepo.12527
- Borshchevskaya, A. (2022). Putin's war in Syria: Russian foreign policy and the price of America's absence. I.B. Tauris. doi:10.5040/9780755634668
- Geukjian, O. (2022). The Russian military intervention in Syria. McGill-Queen's University Press. doi:10.1515/9780228009450
- Kozhanov, N. (2019). From Russia's military deployment in Syria to the Astana process. In R. Hinnebusch & A. Saouli (Eds.), The war for Syria (pp. 245–260). Routledge. doi:10.4324/9780429201967-15
- Mason, R. (2018). Russia in Syria: An unequivocal return to the Middle East? Middle East Policy, 25(4), 101–115. doi:10.1111/mepo.12381
- Notte, H. (2016). Russia in Chechnya and Syria: Pursuit of strategic goals. Middle East Policy, 23(1), 59–74. doi:10.1111/mepo.12174
- Phillips, C. (2016). The battle for Syria: International rivalry in the new Middle East. Yale University Press.

==== Israel ====
- Freedman, R. O. (2014). Israel and Russia: Jerusalem and its relations with Moscow under Putin. In C. Shindler (Ed.), Israel and the world powers. I.B. Tauris. doi:10.5040/9780755611522.ch-006
- Freedman, R. O. (2023). Moscow and Jerusalem: A troubled 75-year relationship. Israel Affairs, 29(3), 492–511. doi:10.1080/13537121.2023.2206211
- Magen, Z. (2019). Russia and Israel. In R. O. Freedman (Ed.), Israel under Netanyahu (pp. 262–272). Routledge. doi:10.4324/9780429342349-14
- Melamedov, G. (2018). Putin and the Iranian–Israeli conflict. Israel Journal of Foreign Affairs, 12(2), 163–178. doi:10.1080/23739770.2018.1525655
- Rakov, D. (2024). Israel and Russia. In J. Peters & R. Geist Pinfold (Eds.), Routledge handbook on Israel's foreign relations (pp. 180–192). Routledge. doi:10.4324/9781003048398-18

=== Africa ===
- Antwi-Boasiako, I. (2022). The quest for influence: Examining Russia's public diplomacy mechanisms in Africa. South African Journal of International Affairs, 29(4), 463–482. doi:10.1080/10220461.2022.2153728
- Doboš, B. (2024). The wolf I feed: Typology of the Wagner Group in Africa. Russian Politics, 9(4), 555–578. doi:10.30965/24518921-00904005
- Duursma, A., & Masuhr, N. (2022). Russia's return to Africa in a historical and global context: Anti-imperialism, patronage, and opportunism. South African Journal of International Affairs, 29(4), 407–423. doi:10.1080/10220461.2022.2136236
- Faulkner, C. M., Parens, R., & Clarke, C. P. (2026). Moscow's mercenaries. Columbia University Press. doi:10.7312/faul21691
- Filatova, I. (2015). Third time lucky? Establishing diplomatic relations between Russia and South Africa. South African Journal of International Affairs, 22(4), 447–462. doi:10.1080/10220461.2015.1115369
- Gruzd, S., Ramani, S., & Clifford, C. (2022). Russia in Africa: Who is courting whom? South African Journal of International Affairs, 29(4), 401–405. doi:10.1080/10220461.2022.2146184
- Ishiyama, J. (2025). Wagner PMC's impact on Russia's public image in Africa. Journal of Asian and African Studies, 60(7), 4307–4321. doi:10.1177/00219096241249974
- Marten, K. (2019). Russia's use of semi-state security forces: The case of the Wagner Group. Post-Soviet Affairs, 35(3), 181–204. doi:10.1080/1060586x.2019.1591142
- Mathew, J., & Moolakkattu, J. S. (2022). Russia in the Horn of Africa: Re-engagement in a new strategic environment. South African Journal of International Affairs, 29(4), 535–548. doi:10.1080/10220461.2022.2149615
- Mensah, A. N. A., & Aning, K. (2022). Russia resurgent? Untangling the role and meaning of Moscow's proxies in West Africa and the Sahel. Strategic Review for Southern Africa, 44(1). doi:10.35293/srsa.v44i1.4058
- Neethling, T. (2023). Russian para-military operations in Africa: The Wagner Group as a de facto foreign policy instrument. Scientia Militaria, 51(1). doi:10.5787/51-1-1403
- Ramani, S. (2023). Russia in Africa: Resurgent great power or bellicose pretender?. Hurst. doi:10.14375/np.9781805260271
- Tsygankov, A. P., & Muhwezi, A. (2025). Engaging the Global South with ideology and pragmatism: Russia's re-emergence in sub-Saharan Africa. Global Studies Quarterly, 5(2), Article ksaf044. doi:10.1093/isagsq/ksaf044

=== Relations with neighboring countries ===
- Toal, G. (2017). Near abroad: Putin, the West, and the contest over Ukraine and the Caucasus. Oxford University Press. doi:10.1093/oso/9780190253301.001.0001

==== Belarus ====
- Astapova, A. (2021). Humor and rumor in the post-Soviet authoritarian state. Rowman & Littlefield. doi:10.5040/9781666995466
- Bekus, N. (2021). Echo of 1989? Protest imaginaries and identity dilemmas in Belarus. Slavic Review, 80(1), 4–14. doi:10.1017/slr.2021.25
- Bekus, N. (2023). Reassembling society in a nation-state: History, language, and identity discourses of Belarus. Nationalities Papers, 51(1), 98–113. doi:10.1017/nps.2022.60
- Bekus, N. (2025). Belarus in the long shadow of 2020. Current History, 124(864), 255–261. doi:10.1525/curh.2025.124.864.255
- Frear, M. (2018). Belarus under Lukashenka: Adaptive authoritarianism. Routledge. doi:10.4324/9780203737910
- Kazharski, A. (2021). Belarus' new political nation? 2020 anti-authoritarian protests as identity building. New Perspectives, 29(1), 69–79. doi:10.1177/2336825x20984340
- Korosteleva, E., Petrova, I., & Kudlenko, A. (Eds.). (2023). Belarus in the twenty first century: Between dictatorship and democracy. Routledge.
- Marples, D. R. (2025). The creation of a dictator: The path to the Lukashenka presidency in Belarus. Journal of Belarusian Studies, 13(2), 103–125. doi:10.30965/20526512-bja10021
- Nizhnikau, R. (2024). Catch 2020: Explaining the performance of the EU policy towards Belarus. International Politics, 61(6), 1151–1173. doi:10.1057/s41311-022-00406-8
- Way, L., & Tolvin, A. (2023). Why the 2020 Belarusian protests failed to oust Lukashenka. Nationalities Papers, 51(4), 787–802. doi:10.1017/nps.2023.6

==== Central Asia and the Eurasian Economic Union ====
- Allison, R. (2008). Virtual regionalism, regional structures and regime security in Central Asia. Central Asian Survey, 27(2), 185–202. doi:10.1080/02634930802355121
- Allison, R. (2018). Protective integration and security policy coordination: Comparing the SCO and CSTO. The Chinese Journal of International Politics, 11(3), 297–338. doi:10.1093/cjip/poy008
- Bakumbayev, B. (2025). Small state as order-maker: The case of Kazakhstan's Eurasian Union project. Post-Soviet Affairs, 41(3), 219–241. doi:10.1080/1060586x.2025.2486892
- Cooley, A. (2012). Great games, local rules: The new great power contest in Central Asia. Oxford University Press. doi:10.1093/acprof:oso/9780199929825.001.0001
- Cooley, A. A., & Heathershaw, J. (2017). Dictators without borders: Power and money in Central Asia. Yale University Press. doi:10.12987/9780300222098
- Dragneva, R., & Wolczuk, K. (Eds.). (2013). Eurasian economic integration. Edward Elgar. doi:10.4337/9781782544760
- Kazharski, A. (2019). Eurasian integration and the Russian world: Regionalism as an identitary enterprise. Central European University Press. doi:10.1515/9789633862865
- Libman, A. (2022). Does integration rhetoric help? Eurasian regionalism and the rhetorical dissonance of Russian elites. Europe-Asia Studies, 74(9), 1574–1595. doi:10.1080/09668136.2022.2120184
- Libman, A., & Davidzon, I. (2023). Military intervention as a spectacle? Authoritarian regionalism and protests in Kazakhstan. International Affairs, 99(3), 1293–1312. doi:10.1093/ia/iiad093
- Libman, A., & Obydenkova, A. V. (2018). Regional international organizations as a strategy of autocracy: The Eurasian Economic Union and Russian foreign policy. International Affairs, 94(5), 1037–1058. doi:10.1093/ia/iiy147
- Nitoiu, C. (2017). European and Eurasian integration: Competition and cooperation in the post-Soviet space. Journal of European Integration, 39(4), 469–475. doi:10.1080/07036337.2017.1317989
- Obydenkova, A. V., & Libman, A. (2019). Authoritarian regionalism in the world of international organizations: Global perspectives and the Eurasian enigma. Oxford University Press. doi:10.1093/oso/9780198839040.001.0001
- Roberts, S. P., & Moshes, A. (2016). The Eurasian Economic Union: A case of reproductive integration? Post-Soviet Affairs, 32(6), 542–565. doi:10.1080/1060586x.2015.1115198

==== Georgia ====
- Allison, R. (2008). Russia resurgent? Moscow's campaign to 'coerce Georgia to peace'. International Affairs, 84(6), 1145–1171. doi:10.1111/j.1468-2346.2008.00762.x
- Asmus, R. D. (2010). A little war that shook the world: Georgia, Russia, and the future of the West. Palgrave Macmillan.
- Cheterian, V. (2009). The August 2008 war in Georgia: From ethnic conflict to border wars. Central Asian Survey, 28(2), 155–170. doi:10.1080/02634930903056768
- Cornell, S. E., & Starr, S. F. (Eds.). (2009). The guns of August 2008: Russia's war in Georgia. M. E. Sharpe.
- George, J. A. (2009). The politics of ethnic separatism in Russia and Georgia. Palgrave Macmillan. doi:10.1057/9780230102323
- German, T. (2016). Russia and South Ossetia: Conferring statehood or creeping annexation? Southeast European and Black Sea Studies, 16(1), 155–167. doi:10.1080/14683857.2016.1148411
- Gerrits, A. W. M., & Bader, M. (2016). Russian patronage over Abkhazia and South Ossetia: Implications for conflict resolution. East European Politics, 32(3), 297–313. doi:10.1080/21599165.2016.1166104
- Jones, S. F. (Ed.). (2014). The making of modern Georgia, 1918–2012: The first Georgian republic and its successors. Routledge. doi:10.4324/9781315818207
- O'Loughlin, J., Kolossov, V., & Toal, G. (2014). Inside the post-Soviet de facto states: A comparison of attitudes in Abkhazia, Nagorny Karabakh, South Ossetia, and Transnistria. Eurasian Geography and Economics, 55(5), 423–456. doi:10.1080/15387216.2015.1012644
- Souleimanov, E. (2013). Understanding ethnopolitical conflict: Karabakh, South Ossetia, and Abkhazia wars reconsidered. Palgrave Macmillan.
- Wheatley, J. (2005). Georgia from national awakening to Rose Revolution: Delayed transition in the former Soviet Union. Ashgate.

==== Ukraine ====
- Allison, R. (2014). Russian "deniable" intervention in Ukraine: How and why Russia broke the rules. International Affairs, 90(6), 1255–1297. doi:10.1111/1468-2346.12170
- Charap, S., & Colton, T. J. (2018). Everyone loses: The Ukraine crisis and the ruinous contest for post-Soviet Eurasia. Routledge. doi:10.4324/9780429031571
- D'Anieri, P. (2019). Ukraine and Russia: From civilized divorce to uncivil war. Cambridge University Press. doi:10.1017/9781108657044
- Dragneva, R., & Wolczuk, K. (2015). Ukraine between the EU and Russia: The integration challenge. Palgrave Macmillan. doi:10.1057/9781137516268
- Freedman, L. (2019). Ukraine and the art of strategy. Oxford University Press.
- Giuliano, E. (2018). Who supported separatism in Donbas? Ethnicity and popular opinion at the start of the Ukraine crisis. Post-Soviet Affairs, 34(2–3), 158–178. doi:10.1080/1060586x.2018.1447769
- Malyarenko, T., & Wolff, S. (2018). The logic of competitive influence-seeking: Russia, Ukraine, and the conflict in Donbas. Post-Soviet Affairs, 34(4), 191–212. doi:10.1080/1060586x.2018.1425083
- Marples, D. R., & Mills, F. V. (Eds.). (2015). Ukraine's Euromaidan: Analyses of a civil revolution. ibidem-Verlag.
- Marten, K. (2015). Putin's choices: Explaining Russian foreign policy and intervention in Ukraine. The Washington Quarterly, 38(2), 189–204. doi:10.1080/0163660x.2015.1064717
- Menon, R., & Rumer, E. (2015). Conflict in Ukraine: The unwinding of the post-Cold War order. MIT Press.
- Onuch, O., & Hale, H. E. (2022). The Zelensky effect. Hurst. doi:10.14375/np.9781787389922
- Person, R., & McFaul, M. (2022). What Putin fears most. Journal of Democracy, 33(2), 18–27. doi:10.1353/jod.2022.0015
- Plokhy, S. (2015). The gates of Europe: A history of Ukraine. Basic Books.
- Plokhy, S. (2023). The Russo-Ukrainian war: The return of history. W. W. Norton.
- Sakwa, R. (2015). Frontline Ukraine: Crisis in the borderlands. I.B. Tauris. doi:10.5040/9780755603756
- Wilson, A. (2014). Ukraine crisis: What it means for the West. Yale University Press.
- Wood, E. A., Pomeranz, W. E., Merry, E. W., & Trudolyubov, M. (2015). Roots of Russia's war in Ukraine. Columbia University Press. doi:10.7312/wood70453
- Wynnyckyj, M. (2019). Ukraine's Maidan, Russia's war: A chronicle and analysis of the Revolution of Dignity. ibidem-Verlag.
- Zhukov, Y. M. (2016). Trading hard hats for combat helmets: The economics of rebellion in eastern Ukraine. Journal of Comparative Economics, 44(1), 1–15. doi:10.1016/j.jce.2015.10.010

== Biographies ==
=== Boris Yeltsin ===
- Aron, L. (2000). Boris Yeltsin: A revolutionary life. HarperCollins.
- Breslauer, G. W. (2002). Gorbachev and Yeltsin as leaders. Cambridge University Press. doi:10.1017/cbo9780511613531
- Colton, T. J. (2008). Yeltsin: A life. Basic Books.
- Ellison, H. J. (2006). Boris Yeltsin and Russia's democratic transformation. University of Washington Press.

==== Works by Boris Yeltsin ====
- Yeltsin, B. (1990). Against the grain: An autobiography (M. Glenny, Trans.). Simon & Schuster.
- Yeltsin, B. (1994). The struggle for Russia. Times Books.

== Historiography, identity and memory studies ==
- Koposov, N. (2018). Memory laws, memory wars: The politics of the past in Europe and Russia. Cambridge University Press. doi:10.1017/9781108304047
- Malinova, O. (2018). The embarrassing centenary: Reinterpretation of the 1917 Revolution in the official historical narrative of post-Soviet Russia (1991–2017). Nationalities Papers, 46(2), 272–289. doi:10.1080/00905992.2017.1386639
- Miller, A., & Lipman, M. (Eds.). (2012). The convolutions of historical politics. Central European University Press. doi:10.1515/9786155225468
- Mogilner, M. (2014). New imperial history: Post-Soviet historiography in search of a new paradigm for the history of empire and nationalism. Revue d'études Comparatives Est-Ouest, 45(2), 25–67.
- Sherlock, T. (2007). Historical narratives in the Soviet Union and post-Soviet Russia: Destroying the settled past, creating an uncertain future. Palgrave Macmillan. doi:10.1057/9780230604216
- Sherlock, T. (2016). Russian politics and the Soviet past: Reassessing Stalin and Stalinism under Vladimir Putin. Communist and Post-Communist Studies, 49(1), 45–59. doi:10.1016/j.postcomstud.2016.01.001
- Siegelbaum, L. H. (2012). Whither Soviet history?: Some reflections on recent Anglophone historiography. Region, 1(2), 213–230.
- Tsygankov, A. P. (2009). Russophobia: Anti-Russian lobby and American foreign policy. Palgrave Macmillan.
- Weiss-Wendt, A., & Adler, N. (Eds.). (2021). The future of the Soviet past: The politics of history in Putin's Russia. Indiana University Press.

=== Memory studies ===
- Adler, N. (2005). The future of the Soviet past remains unpredictable: The resurrection of Stalinist symbols amidst the exhumation of mass graves. Europe-Asia Studies, 57(8), 1093–1119.
- Etkind, A. (2013). Warped mourning: Stories of the undead in the land of the unburied. Stanford University Press. doi:10.1515/9780804785532
- Hicks, J. (2020). The Victory Banner over the Reichstag: Film, document, and ritual in Russia's contested memory of World War II (Russian and East European Studies). University of Pittsburgh Press.
- McGlynn, J. (2023). Memory makers: The politics of the past in Putin's Russia. Bloomsbury Academic. doi:10.5040/9781350280793
- Smith, T. J. (1998). The collapse of the Lenin personality cult in Soviet Russia, 1985–1995. The Historian, 60(2), 325–343.
- Wood, E. A. (2011). Performing memory: Vladimir Putin and the celebration of World War II in Russia. The Soviet and Post-Soviet Review, 38(2), 172–200. doi:10.1163/187633211x591175

== Other studies ==
- Erley, M. (2021). On Russian soil: Myth and materiality. Northern Illinois University Press.
- Hartley, J. M. (2021). The Volga: A history. Yale University Press.

== Reference works ==
Below are reference works related to the history of Russia for background and context.

- Kievan Rus. (2016). Encyclopedia Britannica.
- Auty, R., Obolensky, D., et al. (2010). Companion to Russian studies (Vol. 1, An introduction to Russian history; Vol. 2, Russian language and literature; Vol. 3, An introduction to Russian art and architecture). Cambridge University Press.
- Barnes, I., & Lieven, D. (2015). Restless empire: A historical atlas of Russia (Illustrated ed.). Belknap Press.
- Brown, A., et al. (1982). The Cambridge encyclopedia of Russia and the Soviet Union. Cambridge University Press.
- Channon, J., & Hudson, R. (1995). The Penguin historical atlas of Russia. Penguin.
- Gilbert, M. (2007). The Routledge atlas of Russian history (4th ed.). Routledge.
- Katchanovski, I., Kohut, Z. E., Nebesio, B. Y., & Yurkevich, M. (2013). Historical dictionary of Ukraine (2nd ed.). Scarecrow Press.
- Langer, L. N. (2001). Historical dictionary of medieval Russia. The Scarecrow Press.
- Lerski, H. (1996). Historical dictionary of Poland, 966–1945. Greenwood Publishing.
- Magocsi, P. R. (2017). Carpathian Rus': A historical atlas. University of Toronto Press.
- Millar, J. R. (Ed.). (2004). Encyclopedia of Russian history (4 vols.). Macmillan Library Reference.
- Wieczynski, J. L., et al. (Eds.). (1976–). The modern encyclopedia of Russian and Soviet history. Academic International Press.

== See also ==
- Bibliography of the history of the Early Slavs and Rus'
- Bibliography of Russian history (1223–1613)
- Bibliography of Russian history (1613–1917)
- Bibliography of the Russo-Japanese War
- Bibliography of Russia during World War I
- Bibliography of the Russian Revolution and Civil War
- Bibliography of Stalinism and the Soviet Union
- Bibliography of the Soviet Union during World War II
- Bibliography of the Post Stalinist Soviet Union
- Bibliography of Ukrainian history
- Bibliography of the history of Belarus and Byelorussia
- Bibliography of the history of Poland
