= The Origins of the Slavic Nations =

Book about the origins of east Slavic nations

The Origins of the Slavic Nations: Premodern Identities in Russia, Ukraine, and Belarus
- Author: Serhii Plokhy
- Language: English
- Subject: History of Russia, History of Ukraine, History of Belarus
- Genre: History, non-fiction
- Publisher: Cambridge University Press
- Publication date: 2006
- Pages: 400 (first edition, hardback)
- ISBN: 978-0521864039

The Origins of the Slavic Nations: Premodern Identities in Russia, Ukraine, and Belarus is a work by Serhii Plokhy and was published by Cambridge University Press in 2006. The book examines the origins of the east Slavic family of nations, Russia, Ukraine, and Belarus, and explores how their early development and complex relationship impacted their history and identities.

== Academic journal reviews ==
- Boeck, B. J. (2009). "Review: The Origins of the Slavic Nations: Premodern Identities in Russia, Ukraine, and Belarus, by Serhii Plokhy". The Journal of Interdisciplinary History. 39 (4). [The MIT Press, Massachusetts Institute of Technology and the editors of The Journal of Interdisciplinary History]: 587–588. ISSN 0022-1953.
- Bushkovitch, P. (2007). "Review: The Origins of the Slavic Nations: Premodern Identities in Russia, Ukraine, and Belarus". The International History Review. 29 (4). Taylor & Francis: 846–848. ISSN 0707-5332.
- Drozd, A. M. (2008). "Review: The Origins of the Slavic Nations: Premodern Identities in Russia, Ukraine, and Belarus". The Slavic and East European Journal. 52 (2). American Association of Teachers of Slavic and East European Languages: 326–327. ISSN 0037-6752.
- Frick, D. (2007). "Review: The Origins of the Slavic Nations: Premodern Identities in Russia, Ukraine, and Belarus". The Russian Review. 66 (2). Wiley: 329–331. ISSN 0036-0341.
- Greene, R. H. (2009). "Review: Serhii Plokhy, The Origins of the Slavic Nations: Premodern Identities in Russia, Ukraine, and Belarus". Journal of World History. 20 (3). University of Hawai’i Press: 451–453. ISSN 1045-6007.
- Halperin, C. J. (2010). "Review: Serhii Plokhy, The Origins of the Slavic Nations: Premodern Identities in Russia, Ukraine, and Belarus". Russian History. 37 (3). Brill: 275–294. ISSN 0094-288X.
- Kaiser, D. H. (2007). "Review: The Origins of the Slavic Nations: Premodern Identities in Russia, Ukraine, and Belarus". Slavic Review. 66 (4). Association for Slavic, East European, and Eurasian Studies: 749–750. doi:10.2307/20060402. ISSN 0037-6779.
- Lavrov, A. (2009). "Review: Serhii Plokhy, The Origins of the Slavic Nations: Premodern Identities in Russia, Ukraine, and Belarus". Annales. Histoire, Sciences Sociales. 64 (3). Cambridge University Press: 709–711. ISSN 0395-2649.
- Ostrowski, D. (2008). "Review: The Origins of the Slavic Nations: Premodern Identities in Russia, Ukraine, and Belarus". Canadian Slavonic Papers / Revue Canadienne des Slavistes. 50 (3/4). Taylor & Francis, Ltd.: 521–522. ISSN 0008-5006.
- Raffensperger, C. (2007). "Review: The Origins of the Slavic Nations: Premodern Identities in Russia, Ukraine, and Belarus". Social History. 32 (4). Taylor & Francis: 480–482. ISSN 0307-1022.
- Werdt, C. (2008). "Review: Serhii Plokhy, The Origins of the Slavic Nations: Premodern Identities in Russia, Ukraine, and Belarus". Jahrbücher für Geschichte Osteuropas. 56 (4). Franz Steiner Verlag: 585–586. ISSN 0021-4019.
- Yekelchyk, S. (2008). "Review: Serhii Plokhy, The Origins of the Slavic Nations: Premodern Identities in Russia, Ukraine, and Belarus". The Journal of Modern History. 80 (4). The University of Chicago Press: 965–966. doi:10.1086/596699. ISSN 0022-2801.

== See also ==
- Bibliography of the history of the Early Slavs and Rus'
- The Making of the Slavs: History and Archaeology of the Lower Danube Region
