= Ukrainian historiography =

Ukrainian historiography is the scholarly study of Ukraine's history. It has been heavily influenced by Ukraine's history with Russia. In recent years, it has also been influenced by Ukrainian immigrant historians living in Canada.

== History ==
Knowledge about Ukraine in other parts of the world came chiefly from Russian secondary sources until relatively recently. After the second half of the seventeenth century, when Muscovy and later the Russian Empire came to control much of Ukrainian territory, Russian writers included Ukraine as part of Russian history. This included referring to medieval Kyivan Rus as "Kievan Russia" and its Old East Slavic culture and inhabitants as "Kievan Russian" or "Old Russian". Later Ukraine or its parts were called "Little Russia", "South Russia", "West Russia" (with Belarus), or "New Russia" (the Black Sea coast and southeastern steppe). But parts of Ukraine beyond Russia's reach were called Ruthenia and its people Ruthenians. The names chosen to refer to Ukraine and Ukrainians have often reflected a certain political position, and sometimes even to deny the existence of Ukrainian nationality. The Russian point-of-view of Ukrainian history became the prevailing one in Western academia, and although the bias was identified as early as the 1950s, many scholars of Slavic studies and history believe significant changes are still necessary to correct the Moscow-centric view.

The scholarly study of Ukraine's history emerged from romantic impulses in the late 19th century when German Romanticism spread to Eastern Europe. The outstanding leaders were Volodymyr Antonovych (1834–1908), based in Kyiv, and his student Mykhailo Hrushevsky (1866–1934). The first serious challenge to the Russian view of Ukraine was Hrushevsky's 1904 article "The Traditional Scheme of 'Russian' History and the Problem of the Rational organization of the History of the Eastern Slavs". For the first time full-scale scholarly studies based on archival sources, modern research techniques, and modern historical theories became possible. However, the demands of government officials—Tsarist, to a lesser degree Austro-Hungarian and Polish, and later Soviet—made it difficult to disseminate ideas that ran counter to the central government. Therefore, exile schools of historians emerged in central Europe and Canada after 1920.

Strikingly different interpretations of the medieval state of Kyivan Rus appear in the four schools of historiography within Ukraine: Russophile, Sovietophile, Eastern Slavic, and Ukrainophile. In the Soviet Union, there was a radical break after 1921, led by Mikhail Pokrovsky. Until 1934, history was generally not regarded as chauvinistic, but was rewritten in the style of Marxist historiography. National "pasts" were rewritten as social and national liberation for non-Russians, and social liberation for Russians, in a process that ended in 1917. Under Stalin, the state and its official historiography were given a distinct Russian character and a certain Russocentrism. Imperial history was rewritten such that non-Russian love caused an emulation and deference to "join" the Russian people by becoming part of the (tsarist) Russian state, and in return, Russian state interests were driven by altruism and concern for neighboring people. Russophile and Sovietophile schools have become marginalized in independent Ukraine, with the Ukrainophile school being dominant in the early 21st century. The Ukrainophile school promotes an identity that is mutually exclusive of Russia. It has come to dominate the nation's educational system, security forces, and national symbols and monuments, although it has been dismissed as nationalist by Western historians. The East Slavic school, an eclectic compromise between Ukrainophiles and Russophilism, has a weaker ideological and symbolic base, although it is preferred by Ukraine's centrist former elites.

Many historians in recent years have sought alternatives to national histories, and Ukrainian history invited approaches that looked beyond a national paradigm. Multiethnic history recognises the numerous peoples in Ukraine; transnational history portrays Ukraine as a border zone for various empires; and area studies categorises Ukraine as part of East-Central Europe or, less often, as part of Eurasia. Serhii Plokhy argues that looking beyond the country's national history has made possible a richer understanding of Ukraine, its people, and the surrounding regions. since 2015, there has been renewed interest in integrating a "territorial-civic" and "linguistic-ethnic" history of Ukraine. For example, the history of the Crimean Tatars and the more distant history of the Crimea peninsula is now integrated into Ukrainian school history. This is part of the constitutionally mandated "people of Ukraine" rather than "Ukrainian people". Slowly, the histories of Poles and Jews are also being reintegrated. However, due to the current political climate caused by territorial sovereignty breaches by Russia, the role of Russians as "co-host" has been greatly minimized, and there are still unresolved difficult issues of the past, for example, the role of Ukrainians during the Holodomor.

After 1991, historical memory was a powerful tool in the political mobilization and legitimation of the post-Soviet Ukrainian state, as well as the division of selectively used memory along the lines of the political division of Ukrainian society. Ukraine did not experience the restorationist paradigm typical of some other post-Soviet nations, for example the three Baltic countries —Lithuania, Latvia, and Estonia, although the multifaceted history of independence, the Orthodox Church in Ukraine, Soviet-era repressions, mass famine, and World War II collaboration were used to provide a different constitutive frame for developing Ukrainian nationhood. The politics of identity (which includes the production of history textbooks and the authorization of commemorative practices) has remained fragmented and tailored to reflect the ideological anxieties and concerns of individual regions of Ukraine.

== Canadian historiography on Ukraine ==
In Soviet Ukraine, twentieth-century historians were strictly limited in the range of models and topics they could cover, with Moscow insisting on an official Marxist approach. However, émigré Ukrainians in Canada developed an independent scholarship that ignored Marxism, and shared the Western tendencies in historiography. George W. Simpson and Orest Subtelny were leaders promoting Ukrainian studies in Canadian academe. The lack of independence in Ukraine meant that traditional historiographical emphases on diplomacy and politics were handicapped. The flourishing of social history after 1960 opened many new approaches for researchers in Canada; Subtelny used the modernization model. Later historiographical trends were quickly adapted to the Ukrainian evidence, with special focus on Ukrainian nationalism. The new cultural history, post-colonial studies, and the "linguistic turn" augmenting, if not replacing social history, allowed for multiple angles of approach. By 1991, historians in Canada had freely explored a wide range of approaches regarding the emergence of a national identity. After independence, a high priority in Canada was assisting in the freeing of Ukrainian scholarship from Soviet-Marxist orthodoxy—which downplayed Ukrainian nationalism and insisted that true Ukrainians were always trying to reunite with Russia. Independence from Moscow meant freedom from an orthodoxy that was never well suited to Ukrainian developments. Scholars in Ukraine welcomed the "national paradigm" that Canadian historians had helped develop. Since 1991, the study of Ukrainian nation-building became an increasingly global and collaborative enterprise, with scholars from Ukraine studying and working in Canada, and with conferences on related topics attracting scholars from around the world.

== See also ==
- Outline of Ukrainian history
- Ukrainian National Revival
- Ukrainian nationalism
- Ukrainophilia
- Russophilia
- All-Russian nation
- Pan-Slavism
