= Bibliography of Russian history (1223–1613) =

This is a select bibliography of post World War II English language books (including translations) and journal articles about the history of Russia and its borderlands from the Mongol invasions until 1613. The sections "General Surveys" and "Biographies" contain books; other sections contain both books and journal articles.

Works listed here are cited in the notes or bibliographies of scholarly sources. Each is published by an academic or major press, written by a recognized expert, or substantially reviewed in scholarly journals; borderline cases are omitted. A selection of primary sources are included. Many of the books below carry their own bibliographies; see the Further reading section for other bibliographies, and the External links section for historical sites, academic sites, and museums.

Citations follow APA style. (Note: Entries are in plain text APA 7 format without templates; templates are used only for reviews and notes.) Book have citations to academic journal or mainstream published reviews when available. For books only partly about the subject, relevant chapter or section titles are provided when useful and available. Translators of the original-language edition are included when possible. In cases where a title or name has appeared with more than one English spelling, the most recent published form is used and a footnote documents any earlier title under which the work appeared.

== General works ==
General works on Russian history which have significant context for Russian history in general or content about this bibliography's timeframe of history.

- Acton, E. (1995). Russia: The tsarist and Soviet legacy (2nd ed.). Longman.
- Ascher, A. (2017). Russia: A short history (3rd rev. ed.). Oneworld Publications.
- Auty, R., & Obolensky, D. D. (Eds.). (1976–1981). Companion to Russian studies (3 vols.). Cambridge University Press.
- Bartlett, R. P. (2005). A history of Russia (Macmillan Essential Histories). Palgrave Macmillan.
- Billington, J. H. (1966). The icon and the axe: An interpretive history of Russian culture. Alfred A. Knopf.
- Blackwell, W. L. (1994). The industrialization of Russia: A historical perspective (3rd ed.). Harlan Davidson.
- Blum, J. (1961). Lord and peasant in Russia from the ninth to the nineteenth century. Princeton University Press.
- Bogatyrev, S. (Ed.). (2004). Russia takes shape: Patterns of integration from the Middle Ages to the present. Finnish Academy of Science and Letters.
- Borrero, M. (2004). Russia: A reference guide from the Renaissance to the present. Facts on File.
- Boterbloem, K. (2018). A history of Russia and its empire: From Mikhail Romanov to Vladimir Putin (2nd ed.). Rowman & Littlefield.
- Boterbloem, K. (2020). Russia as empire: Past and present. Reaktion Books.
- Breyfogle, N., Schrader, A., & Sunderland, W. (Eds.). (2007). Peopling the Russian periphery: Borderland colonization in Eurasian history. Routledge.
- Bushkovitch, P. (2011). A concise history of Russia. Cambridge University Press.
- Chatterjee, C. (2022). Russia in world history: A transnational approach. Bloomsbury Academic.
- Cherniavsky, M. (Ed.). (1970). The structure of Russian history: Interpretive essays. Random House.
- Christian, D. (1998–2018). A history of Russia, Central Asia and Mongolia (2 vols.). Blackwell; Wiley-Blackwell.
- Clarkson, J. D. (1969). A history of Russia (2nd ed.). Random House.
- Connolly, R. (2020). The Russian economy: A very short introduction. Oxford University Press.
- Dmytryshyn, B. (Ed.). (1991). Medieval Russia: A source book, 850–1700 (3rd ed.). Holt, Rinehart and Winston.
- Dmytryshyn, B. (1977). A history of Russia. Prentice-Hall.
- Dukes, P. (1998). A history of Russia: Medieval, modern, contemporary, c. 882–1996 (3rd ed.). Duke University Press.
- Evtuhov, C., Goldfrank, D., Hughes, L., & Stites, R. (2004). A history of Russia: Peoples, legends, events, forces. Houghton Mifflin.
- Figes, O. (2022). The story of Russia. Metropolitan Books.
- Forsyth, J. (1992). A history of the peoples of Siberia: Russia's North Asian colony 1581–1990. Cambridge University Press.
- Freeze, G. L. (Ed.). (2009). Russia: A history (3rd ed.). Oxford University Press.
- Gleason, A. (Ed.). (2009). A companion to Russian history (Wiley-Blackwell Companions to World History). Wiley-Blackwell.
- Grousset, R. (1970). The empire of the steppes: A history of Central Asia (N. Walford, Trans. (Note: Original-language edition: Grousset, R. (1939). L'empire des steppes: Attila, Gengis-Khan, Tamerlan. Payot. Walford's translation was made from the revised 1952 French edition.)). Rutgers University Press.
- Hosking, G. (1997). Russia: People and empire, 1552–1917. Harvard University Press.
- Hosking, G. (2001). Russia and the Russians: A history. Harvard University Press.
- Kochan, L., & Abraham, R. (1983). The making of modern Russia (2nd ed.). Penguin Books.
- Lieven, D. (2000). Empire: The Russian empire and its rivals. John Murray.
- Lieven, D., Perrie, M., & Suny, R. (Eds.). (2006). The Cambridge history of Russia (3 vols.). Cambridge University Press. (Note: The Cambridge History of Russia: Volume 1, From early Rus' to 1689; Volume 2, Imperial Russia, 1689–1917; Volume 3, The twentieth century.)
- Longworth, P. (2005). Russia: The once and future empire from pre-history to Putin. St. Martin's Press.
- Mazour, A. G. (1962). Russia: Tsarist and communist. Van Nostrand.
- Moss, W. G. (1997–2005). A history of Russia (2 vols.; 2nd ed., 2003–2005). Anthem Press.
- Pares, B. (1953). A history of Russia (definitive ed.). Alfred A. Knopf.
- Pipes, R. (1974). Russia under the old regime. Charles Scribner's Sons.
- Poe, M. T. (2003). The Russian moment in world history. Princeton University Press.
- Riasanovsky, N. V., & Steinberg, M. D. (2025). A history of Russia (10th ed.). Oxford University Press.
- Shubin, D. H. (2005). A history of Russian Christianity (4 vols.). Algora Publishing.
- Sumner, B. H. (1943). A short history of Russia. Reynal & Hitchcock.
- Vernadsky, G. (1943–1969). A history of Russia (5 vols.). Yale University Press. (Note: Vernadsky's five volumes are as follows: Vol. 1: Ancient Russia (1943); Vol. 2: Kievan Russia (1948); Vol. 3: The Mongols and Russia (1953); Vol. 4: Russia at the dawn of the modern age (1959); Vol. 5: The tsardom of Moscow, 1547–1682 (2 parts, 1969).)
- Vernadsky, G. (1961). A history of Russia (6th rev. ed.). Yale University Press.
- Ward, C. J., & Thompson, J. M. (2021). Russia: A historical introduction from Kievan Rus' to the present (9th ed.). Routledge.
- Wren, M. C., & Stults, T. (2009). The course of Russian history (5th ed.). Waveland Press.

== Period works (1223–1613) ==
- Alef, G. (1983). Rulers and nobles in 15th-century Muscovy. Variorum.
- Birnbaum, H., Flier, M. S., & Rowland, D. B. (1984). Medieval Russian culture. University of California Press.
- Black, J. (1999). The development of Russian military power, 1453–1815. In J. Black (Ed.), European warfare, 1453–1815. Macmillan.
- Lohr, E., & Poe, M. (Eds.). (2002). The military and society in Russia, 1450–1917. Brill.
- Martin, J. (2007). Medieval Russia, 980–1584. Cambridge University Press.
- Meyendorff, J. (1997). Byzantium and the rise of Russia: A study of Byzantino-Russian relations in the fourteenth century. St Vladimir's Seminary Press.
- Ostrowski, D., & Poe, M. T. (Eds.). (2011). Portraits of old Russia: Imagined lives of ordinary people, 1300–1745. Routledge.
- Pelenski, J. (1998). The contest for the legacy of Kievan Rus'. East European Monographs, Columbia University.
- Presniakov, A. E. (1970). The formation of the great Russian state: A study of Russian history in the thirteenth to fifteenth centuries (A. E. Moorhouse, Trans.). Quadrangle Books.

=== Mongols ===
- Allsen, T. (1981). Mongol census taking in Rus', 1245–1275. Harvard Ukrainian Studies, 5(1), 32–53.
- Allsen, T. (2001). Culture and conquest in Mongol Eurasia. Cambridge University Press.
- Fennell, J. (1983, 2014, 2017). The crisis of medieval Russia, 1200–1304. Routledge.
- Halperin, C. (1987). Russia and the Golden Horde: The Mongol impact on medieval Russian history. Indiana University Press.
- Inalcik, H. (1979). The khan and the tribal aristocracy: The Crimean Khanate under Sahib Giray I. Harvard Ukrainian Studies, 3/4, 445–466.
- Langer, L. (2017). Rus' and the Mongol decimal system. Russian History, 44(4), 515–533.
- Martin, J. (1992). Muscovite frontier policy: The case of the Khanate of Kasimov. Russian History, 19(1/4), 169–179.
- Morgan, D. (1986). The Mongols. Blackwell.
- Ostrowski, D. (1990). The Mongol origins of Muscovite political institutions. Slavic Review, 49(4), 525–542.
- Pritsak, O. (1967). Moscow, the Golden Horde, and the Kazan Khanate from a polycultural point of view. Slavic Review, 26(4), 577–583.
- Sverdrup, C. F. (2020). The Mongol conquests: The military operations of Genghis Khan and Sube'etei. Helion.
- Vernadsky, G. (1973). The Mongols and Russia (A history of Russia, Vol. 3). Yale University Press.
- Zdan, M. B. (1957). The dependence of Halych-Volyn' Rus' on the Golden Horde. The Slavonic and East European Review, 35(85), 505–522.

=== Muscovite ===
- Alef, G. (1966). The adoption of the Muscovite two-headed eagle: A discordant view. Speculum, 41(1), 1–21.
- Alef, G. (1983). Rulers and nobles in 15th-century Muscovy. Ashgate Publishing.
- Alef, G. (1986). The origins of Muscovite autocracy: The age of Ivan III. Osteuropa-Institut.
- Brown, P. (1983). Muscovite government bureaus. Russian History, 10(3), 269–330.
- Brown, P. (2009). How Muscovy governed: Seventeenth-century Russian central administration. Russian History, 36(4), 459–529.
- Backus, O. P. (1957). Motives of West Russian nobles in deserting Lithuania for Moscow, 1377–1514. University of Kansas Press.
- Croskey, R. M. (1987). Muscovite diplomatic practice in the reign of Ivan III. Garland.
- Crummey, R. O. (1987). The formation of Muscovy, 1304–1613. Routledge.
- Crummey, R. (1987). New wine in old bottles? Ivan IV and Novgorod. Russian History, 14(1/4), 61–76.
- Davies, B. (1987). The town governors in the reign of Ivan IV. Russian History, 14(1/4), 77–143.
- Fennell, J. (1968). The emergence of Moscow, 1304–1359. Secker & Warburg.
- Halperin, C. (2012). Simeon Bekbulatovich and Mongol influence on Ivan IV's Muscovy. Russian History, 39(3), 306–330.
- Halperin, C. J. (2000). Muscovite political institutions in the 14th century. Kritika: Explorations in Russian and Eurasian History, 1(2), 237–257.
- Halperin, C. J. (2002). Muscovy as a hypertrophic state: A critique. Kritika: Explorations in Russian and Eurasian History, 3(3), 501–507.
- Keenan, E. (1967). Muscovy and Kazan: Some introductory remarks on the patterns of steppe diplomacy. Slavic Review, 26(4), 548–558.
- Keenan, E. (1986). Muscovite political folkways. The Russian Review, 45(2), 115–181.
- Kivelson, V. (2002). Muscovite "citizenship": Rights without freedom. The Journal of Modern History, 74(3), 465–489.
- Kollmann, N. S. (1986a). Consensus politics: The dynastic crisis of the 1490s reconsidered. Russian Review, 45(3), 235–267.
- Kollmann, N. S. (1986b). Ritual and social drama at the Muscovite court. Slavic Review, 45(3), 486–502.
- Kollmann, N. S. (1987). Kinship and politics: The making of the Muscovite political system, 1345–1547. Stanford University Press.
- Kotilaine, J., & Poe, M. (Eds.). (2004). Modernizing Muscovy: Reform and social change in seventeenth-century Russia. Routledge.
- Martin, J. (1992). Muscovite frontier policy: The case of the Khanate of Kasimov. Russian History, 19(1/4), 169–179.
- Ostrowski, D. (1990). The Mongol origins of Muscovite political institutions. Slavic Review, 49(4), 525–542.
- Ostrowski, D. (1998). Muscovy and the Mongols: Cross-cultural influences on the steppe frontier, 1304–1589. Cambridge University Press.
- Pelenski, J. (1967). Muscovite imperial claims to the Kazan Khanate. Slavic Review, 26(4), 559–576.
- Pelenski, J. (1979). The sack of Kiev of 1482 in contemporary Muscovite chronicle writing. Harvard Ukrainian Studies, 3/4, 638–649.
- Pelenski, J. (1983). The emergence of the Muscovite claims to the Byzantine-Kievan "imperial inheritance". Harvard Ukrainian Studies, 7, 520–531.
- Raba, J. (1976). The authority of the Muscovite ruler at the dawn of the modern era. Jahrbücher für Geschichte Osteuropas, 24(3), Neue Folge, 321–344.

=== Tsardom of Russia ===
- Bogatyrev, S. (2007). Reinventing the Russian monarchy in the 1550s: Ivan the Terrible, the dynasty, and the church. The Slavonic and East European Review, 85(2), 271–293.
- Bushkovitch, P. (2014). The testament of Ivan the Terrible. Kritika: Explorations in Russian and Eurasian History, 15(3), 653–656.
- Bushkovitch, P. (2021). Succession to the throne in early modern Russia: The transfer of power, 1450–1725. Cambridge University Press.
- Fennell, J. (1987). Ivan IV as a writer. Russian History, 14(1/4), 145–154.
- Grobovsky, A. N. (1969). The "chosen council" of Ivan IV: A reinterpretation. T. Gaus' Sons.
- Halperin, C. (2003). Ivan IV and Chinggis Khan. Jahrbücher für Geschichte Osteuropas, 51(4), Neue Folge, 481–497.
- Halperin, C. (2007). Ivan IV's insanity. Russian History, 34(1/4), 207–218.
- Hellie, R. (1987). What happened? How did he get away with it? Ivan Groznyi's paranoia and the problem of institutional restraints. Russian History, 14(1/4), 199–224.
- Hunt, P. (1993). Ivan IV's personal mythology of kingship. Slavic Review, 52(4), 769–809.
- Khodarkovsky, M. (1999). Of Christianity, enlightenment, and colonialism: Russia in the North Caucasus, 1500–1800. The Journal of Modern History, 71(2), 394–430.
- Kleimola, A. (1987). Ivan the Terrible and his "go-fers": Aspects of state security in the 1560s. Russian History, 14(1/4), 283–292.
- Miller, D. (1967). The coronation of Ivan IV of Moscow. Jahrbücher für Geschichte Osteuropas, 15(4), Neue Folge, 559–574.
- Miller, D. (1994). Creating legitimacy: Ritual, ideology, and power in sixteenth-century Russia. Russian History, 21(3), 289–315.
- Perrie, M. (1987). The image of Ivan the Terrible in Russian folklore. Cambridge University Press.
- Pouncy, C. (2006). Missed opportunities and the search for Ivan the Terrible. Kritika: Explorations in Russian and Eurasian History, 7(2), 309–328.
- Rowland, D. (1990). Did Muscovite literary ideology place limits on the power of the tsar (1540s–1660s)?. The Russian Review, 49(2), 125–155.
- Waugh, D. (1987). The unsolved problem of Tsar Ivan IV's library. Russian History, 14(1/4), 395–408.
- Yaşar, M. (2016). The North Caucasus between the Ottoman Empire and the Tsardom of Muscovy: The beginnings, 1552–1570. Iran & the Caucasus, 20(1), 105–125.

==== Time of Troubles ====
- Dunning, C. S. L. (1995). Crisis, conjuncture, and the causes of the Time of Troubles. Harvard Ukrainian Studies, 19, 97–119.
- Dunning, C. S. L. (2001). Russia's first civil war: The Time of Troubles and the founding of the Romanov dynasty. Penn State University Press.
- Dunning, C. S. L. (2003). Terror in the Time of Troubles. Kritika: Explorations in Russian and Eurasian History, 4(3), 491–513.
- Perrie, M. (1982). Popular socio-utopian legends in the Time of Troubles. The Slavonic and East European Review, 60(2), 221–243.
- Perrie, M. (1995). Pretenders and popular monarchism in early modern Russia: The false tsars of the Time of Troubles. Cambridge University Press.
- Platonov, S. F. (1970). The Time of Troubles: A historical study of the internal crisis and social struggle in sixteenth- and seventeenth-century Muscovy. University Press of Kansas.

== Topical works ==
=== Indigenous peoples and ethnic groups ===
- Kappeler, A., Kohut, Z. E., Sysyn, F. E., & von Hagen, M. (Eds.). (2003). Culture, nation, and identity: The Ukrainian-Russian encounter, 1600–1945. Canadian Institute of Ukrainian Studies Press.

=== Religion and philosophy ===
- Bogatyrev, S. (2007). Reinventing the Russian monarchy in the 1550s: Ivan the Terrible, the dynasty, and the church. The Slavonic and East European Review, 85(2), 271–293.
- Bremer, T. (2013). Cross and Kremlin: A brief history of the Orthodox Church in Russia (E. W. Gritsch, Trans.). Eerdmans.
- Bushkovitch, P. (1992). Religion and society in Russia: The sixteenth and seventeenth centuries. Oxford University Press.
- Challis, N., & Dewey, H. (1987). Basil the Blessed, holy fool of Moscow. Russian History, 14(1/4), 47–59.
- Clucas, L. (Ed.). (1988). The Byzantine legacy in Eastern Europe. East European Monographs.
- Franklin, S. (2002). Byzantium-Rus-Russia: Studies in the translation of Christian culture. Ashgate/Variorum.
- Gruber, I. (2012). Orthodox Russia in crisis: Church and nation in the Time of Troubles. Northern Illinois University Press.
- Gudziak, B. A. (2001). Crisis and reform: The Kyivan metropolitanate, the patriarchate of Constantinople, and the genesis of the Union of Brest (Harvard Series in Ukrainian Studies). Harvard Ukrainian Research Institute.
- Hunt, P. (1993). Ivan IV's personal mythology of kingship. Slavic Review, 52(4), 769–809.
- Ivanov, A. A. (2020). A spiritual revolution: The impact of reformation and enlightenment in Orthodox Russia. University of Wisconsin Press.
- Kaiser, D. H. (2006). Church control over marriage in seventeenth-century Russia. The Russian Review, 65(4), 567–585.
- Khodarkovsky, M. (1996). "Not by word alone": Missionary policies and religious conversion in early modern Russia. Comparative Studies in Society and History, 38(2), 267–293.
- Khodarkovsky, M., & Geraci, R. (Eds.). (2001). Of religion and empire: Missions, conversion, and tolerance in tsarist Russia. Cornell University Press.
- Kivelson, V. A., & Worobec, C. D. (Eds.). (2020). Witchcraft in Russia and Ukraine, 1000–1900: A sourcebook (NIU Series in Slavic, East European, and Eurasian Studies). Northern Illinois University Press.
- Meyendorff, P. (1991). Russia, ritual, and reform: The liturgical reforms of Nikon in the 17th century. St Vladimir's Seminary Press.
- Pliguzov, A. I. (2023). Documentary sources on the history of Rus´ metropolitanate: The fourteenth to the early sixteenth centuries (Harvard Series in Ukrainian Studies). Harvard Ukrainian Research Institute.
- Romaniello, M. (2007). Mission delayed: The Russian Orthodox Church after the conquest of Kazan. Church History, 76(3), 511–540.
- Rosenthal, B. G. (Ed.). (1997). The occult in Russian and Soviet culture. Cornell University Press.
- Shepard, J. (2017). The expansion of Orthodox Europe: Byzantium, the Balkans and Russia. Routledge.
- Shubin, D. H. (2005). A history of Russian Christianity (4 vols.). Agathon Press.
- Thyret, I. (2001). Between God and tsar: Religious symbolism and the royal women of Muscovite Russia. Northern Illinois University Press.
- Weickhardt, G. (2012). Muscovite law on monasteries. Russian History, 39(1/2), 13–41.

=== Other studies ===
- Hartley, J. M. (2021). The Volga: A history. Yale University Press.
- Koloda, V., & Gorbanenko, S. (2020). Agriculture in the forest-steppe region of Khazaria (East Central and Eastern Europe in the Middle Ages, 450–1450, Vol. 60). Brill.
- Rowland, D. B. (2020). God, tsar, and people: The political culture of early modern Russia (NIU Series in Slavic, East European, and Eurasian Studies). Cornell University Press.

== Biographies ==
=== Ivan the Great ===
- Fennell, J. L. I. (1963). Ivan the Great of Moscow. Macmillan.
- Grey, I. (1964). Ivan III and the unification of Russia. English Universities Press.

=== Ivan the Terrible ===
- Bogatyrev, S. (2007). Reinventing the Russian monarchy in the 1550s: Ivan the Terrible, the dynasty, and the church. The Slavonic and East European Review, 85(2), 271–293.
- Cherniavsky, M. (1968). Ivan the Terrible as Renaissance prince. Slavic Review, 27(2), 195–211.
- Keenan, E. (2006). How Ivan became "Terrible". Harvard Ukrainian Studies, 28(1/4), 521–542.
- Macnee, C. (1971). Ivan the Terrible. Fortnight, (10), 2.
- Madariaga, I. de. (2006). Ivan the Terrible. Yale University Press.
- Perrie, M., & Pavlov, A. (2016). Ivan the Terrible. Routledge.

=== Other biographies ===
- Barbour, P. L. (1967). Dimitry, called the pretender, tsar and great prince of all Russia, 1605–1606. Macmillan.
- Hughes, D. L. (1990). Sophia, regent of Russia: 1657–1704. Yale University Press.
- Longworth, P. (1984). Alexis: Tsar of all the Russias. Vintage.

== Other works ==
- Lubimenko, I. (1914). The correspondence of Queen Elizabeth with the Russian czars. The American Historical Review, 19(3), 525–542.
- Neuberger, J. (2014). Sergei Eisenstein's Ivan the Terrible as history. The Journal of Modern History, 86(2), 295–334.

== Historiography ==
- Confino, M. (2009). The new Russian historiography, and the old—Some considerations. History and Memory, 21(2), 7–33.
- Filiushkin, A. I. (2002). Post-modernism and the study of the Russian Middle Ages. Kritika: Explorations in Russian and Eurasian History, 3(1), 89–109.
- Graham, H. (1987). How do we know what we know about Ivan the Terrible? (A paradigm). Russian History, 14(1/4), 179–198.
- Halperin, C. (1982). Soviet historiography on Russia and the Mongols. The Russian Review, 41(3), 306–322.
- Karpovich, M. (1943). Klyuchevski and recent trends in Russian historiography. The Slavonic and East European Review, American Series, 2(1), 31–39.
- Kivelson, V. A. (2002). On words, sources, and historical method: Which truth about Muscovy?. Kritika: Explorations in Russian and Eurasian History, 3(3), 487–499.
- Kollmann, N. S. (2001). Convergence, expansion, and experimentation: Current trends in Muscovite history-writing. Kritika: Explorations in Russian and Eurasian History, 2(2), 233–240.
- Kollmann, N. (1987). The grand prince in Muscovite politics: The problem of genre in sources on Ivan's minority. Russian History, 14(1/4), 293–313.
- Mazour, A. (1937). Modern Russian historiography. The Journal of Modern History, 9(2), 169–202.
- Miller, D. (1986). The Kievan principality in the century before the Mongol invasion: An inquiry into recent research and interpretation. Harvard Ukrainian Studies, 10(1/2), 215–240.
- Thaden, E. (1987). Ivan IV in Baltic German historiography. Russian History, 14(1/4), 377–394.
- Vernadsky, G., & Pushkarev, S. G. (1978). Russian historiography: A history. Nordland Publishing.

== Primary sources ==
A limited number of English language translated primary sources referred to in the above works. (Note: The Cambridge History of Russia, Vol. 1 contains an extensive bibliography of Russian language primary sources.)

- Cross, S. H. (2012). The Russian primary chronicle: Laurentian text (O. P. Sherbowitz-Wetzor, Ed.). Medieval Academy of America.
- Kaiser, D. H., & Marker, G. (1994). Reinterpreting Russian history: Readings, 860–1860s (1st ed.). Oxford University Press.
- Pliguzov, A. I. (2023). Documentary sources on the history of Rus´ metropolitanate: The fourteenth to the early sixteenth centuries (Harvard Series in Ukrainian Studies). Harvard Ukrainian Research Institute.
- Zenkovsky, S. A. (Ed.). (1963). Medieval Russia's epics, chronicles, and tales (1st ed.). E. P. Dutton.

== Reference works ==
- Kievan Rus. (2016). Encyclopedia Britannica.
- Auty, R., Obolensky, D., et al. (2010). Companion to Russian studies (Vol. 1, An introduction to Russian history; Vol. 2, Russian language and literature; Vol. 3, An introduction to Russian art and architecture). Cambridge University Press.
- Barnes, I., & Lieven, D. (2015). Restless empire: A historical atlas of Russia (Illustrated ed.). Belknap Press.
- Brown, A., et al. (1982). The Cambridge encyclopedia of Russia and the Soviet Union. Cambridge University Press.
- Channon, J., & Hudson, R. (1995). The Penguin historical atlas of Russia. Penguin.
- Gilbert, M. (2007). The Routledge atlas of Russian history (4th ed.). Routledge.
- Katchanovski, I., Kohut, Z. E., Nebesio, B. Y., & Yurkevich, M. (2013). Historical dictionary of Ukraine (2nd ed.). Scarecrow Press.
- Langer, L. N. (2001). Historical dictionary of medieval Russia. The Scarecrow Press.
- Lerski, H. (1996). Historical dictionary of Poland, 966–1945. Greenwood Publishing.
- Magocsi, P. R. (2017). Carpathian Rus': A historical atlas. University of Toronto Press.
- Millar, J. R. (Ed.). (2004). Encyclopedia of Russian history (4 vols.). Macmillan Library Reference.
- Wieczynski, J. L., et al. (Eds.). (1976–). The modern encyclopedia of Russian and Soviet history. Academic International Press.

== See also ==
- Bibliography of the history of the Early Slavs and Rus'
- Bibliography of Russian history (1613–1917)
- Bibliography of Ukrainian history
- Bibliography of the history of Belarus and Byelorussia
- Bibliography of the history of Poland
