= Bibliography of the history of the Early Slavs and Rus' =

This is a select bibliography of post-World War II English-language books (including translations) and journal articles about the Early Slavs and Rus' and its borderlands until the Mongol invasions beginning in 1223. The sections "General surveys" and "Biographies" contain books; other sections contain both books and journal articles. Book entries have references to journal articles and reviews about them when helpful.

Works listed here are cited in the notes or bibliographies of scholarly sources. Each is published by an academic or major press, written by a recognized expert, or substantially reviewed in scholarly journals; borderline cases are omitted. A selection of primary sources are included. Many of the books below carry their own bibliographies; see the Further reading section for other bibliographies, and the External links section for historical sites, academic sites, and museums.

Citations follow APA style. (Note: Entries are in plain text APA 7 format without templates; templates are used only for reviews and notes.) Book have citations to academic journal or mainstream published reviews when available. For books only partly about the subject, relevant chapter or section titles are provided when useful and available. Translators of the original-language edition are included when possible. In cases where a title or name has appeared with more than one English spelling, the most recent published form is used and a footnote documents any earlier title under which the work appeared.

== General works ==
General works on Russian history which have significant context for Russian history in general or content about this bibliography's timeframe of history.

- Acton, E. (1995). Russia: The tsarist and Soviet legacy (2nd ed.). Longman.
- Ascher, A. (2017). Russia: A short history (3rd rev. ed.). Oneworld Publications.
- Auty, R., & Obolensky, D. D. (Eds.). (1976–1981). Companion to Russian studies (3 vols.). Cambridge University Press.
- Bartlett, R. P. (2005). A history of Russia (Macmillan Essential Histories). Palgrave Macmillan.
- Billington, J. H. (1966). The icon and the axe: An interpretive history of Russian culture. Alfred A. Knopf.
- Blackwell, W. L. (1994). The industrialization of Russia: A historical perspective (3rd ed.). Harlan Davidson.
- Blum, J. (1961). Lord and peasant in Russia from the ninth to the nineteenth century. Princeton University Press.
- Bogatyrev, S. (Ed.). (2004). Russia takes shape: Patterns of integration from the Middle Ages to the present. Finnish Academy of Science and Letters.
- Borrero, M. (2004). Russia: A reference guide from the Renaissance to the present. Facts on File.
- Boterbloem, K. (2018). A history of Russia and its empire: From Mikhail Romanov to Vladimir Putin (2nd ed.). Rowman & Littlefield.
- Boterbloem, K. (2020). Russia as empire: Past and present. Reaktion Books.
- Breyfogle, N., Schrader, A., & Sunderland, W. (Eds.). (2007). Peopling the Russian periphery: Borderland colonization in Eurasian history. Routledge.
- Bushkovitch, P. (2011). A concise history of Russia. Cambridge University Press.
- Chatterjee, C. (2022). Russia in world history: A transnational approach. Bloomsbury Academic.
- Cherniavsky, M. (Ed.). (1970). The structure of Russian history: Interpretive essays. Random House.
- Christian, D. (1998–2018). A history of Russia, Central Asia and Mongolia (2 vols.). Blackwell; Wiley-Blackwell.
- Clarkson, J. D. (1969). A history of Russia (2nd ed.). Random House.
- Connolly, R. (2020). The Russian economy: A very short introduction. Oxford University Press.
- Dmytryshyn, B. (Ed.). (1991). Medieval Russia: A source book, 850–1700 (3rd ed.). Holt, Rinehart and Winston.
- Dmytryshyn, B. (1977). A history of Russia. Prentice-Hall.
- Dukes, P. (1998). A history of Russia: Medieval, modern, contemporary, c. 882–1996 (3rd ed.). Duke University Press.
- Evtuhov, C., Goldfrank, D., Hughes, L., & Stites, R. (2004). A history of Russia: Peoples, legends, events, forces. Houghton Mifflin.
- Figes, O. (2022). The story of Russia. Metropolitan Books.
- Forsyth, J. (1992). A history of the peoples of Siberia: Russia's North Asian colony 1581–1990. Cambridge University Press.
- Freeze, G. L. (Ed.). (2009). Russia: A history (3rd ed.). Oxford University Press.
- Gleason, A. (Ed.). (2009). A companion to Russian history (Wiley-Blackwell Companions to World History). Wiley-Blackwell.
- Grousset, R. (1970). The empire of the steppes: A history of Central Asia (N. Walford, Trans. (Note: Original-language edition: Grousset, R. (1939). L'empire des steppes: Attila, Gengis-Khan, Tamerlan. Payot. Walford's translation was made from the revised 1952 French edition.)). Rutgers University Press.
- Hosking, G. (1997). Russia: People and empire, 1552–1917. Harvard University Press.
- Hosking, G. (2001). Russia and the Russians: A history. Harvard University Press.
- Kochan, L., & Abraham, R. (1983). The making of modern Russia (2nd ed.). Penguin Books.
- Lieven, D. (2000). Empire: The Russian empire and its rivals. John Murray.
- Lieven, D., Perrie, M., & Suny, R. (Eds.). (2006). The Cambridge history of Russia (3 vols.). Cambridge University Press. (Note: The Cambridge History of Russia: Volume 1, From early Rus' to 1689; Volume 2, Imperial Russia, 1689–1917; Volume 3, The twentieth century.)
- Longworth, P. (2005). Russia: The once and future empire from pre-history to Putin. St. Martin's Press.
- Mazour, A. G. (1962). Russia: Tsarist and communist. Van Nostrand.
- Moss, W. G. (1997–2005). A history of Russia (2 vols.; 2nd ed., 2003–2005). Anthem Press.
- Pares, B. (1953). A history of Russia (definitive ed.). Alfred A. Knopf.
- Pipes, R. (1974). Russia under the old regime. Charles Scribner's Sons.
- Poe, M. T. (2003). The Russian moment in world history. Princeton University Press.
- Riasanovsky, N. V., & Steinberg, M. D. (2025). A history of Russia (10th ed.). Oxford University Press.
- Shubin, D. H. (2005). A history of Russian Christianity (4 vols.). Algora Publishing.
- Sumner, B. H. (1943). A short history of Russia. Reynal & Hitchcock.
- Vernadsky, G. (1943–1969). A history of Russia (5 vols.). Yale University Press. (Note: Vernadsky's five volumes are as follows: Vol. 1: Ancient Russia (1943); Vol. 2: Kievan Russia (1948); Vol. 3: The Mongols and Russia (1953); Vol. 4: Russia at the dawn of the modern age (1959); Vol. 5: The tsardom of Moscow, 1547–1682 (2 parts, 1969).)
- Vernadsky, G. (1961). A history of Russia (6th rev. ed.). Yale University Press.
- Ward, C. J., & Thompson, J. M. (2021). Russia: A historical introduction from Kievan Rus' to the present (9th ed.). Routledge.
- Wren, M. C., & Stults, T. (2009). The course of Russian history (5th ed.). Waveland Press.

== Period works (750–1223) ==
- Alef, G. (1983). Rulers and nobles in 15th-century Muscovy. Variorum.
- Birnbaum, H., Flier, M. S., & Rowland, D. B. (1984, 1994). Medieval Russian culture (2 vols.). University of California Press.
- Martin, J. (2007). Medieval Russia, 980–1584. Cambridge University Press.
- Meyendorff, J. (1997). Byzantium and the rise of Russia: A study of Byzantino-Russian relations in the fourteenth century. St Vladimir's Seminary Press.
- Nicolle, D. (1999). Armies of medieval Russia, 750–1250 (Illustrated ed.). Osprey Publishing.
- Ostrowski, D., & Poe, M. T. (Eds.). (2011). Portraits of old Russia: Imagined lives of ordinary people, 1300–1745. Routledge.
- Paszkiewicz, H. (1954). The origin of Russia. University of Chicago Press.
- Presniakov, A. E. (1970). The formation of the great Russian state: A study of Russian history in the thirteenth to fifteenth centuries (A. E. Moorhouse, Trans.). Quadrangle Books.
- Stefanovich, P. S. (2016). The political organization of Rus' in the 10th century. Jahrbücher für Geschichte Osteuropas, 64(4), 529–544.

=== Early Slavs ===
- Barford, P. M. (2001). The early Slavs: Culture and society in early medieval Eastern Europe (1st ed.). Cornell University Press.
- Bocek, V., Jansens, N., & Klir, T. (Eds.). (2020). New perspectives on the early Slavs and the rise of Slavic: Contact and migrations. Universitätsverlag Winter.
- Bogatyrev, S. (2000). The sovereign and his counsellors: Ritualised consultations in Muscovite political culture, 1350s–1570s. Finnish Academy of Science and Letters.
- Curta, F. (2021). Slavs in the making: History, linguistics, and archaeology in Eastern Europe (ca. 500–ca. 700). Routledge.
- Curta, F. (2019). Eastern Europe in the Middle Ages (500–1300) (2 vols., Brill's Companions to European History 19). Brill.
- Curta, F. (2001). The making of the Slavs: History and archaeology of the Lower Danube region, c. 500–700. Cambridge University Press.
- Curta, F. (2006). Southeastern Europe in the Middle Ages, 500–1250. Cambridge University Press.
- Dolukhanov, P. (1996). The early Slavs: Eastern Europe from the initial settlement to the Kievan Rus. Routledge.
- Dvornik, F. (1956). The Slavs: Their early history and civilization. American Academy of Arts and Sciences.
- Garipzanov, I. H. (Ed.). (2008). Franks, Northmen, and Slavs: Identities and state formation in early medieval Europe. Brepols.
- Geary, P. (2001). The myth of nations: The medieval origins of Europe. Princeton University Press.
- Gimbutas, M. A. (1971). The Slavs. Thames & Hudson.
- Halperin, C. (2010). National identity in premodern Rus'. Russian History, 37(3), 275–294.
- Magocsi, P. R. (2015). With their backs to the mountains: A history of Carpathian Rus' and Carpatho-Rusyns. Central European University Press.
- Miller, D. B. (1992). The many frontiers of pre-Mongol Rus'. Russian History, 19(1/4), 231–260.
- Noonan, T. S. (1998). The Islamic world, Russia and the Vikings, 750–900. Ashgate Publishing.
- Plokhy, S. (2010). The origins of the Slavic nations: Premodern identities in Russia, Ukraine, and Belarus. Cambridge University Press.
- Pritsak, O. (1977). The origin of Rus'. The Russian Review, 36(3), 249–273.
- Pritsak, O. (1991). The origin of Rus'. Harvard University Press.
- Raffensperger, C. (2017). The kingdom of Rus' (Past Imperfect). Arc Humanities Press.
- Reisman, E. S. (1988). The absence of a common-descent myth for Rus'. Russian History, 15(1), 9–19.

=== Vikings ===
- Androshchuk, F. (2013). Vikings in the east: Essays on contacts along the road to Byzantium (800–1100) (Studia Byzantina Upsaliensia 14). Uppsala University.
- Davidson, H. R. E. (1976). The Viking road to Byzantium. George Allen & Unwin.
- Duczko, W. (2004). Viking Rus: Studies on the presence of Scandinavians in Eastern Europe (The Northern World 12). Brill.
- Keller, C. (2010). Furs, fish, and ivory: Medieval Norsemen at the Arctic fringe. Journal of the North Atlantic, 3, 1–23.
- Korpela, J. (2014). The Baltic Finnic people in the medieval and pre-modern Eastern European slave trade. Russian History, 41(1), 85–117.
- Kovalev, R. K. (Ed.). (2023). The northern lands of Rus' and the eastern Baltic in the Viking Age and Middle Ages. Brill.
- Martin, J. (1986). Treasure of the land of darkness: The fur trade and its significance for medieval Russia. Cambridge University Press.
- Stalsberg, A. (2001). Scandinavian Viking-Age boat graves in Old Rus'. Russian History, 28(1/4), 359–401.

=== Byzantine Empire ===
- Davidson, H. R. E. (1976). The Viking road to Byzantium. George Allen & Unwin.
- Clucas, L. (Ed.). (1988). The Byzantine legacy in Eastern Europe. East European Monographs.
- Fennell, J. L. (2015). A history of the Russian church to 1488. Routledge.
- Franklin, S. (2002). Byzantium-Rus-Russia: Studies in the translation of Christian culture. Ashgate/Variorum.
- Kazhdan, A. P., & Epstein, A. W. (1985). Change in Byzantine culture in the eleventh and twelfth centuries. University of California Press.
- Maiorov, A. (2015). The alliance between Byzantium and Rus' before the conquest of Constantinople by the crusaders in 1204. Russian History, 42(3), 272–303.
- Meyendorff, J. (1997). Byzantium and the rise of Russia: A study of Byzantino-Russian relations in the fourteenth century. St Vladimir's Seminary Press.
- Obolensky, D. (1971a). The Byzantine commonwealth: Eastern Europe, 500–1453. Weidenfeld & Nicolson.
- Obolensky, D. (1971b). Byzantium and the Slavs: Collected studies. Variorum Reprints.
- Obolensky, D. (1994). Byzantium and the Slavs. St Vladimir's Seminary Press.
- Sedlar, J. W. (1994). East Central Europe in the Middle Ages, 1000–1500. University of Washington Press.
- Shepard, J. (2017). The expansion of Orthodox Europe: Byzantium, the Balkans and Russia. Routledge.

=== Novgorod ===
- Brisbane, M. A. (Ed.). (1992). The archaeology of Novgorod, Russia: Recent results from the town and its hinterland. Society for Medieval Archaeology.
- Birnbaum, H. (1996). Novgorod in focus: Selected essays. Slavica.
- Bushkovitch, P. (1975). Urban ideology in medieval Novgorod: An iconographic approach. Cahiers du Monde russe et soviétique, 16(1), 19–26.
- Halperin, C. J. (1999). Novgorod and the "Novgorodian Land". Cahiers du Monde russe, 40(3), 345–363.
- Kolchin, B. A. (1989). Wooden artefacts from medieval Novgorod. British Archaeological Reports.
- Lelis, A. A. (2005). The view from the northwest: The Chronicle of Novgorod as the mirror of local experience of Rus' history, 1016–1333. Russian History, 32(3/4), 389–399.
- Levin, E. (1983). Women and property in medieval Novgorod: Dependence and independence. Russian History, 10(2), 154–169.
- Paul, M. C. (2003). Episcopal election in Novgorod, Russia 1156–1478. Church History, 72(2), 251–275.
- Raba, J. (1967). The fate of the Novgorodian republic. The Slavonic and East European Review, 45(105), 307–323.
- Sevastyanova, O. (2010). In quest of the key democratic institution of medieval Rus': Was the "veche" an institution that represented Novgorod as a city and a republic?. Jahrbücher für Geschichte Osteuropas, 58(1), 1–23.
- Thompson, M. W. (1967). Novgorod the Great: Excavations at the medieval city directed by A. V. Artsikhovsky and B. A. Kolchin. Evelyn, Adams & Mackay.

=== Khazaria ===
- Golden, P. B., Ben-Shammai, H., & Róna-Tas, A. (Eds.). (2007). The world of the Khazars: New perspectives (Handbook of Oriental Studies, Section 8, Vol. 17). Brill.
- Zhivkov, B. (2015). Khazaria in the ninth and tenth centuries (D. Manova, Trans.; East Central and Eastern Europe in the Middle Ages, 450–1450, Vol. 30). Brill.

=== Kievan Rus' ===
- Dimnik, M. (1987). The "testament" of Iaroslav "the Wise": A re-examination. Canadian Slavonic Papers / Revue Canadienne des Slavistes, 29(4), 369–386.
- Dimnik, M. (1994). The dynasty of Chernigov, 1054–1146. Pontifical Institute of Mediaeval Studies.
- Dimnik, M. (1996). Succession and inheritance in Rus' before 1054. Pontifical Institute of Mediaeval Studies.
- Dimnik, M. (2003). The dynasty of Chernigov, 1146–1246 (2nd ed.). Cambridge University Press.
- Dvornichenko, A. Y. (2016). The place of the Kievan Rus in history. Vestnik of Saint Petersburg University: History, 61(4), 5–17.
- Fennell, J. (1983, 2014). The crisis of medieval Russia, 1200–1304. Routledge.
- Franklin, S. (2001). Pre-Mongol Rus': New sources, new perspectives?. The Russian Review, 60(4), 465–473.
- Franklin, S. (2006). Kievan Rus' (1015–1125). In M. Perrie (Ed.), The Cambridge history of Russia (Vol. 1, pp. 73–97). Cambridge University Press.
- Franklin, S., & Shepard, J. (1996). The emergence of Rus: 750–1200. Routledge.
- Halperin, C. J. (2015). A comparative approach to Kievan Rus'. Russian History, 42(2), 149–157.
- Hanak, W. K. (2013). The nature and the image of princely power in Kievan Rus', 980–1054: A study of sources. Brill.
- Hraundal, T. (2014). New perspectives on eastern Vikings/Rus in Arabic sources. Viking and Medieval Scandinavia, 10, 65–98.
- Hrushevsky, M. (1997). History of Ukraine-Rus' (3 vols.). Canadian Institute of Ukrainian Studies Press.
- Hurwitz, E. S. (1980). Prince Andrej Bogoljubskij: The man and the myth. Licosa Editrice.
- Korpela, J. (2001). Prince, saint and apostle: Prince Vladimir Svjatoslavic of Kiev, his posthumous life, and the religious legitimization of the Russian great power. Otto Harrassowitz.
- Kovalev, R. (2015). Reimagining Kievan Rus' in unimagined Europe. Russian History, 42(2), 158–187.
- Maiorov, A. (2015). The alliance between Byzantium and Rus' before the conquest of Constantinople by the crusaders in 1204. Russian History, 42(3), 272–303.
- Marinich, V. G. (1976). Revitalization movements in Kievan Russia. Journal for the Scientific Study of Religion, 15(1), 61–68.
- Martin, J. (2006). Calculating seniority and the contests for succession in Kievan Rus'. Russian History, 33(2/4), 267–281.
- Miller, D. B. (1992). The many frontiers of pre-Mongol Rus'. Russian History, 19(1/4), 231–260.
- Pelenski, J. (1977). The origins of the official Muscovite claims to the "Kievan inheritance". Harvard Ukrainian Studies, 1(1), 29–52.
- Pelenski, J. (1987). The sack of Kiev of 1169: Its significance for the succession to Kievan Rus'. Harvard Ukrainian Studies, 11(3/4), 303–316.
- Pelenski, J. (1988). The contest for the "Kievan succession" (1155–1175): The religious-ecclesiastical dimension. Harvard Ukrainian Studies, 12/13, 761–780.
- Pelenski, J. (1998). The contest for the legacy of Kievan Rus'. East European Monographs, Columbia University Press.
- Raffensperger, C. (2012). Reimagining Europe: Kievan Rus' in the medieval world. Harvard University Press.
- Raffensperger, C. (2016). Ties of kinship: Genealogy and dynastic marriage in Kyivan Rus´ (Harvard Series in Ukrainian Studies). Harvard Ukrainian Research Institute.
- Raffensperger, C., & Ostrowski, D. (2023). The ruling families of Rus: Clan, family and kingdom. Reaktion Books.
- Rappoport, P. A. (1995). Building the churches of Kievan Russia. Routledge.
- Rybakov, B. A. (1984). Kievan Rus. Progress Publishers.
- Stefanovich, P. (2016). The political organization of Rus' in the 10th century. Jahrbücher für Geschichte Osteuropas, 64(4), Neue Folge, 529–544.
- Vernadsky, G. (1973). Kievan Russia (A history of Russia, Vol. 2). Yale University Press.

== Art, architecture, literature, and culture ==
- Franklin, S. (2002). Writing, society and culture in early Rus, c. 950–1300. Cambridge University Press.
- Gasparov, B., & Raevsky-Hughes, O. (Eds.). (1993). Slavic cultures in the Middle Ages. University of California Press.
- Lazarev, V. N. (1966). Old Russian murals and mosaics. Phaidon.
- Lenhoff, G. (1989). The martyred princes Boris and Gleb: A socio-cultural study of the cult and the texts. Slavica.
- Thomson, F. J. (1999). The reception of Byzantine culture in mediaeval Russia. Ashgate.
- Zguta, R. (1978). Russian minstrels: A history of the skomorokhi. University of Pennsylvania Press.
- Zguta, R. (1972). Skomorokhi: The Russian minstrel-entertainers. Slavic Review, 31(2), 297–313.

== Religion and beliefs ==
- Blakey, K. (1924). Folk tales of ancient Russia (Byliny of Lord Novgorod the Great). The Slavonic Review, 3(7), 52–62.
- Bremer, T. (2013). Cross and Kremlin: A brief history of the Orthodox Church in Russia (E. W. Gritsch, Trans.). Eerdmans.
- Challis, N., & Dewey, H. (1987). Basil the Blessed, holy fool of Moscow. Russian History, 14(1/4), 47–59.
- Clucas, L. (Ed.). (1988). The Byzantine legacy in Eastern Europe. East European Monographs.
- Ericsson, K. (1966). The earliest conversion of the Rus' to Christianity. The Slavonic and East European Review, 44(102), 98–121.
- Fedotov, G. P. (1966). The Russian religious mind. Harvard University Press.
- Fennell, J. L. (2015). A history of the Russian church to 1488. Routledge.
- Franklin, S. (2002). Byzantium-Rus-Russia: Studies in the translation of Christian culture. Ashgate/Variorum.
- Kivelson, V. A., & Worobec, C. D. (Eds.). (2020). Witchcraft in Russia and Ukraine, 1000–1900: A sourcebook (NIU Series in Slavic, East European, and Eurasian Studies). Northern Illinois University Press.
- Kulik, A. (2023). Jews in Old Rus´: A documentary history (Harvard Series in Ukrainian Studies). Harvard Ukrainian Research Institute.
- Levin, E. (1989). Sex and society in the world of the Orthodox Slavs, 900–1700. Cornell University Press.
- Majeska, G. P. (2005). Patriarch Photius and the conversion of the Rus'. Russian History, 32(3/4), 413–418.
- Paul, M. C. (2003). Episcopal election in Novgorod, Russia 1156–1478. Church History, 72(2), 251–275.
- Poppe, A. (2007). Christian Russia in the making (Variorum Collected Studies CS867). Ashgate.
- Poppe, A. (1976). The political background to the baptism of Rus': Byzantine-Russian relations between 986–89. Dumbarton Oaks Papers, 30, 195–244.
- Poppe, A. (1982). The rise of Christian Russia. Variorum.
- Senyk, S. (1993). A history of the church in Ukraine: Vol. 1. To the end of the thirteenth century. Pontificio Istituto Orientale.
- Ševčenko, I. (1960). The Christianization of Kievan Rus'. The Polish Review, 5(4), 29–35.
- Shchapov, Ia. N. (1993). State and church in early Russia, 10th–13th centuries (V. Schneierson, Trans.). Aristide D. Caratzas.
- Shepard, J. (2017). The expansion of Orthodox Europe: Byzantium, the Balkans and Russia. Routledge.
- Shubin, D. H. (2005). A history of Russian Christianity (4 vols.). Agathon Press.
- Vlasto, A. P. (1970). The entry of the Slavs into Christendom: An introduction to the medieval history of the Slavs. Cambridge University Press.
- Weickhardt, G. G. (2001). The canon law of Rus', 1100–1551. Russian History, 28(1/4), 411–446.
- White, M. (2013). Military saints in Byzantium and Rus, 900–1200. Cambridge University Press.

== Law ==
- Feldbrugge, F. J. M. (2009). Law in medieval Russia (Law in Eastern Europe, Vol. 59). Martinus Nijhoff.
- Franklin, S. (2007). On meanings, functions and paradigms of law in early Rus'. Russian History, 34(1/4), 63–81.
- Kaiser, D. H. (1980a). The growth of the law in medieval Russia. Princeton University Press.
- Kaiser, D. H. (1980b). Reconsidering crime and punishment in Kievan Rus'. Russian History, 7(3), 283–293.
- Kleimola, A. M. (1975). Justice in medieval Russia: Muscovite judgment charters (pravye gramoty) of the fifteenth and sixteenth centuries. Transactions of the American Philosophical Society, New Series, 65(6).
- Zguta, R. (1981). Medicine as reflected in the laws of early Rus'. The Russian Review, 40(1), 47–54.

== Other topics ==
- Bell, J. (2023). Slavic seiðr? Reconsidering the volkhvy of northern Rus´. Kritika: Explorations in Russian and Eurasian History, 24(2), 245–268.
- Birnbaum, H. (1981). Lord Novgorod the Great: Essays in the history and culture of a medieval city-state. Slavica Publishers.
- Franklin, S. (1985). Literacy and documentation in early medieval Russia. Speculum, 60(1), 1–38.
- Halperin, C. J. (2022). The rise and demise of the myth of the Rus' land (Beyond Medieval Europe). Arc Humanities Press.
- Hartley, J. M. (2021). The Volga: A history. Yale University Press.
- Herlihy, P. (1991). Joy of the Rus': Rites and rituals of Russian drinking. The Russian Review, 50(2), 131–147.
- Koloda, V., & Gorbanenko, S. (2020). Agriculture in the forest-steppe region of Khazaria (East Central and Eastern Europe in the Middle Ages, 450–1450, Vol. 60). Brill.
- Kulik, A. (2014). Jews and the language of eastern Slavs. The Jewish Quarterly Review, 104(1), 105–143.
- Lelis, A. A. (2005). The view from the northwest: The Chronicle of Novgorod as the mirror of local experience of Rus' history, 1016–1333. Russian History, 32(3/4), 389–399.
- Miller, D. B. (1989). Monumental building as an indicator of economic trends in northern Rus' in the late Kievan and Mongol periods, 1138–1462. The American Historical Review, 94(2), 360–390.
- Pritsak, O. (1998). The origins of the Old Rus' weights and monetary systems: Two studies in western Eurasian metrology and numismatics in the seventh to eleventh centuries (Harvard Series in Ukrainian Studies). Harvard Ukrainian Research Institute.
- Schaeken, J. (2019). Voices on birchbark: Everyday communication in medieval Russia. Brill.

== Biographies ==
- Butler, F. (2008). Ol'ga's conversion and the construction of chronicle narrative. The Russian Review, 67(2), 230–242.
- Dimnik, M. (1981). Mikhail, prince of Chernigov and grand prince of Kiev, 1224–1246. Pontifical Institute of Mediaeval Studies.
- Hurwitz, E. S. (1980). Prince Andrej Bogoljubskij: The man and the myth. Licosa Editrice.
- Isoaho, M. (2006). The image of Aleksandr Nevskiy in medieval Russia: Warrior and saint. Brill.
- Luciw, J. (1986). Sviatoslav the Conqueror: Creator of a great Kyivian Rusʹ empire. Slavia Library.
- Raffensperger, C. (2009). Shared (hi)stories: Vladimir of Rus' and Harald Fairhair of Norway. The Russian Review, 68(4), 569–582.

== Historiography ==
- Confino, M. (2009). The new Russian historiography, and the old—Some considerations. History and Memory, 21(2), 7–33.
- Franklin, S. (2001). Pre-Mongol Rus': New sources, new perspectives?. The Russian Review, 60(4), 465–473.
- Hanak, W. K. (2013). The nature and the image of princely power in Kievan Rus', 980–1054: A study of sources. Brill.
- Karpovich, M. (1943). Klyuchevski and recent trends in Russian historiography. The Slavonic and East European Review, American Series, 2(1), 31–39.
- Mazour, A. (1937). Modern Russian historiography. The Journal of Modern History, 9(2), 169–202.
- Miller, D. (1986). The Kievan principality in the century before the Mongol invasion: An inquiry into recent research and interpretation. Harvard Ukrainian Studies, 10(1/2), 215–240.
- Pelenski, J. (1998). The contest for the legacy of Kievan Rus'. East European Monographs, Columbia University.
- Vernadsky, G., & Pushkarev, S. G. (1978). Russian historiography: A history. Nordland Publishing.

== Primary sources ==
A limited number of English language translated primary sources referred to in the above works. (Note: The Cambridge History of Russia, Vol. 1 contains an extensive bibliography of Russian language primary sources.)

- Constantine VII Porphyrogenitus. (1967). De administrando imperio (G. Moravcsik, Ed.; R. J. H. Jenkins, Trans.; 2nd ed.). Dumbarton Oaks.
- Cross, S. H. (2012). The Russian primary chronicle: Laurentian text (O. P. Sherbowitz-Wetzor, Ed.). Medieval Academy of America.
- Franklin, S. (Trans.). (1991). Sermons and rhetoric of Kievan Rus'. Harvard University Press.
- Golb, N., & Pritsak, O. (1982). Khazarian Hebrew documents of the tenth century. Cornell University Press.
- Hanak, W. K. (2013). The nature and the image of princely power in Kievan Rus', 980–1054: A study of sources. Brill.
- Heppell, M. (Trans.). (1989). The paterik of the Kievan Caves Monastery. Harvard University Press.
- Hollingsworth, P. (Trans.). (1992). The hagiography of Kievan Rus'. Harvard University Press.
- Kaiser, D. H. (Ed. & Trans.). (1992). The laws of Rus': Tenth to fifteenth centuries. Charles Schlacks.
- Kaiser, D. H., & Marker, G. (1994). Reinterpreting Russian history: Readings, 860–1860s (1st ed.). Oxford University Press.
- Michell, R., & Forbes, N. (Trans.). (1914). The chronicle of Novgorod, 1016–1471. Royal Historical Society.
- Ostrowski, D., Birnbaum, D. J., & Lunt, H. G. (Eds.). (2003). The Povest' vremennykh let: An interlinear collation and paradosis. Harvard Ukrainian Research Institute.
- Vernadsky, G., Fisher, R. T., Jr., Ferguson, A. D., Lossky, A., & Pushkarev, S. G. (Eds.). (1972). A source book for Russian history from early times to 1917 (Vol. 1). Yale University Press.
- Zenkovsky, S. A. (Ed.). (1963). Medieval Russia's epics, chronicles, and tales (1st ed.). E. P. Dutton.

== Reference works ==
- Kievan Rus. (2016). Encyclopedia Britannica.
- Auty, R., Obolensky, D., et al. (2010). Companion to Russian studies (Vol. 1, An introduction to Russian history; Vol. 2, Russian language and literature; Vol. 3, An introduction to Russian art and architecture). Cambridge University Press.
- Barnes, I., & Lieven, D. (2015). Restless empire: A historical atlas of Russia (Illustrated ed.). Belknap Press.
- Brown, A., et al. (1982). The Cambridge encyclopedia of Russia and the Soviet Union. Cambridge University Press.
- Channon, J., & Hudson, R. (1995). The Penguin historical atlas of Russia. Penguin.
- Gilbert, M. (2007). The Routledge atlas of Russian history (4th ed.). Routledge.
- Katchanovski, I., Kohut, Z. E., Nebesio, B. Y., & Yurkevich, M. (2013). Historical dictionary of Ukraine (2nd ed.). Scarecrow Press.
- Langer, L. N. (2001). Historical dictionary of medieval Russia. The Scarecrow Press.
- Lerski, H. (1996). Historical dictionary of Poland, 966–1945. Greenwood Publishing.
- Magocsi, P. R. (2017). Carpathian Rus': A historical atlas. University of Toronto Press.
- Millar, J. R. (Ed.). (2004). Encyclopedia of Russian history (4 vols.). Macmillan Library Reference.
- Wieczynski, J. L., et al. (Eds.). (1976–). The modern encyclopedia of Russian and Soviet history. Academic International Press.

== See also ==
- Bibliography of Russian history (1223–1613)
- Bibliography of Russian history (1613–1917)
- Bibliography of Ukrainian history
- Bibliography of the history of Belarus and Byelorussia
