= Lord and Peasant in Russia =

1961 book by Jerome Blum, on history of Russia

Lord and Peasant in Russia from the Ninth to the Nineteenth Century
- Book cover
- Author: Jerome Blum
- Language: English
- Subject: Russian History
- Genre: Non fiction, History
- Published: 1961
- Publisher: Princeton University Press
- Publication place: United States
- Media type: Hardcover, Paperback, Kindle, eBook, Audiobook
- Pages: 688
- Website: Book website, Princeton University Press

Lord and Peasant in Russia from the Ninth to the Nineteenth Century is a political-social-economic history of Russia written by historian Jerome Blum and published by Princeton University Press in 1961. The work covers the period from Varangian origins, to the end of serfdom in the 19th century.

== Synopsis ==
The book centers on the evolving relationships between landowners and peasants and how that relationship impacted the politics and economic conditions inside Russia. The author explores how the growing power of towns and trade, a dispersed population, and poor transportation and communications networks influenced this fundamental social relationship underlying Russian society. In the introduction to the work, the author describes their intention to,

"trace the history of the lords and peasants, and of the relationships between them" through a period of one thousand years, "against the background of Russian political and economic evolution, " to produce "a study in the history of human freedom" and to "contribute ultimately to an understanding of the history of freedom in the European world" (Note: Quoted sections from reference are from Lord and Peasant in Russia, Introduction, pp.3-5 (hardcover))

The work begins with a brief introduction about the physical geography of Russia and the nature of serfdom. From here the author works chronologically through its period, with short sections on the Kievan and Mongol eras, followed by a longer section on the 16th and 17th centuries and the establishment of serfdom. The final 150 years of serfdom make up the longest section and almost half the book.

== Academic reception ==
Lord and Peasant in Russia has been widely reviewed within the academic community and has become a part of the reading curriculum at several universities.

Reviews

- Anderson, M. S. (1962). "Book Review: Lord and Peasant in Russia by J. Blum". The Economic History Review. 15 (1): 180–181. doi:10.2307/2593312. JSTOR 2593312.
- Backus, Oswald P. (1963). "Book Review: Lord and Peasant in Russia by J. Blum". The Slavic and East European Journal. 7 (2): 220–221. doi:10.2307/304638. JSTOR 304638.
- Crisp, Olga (1963). "Book Review: Lord and Peasant in Russia by J. Blum". The Slavonic and East European Review. 41 (97): 559–561. JSTOR 4205488.
- De Maddalena, Aldo (1964). "Book Review: Lord and Peasant in Russia by J. Blum". Giornale degli Economisti e Annali di Economia. 23 (7/8): 616. JSTOR 23247623.
- Dewey, Horace W. (1962). "Book Review: Lord and Peasant in Russia by J. Blum". Speculum. 37 (3): 409–411. doi:10.2307/2852366. JSTOR 2852366.
- Dunbar, Robert G. (1962). "Book Review: Lord and Peasant in Russia by J. Blum". Agricultural History. 36 (2): 110–111. JSTOR 3740949.
- Eowmianski, Henryk (1963). "The Russian Peasantry". Past & Present (26): 102–109. doi:10.1093/past/26.1.102. JSTOR 649907.
- Gerschenkron, Alexander (1964). ""Lord and Peasant in Russia from the Ninth to the Nineteenth Century"". The Journal of Economic History. 24 (1): 53–59. doi:10.1017/S0022050700089889. JSTOR 2115613.
- Jablonowski, Horst (1964). "Book Review: Lord and Peasant in Russia by J. Blum". Jahrbücher für Geschichte Osteuropas. 12 (3): 429–431. JSTOR 41042367.
- Kahan, Arcadius (1962). "Book Review: Lord and Peasant in Russia by J. Blum". Journal of Political Economy. 70 (5): 507–508. doi:10.1086/258703. JSTOR 1829002.
- Mazour, Anatole G. (1962). "Book Review: Lord and Peasant in Russia by J. Blum". The American Historical Review. 67 (4): 1037–1038. doi:10.2307/1845287. JSTOR 1845287.
- McNally, Raymond T. (1962). "Book Review: Lord and Peasant in Russia by J. Blum". The Catholic Historical Review. 48 (3): 417–418. JSTOR 25017112.
- Raeff, Marc (1962). "Book Review: Lord and Peasant in Russia by J. Blum". Political Science Quarterly. 77 (2): 307–310. doi:10.2307/2145897. JSTOR 2145897.
- Riasanovsky, Nicholas V. (1963). "Book Review: Lord and Peasant in Russia from the Ninth to the Nineteenth Century by Jerome Blum (review)". The Canadian Historical Review. 44 (1): 71–72. doi:10.3138/chr-044-01-br26.
- Sinzheimer, G. P. G. (1962). "Book Review: Lord and Peasant in Russia by J. Blum". The Historian. 24 (4): 514–515. JSTOR 24438035.
- Smith, R. E. F. (1963). "Book Review: Lord and Peasant in Russia by J. Blum". The Agricultural History Review. 11 (1): 52–53. JSTOR 40273046.
- Tompkins, Stuart R. (1962). "Book Review: Lord and Peasant in Russia by J. Blum". The Annals of the American Academy of Political and Social Science. 343: 154–155. JSTOR 1033634.
- Szeftel, Marc (1962). "Book Review: Lord and Peasant in Russia by J. Blum". Slavic Review. 21 (3): 527–529. doi:10.2307/3000454. JSTOR 3000454.
- Timasheff, N. S. (1962). "Book Review: Lord and Peasant in Russia by J. Blum". Social Research. 29 (2): 246–248. JSTOR 40969602.

Quotes

- M. S. Anderson of the London School of Economics wrote in their review, whatever faults the book may contain, "this is a solid and extremely useful piece of work. It will remain for many years a mine of information for students and an essential tool for teachers."
- Alexander Gerschenkron of Harvard University writes in the Journal of Economic History "To say it at once, Jerome Blum's new book of this title is a most impressive piece of work.' Here is the history of one thousand years of Russian agrarian relations, presented with a knowledge of the subject and a lucidity in the narration that will make this book a standard work in the field for many years to come."

== About the author ==
Jerome Blum was an American historian and professor at Princeton University; Blum was chairman of the Department of History at Princeton from 1961–1967, and was named Henry Charles Lea Professor of History in 1966. Their scholarship centers on Agricultural history in central and eastern Europe. They received their Ph.D. from Johns Hopkins University in 1947. He was a member of the American Philosophical Society, which published a memorial to him in their proceedings. In addition to Lord and Peasant in Russia, Blum is the author of several books, including:

- Noble Landowners and Agriculture in Austria: 1815–1848, (1948).
- The Emergence of the European World, (1966).
- The European World since 1815: Triumph and Transition, (1970).
- The End of the Old Order in Rural Europe, (1978).
- Our Forgotten Past: Seven Centuries of Life on the Land, (1982).
- In the Beginning: The Advent of the Modern Age: Europe in the 1840s, (1994).

== See also ==
- Serfdom in Russia
- Emancipation reform of 1861
