= The Making of the Slavs: History and Archaeology of the Lower Danube Region =

Book about the ethnogenesis of Slavic peoples

The Making of the Slavs: History and Archaeology of the Lower Danube Region c. 500-700
- Book cover
- Author: Florin Curta
- Language: English
- Subject: History of Russia, History of Ukraine, History of Belarus
- Genre: History, non-fiction
- Publisher: Cambridge University Press
- Publication date: 2001
- Pages: 463
- ISBN: 9780521802024
- Website: Cambridge University Press page

The Making of the Slavs: History and Archaeology of the Lower Danube Region c. 500-700 is a work about early Slavic history by Florin Curta and published in 2001 by Cambridge University Press. It introduces a new approach about the ethnogenesis of the early Slavs, especially in Southeastern Europe, advancing a hypothesis that the early Slavic identity was an invention of the Byzantine Empire on the Danubian Limes, and with Slavic language it spread without mass migration from Slavic Urheimat.

A new revised version of the work was published as Slavs in the Making: History, Linguistics, and Archaeology in Eastern Europe (ca. 500-ca. 700) in 2020 by Routledge, as "another attempt to convince the skeptical scientific community of the viability of a postmodern interpretation of the early medieval Slavs".

== Academic journal reviews ==
- Barford, Paul M. (2002). "Reviewed work: The Making of the Slavs: History and Archaeology of the Lower Danube Region c. 500-700, Florin Curta". Slavic Review. 61 (3): 584–585. doi:10.2307/3090305. JSTOR 3090305.
- Milich, Petar (2003). "Reviewed work: The Making of the Slavs. History and Archaeology of the Lower Danube Region c. 500-700, Florin Curta; the Early Slavs. Culture and Society in Early Medieval Europe, P. M. Barford; Rex Germanorum. Populos Sclavorum. An Inquiry into the Origin and Early History of the Serbs/Slavs of Sarmatia, Germania, and Illyria, Ivo Vukcevich". Jahrbücher für Geschichte Osteuropas. 51 (1): 90–98. JSTOR 41051005.
- Šašková-Pierce, Mila (2005). "Reviewed work: The Making of Slavs: History and Archaeology of the Lower Danube Region c. 500-700, Florin Curta, Jesse Savage". The Slavic and East European Journal. 49 (2): 343–344. doi:10.2307/20058288. JSTOR 20058288.
- Stephenson, Paul (2002). "Reviewed work: The Making of the Slavs: History and Archaeology of the Lower Danube Region, c. 500-700, Florin Curta". The International History Review. 24 (3): 629–631. JSTOR 40110202.
- Todorov, Boris (2002). "The Making of the Slavs. History and Archaeology of the Lower Danube Region, c. 500–700 by Florin Curta". Comitatus: A Journal of Medieval and Renaissance Studies. 33: 178–180. doi:10.1353/cjm.2002.0035. S2CID 162336262.
- Wolverton, Lisa (2003). "The Making of the Slavs: History and Archeology of the Lower Danube Region ca. 500-700 (review)". Journal of Interdisciplinary History. 34 (1): 92–93. doi:10.1162/002219503322645655. ISSN 1530-9169. S2CID 143226004.

== About the author ==
Florin Curta (born January 15, 1965) is a Romanian-born American archaeologist and historian who is a professor of medieval history and archaeology at the University of Florida. Curta is known for an unorthodox approach and interpretation of the ethnogenesis of the Early Slavs, a hypothesis published first in The Making of the Slavs: History and Archaeology of the Lower Danube Region (2001), and met with negative criticism.

== See also ==
- Myth of Nations. The Medieval Origins of Europe
- The Gates of Europe: A History of Ukraine
- The Origins of the Slavic Nations
- Slavic migrations to the Balkans
