= Bibliography of Ukrainian history =

Flag of modern Ukraine

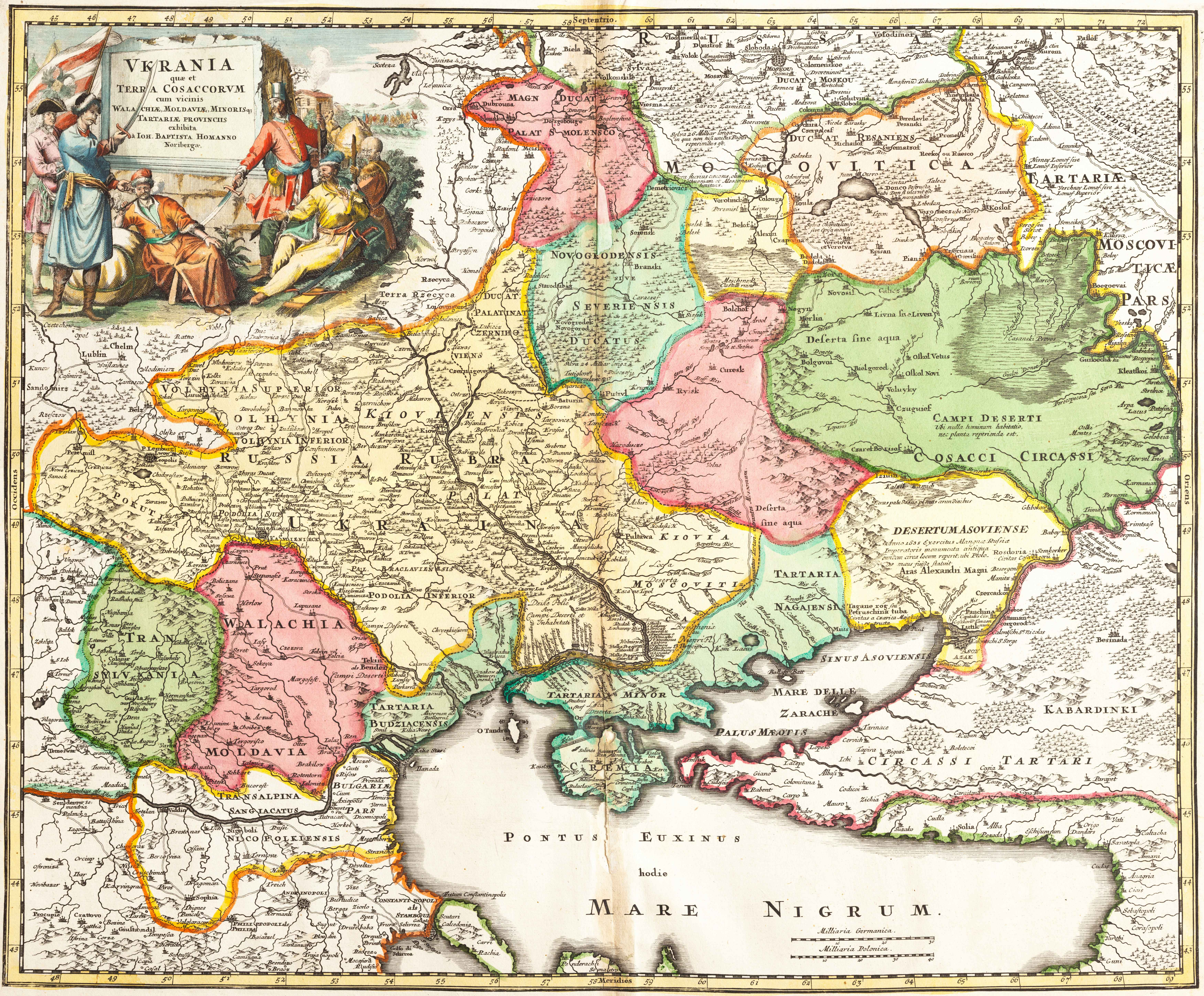
Historical map of Ukrainian lands

Map of modern Ukraine (claims and control as of 23 February 2022)

Principalities of Kievan Rus' (1054–1132)

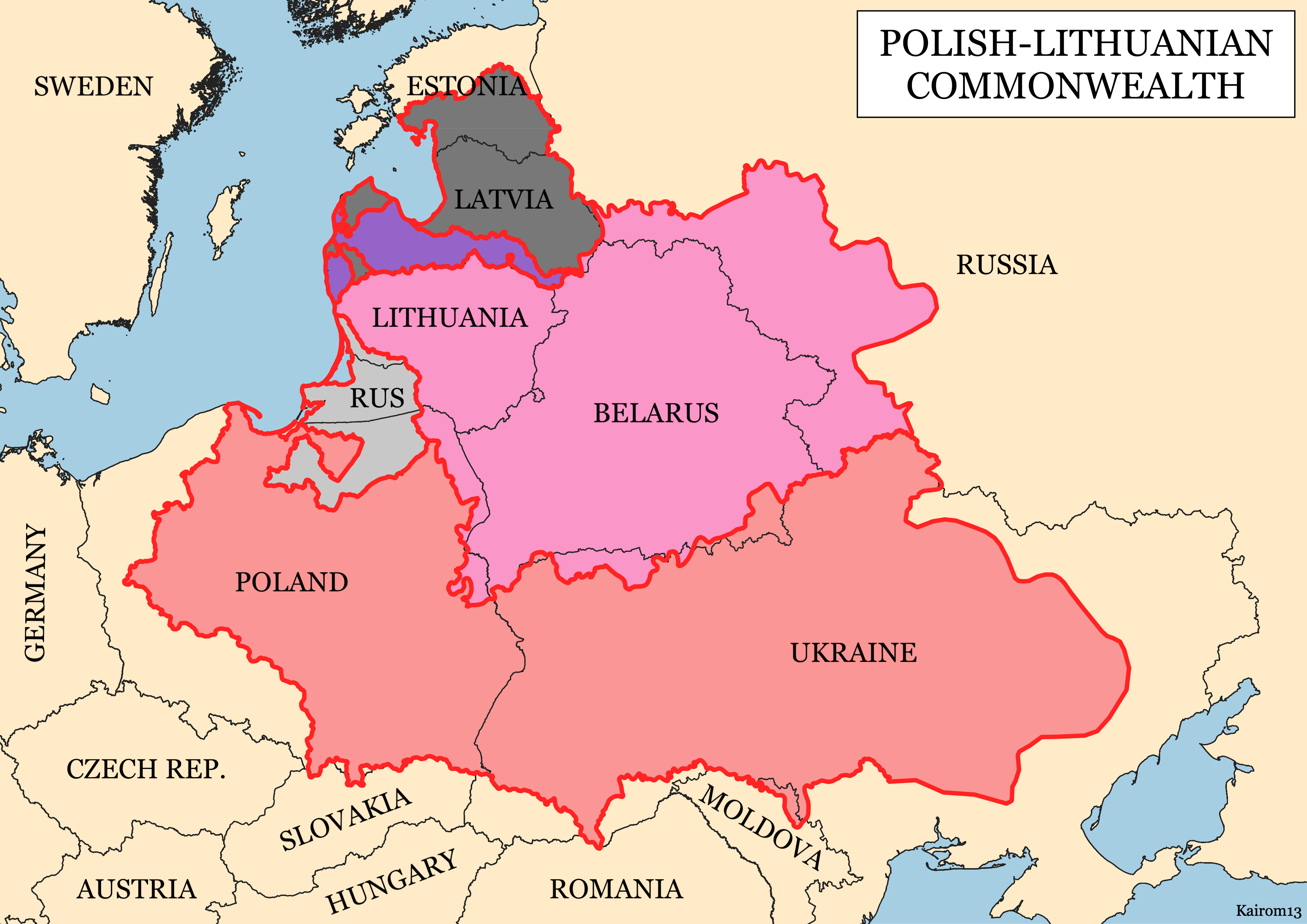
Polish–Lithuanian Commonwealth

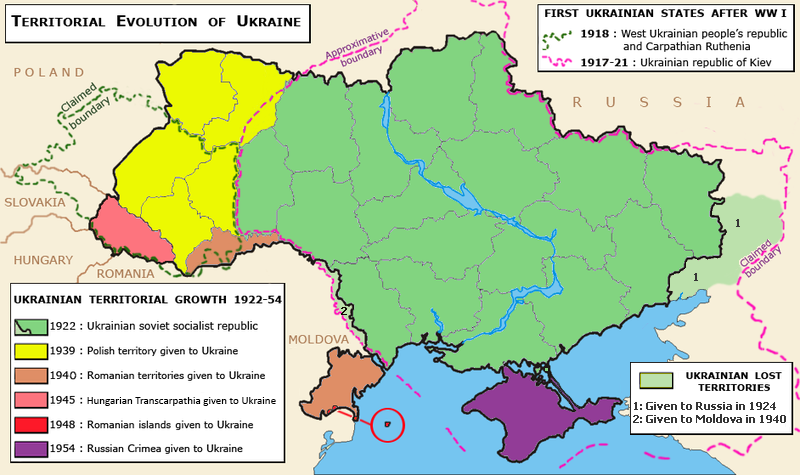
Ukrainian Soviet Socialist Republic (1918–1991)

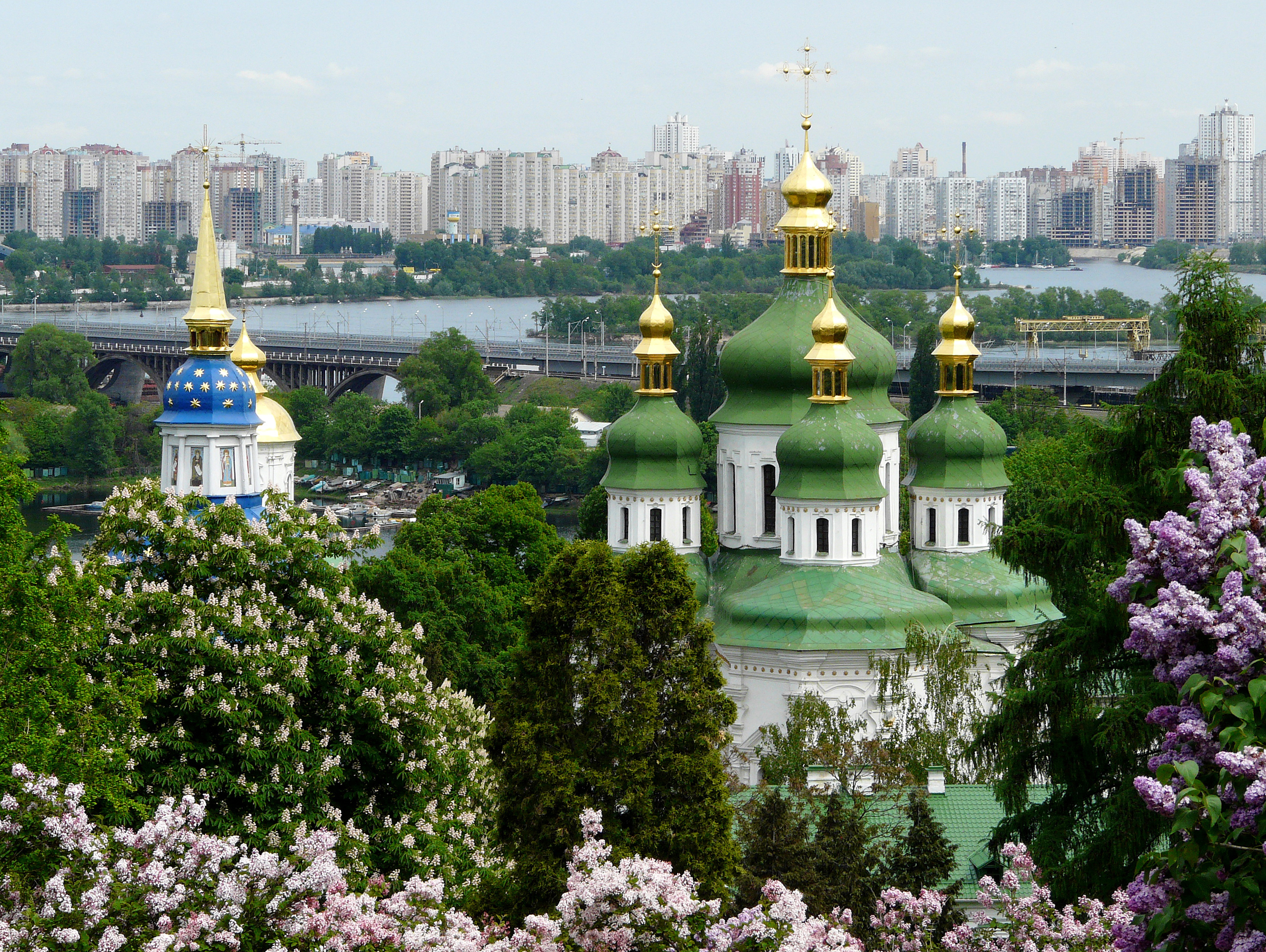
Kyiv

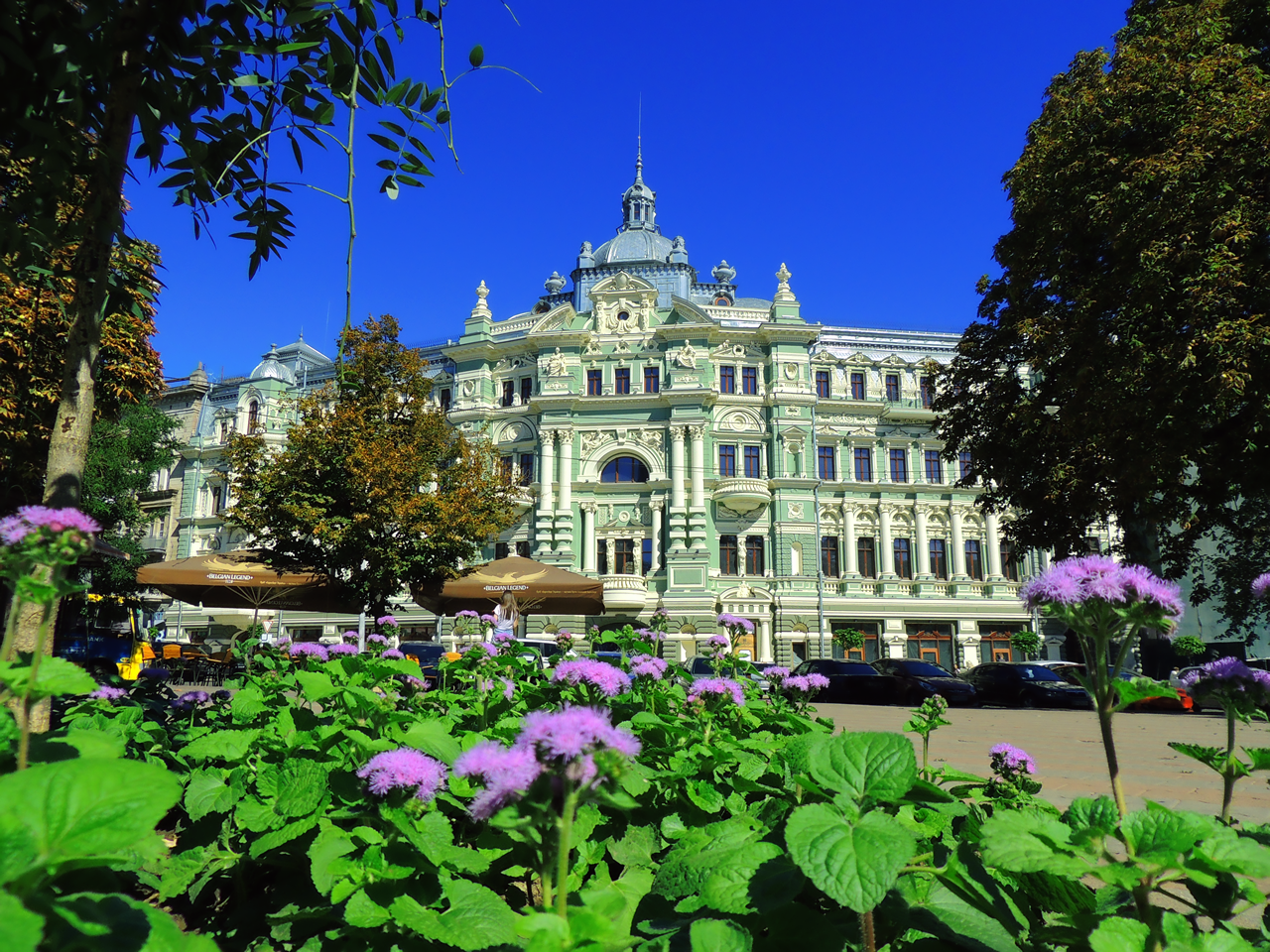
Odesa

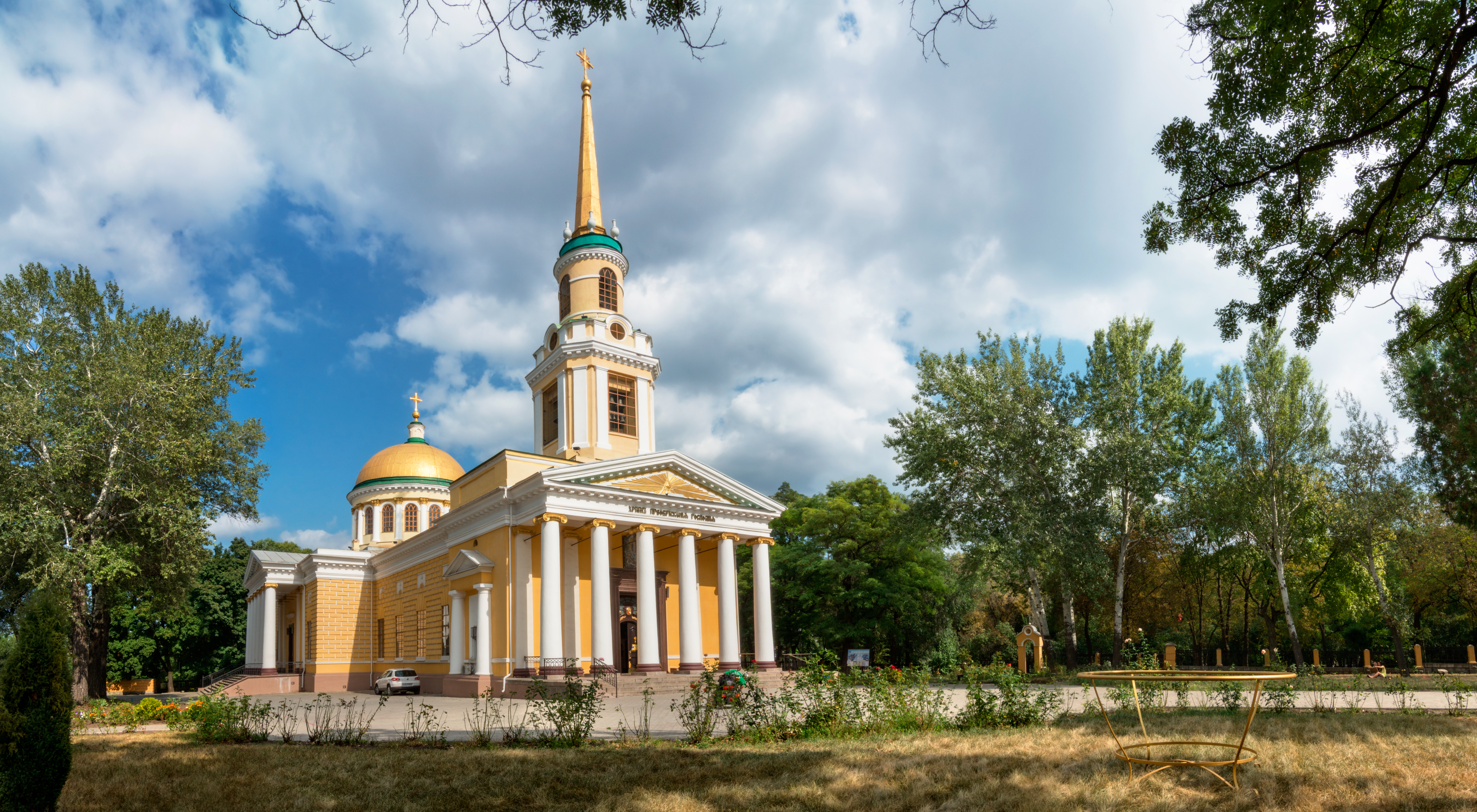
Dnipro

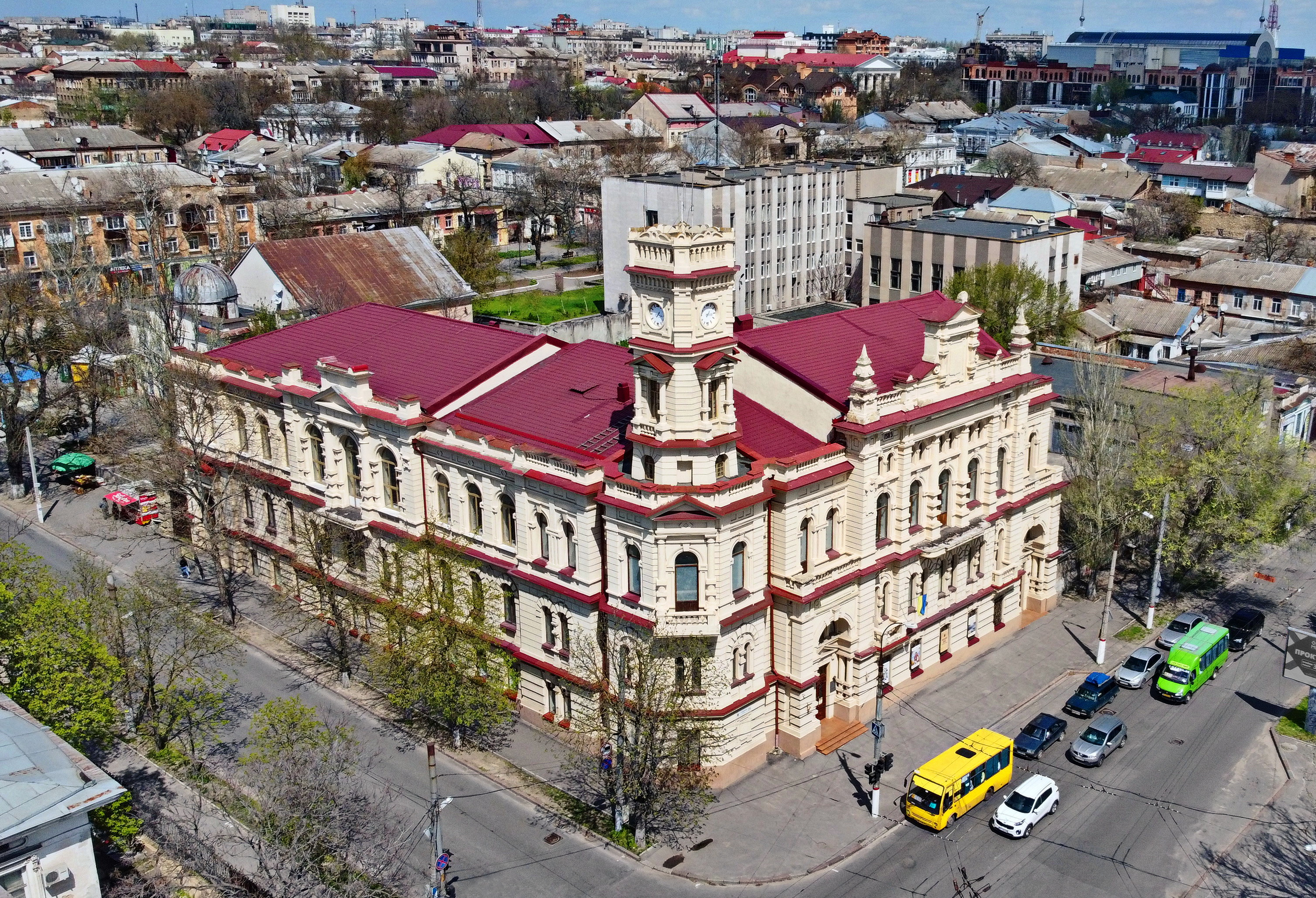
Kherson

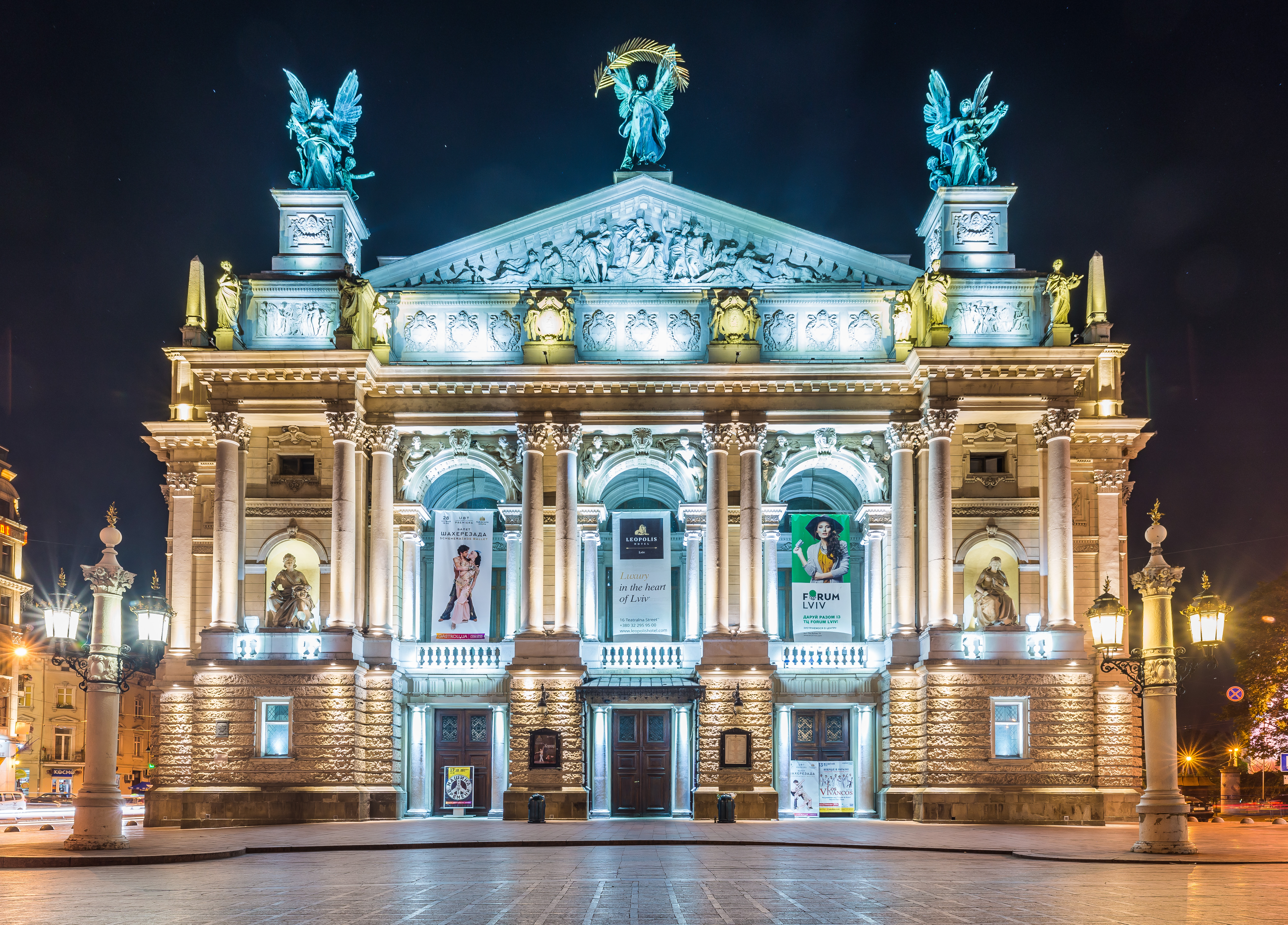
Lviv

Coat of Arms of Ukraine

This is a select bibliography of English-language books (including translations) and journal articles about the history of Ukraine.

Works listed here are cited in the notes or bibliographies of scholarly sources. Each is published by an academic or major press, written by a recognized expert, or substantially reviewed in scholarly journals; borderline cases are omitted. A selection of primary sources are included. Many of the books below carry their own bibliographies; see the Further reading section for other bibliographies, and the External links section for historical sites, academic sites, and museums.

Citations follow APA style. (Note: Entries are in plain text APA 7 format without templates; templates are used only for reviews and notes.) Book have citations to academic journal or mainstream published reviews when available. For books only partly about the subject, relevant chapter or section titles are provided when useful and available. Translators of the original-language edition are included when possible. In cases where a title or name has appeared with more than one English spelling, the most recent published form is used and a footnote documents any earlier title under which the work appeared.

== General surveys of Ukrainian history ==
- Mykhailo Hrushevsky (1898) History of Ukraine-Rusʹ vols. 1–10 (in 12 books) / Edmonton, Toronto: Canadian Institute of Ukrainian Studies Press, 1997–2014. (The Hrushevsky Translation Project).
- Magocsi, P. E., (2010). A History of Ukraine: The Land and Its Peoples. Toronto: University of Toronto Press.
- Plokhy, S. (2015). The Gates of Europe: A History of Ukraine. New York: Basic Books.
- Reid, A. (1999). Borderland. New York: Basic Books.
- Subtelny, O. (2008). Ukraine: A History (4th ed.). Toronto: University of Toronto Press.
- Szporluk, R. (1982). Ukraine: A Brief History, 2nd ed., Detroit: Ukrainian Festival Committee. LCCN 84-108082
- Wylegala, A., & Glowacka-Grajper, M. (2019). The Burden of the Past: History, Memory, and Identity in Contemporary Ukraine. Bloomington: Indiana University Press.

=== Surveys of Eurasian history ===
Works listed have substantial material and context on Ukrainian history.

- Fritz, V. (2007). State-Building: A Comparative Study of Ukraine, Lithuania, Belarus, and Russia (1st ed.). Central European University Press.
- Halperin, C. J. (2010). National Identity in Premodern Rus'. Russian History, 37(3), 275–294.

==== Russia ====
- Blum, J. (1971). Lord and Peasant in Russia from the Ninth to the Nineteenth Century. Princeton: Princeton University Press.
- Plokhy, S. (2017). Lost Kingdom: The Quest for Empire and the Making of the Russian Nation. New York: Basic Books.
- Thompson, J. M., & Ward, C. J. (2017). Russia: A Historical Introduction from Kievan Rus’ to the Present (8th edition). London, UK: Routledge.

=== Ukrainian studies ===
- Amar, T. C. (2015). The Paradox of Ukrainian Lviv: A Borderland City between Stalinists, Nazis, and Nationalists. Ithaca: Cornell University Press.
- Berezhnaya, L. (2015). A View from the Edge: Borderland Studies and Ukraine, 1991-2013. Harvard Ukrainian Studies, 34(1/4), 53–78.
- Bilenky, S. (2018). Imperial Urbanism in the Borderlands: Kyiv, 1800-1905 (Illustrated edition). Toronto: University of Toronto Press.
- Budurowycz, B. (1983). Poland and the Ukrainian Problem, 1921-1939. Canadian Slavonic Papers / Revue Canadienne Des Slavistes, 25(4), 473–500.
- Dabrowski, P. M. (2021). The Carpathians: Discovering the Highlands of Poland and Ukraine (NIU Series in Slavic, East European, and Eurasian Studies). DeKalb: Northern Illinois University Press.
- Davies, B. (2007). Warfare, State and Society on the Black Sea Steppe, 1500–1700.
- Kaminski, A. S. (1993). Republic vs. Autocracy Poland-Lithuania and Russia 1686-1697 (Harvard Series In Ukrainian Studies). Cambridge: Harvard Ukrainian Research Institute.
- Markovits, A. S., & Sysyn, F. E. (Eds.). (1982). Nationbuilding and the Politics of Nationalism: Essays on Austrian Galicia (Harvard Series In Ukrainian Studies). Cambridge: Harvard Ukrainian Research Institute.
- Rieber, A. J. (2014). The Struggle for the Eurasian Borderlands: From the Rise of Early Modern Empires to the End of the First World War. Cambridge: Cambridge University Press.
- Samokhvalov, V. (2018). Fractured Eurasian Borderlands: The Case of Ukraine. In A. Ohanyan (Ed.), Russia Abroad: Driving Regional Fracture in Post-Communist Eurasia and Beyond. Washington, D.C.: Georgetown University Press.
- Snyder, T. (2004). The Reconstruction of Nations: Poland, Ukraine, Lithuania, Belarus, 1569–1999. New Haven: Yale University Press.
- ———. (2010). Bloodlands: Europe Between Hitler and Stalin. New York: Basic Books.
- Staliūnas, D. (2007). Between Russification and Divide and Rule: Russian Nationality Policy in the Western Borderlands in mid-19th Century. Jahrbücher Für Geschichte Osteuropas, 55(3), 357–373.
- Staliūnas, D., & Aoshima, Y., (eds.). (2021). The Tsar, the Empire, and the Nation: Dilemmas of Nationalization in Russia's Western Borderlands, 1905–1915. Historical Studies in Eastern Europe and Eurasia. Budapest: Central European University Press.
- Thaden, E. (1984). Russia’s Western Borderlands, 1710-1980, Princeton, N.J.: Princeton University Press.
- Ther, P., & Kreutzmüller, C. (2014). The Dark Side of Nation-States: Ethnic Cleansing in Modern Europe. New York: Berghahn Books.
- Von, H. & Herbert J. (2011). War in a European Borderland: Occupations and Occupation Plans in Galicia and Ukraine; 1914–1918. Seattle, WA: University of Washington.

== Period histories ==
=== Ukraine before the Russian empire ===
This section includes works on Ukrainian history before the establishment of the Russian Empire.

- Barford, P. M. (2001). The Early Slavs: Culture and Society in Early Medieval Eastern Europe (1st edition). New York: Cornell University Press.
- Curta, F. (2006). Southeastern Europe in the Middle Ages, 500–1250. Cambridge, UK: Cambridge University Press.
- Dolukhanov, P. (1996). The Early Slavs: Eastern Europe from the Initial Settlement to the Kievan Rus. London, UK: Routledge.
- Halperin, C. (2010). National Identity in Premodern Rus'. Russian History, 37(3), 275–294.
- Pelenski, J. (1979). The Sack of Kiev of 1482 in Contemporary Muscovite Chronicle Writing. Harvard Ukrainian Studies, 3/4, 638–649.
- Pelenski, J. (1983). The Emergence of the Muscovite Claims to the Byzantine-Kievan "Imperial Inheritance". Harvard Ukrainian Studies, 7, 520–531.
- Plokhy, S. (2010). The Origins of the Slavic Nations: Premodern Identities in Russia, Ukraine, and Belarus. Cambridge, UK: Cambridge University Press.
- Raffensperger, C. (2016). Ties of Kinship: Genealogy and Dynastic Marriage in Kyivan Rus´ (Harvard Series In Ukrainian Studies). Cambridge: Harvard Ukrainian Research Institute.
- Raffensperger, Christian (2022). From Kyivan Rus to Ukraine: Past is Present. Stuttgart: Anton Hiersemann KG. ISBN 978-3-7772-2301-8.

=== Ukraine during the Russian empire ===
This section includes works on Ukrainian history generally after the establishment of the Russian Empire until the Russian Revolution.

- Bilenky, S. (2012). Romantic Nationalism in Eastern Europe: Russian, Polish, and Ukrainian Political Imaginations. Redwood City: Stanford University Press.
- Fisher, A. W. (1970). The Russian Annexation of the Crimea, 1772–1783. Cambridge: Cambridge University Press.
- Friesen, L. (2009). Rural Revolutions in Southern Ukraine: Peasants, Nobles, and Colonists, 1774-1905 (Harvard Series In Ukrainian Studies). Cambridge: Harvard Ukrainian Research Institute.
- Heuman, S. (1998). Kistiakovsky: The Struggle for National and Constitutional Rights in the Last Years of Tsarism (Harvard Series In Ukrainian Studies). Cambridge: Harvard Ukrainian Research Institute.
- Kappeler, A. (2001). The Russian Empire: A Multiethnic History (A. Clayton, trans.). Harlow: Longman.
- Kohut, Z. E. (1989). Russian Centralism and Ukrainian Autonomy: Imperial Absorption of the Hetmanate, 1760s–1830s (Harvard Series In Ukrainian Studies). Cambridge: Harvard Ukrainian Research Institute.
- LeDonne, J. P. (1997). The Russian Empire and the World 1700–1917: The Geopolitics of Expansion and Containment, Oxford: Oxford University Press.
- O’Neill, K. (2017). Claiming Crimea: A History of Catherine the Great’s Southern Empire. New Haven: Yale University Press.
- Subtelny, O. (1980). Russia and the Ukraine: The Difference That Peter I Made. The Russian Review, 39(1), 1–17.

=== Ukraine during the Soviet era ===
This section covers Ukrainian history from 1917–1991.

- Boriak, H., Graziosi, A., Hajda, L. A., Kessler, G., Maksudov, S., Pianciola, N., & Grabowicz, G. G. (2009). Hunger by Design: The Great Ukrainian Famine and Its Soviet Context (H. Hryn, Ed.; Illustrated edition). Cambridge: Harvard Ukrainian Research Institute.
- Bruski, J. J., & Bałuk-Ulewiczowa, T. (2016). Between Prometheism and Realpolitik: Poland and Soviet Ukraine, 1921–1926. Krakow, Poland: Jagiellonian University Press.
- Conquest, R. (1970). The Nation Killers: The Soviet Deportation of Nationalities. New York: Macmillan.
- Conquest, R. (2006). The Harvest of Sorrow: Soviet Collectivization and the Terror-Famine. London: Pimlico.
- Hagenloh, P. (2009). Stalin's Police: Public Order and Mass Repression in the USSR, 1926–1941. Washington, D.C: Woodrow Wilson Center Press.
- Himka, J.-P. (1992). Western Ukraine between the Wars. Canadian Slavonic Papers, 34(4), 391–412.
- Khlevniuk, O. (2004). The History of the Gulag: From Collectivization to the Great Terror. New Haven, CT: Yale University Press
- Liber, G. (2010). Soviet Nationality Policy, Urban Growth, and Identity Change in the Ukrainian SSR 1923-1934 (Cambridge Russian, Soviet and Post-Soviet Studies). Cambridge: Cambridge University Press.
- Liber, G. (2016). Total Wars and the Making of Modern Ukraine, 1914-1954. Toronto: University of Toronto Press.
- Mace, J. E. (1983). Communism and the Dilemmas of National Liberation: National Communism in Soviet Ukraine, 1918-1933 (Harvard Series In Ukrainian Studies). Cambridge: Harvard Ukrainian Research Institute.
- Martin, T. (1998). The Origins of Soviet Ethnic Cleansing. The Journal of Modern History, 70(4), 813–861.
- Naimark, N. M. (2012). Stalin's Genocides. Princeton: Princeton University Press.
- Pauly, M. (2014). Breaking the Tongue: Language, Education, and Power in Soviet Ukraine, 1923–1934. University of Toronto Press.
- Snyder, T. (2010). Bloodlands: Europe Between Hitler and Stalin. New York: Basic Books.
- Stachiw, M. (1969). Western Ukraine at the Turning Point of Europe's History 1918–1923. (2 vols.). New York: Shevchenko Scientific Society.
- Veryha, W. (1984). Famine in Ukraine in 1921–1923 and the Soviet Government's Countermeasures. Nationalities Papers, 12(2), 265–286.
- Von, H. & Herbert J. (2011). War in a European Borderland: Occupations and Occupation Plans in Galicia and Ukraine; 1914–1918. Seattle, WA: University of Washington.
- Wheatcroft, S. (2012). The Soviet Famine of 1946–1947, the Weather and Human Agency in Historical Perspective. Europe-Asia Studies, 64(6), 987–1005.
- Yekelchyk S. (2015). Stalin's Empire of Memory: Russian-Ukrainian Relations in the Soviet Historical Imagination. Toronto: University of Toronto Press.

==== Russian Revolution and Civil War ====
- Abramson, H. (1999). A Prayer for the Government: Ukrainians and Jews in Revolutionary Times, 1917-1920 (Harvard Series In Ukrainian Studies). Cambridge: Ukrainian Research Institute of Harvard University.
- Adams, A. E. (1963). Bolsheviks in the Ukraine: The Second Campaign, 1918–1919. New Haven: Yale University Press.
- Applebaum, A. (2017). Chapter 1: The Ukrainian Revolution, 1917. In Red Famine: Stalin's War on Ukraine. New York: Doubleday.
- Baker, M. (1999). Beyond the National: Peasants, Power, and Revolution in Ukraine. Journal of Ukrainian Studies, 24(1), 39–67.
- Baker, M. R. (2016). Peasants, Power, and Place: Revolution in the Villages of Kharkiv Province, 1914–1921 (Harvard Series In Ukrainian Studies). Cambridge: Harvard Ukrainian Research Institute.
- Betlii, O. (2019). Revolution through the Lens of Ordinary Life in Kyiv. Slavic Review, 78(4), 935–941.
- Borys, J. & Armstrong, J. A. (1980). The Sovietization of Ukraine, 1917-1923: The Communist Doctrine and Practice of National Self-Determination. Edmonton, AB: Canadian Institute of Ukrainian Studies.
- Bilous, L. (2019). Re-thinking the Revolution in Ukraine: The Jewish Experience, 1917–1921. Slavic Review, 78(4), 949–956.
- Dornik, W. (Ed.). (2022). The Emergence of Ukraine: Self-Determination, Occupation, and War in Ukraine, 1917-1922. University of Alberta Press.
- Edelman, R. (1985). Rural Proletarians and Peasant Disturbances: The Right Bank Ukraine in the Revolution of 1905. The Journal of Modern History, 57(2), 248–277.
- Fowler, M. C. (2019). Introduction: Ukraine in Revolution, 1917–1922. Slavic Review, 78(4), 931–934.
- Fowler, M. C. (2019). The Geography of Revolutionary Art. Slavic Review, 78(4), 957–964.
- Guthier, S. (1979). The Popular Base of Ukrainian Nationalism in 1917. Slavic Review, 38(1), 30–47.
- Hunczak, T. (1977). The Ukraine 1917–1921: A Study in Revolution. Cambridge: Harvard Ukrainian Research Institute.
- Kenez, P. (1971, 1977). Civil war in South Russia (2 vols.). Berkeley: University of California Press.
- Kuchabsʹkyĭ, V. & Fagan, G. (2009). Western Ukraine in Conflict with Poland and Bolshevism, 1918–1923. Toronto: Canadian Institute of Ukrainian Studies Press.
- Malle, S. (2009). The Economic Organization of War Communism 1918-1921 (Cambridge Russian, Soviet and Post-Soviet Studies). Cambridge: Cambridge University Press.
- Procyk, A. (1995). Russian Nationalism and Ukraine: The Nationality Policy of the Volunteer Army during the Civil War. Edmonton: Canadian Institute of Ukrainian Studies Press.
- Reshetar, J. S. (1952). The Ukrainian Revolution, 1917–1920, A Study in Nationalism. Princeton: NJ: Princeton University Press.
- Skirda, A. (2004). Nestor Makhno, Anarchy's Cossack: The Struggle for Free Soviets in the Ukraine 1917–1921. Edinburgh: AK Press.
- Velychenko, S. (2010). State Building in Revolutionary Ukraine: A Comparative Study of Government and Bureaucrats, 1917–22. Toronto: University of Toronto Press.
- Von, H. & Hunczak, T. (1977). The Ukraine, 1917-1921: A Study in Revolution. Cambridge: Harvard University Press.
- Yekelchyk, S. (2019). The Ukrainian Meanings of 1918 and 1919. Harvard Ukrainian Studies, 36(1/2), 73–86.
- Yekelchyk, S. (2019). Searching for the Ukrainian Revolution. Slavic Review, 78(4), 942–948.

==== World War II ====
Works listed here should have substantial information about events in Ukraine or relating to Ukrainians, not general works on World War II or the Holocaust.

- Baraban, E. V. (2014). Filming a Stalinist War Epic in Ukraine: Ihor Savchenko's "The Third Strike." Canadian Slavonic Papers / Revue Canadienne Des Slavistes, 56(1/2), 17–41.
- Bellezza, S. A. (2008). The Discourse over the Nationality Question in Nazi-Occupied Ukraine: The Generalbezirk Dnjepropetrowsk, 1941-3. Journal of Contemporary History, 43(4), 573–596.
- Berkhoff, Karel C. (2004). Harvest of Despair: Life and Death in Ukraine Under Nazi Rule. Cambridge: Harvard University Press. doi:10.2307/j.ctv1p6hnvg. ISBN 978-0-674-02718-3. JSTOR j.ctv1p6hnvg.
- Boshyk, Yuri (1986). Ukraine during World War II. History and its aftermath. Downsview: University of Toronto Press. ISBN 0-920862-36-5.
- Gerhard, G. (2009). Food and Genocide: Nazi Agrarian Politics in the Occupied Territories of the Soviet Union. Contemporary European History, 18(1), 45–65.
- Hunczak, Taras; Shtohryn, Dmytro, eds. (2003). Ukraine. The Challenges of World War II. Lanham: University Press of America. ISBN 0-7618-2637-8.
- Kiebuzinski, K., & Motyl, A. (Eds.). (2017). The Great West Ukrainian Prison Massacre of 1941: A Sourcebook. Amsterdam: Amsterdam University Press.
- Kosyk, Wolodymyr (1991). The Third Reich and the Ukrainian Question. Document 1934-1944. London: Ukrainian Central Information Service. ISBN 0-902322-39-7.
- Lower, Wendy (2005). Nazi Empire Building and the Holocaust in the Ukraine. Chapel Hill: University of North Carolina Press. ISBN 0-8078-2960-9.
- Markiewicz, P. (2021). Unlikely Allies: Nazi German and Ukrainian Nationalist Collaboration in the General Government During World War II. West Lafayette: Purdue University Press.
- Marples, David R. (1985). "Western Ukraine and Western Belorussia Under Soviet Occupation: The Development of Socialist Farming, 1939-1941". Canadian Slavonic Papers. 27 (2): 158–177. doi:10.1080/00085006.1985.11091799.
- Piotrowski, T. (Ed.). (2008). Genocide and Rescue in Wolyn: Recollections of the Ukrainian Nationalist Ethnic Cleansing Campaign Against the Poles During World War II. Jefferson: McFarland & Company.
- Rudling, Per Anders (2012). "'They Defended Ukraine': The 14. Waffen-Grenadier-Division der SS (Galizische Nr. 1) Revisited". The Journal of Slavic Military Studies. 25 (3): 329–368. doi:10.1080/13518046.2012.705633.
- Shkandrij, Myroslav (2023). In the Maelstrom: The Waffen-SS "Galicia" Division and Its Legacy. Montreal and Kingstone: McGill-Queen's University Press. ISBN 978-0-228-01653-3.
- Snyder, T. (1999). “To Resolve the Ukrainian Problem Once and for All”: The Ethnic Cleansing of Ukrainians in Poland, 1943–1947. Journal of Cold War Studies, 1(2), 86–120.
- Snyder, T. (2003). The Ethnic Cleansing of Western Ukraine (1939–1945). In The Reconstruction of Nations: Poland, Ukraine, Lithuania, Belarus, 1569–1999 (pp. 154–178). New Haven: Yale University Press.
- Snyder, Timothy (2003). "The Causes of Ukrainian-Polish Ethnic Cleansing 1943" (PDF). Past & Present (179): 197–234. doi:10.1093/past/179.1.197.
- Steinhart, Eric (2015). The Holocaust and the Germanization of Ukraine. Publications of the German Historical Institute. Oxford: Oxford University Press. doi:10.1017/CBO9781107447783. ISBN 978-1107659452.
- Ther, P., & Kreutzmüller, C. (2014). The Dark Side of Nation-States: Ethnic Cleansing in Modern Europe. New York: Berghahn Books.

===== Holocaust =====
- Bartov, Omar (2008). "Eastern Europe as the Site of Genocide". The Journal of Modern History. 80 (3): 557–593. doi:10.1086/589591.
- Berkhoff, K. C., & Carynnyk, M. (1999). The Organization of Ukrainian Nationalists and Its Attitude toward Germans and Jews: Iaroslav Stets’Ko’s 1941 Zhyttiepys. Harvard Ukrainian Studies, 23(3/4), 149–184.
- Dean, Martin C. (1996). "The German Gendarmerie, the Ukrainian Schutzmannschaft and the 'Second Wave' of Jewish Killings in Occupied Ukraine: German Policing at the Local Level in the Zhitomir Region, 1941-1944". German History. 14 (2): 168–192. doi:10.1093/gh/14.2.168.
- Dean, M. (1999). Collaboration in the Holocaust: Crimes of the Local Police in Belorussia and Ukraine, 1941-44. New York: Palgrave Macmillan.
- Dean, Martin Christopher (2022). "Forced Labor Camps for Jews in Reichskommissariat Ukraine: The Exploitation of Jewish Labor within the Holocaust in the East". Eastern European Holocaust Studies. 1: 175–196. doi:10.1515/eehs-2022-0002. ISSN 2749-9030.
- Goldenshteyn, M. (2022). So They Remember: A Jewish Family’s Story of Surviving the Holocaust in Soviet Ukraine. Norman: University of Oklahoma Press.
- Himka, John-Paul (2009). Ukrainians, Jews and the Holocaust: Divergent Memories. Saskatoon: Heritage Press. ISBN 978-0-88880-554-6.
- Himka, John-Paul (2012). "Ukrainian Memories of the Holocaust: The Destruction of Jews as Reflected in Memoirs Collected in 1947". Canadian Slavonic Papers. 54 (3–4): 427–442. doi:10.1080/00085006.2012.11092716.
- Himka, J.-P. (2011). The Lviv Pogrom of 1941: The Germans, Ukrainian Nationalists, and the Carnival Crowd. Canadian Slavonic Papers / Revue Canadienne Des Slavistes, 53(2/4), 209–243.
- Himka, John-Paul (2021). Ukrainian Nationalists and the Holocaust: OUN and UPA's Participation in the Destruction of Ukrainian Jewry, 1941–1944. Stuttgart: ibidem. ISBN 978-3-8382-1548-8.
- Katchanovski, I. (2010). The Politics of Soviet and Nazi Genocides in Orange Ukraine. Europe-Asia Studies', 62(6), 973–997.
- Lower, Wendy (2002). "A New Ordering of Space and Race: Nazi Colonial Dreams in Zhytomyr, Ukraine, 1941-1944". German Studies Review. 25 (2): 227–254. doi:10.2307/1432991. JSTOR 1432991.
- Lower, Wendy (2005). Nazi Empire Building and the Holocaust in the Ukraine. Chapel Hill: University of North Carolina Press. ISBN 0-8078-2960-9.
- Lower, Wendy; Brandon, Ray (2010). The Shoah in Ukraine: History, Testimony, Memorialization. Bloomington: Indiana University Press. ISBN 978-0253222688.
- Lower, W. (2012). Axis Collaboration, Operation Barbarossa, and the Holocaust in Ukraine. In A. J. Kay, J. Rutherford, & D. Stahel (Eds.), Nazi Policy on the Eastern Front, 1941: Total War, Genocide, and Radicalization (pp. 186–219). Woodbridge: Boydell & Brewer.
- Markiewicz, P. (2021). Unlikely Allies: Nazi German and Ukrainian Nationalist Collaboration in the General Government During World War II. West Lafayette: Purdue University Press.
- Mc Bride, Jared (2016). "Peasants into Perpetrators: The OUN-UPA and the Ethnic Cleansing of Volhynia, 1943–1944". Slavic Review. 75 (3): 630–654. doi:10.5612/slavicreview.75.3.0630.
- Podol’s’kyi, A., & Lang, S. (2008). A Reluctant Look Back: Jewry and the Holocaust in Ukraine. Osteuropa, 58(8/10), 271–278.
- Pohl, Dieter (1996). Nationalsozialistische Judenverfolgung in Ostgalizien 1941 - 1944. Organisation und Durchführung eines staatlichen Massenverbrechens [National Socialist Persecution of Jews in Eastern Galicia 1941 - 1944. Organization and Execution of a State-sanctioned Mass Murder] (in German). Munich: Oldenbourgh. doi:10.1524/9783486706505. ISBN 3-486-56233-9.
- Rudling, Per Anders (2011). The OUN, the UPA and the Holocaust: A Study in the Manufacturing of Historical Myths. ISSN 0889-275X.
- Steinhart, Eric (2015). The Holocaust and the Germanization of Ukraine. Publications of the German Historical Institute. Oxford: Oxford University Press. doi:10.1017/CBO9781107447783. ISBN 978-1107659452.
- Zabarko, Boris (2004). Holocaust in the Ukraine (Library of Holocaust Testimonies ed.). Elstree: Vallentine Mitchell & Co Ltd. ISBN 978-0853036128.

===== Military history =====
- Buttar, P. (2018). On a Knife's Edge: The Ukraine, November 1942-March 1943. Oxford: Osprey Publishing.
- ————. (2019). Retribution: The Soviet Reconquest of Central Ukraine, 1943. Oxford: Osprey Publishing.
- ————. (2020). The Reckoning: The Defeat of Army Group South, 1944. Oxford: Osprey Publishing.
- Stahel, D. (2012). Kiev 1941: Hitler's Battle for Supremacy in the East. Cambridge: Cambridge University Press.

=== Independent Ukraine ===
This section covers Ukrainian history from 1991—present.

- Aslund, A., & McFaul, M. (2006). Revolution in Orange: The Origins of Ukraine's Democratic Breakthrough. New York: Carnegie Endowment for International Peace.
- Birch, S. (2000). Elections and Democratization in Ukraine. New York: Macmillan.
- Ivan Katchanovski, Fukuyama, F., & Umland, A. (2014). Cleft Countries—Regional Political Divisions and Cultures in Post-Soviet Ukraine and Moldova. Germany: Stuttgart Ibidem.
- Kuzio, T. (2015). Contemporary Ukraine: Dynamics of Post-Soviet Transformation. London: Routledge.
- Kuzio, T. (2016). Ukraine State and Nation Building. London Routledge.

==== The Russo-Ukraine war ====
This section primarily covers the period from 2014–present.

- Brands, H. (Ed.). (2024). War in Ukraine: Conflict, Strategy, and the Return of a Fractured World. Johns Hopkins University Press.
- Clark, E., & Vovk, D. (Eds.). (2020). Religion During the Russian Ukrainian Conflict. New York: Routledge.
- D'Anieri, P. (2019). Ukraine and Russia: From Civilized Divorce to Uncivil War. Cambridge: Cambridge University Press.
- Galeotti, M. (2019). The Armies of Russia's War in Ukraine. Osprey. (Osprey Elite Series).
- Grigas, A. (2016). Beyond Crimea: The New Russian Empire. New Haven: Yale University Press.
- Grzebyk, Patrycja; Uczkiewicz, Dominika, eds. (2025). The Russian-Ukrainian Conflict and War Crimes Challenges for Documentation and International Prosecution. Abingdon. doi:10.4324/9781003493785. ISBN 978-1-032-79770-0.
- Hansen, A., Rogatchevski, A., Steinholt, Y., & Wickström, D. (2019). A War of Songs: Popular Music and Recent Russia-Ukraine Relations. Stuttgart: ibidem-Verlag; distributed by Columbia University Press.
- Menon, R., Rumer, E. B., & Chasman, D. (2015). Conflict in Ukraine: The Unwinding of the Post–Cold War Order. MIT Press.
- Plokhy, S. (2023) The Russo-Ukrainian War: The Return of History. W. W. Norton.
- Wood, E., Pomeranz, W., Merry, E. W., & Trudolyubov, M. (2015). Roots of Russia’s War in Ukraine. New York: Woodrow Wilson Center Press and Columbia University Press.

== Regional studies ==
=== Black Sea ===
- Under construction

=== Crimea ===
- Başer, A. (2019). Conflicting Legitimacies in the Triangle of the Noghay Hordes, Crimean Khanate, and Ottoman Empire. Harvard Ukrainian Studies, 36(1/2), 105–122.
- Figes, O. (2010). Crimea. London: Metropolitan Books.
- Fisher, A. W. (1970). The Russian Annexation of the Crimea 1772–1783. Cambridge: Cambridge University Press.
- Klein, D. (2012). The Crimean Khanate between East and West. Wiesbaden: Harrassowitz Verlag.
- Kolodziejczyk, D. (2011). The Crimean Khanate and Poland-Lithuania (Annotated edition). Lieden: Brill Publishers.
- Mosse, W. E. (1963). The Rise and Fall of the Crimean System 1855–71: The Story of a Peace Settlement. New York: Macmillan.
- O’Neill, K. (2017). Claiming Crimea: A History of Catherine the Great’s Southern Empire. New Haven: Yale University Press.
- Rayfield, Donald (2024). 'A Seditious and Sinister Tribe': The Crimean Tatars and their Khanate. London: Reaktion Books.
- Sasse, G. (2007). The Crimea Question: Identity, Transition, and Conflict (Harvard Series In Ukrainian Studies). Cambridge: Harvard Ukrainian Research Institute.

=== Donbas ===
- Under construction

== Topical histories ==
=== Arts and culture ===
- Blacker, U. (2022). Managing the Arts in Soviet Ukraine. Kritika: Explorations in Russian and Eurasian History, 23(2), 389-399.
- Czaplicka, J. (Ed.). (2005). Lviv: A City in the Crosscurrents of Culture (Harvard Series In Ukrainian Studies). Cambridge: Harvard Ukrainian Research Institute.
- Grabowicz, G. G. (1981). Toward a History of Ukrainian Literature (Harvard Series In Ukrainian Studies). Cambridge: Harvard Ukrainian Research Institute.
- Ilnytzkyj, O. S. (1998). Ukrainian Futurism, 1914–1930: A Historical and Critical Study (Harvard Series In Ukrainian Studies). Cambridge: Harvard Ukrainian Research Institute.
- Makaryk, I., & Tkacz, V. (2015). Modernism in Kyiv: Jubilant Experimentation. Toronto: University of Toronto Press.
- Martynowych, O. T. (2014). The Showman and the Ukrainian Cause: Folk Dance, Film, and the Life of Vasile Avramenko. Winnipeg: University of Manitoba Press.
- Natan M. M. (2006). Jews, Ukrainians, and Russians in Kiev: Intergroup Relations in Late Imperial Associational Life. Slavic Review, 65(3), 475–501.
- Raffensperger, Christian (2022). Treasures of Ukraine: a nation's cultural heritage. London; New York: Thames & Hudson. ISBN 978-0-500-02603-8. OCLC 1327835684.
- Shkandrij, M. (2001). Russia and Ukraine: Literature and the Discourse of Empire from Napoleonic to Postcolonial Times. Montreal & Kingston: McGill-Queen's Press.

==== Customs, traditions, and folklore ====
- Martynowych, O. T. (2014). The Showman and the Ukrainian Cause: Folk Dance, Film, and the Life of Vasile Avramenko. Winnipeg: University of Manitoba Press.

=== Chernobyl ===
- Aleksievič, S., & Gessen, K. (2005). Voices From Chernobyl: The Oral History of a Nuclear Disaster. Chicago: Dalkey Archive Press.
- Fialkova, L. (2001). Chornobyl's Folklore: Vernacular Commentary on Nuclear Disaster. Journal of Folklore Research, 38(3), 181–204.
- Fairlie, I. (2007). Dispersal, deposition and collective doses after the Chernobyl disaster. Medicine, Conflict and Survival, 23(1), 10–30.
- Geist, E. (2015). Political Fallout: The Failure of Emergency Management at Chernobyl. Slavic Review, 74(1), 104–126.
- Gould, P. (1998). Fire in the Tain: The Democratic Consequences of Chernobyl. Baltimore, MD: Johns Hopkins University Press.
- Higginbotham, A. (2019). Midnight in Chernobyl: The Untold Story of the World's Greatest Nuclear Disaster. Simon & Schuster.
- Kalmbach, K. (2013). Radiation and Borders: Chernobyl as a National and Transnational Site of Memory. Global Environment, 6(11), 130–159.
- Kapitza, S. (1993). Lessons of Chernobyl: The Cultural Causes of the Meltdown. Foreign Affairs, 72(3), 7–11.
- Marples, D. R. (1990). The Social Impact of the Chernobyl Disaster. New York: Macmillan.
- Marples, D. R. (1986). Chernobyl and Nuclear Power in the USSR. Macmillan.
- Medvedev, G. (1991). The Truth About Chernobyl. New York: Basic Books.
- Medvedev, Z. A. (1979). Nuclear Disaster in the Urals (G. Saunders, Trans.). W. W. Norton.
- Medvedev, Z. A. (1990). The Legacy of Chernobyl. New York: W. W. Norton & Co.
- Nichols, Kenneth (1987). The Road to Trinity: A Personal Account of how America's Nuclear Policies were Made. New York: William Morrow and Company. pp. 363–380. ISBN 0-688-06910-X. OCLC 15223648.
- Nichols, K. D. (1987). The road to Trinity: A personal account of how America's nuclear policies were made (pp. 363–380). William Morrow.
- Petryna, A. (2002). Life Exposed: Biological Citizens after Chernobyl. Princeton University Press.
- Plokhy, S. (2018). Chernobyl: The History of a Nuclear Catastrophe. New York: Basic Books.
- Potter, W. C. (1991). The impact of Chernobyl on nuclear power safety in the Soviet Union. Studies in Comparative Communism, 24(2), 191–210.
- Read, P. P. (1993). Ablaze: The Story of the Heroes and Victims of Chernobyl. New York: Random House.
- Potter, W. C. (1991). The impact of Chernobyl on nuclear power safety in the Soviet Union. Studies in Comparative Communism, 24(2), 191–210.
- Schmid, S. D. (2015). Producing Power: The Pre-Chernobyl History of the Soviet Nuclear Industry. MIT Press.
- Tchertkoff, W. (2016). The Crime of Chernobyl: The Nuclear Gulag. London: Glagoslav Publications.
- Woodwell, G. M. (1986). Chernobyl: A technology that failed. Issues in Science and Technology, 3(1), 30–31, 33–35.

=== Cossacks ===
- O'Rourke, S. (2008). The Cossacks. Manchester: Manchester University Press.
- Dmytro Yavornytsky, History of the Zaporizhian Cossacks.
  - Yavornytsky, Dmytro Ivanovych (1990) [1892]. Історія запорозьких козаків. Том 1 [History of the Zaporizhian Cossacks. Volume 1] (in Ukrainian). Kyiv: Naukova Dumka. p. 596. ISBN 5-12-001243-4. (general overview of the territory of the Cossacks, their organisation and way of life)
  - Yavornytsky, Dmytro Ivanovych (1990) [1895]. Історія запорозьких козаків. Том 2 [History of the Zaporizhian Cossacks. Volume 2] (in Ukrainian). Kyiv: Naukova Dumka. p. 566. ISBN 5-12-002051-8. (history until 1686)
  - Yavornytsky, Dmytro Ivanovych (1993) [1897]. Історія запорозьких козаків. Том 3 (1686–1734) [History of the Zaporizhian Cossacks. Volume 3 (1686–1734)] (PDF) (in Ukrainian). Kyiv: Naukova Dumka. p. 588. ISBN 5-12-002052-6. (history until 1734)
- Yavornytsky, Dmytro Ivanovych (2005). Твори у 20 томах. Том 2: Вільності запорізьких козаків: історико-топографічний нарис [Works in 20 Volumes. Volume 2: The Freedoms of the Zaporizhian Cossacks: a Historical and Topographical Essay] (PDF) (in Ukrainian). Kyiv/Zaporizhzhia: Tandem-U. p. 384. ISBN 966-7482-48-0.
- Yavornytsky, Dmytro Ivanovych (2008). Твори у 20 томах. Том 3, Книга 1: Джерела до історії запорозьких козаків [Works in 20 Volumes. Volume 3, Book 1: Sources on the history of the Zaporizhian Cossacks] (PDF) (in Ukrainian). Kyiv/Zaporizhzhia: Tandem-U. p. 497. ISBN 978-966-7482-95-4.

=== Economics ===
- Koropeckyj, I. S. (Ed.). (1991). Ukrainian Economic History: Interpretive Essays (Illustrated edition) (Harvard Series In Ukrainian Studies). Cambridge: Harvard Ukrainian Research Institute.
- Siedenberg, Axel; Hoffmann, Lutz, eds. (1999). Ukraine at the Crossroads. Economic Reforms in International Perspective. Heidelberg: Physica. doi:10.1007/978-3-642-58666-8. ISBN 978-3-7908-1189-6.

=== Famine ===
- Andriewsky, O. (2015). "Towards a Decanted History: The Study of the Holodomor and Ukrainian Historiography". East/West: Journal of Ukrainian Studies, 2(1).
- Applebaum, A. (2017). Red Famine: Stalin's War on Ukraine. New York: Doubleday.
- Bertelsen, O. (2017). Starvation and Violence amid the Soviet Politics of Silence, 1928–1929. Genocide Studies International, 11(1), 38–67.
- Bertelsen, O. (2018). “Hyphenated” Identities during the Holodomor: Women and Cannibalism. In E. Bemporad & J. W. Warren (Eds.), Women and Genocide: Survivors, Victims, Perpetrators (pp. 77–96). Bloomington: Indiana University Press.
- Bojko D. et al. (2009) Holodomor : the Great Famine in Ukraine 1932-1933. Institute of National Remembrance, Commission of the Prosecution of Crimes against the Polish Nation
- Boriak, H., Graziosi, A., Hajda, L. A., Kessler, G., Maksudov, S., Pianciola, N., & Grabowicz, G. G. (2009). Hunger by Design: The Great Ukrainian Famine and Its Soviet Context (H. Hryn, Ed.; Illustrated edition). Cambridge: Harvard Ukrainian Research Institute.
- Cairns, A. (1989). The Soviet Famine, 1932-33: An Eye-witness Account of Conditions in the Spring and Summer of 1932.
- Czech, M., & Hnatiuk, O. (2021). Reactions to the 1932–33 Holodomor by Ukrainians in interwar Europe: new discoveries and sources. Ukraina Moderna, 30–31, 325–343.
- Dalrymple, D. G. (1964). The Soviet famine of 1932–1934. Soviet Studies, 15(3), 250–284.
- Davies, R. W., & Wheatcroft, S. G. (2009). The Years of Hunger: Soviet Agriculture, 1931–1933. London: Macmillan.
- Dewhirst, M. (1990). The Foreign Office and the famine: British documents on Ukraine and the Great Famine of 1932–1933. International Affairs, 66(1), 171–172.
- Dolot, M. (1990). Execution by Hunger: The Hidden Holocaust. New York: W.W. Norton.
- Ellman, M. (2007). Stalin and the Soviet Famine of 1932-33 Revisited. Europe-Asia Studies, 59(4), 663–693.
- Gamache, R. (2020). Contextualizing FDR’s Campaign to Recognize the Soviet Union, 1932–1933: Propaganda, Famine Denial, and Ukrainian Resistance. Harvard Ukrainian Studies, 37(3/4), 287–322.
- Grynevych, L. (2008). "The Present State of Ukrainian Historiography on the Holodomor and Prospects for Its Development". The Harriman Review, 16(2), 10–20.
- Hryshko, V.I. (1983). The Ukrainian Holocaust of 1933
- Kardash, P. (2007). Genocide in Ukraine
- Katchanovski, I. (2010). The Politics of Soviet and Nazi Genocides in Orange Ukraine. Europe-Asia Studies', 62(6), 973–997.
- Kulchytsky, S. (2018). The famine of 1932-1933 in Ukraine: An anatomy of the Holodomor.
- Kusnierz R., (2008). The Impact of the Great Famine on Ukrainian Cities: Evidence from the Polish Archives.
- Kuromiya H., (2021). The Holodomor in the Light of Japanese Documents
- Kurt I. (Dr.), (1933). Hungerpredigt. Deutsche Notbriefe aus der Sowjet-Union.
- Klid, B., & Motyl, A. J. (Eds.). (2012). The Holodomor Reader: A Sourcebook on the Famine of 1932–1933 in Ukraine. Toronto: Canadian Institute of Ukrainian Studies Press.
- Luckyj, G. S. N. (1987). Keeping a record : literary purges in Soviet Ukraine (1930s), a bio-bibliography
- Makuch, A., Sysyn, F. (Eds.), Sysyn, F. (2015). Contextualizing the Holodomor: The impact of thirty years of Ukrainian famine studies. Edmonton & Toronto: Canadian Institute of Ukrainian Studies Press.
- Melnyczuk, L. (2012). Silent memories, traumatic lives: Ukrainian Migrant Refugees in Western Australia.
- Naimark, N. M. (2012). Stalin's Genocides. Princeton: Princeton University Press.
- (2004). Vernichtung durch Hunger: Der Holodomor in der Ukraine und der UdSSR (Extermination by hunger: the Holodomor in Ukraine and the USSR), special issue on the Holodomor of Osteuropa (Stuttgart), 54(12).
- Serbyn, R., & Krawchenko, B. (1986). Famine in Ukraine, 1932-1933. Canadian Institute of Ukrainian Studies University of Alberta.
- Solovei D., Shumeyko S., (1953). The Golgotha of Ukraine. Eye-witness accounts of the famine in Ukraine instigated and fostered by the Kremlin in an attempt to quell Ukrainian resistance to Soviet Russian
- Plyushch, V. (1973) Genocide of the Ukrainian People. The Artificial Fomilne ln the Year 1932-1933.

=== Gulag, ethnic cleansing and terror ===
- Hagenloh, P. (2009). Stalin's Police: Public Order and Mass Repression in the USSR, 1926–1941. Washington, D.C: Woodrow Wilson Center Press.
- Himka, J.-P. (2011). The Lviv Pogrom of 1941: The Germans, Ukrainian Nationalists, and the Carnival Crowd. Canadian Slavonic Papers / Revue Canadienne Des Slavistes, 53(2/4), 209–243.
- Kis, O. (2021). Survival as Victory: Ukrainian Women in the Gulag (L. Wolanskyj, Trans.) (Harvard Series in Ukrainian Studies). Cambridge: Harvard University Press.
- Martin, T. (1998). The Origins of Soviet Ethnic Cleansing. The Journal of Modern History, 70(4), 813–861.
- McBride, J. (2016). Peasants into Perpetrators: The OUN-UPA and the Ethnic Cleansing of Volhynia, 1943–1944. Slavic Review, 75(3), 630–654.
- Shearer, D. R. (2001). Social Disorder, Mass Repression, and the NKVD during the 1930S. Cahiers Du Monde Russe, 42(2/4), 505–534.
- Snyder, T. (1999). To Resolve the Ukrainian Problem Once and for All: The Ethnic Cleansing of Ukrainians in Poland, 1943–1947. Journal of Cold War Studies, 1(2), 86–120.
- Snyder, T. (2003). The Causes of Ukrainian-Polish Ethnic Cleansing 1943. past & Present, 179, 197–234.

=== Language ===
- Danylenko, A. (2017). The “Doubling of Hallelujah” for the “Bastard Tongue”: The Ukrainian Language Question in Russian Ukraine, 1905-1916. Harvard Ukrainian Studies, 35(1/4), 59–86.
- Remy, J. (2017). Against All Odds: Ukrainian in the Russian Empire in the Second Half of the Nineteenth Century. Harvard Ukrainian Studies, 35(1/4), 43–58.
- Shapoval, Y., & Olynyk, M. D. (2017). The Ukrainian Language under Totalitarianism and Total War. Harvard Ukrainian Studies, 35(1/4), 187–212.
- Shevelov, G. Y. (1989). The Ukrainian Language in the First Half of the Twentieth Century (Harvard Series In Ukrainian Studies). Cambridge: Harvard Ukrainian Research Institute.
- Yefimenko, H., & Olynyk, M. D. (2017). Bolshevik Language Policy as a Reflection of the Ideas and Practice of Communist Construction, 1919-1933. Harvard Ukrainian Studies, 35(1/4), 145–167.

=== Gender and family ===
- Bertelsen, O. (2018). “Hyphenated” Identities during the Holodomor: Women and Cannibalism. In E. Bemporad & J. W. Warren (Eds.), Women and Genocide: Survivors, Victims, Perpetrators (pp. 77–96). Bloomington: Indiana University Press.
- Fábián, K., & Korolczuk, E. (Eds.). (2017). Rebellious Parents: Parental Movements in Central-Eastern Europe and Russia. Indiana University Press.
- Kis, O. (2021). Survival as Victory: Ukrainian Women in the Gulag (L. Wolanskyj, Trans.). Cambridge: Harvard Ukrainian Research Institute.
- Tomiak, J. (1992). Education in the Baltic States, Ukraine, Belarus’ and Russia. Comparative Education, 28(1), 33–44.

=== Sexual orientation ===
- Under construction

=== Human rights ===
- Under construction

=== Nationalism ===
- Berkhoff, K. C., & Carynnyk, M. (1999). The Organization of Ukrainian Nationalists and Its Attitude toward Germans and Jews: Iaroslav Stets’Ko’s 1941 Zhyttiepys. Harvard Ukrainian Studies, 23(3/4), 149–184.
- Dornik, W. (Ed.). (2022). The Emergence of Ukraine: Self-Determination, Occupation, and War in Ukraine, 1917-1922. University of Alberta Press.
- Gomza, I. (2015). Elusive Proteus: A study in the ideological morphology of the Organization of Ukrainian Nationalists. Communist and Post-Communist Studies, 48(2/3), 195–207.
- Liber, G. O. (2016). The Ukrainian Movements in Poland, Romania, and Czechoslovakia, 1918–1939. In Total Wars and the Making of Modern Ukraine, 1914-1954 (pp. 81–108). University of Toronto Press.
- Magocsi, Paul (2002). The Roots of Ukrainian Nationalism: Galicia as Ukraine's Piedmont. University of Toronto Press. ISBN 9780802047380.
- Markiewicz, P. (2021). Unlikely Allies: Nazi German and Ukrainian Nationalist Collaboration in the General Government During World War II. West Lafayette: Purdue University Press.
- Marples, David R. (2007). Heroes and Villains: Creating National History in Contemporary Ukraine. Central European University Press. p. 386. ISBN 978-963-7326-98-1.
- Motyl, Alexander J. (1980). The Turn to the Right: The Ideological Origins and Development of Ukrainian Nationalism, 1919-1929, (East European Monographs, no. 65; 1980). ISBN (PDF). New York: Columbia University Press. ISBN 978-0-91471-058-5.
- Prizel, I. (2009). National Identity and Foreign Policy: Nationalism and Leadership in Poland, Russia and Ukraine (Cambridge Russian, Soviet and Post-Soviet Studies). Cambridge: Cambridge University Press.
- Rossoliński-Liebe, Grzegorz (2011). "The 'Ukrainian National Revolution' of 1941. Discourse and Practice of a Fascist Movement". Kritika: Explorations in Russian and Eurasian History. 12 (1): 83–114. doi:10.1353/kri.2011.a411661.
- Rossoliński-Liebe, Grzegorz (2012). "Debating, Obfuscating and Disciplining the Holocaust: Post-Soviet Historical Discourses on the OUN-UPA and other Nationalist Movements". East European Jewish Affairs. 42 (3): 199–241. doi:10.1080/13501674.2012.730732.
- Rossoliński-Liebe, Gregorz (2014). Stepan Bandera: The Life and Afterlife of a Ukrainian Nationalist. Fascism, Genocide, and Cult. Stuttgart: Ibidem Press. ISBN 978-3-8382-0604-2.
- Rossoliński-Liebe, Grzegorz (2015). The Fascist Kernel of Ukrainian Genocidal Nationalism. The Carl Beck Papers in Russian and East European Studies. Vol. 2402. Pittsburgh: The Center for Russian and East European Studies. doi:10.5195/cbp.2015.204..
- Rossoliński-Liebe, G. (2019). Inter-Fascist Conflicts in East Central Europe: The Nazis, the “Austrofascists,” the Iron Guard, and the Organization of Ukrainian Nationalists. In G. Rossoliński-Liebe & A. Bauerkämper (Eds.), Fascism without Borders: Transnational Connections and Cooperation between Movements and Regimes in Europe from 1918 to 1945 (1st ed., pp. 168–191). Berghahn Books.
- Rudling, Per Anders (2014). Tarnished Heroes: The Organization of Ukrainian Nationalists in the Memory Politics of Post-Soviet Ukraine. Hannover: ibidim. ISBN 978-3-8382-0999-9.
- Shkandrij, M. (2015). Ukrainian Nationalism: Politics, Ideology, and Literature, 1929-1956. New Haven: Yale University Press.
- Snyder, Timothy (2003). The Reconstruction of Nations: Poland, Ukraine, Lithuania, Belarus, 1569–1999 (PDF). New Haven, CT: Yale University Press. p. 384. ISBN 978-0-300-12841-3.
- Wilson, Andrew (1996). Ukrainian Nationalism in the 1990s: A Minority Faith. Cambridge: Cambridge University Press. ISBN 0-521-57457-9.

=== Nuclear disarmament ===
- Kostenko, Y., & D’Anieri, P. (2021). Ukraine’s Nuclear Disarmament: A History (S. Krasynska, L. Wolanskyj, & O. Jennings, Trans.). Cambridge: Harvard Ukrainian Research Institute.

=== Orange Revolution ===
- Under construction

=== Religion and philosophy ===
- Bartal, I., & Polonsky, A. (Eds.). (1999). Polin: Studies in Polish Jewry Volume 12: Focusing on Galicia: Jews, Poles and Ukrainians 1772-1918. Liverpool: Liverpool University Press.
- Clucas, L. (Ed.). (1988). The Byzantine Legacy in Eastern Europe Boulder, CO: East European Monographs.
- Frick, D. (1995). Meletij Smotryc’kyj. Cambridge: Harvard University Press.
- Kivelson, V. A., & Worobec, C. D. (Eds.). (2020). Witchcraft in Russia and Ukraine, 1000–1900: A Sourcebook (NIU Series in Slavic, East European, and Eurasian Studies). DeKalb: Northern Illinois University Press.
- Gudziak, B. A. (2001). Crisis and Reform: The Kyivan Metropolitanate, the Patriarchate of Constantinople, and the Genesis of the Union of Brest (Harvard Series In Ukrainian Studies). Cambridge: Harvard Ukrainian Research Institute.
- Kulik, A. (2023). Jews in Old Rus´: A Documentary History (Harvard Series In Ukrainian Studies). Cambridge: Harvard Ukrainian Research Institute.
- Shepard, J. (2017). The Expansion of Orthodox Europe: Byzantium, the Balkans and Russia. London, UK: Routledge.
- Worobec, C. D. (1995). Witchcraft Beliefs and Practices in Prerevolutionary Russian and Ukrainian Villages. The Russian Review, 54(2), 165–187.

=== Rural and agricultural history ===
- Friesen, L. (2009). Rural Revolutions in Southern Ukraine: Peasants, Nobles, and Colonists, 1774-1905 (Harvard Series In Ukrainian Studies). Cambridge: Harvard Ukrainian Research Institute.

=== Urban and industrial history ===
- Amar, T. C. (2015). The Paradox of Ukrainian Lviv: A Borderland City between Stalinists, Nazis, and Nationalists. Ithaca: Cornell University Press.
- Bilenky, S. (2018). Imperial Urbanism in the Borderlands: Kyiv, 1800-1905 (Illustrated edition). Toronto: University of Toronto Press.
- Czaplicka, J. (Ed.). (2005). Lviv: A City in the Crosscurrents of Culture (Harvard Series In Ukrainian Studies). Cambridge: Harvard Ukrainian Research Institute.
- Herlihy, P. (1991). Odessa: A History, 1794–1914 (Harvard Series In Ukrainian Studies). Cambridge: Harvard Ukrainian Research Institute.
- Mick, C. (2011). Incompatible Experiences: Poles, Ukrainians and Jews in Lviv under Soviet and German Occupation, 1939-44. Journal of Contemporary History, 46(2), 336–363.
- Natan M. M. (2006). Jews, Ukrainians, and Russians in Kiev: Intergroup Relations in Late Imperial Associational Life. Slavic Review, 65(3), 475–501.
- Ther, P., & Czaplicka, J. (2000). War versus Peace: Interethnic Relations in Lviv during the First Half of the Twentieth Century. Harvard Ukrainian Studies, 24, 251–284

== Biographies ==
- Erlacher, T. (2021). Ukrainian Nationalism in the Age of Extremes: An Intellectual Biography of Dmytro Dontsov (Harvard Series In Ukrainian Studies). Cambridge: Harvard Ukrainian Research Institute.
- Frick, D. (1995). Meletij Smotryc’kyj. Cambridge: Harvard University Press.
- Prymak, Thomas M. (1987). Mykhailo Hrushevsky: The Politics of National Culture . Toronto: University of Toronto Press.
- Prymak, Thomas M. (1993). Mykola Kostomarov: A Biography (Toronto: University of Toronto Press)
- Sysyn, F. (1985). Between Poland and the Ukraine: The Dilemma of Adam Kysil. Cambridge: Harvard University Press.
- Zaitsev, Pavlo, (1988) Taras Shevchenko: A Life, trans. George S. N. Luckyj (Toronto: University of Toronto Press)

=== Volodymyr Zelenskyy ===
Works below should strictly follow the guidelines for this bibliography. To avoid abuse, works here should have independent English language academic reviews or reviews by major English language publications (e.g. New York Times, The Atlantic).

- Under construction

Works by Volodymyr Zelenskyy

- War Speeches, Volodymyr Zelenskyy (7 book series), lmverlag Berlin.
  - War Speeches I: February–March 2022
  - War Speeches II: April 2022
  - War Speeches III: May 2022
  - War Speeches IV: June, 2022
  - War Speeches V : July, 2022
  - War Speeches VI: August 2022
  - War Speeches VII: September 2022

== Historiography, identity, and memory studies ==
=== Historiography ===
- Jilge, W. (2006). The Politics of History and the Second World War in Post-Communist Ukraine (1986/1991-2004/2005). Jahrbücher Für Geschichte Osteuropas, 54(1), 50–81.
- Kappeler, A. (2017). Ungleiche Brüder: Russen und Ukrainer vom Mittelalter bis zur Gegenwart. [Unequal Brothers: Russians and Ukrainians from the Middle Ages to the Present]. Munich: Verlag C. H. Beck. ISBN 978-3406714108.
- Kasianov, G., Ther, P. (Eds.). (2009). A Laboratory of Transnational History: Ukraine and Recent Ukrainian Historiography. Budapest and New York: Central European University Press. ISBN 978-963-9776-26-5.
- Kasianov, G., Tolochko, O., & Olynyk, M. D. (2015). National Histories and Contemporary Historiography: The Challenges and Risks of Writing a New History of Ukraine. Harvard Ukrainian Studies, 34(1/4), 79–104.
- Miller, D. (1986). The Kievan Principality in the Century before the Mongol Invasion: An Inquiry into Recent Research and Interpretation. Harvard Ukrainian Studies, 10(1/2), 215–240.
- Plokhy, S. (2021). "Quo Vadis Ukrainian History?" The Frontline: Essays on Ukraine’s Past and Present (Harvard Series In Ukrainian Studies). Cambridge: Harvard Ukrainian Research Institute.
- Plokhy, S. (Ed.). (2016). The Future of the Past: New Perspectives on Ukrainian History. Cambridge MA: Harvard University Press. ISBN 9781932650167.
- Rudnytsky, I. (1963). "The Role of the Ukraine in Modern History". Slavic Review, 22(2), 199–216. doi:10.2307/3000671.
- von Hagen, M. (1995). "Does Ukraine Have a History". Slavic Review, 54(3), 658–673. doi:10.2307/2501741.
- Vushko, I. (2015). Empire, Nation, and In-Between: Ukrainian Historiography. Harvard Ukrainian Studies, 34(1/4), 297–311.
- Wolff, L. (2006). Revising Eastern Europe: Memory and the Nation in Recent Historiography. The Journal of Modern History, 78(1), 93–118.

=== Identity ===
- Burant, S. R. (1995). Foreign Policy and National Identity: A Comparison of Ukraine and Belarus. Europe-Asia Studies, 47(7), 1125–1144.
- Delwaide, J. (2011). Identity and Geopolitics: Ukraine’s Grappling with Imperial Legacies. Harvard Ukrainian Studies, 32/33, 179–207.
- Graziosi, A. (2015). Viewing the Twentieth Century through the Prism of Ukraine: Reflections on the Heuristic Potential of Ukrainian History. Harvard Ukrainian Studies, 34(1/4), 107–128.
- Khanenko-Friesen, N. (2015). Ukrainian Otherlands: Diaspora, Homeland, and Folk Imagination in the Twentieth Century (1st edition). Madison: University of Wisconsin Press.
- Kravchenko, V. (2015). Fighting Soviet Myths: The Ukrainian Experience. Harvard Ukrainian Studies, 34(1/4), 447–484.
- Prizel, I. (2009). National Identity and Foreign Policy: Nationalism and Leadership in Poland, Russia and Ukraine (Cambridge Russian, Soviet and Post-Soviet Studies). Cambridge: Cambridge University Press.

=== Memory studies ===
- Himka, J.-P. (2012). Ukrainian Memories of the Holocaust: The Destruction of Jews as Reflected in Memoirs Collected in 1947. Canadian Slavonic Papers / Revue Canadienne Des Slavistes, 54(3/4), 427–442.
- Jilge, W., & Troebst, S. (2006). Divided Historical Cultures? World War II and Historical Memory in Soviet and post-Soviet Ukraine: Introduction. Jahrbücher Für Geschichte Osteuropas, 54(1), 1–2.
- Khromeychuk, Olesya (2013). Undetermined' Ukrainians. Post-War Narratives of the Waffen SS 'Galicia' Division. Nationalisms across the Globe. Vol. 11. Peter Lang. doi:10.3726/978-3-0353-0476-3. ISBN 9783034308748.
- Marples, David R. (2007). Heroes and Villains: Creating National History in Contemporary Ukraine. Central European University Press. p. 386. ISBN 978-963-7326-98-1.
- Myshlovska, Oksana (2018). "Establishing the "Irrefutable Facts" about the OUN and UPA: The Role of the Working Group of Historians on OUN-UPA Activities in Mediating Memory-based Conflict in Ukraine". Ab Imperio. 2018 (1): 223–254. doi:10.1353/imp.2018.0008.
- Perks, R. (1993). Ukraine’s Forbidden History: Memory and Nationalism. Oral History, 21(1), 43–53.
- Rossoliński-Liebe, Grzegorz (2010). "Celebrating Fascism and War Criminality in Edmonton. The Political Myth and Cult of Stepan Bandera in Multicultural Canada". Kakanien Revisited. 12: 1–16.
- Rossoliński-Liebe, Grzegorz (2012). "Debating, Obfuscating and Disciplining the Holocaust: Post-Soviet Historical Discourses on the OUN-UPA and other Nationalist Movements". East European Jewish Affairs. 42 (3): 199–241. doi:10.1080/13501674.2012.730732.
- Rossoliński-Liebe, Grzegorz (2015). "Remembering and Forgetting the Past: Jewish and Ukrainian Memories of the Holocaust in western Ukraine". Yad Vashem Studies. 43 (2): 13–50.
- Rossoliński-Liebe, Grzegorz (2016). "Holocaust Amnesia: The Ukrainian Diaspora and the Genocide of the Jews". German Yearbook of Contemporary History. 1: 107–144. doi:10.1353/gych.2016.0006.
- Rossoliński-Liebe, Grzegorz (2022). "Ukrainian Nationalists and the Jews during the Holocaust in the Eyes of Anticommunist, Soviet, German, Jewish, Polish, and Ukrainian Historians: Transnational History and National Interpretations". Moreshet. 19: 341–371.
- Rudling, Per Anders (2016). "The Cult of Roman Shukhevych in Ukraine: Myth Making with Complications". Fascism. 5 (1): 26–65. doi:10.1163/22116257-00501003.
- Shevel, O. (2016). The Battle for Historical Memory in Postrevolutionary Ukraine. Current History, 115(783), 258–263.
- Wylegala, A., & Glowacka-Grajper, M. (2019). The Burden of the Past: History, Memory, and Identity in Contemporary Ukraine. Bloomington: Indiana University Press.

== Other works ==
- Emeran, C. (2017). New Generation Political Activism in Ukraine: 2000–2014. London: Routledge.
- Hartley, J. M. (2021). The Volga: A History. New Haven: Yale University Press.
- Himka, J.P. (1983). Socialism in Galicia: The Emergence of Polish Social Democracy and Ukrainian Radicalism (Harvard Series In Ukrainian Studies). Cambridge: Harvard Ukrainian Research Institute.
- Kappeler, A., Kohut, Z. E., Sysyn, F. E., & von Hagen, M. (Eds.). (2003). Culture, nation, and identity: the Ukrainian-Russian encounter, 1600–1945. Toronto: Canadian Institute of Ukrainian Studies Press.
- Magocsi, P. R., Petrovsky-Shtern, Y. (2018). Jews and Ukrainians: A Millennium of Co-Existence. Toronto: University of Toronto Press. ISBN 978-0-7727-5111-9.
- Palko, O., & Ardeleanu, C. (Eds.). (2022). Making Ukraine: Negotiating, Contesting, and Drawing the Borders in the Twentieth Century. Montreal: Mcgill-Queen’s University Press.
- Plokhy, S. (2021). The Frontline: Essays on Ukraine’s Past and Present (Harvard Series In Ukrainian Studies). Cambridge: Harvard Ukrainian Research Institute.
- Zavorotna, N. (2020). Scholars in Exile: The Ukrainian Intellectual World in Interwar Czechoslovakia. Toronto: University of Toronto Press.

=== Journalism ===
- Aseyev, S. (2022). In Isolation: Dispatches from Occupied Donbas. Harvard library of Ukrainian literature.
- Miller, C. (2023). The War Came To Us: Life and Death in Ukraine. Bloomsbury.
- Zhadan, S. (2023). Sky Above Kharkiv: Dispatches from the Ukrainian Front. Yale University Press.
- Kurkov, A. (2014). Ukraine Diaries: Dispatches from Kiev. Harvill Press.

== Reference works ==
=== Early Slavs ===
- Kievan Rus. (2016). Encyclopedia Britannica.
- Auty, R., Obolensky, D., et al. (2010). Companion to Russian studies (Vol. 1, An introduction to Russian history; Vol. 2, Russian language and literature; Vol. 3, An introduction to Russian art and architecture). Cambridge University Press.
- Barnes, I., & Lieven, D. (2015). Restless empire: A historical atlas of Russia (Illustrated ed.). Belknap Press.
- Brown, A., et al. (1982). The Cambridge encyclopedia of Russia and the Soviet Union. Cambridge University Press.
- Channon, J., & Hudson, R. (1995). The Penguin historical atlas of Russia. Penguin.
- Gilbert, M. (2007). The Routledge atlas of Russian history (4th ed.). Routledge.
- Katchanovski, I., Kohut, Z. E., Nebesio, B. Y., & Yurkevich, M. (2013). Historical dictionary of Ukraine (2nd ed.). Scarecrow Press.
- Langer, L. N. (2001). Historical dictionary of medieval Russia. The Scarecrow Press.
- Lerski, H. (1996). Historical dictionary of Poland, 966–1945. Greenwood Publishing.
- Magocsi, P. R. (2017). Carpathian Rus': A historical atlas. University of Toronto Press.
- Millar, J. R. (Ed.). (2004). Encyclopedia of Russian history (4 vols.). Macmillan Library Reference.
- Wieczynski, J. L., et al. (Eds.). (1976–). The modern encyclopedia of Russian and Soviet history. Academic International Press.

=== Ukraine ===
- Encyclopedia of Ukraine (University of Toronto Press, 1984–1993) 5 vol; partial online version, from Canadian Institute of Ukrainian Studies

== English language translations of primary sources ==
- Heifetz, E. (1921). The Slaughter of the Jews in the Ukraine in 1919. Text

Works by Volodymyr Zelenskyy

- War Speeches, Volodymyr Zelenskyy (7 book series), lmverlag Berlin.
  - War Speeches I: February–March 2022
  - War Speeches II: April 2022
  - War Speeches III: May 2022
  - War Speeches IV: June, 2022
  - War Speeches V : July, 2022
  - War Speeches VI: August 2022
  - War Speeches VII: September 2022

== Bibliographies ==
=== Books ===
Below are recent works from mainstream and academic publishers which contain bibliographies of Ukrainian history.

- Further Reading appendix in Plokhy, S. (2015). The Gates of Europe: A History of Ukraine. New York: Basic Books.

=== Online ===
Below are online bibliographies of Ukrainian history from historical associations and academic institutions.

- Berkhoff, K. C. (1997). Ukraine under Nazi Rule (1941-1944): Sources and Finding Aids: Part I. Jahrbücher Für Geschichte Osteuropas, 45(1), 85–103.
- ———. (1997). Ukraine under Nazi Rule (1941-1944): Sources and Finding Aids Part II. Jahrbücher Für Geschichte Osteuropas, 45(2), 273–309.

=== Primary sources ===
- Boriak, H. (2001). The Publication of Sources on the History of the 1932–1933 Famine-Genocide: History, Current State, and Prospects. Harvard Ukrainian Studies, 25(3/4), 167–186.
- Dalrymple, D. G. (1965). The Soviet Famine of 1932-1934; Some Further References. Soviet Studies, 16(4), 471–474.

== See also ==
- Outline of Ukraine
- Bibliography of the history of the Early Slavs and Rus'
- Bibliography of Russian history (1223–1613)
- Bibliography of Russian history (1613–1917)
- Bibliography of the Russian Revolution and Civil War
- Bibliography of Stalinism and the Soviet Union
- Bibliography of the Soviet Union during World War II
- Bibliography of the Post Stalinist Soviet Union
- Bibliography of the history of Poland
