= Borys Zabarko =

Ukrainian historian

Borys Mykhaylovych Zabarko (born 18 November 1935) is a Ukrainian historian and president of the Ukrainian Association of Survivors of Concentration camps and Ghettos.

== Life ==
Zabarko survived the ghetto of Sharhorod as a child. After the Second World War he studied at the Chernivtsi University, and did his PhD at the Institute for History at the National Academy of Sciences of Ukraine in Kiev, where he received a PhD in 1971. From 1969 until 1988, he worked as a research assistant at the Institute for History and from 1971 until 1991 he was a member of the Soviet–German Commission of Historians. He worked as a research assistant at the Institute for Global Economy and International Relations of the National Academy of Sciences of Ukraine from 1989 until 2002.

Zabarko is the author of about 200 books and articles, published in Israel, Austria, Russia, Czechoslovakia, Ukraine and Hungary. In Germany, a book series on the Shoah in Ukraine and a remembrance book, published by himself, were released. Furthermore, he is the initiator of a record–keeping project about antisemitic writings and violent crimes in Ukraine. Since 1998 he is the director of the Institute for Social and Parish Workers and since 2004, he has also been the president of the Ukrainian association of former Jewish prisoners of ghetto and Nazi concentration camps.

On 21 October 2009, he was awarded the Order of Merit of the Federal Republic of Germany. He was the seventh Ukrainian to do so.

== Published works ==
- Holocaust in the Ukraine. London, Vallentine Mitchell, 2005.
- Life in the shadow of death. Recent memories about the Holocaust in Ukraine; vol 1 – 2. Melitopol: Publishing house of Melitopol, 2019.
