= Wladimir Tchertkoff =

Italian journalist

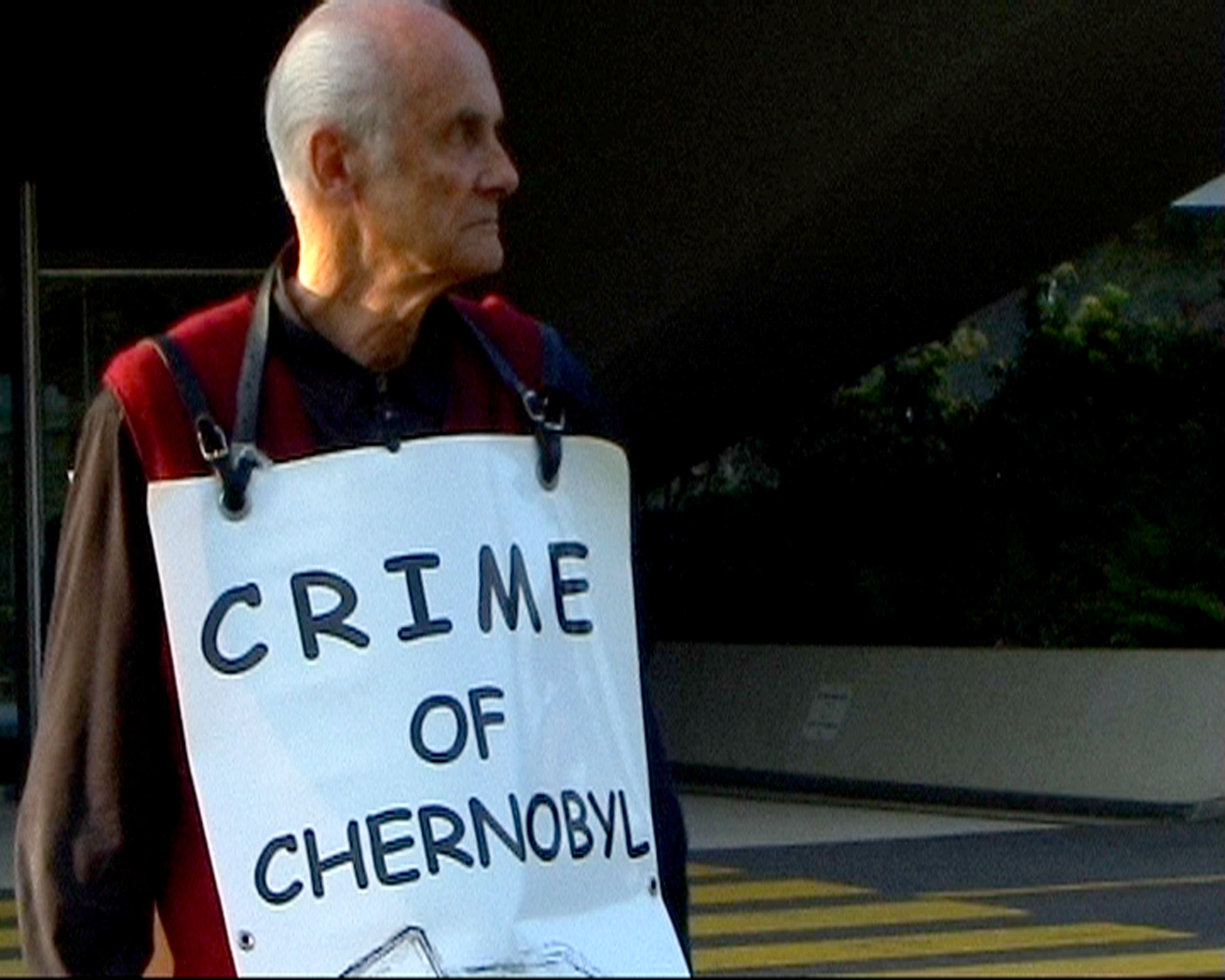
Wladimir Tchertkoff in front of the WHO building, asking for a modification of the WHO-IAEA agreement in 2007

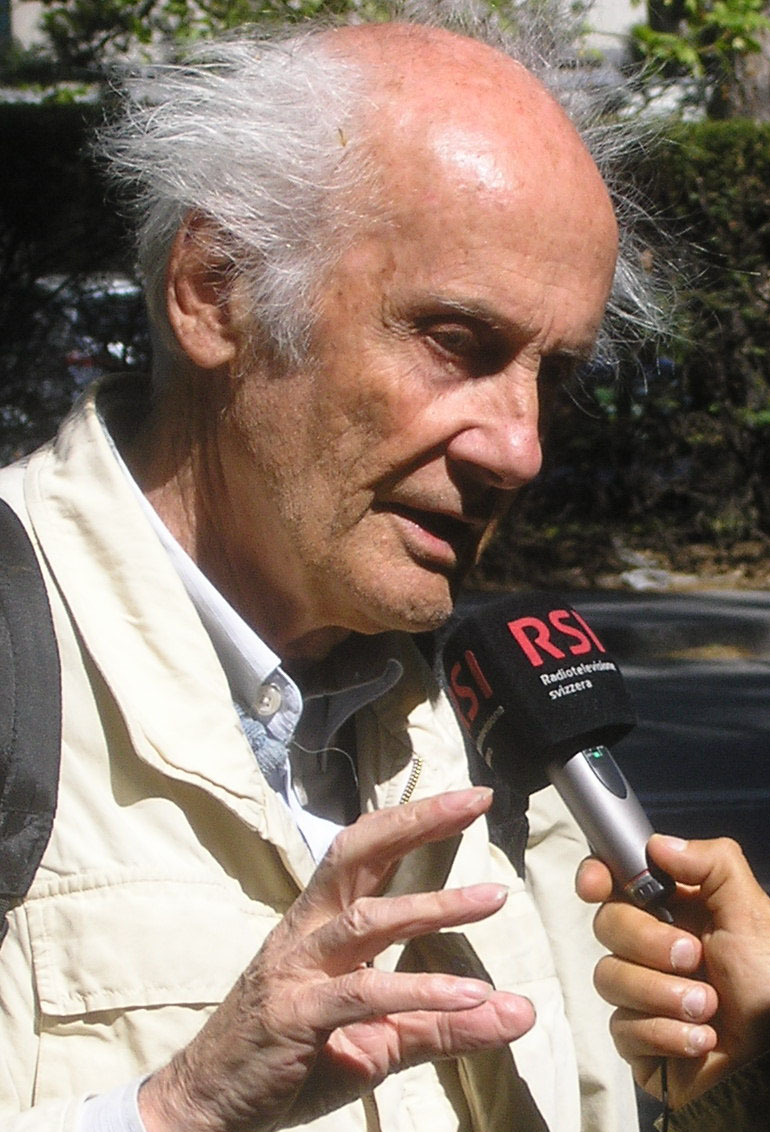
Tchertkoff in 2011

Wladimir Tchertkoff (1935 – 9 April 2023) was an Italian journalist.

He was born in Yugoslavia to Russian-born parents. He released with Emanuela Andreoli in 2003 the film The Sacrifice, a documentary on the liquidators of the Chernobyl nuclear power plant. This film received an award from the Île-de-France council for the best scientific and environment documentary in November 2004.

He has also received the award of the best documentary of the Festival of Scientific Movies of Oullins, France.

Tchertkoff is the author of Le Crime de Tchernobyl, le Goulag nucléaire (The Crime of Chernobyl, the Nuclear Goulag) published by Actes Sud, Paris.

He was also one of the founders of the organisation Children of Chernobyl Belarus.

== Filmography ==
- (in French) The Atomic Trap (Le Piège atomique) (see online). 47 mn Documentary (1998).

== Bibliography ==
- (in French) Wladimir Tchertkoff, Le Crime de Tchernobyl, le Goulag nucléaire, Actes Sud, April 2006 ISBN 2-7427-6042-3
- Wladimir Tchertkoff, The Crime of Chernobyl: The Nuclear Goulag, translated by Susie Greaves, Glagoslav Publications, March 2016 ISBN 978-1-78437-931-5
