= Bibliography of Stalinism and the Soviet Union =

This is a select bibliography of post-World War II English-language books (including translations) and journal articles about Stalinism, Joseph Stalin, and the Stalinist era of Soviet history.

Stephen Kotkin's biography of Stalin has an extensive bibliography; Stalin: Paradoxes of Power, 1878–1928 contains a 52-page bibliography and Stalin: Waiting for Hitler, 1929–1941 contains a 50-page bibliography covering both the life of Stalin and Stalinism in the Soviet Union. (Note: For information about Kotkin's Stalin biography, see entries in Biographies section.)

Works listed here are cited in the notes or bibliographies of scholarly sources. Each is published by an academic or major press, written by a recognized expert, or substantially reviewed in scholarly journals; borderline cases are omitted. A selection of primary sources are included. Many of the books below carry their own bibliographies; see the Further reading section for other bibliographies, and the External links section for historical sites, academic sites, and museums.

Citations follow APA style. (Note: Entries are in plain text APA 7 format without templates; templates are used only for reviews and notes.) Book have citations to academic journal or mainstream published reviews when available. For books only partly about the subject, relevant chapter or section titles are provided when useful and available. Translators of the original-language edition are included when possible. In cases where a title or name has appeared with more than one English spelling, the most recent published form is used and a footnote documents any earlier title under which the work appeared.

== About ==
=== Inclusion criteria ===
The period covered is 1924–1953, beginning approximately with the death of Lenin and ending approximately with the death of Stalin. This bibliography does not include the de-Stalinisation period. (Note: For a bibliography of the de-Stalinisation period, please see Bibliography of the Post Stalinist Soviet Union.)

Topics include the post-Lenin period of Stalin's consolidation of power from 1924 to 1926 and closely related topics; for works on the Soviet involvement in World War II, see Bibliography of the Soviet Union during World War II. Biographies of prominent individuals associated with the Stalinist era and the expansion of Stalinism during the immediate post World War II era. This bibliography does not include fiction, newspaper articles (expect in references), photo collections, or films created during or about Stalinism or the Stalinist Era.

Works included are referenced in the notes or bibliographies of scholarly secondary sources or journals. Included works should either be published by an academic or widely distributed publisher, be authored by a notable subject matter expert as shown by scholarly reviews and have significant scholarly journal reviews about the work. To keep the bibliography length manageable, only items that clearly meet the criteria should be included.

=== Citation style ===
This bibliography uses APA style citations. Entries do not use templates. References to reviews and notes for entries do use citation templates. Where books which are only partially related to Russian history are listed, the titles for chapters or sections should be indicated if possible, meaningful, and not excessive.

If a work has been translated into English, the translator should be included and a footnote with appropriate bibliographic information for the original language version should be included.

When listing works with titles or names published with alternative English spellings, the form used in the latest published version should be used and the version and relevant bibliographic information noted if it previously was published or reviewed under a different title.

== Overviews of Russian history ==
General works on Russian history which have significant context for Russian history in general or content about this bibliography's timeframe of history.

- Acton, E. (1995). Russia: The tsarist and Soviet legacy (2nd ed.). Longman.
- Ascher, A. (2017). Russia: A short history (3rd rev. ed.). Oneworld Publications.
- Auty, R., & Obolensky, D. D. (Eds.). (1976–1981). Companion to Russian studies (3 vols.). Cambridge University Press.
- Bartlett, R. P. (2005). A history of Russia (Macmillan Essential Histories). Palgrave Macmillan.
- Billington, J. H. (1966). The icon and the axe: An interpretive history of Russian culture. Alfred A. Knopf.
- Blackwell, W. L. (1994). The industrialization of Russia: A historical perspective (3rd ed.). Harlan Davidson.
- Blum, J. (1961). Lord and peasant in Russia from the ninth to the nineteenth century. Princeton University Press.
- Bogatyrev, S. (Ed.). (2004). Russia takes shape: Patterns of integration from the Middle Ages to the present. Finnish Academy of Science and Letters.
- Borrero, M. (2004). Russia: A reference guide from the Renaissance to the present. Facts on File.
- Boterbloem, K. (2018). A history of Russia and its empire: From Mikhail Romanov to Vladimir Putin (2nd ed.). Rowman & Littlefield.
- Boterbloem, K. (2020). Russia as empire: Past and present. Reaktion Books.
- Breyfogle, N., Schrader, A., & Sunderland, W. (Eds.). (2007). Peopling the Russian periphery: Borderland colonization in Eurasian history. Routledge.
- Bushkovitch, P. (2011). A concise history of Russia. Cambridge University Press.
- Chatterjee, C. (2022). Russia in world history: A transnational approach. Bloomsbury Academic.
- Cherniavsky, M. (Ed.). (1970). The structure of Russian history: Interpretive essays. Random House.
- Christian, D. (1998–2018). A history of Russia, Central Asia and Mongolia (2 vols.). Blackwell; Wiley-Blackwell.
- Clarkson, J. D. (1969). A history of Russia (2nd ed.). Random House.
- Connolly, R. (2020). The Russian economy: A very short introduction. Oxford University Press.
- Dmytryshyn, B. (Ed.). (1991). Medieval Russia: A source book, 850–1700 (3rd ed.). Holt, Rinehart and Winston.
- Dmytryshyn, B. (1977). A history of Russia. Prentice-Hall.
- Dukes, P. (1998). A history of Russia: Medieval, modern, contemporary, c. 882–1996 (3rd ed.). Duke University Press.
- Evtuhov, C., Goldfrank, D., Hughes, L., & Stites, R. (2004). A history of Russia: Peoples, legends, events, forces. Houghton Mifflin.
- Figes, O. (2022). The story of Russia. Metropolitan Books.
- Forsyth, J. (1992). A history of the peoples of Siberia: Russia's North Asian colony 1581–1990. Cambridge University Press.
- Freeze, G. L. (Ed.). (2009). Russia: A history (3rd ed.). Oxford University Press.
- Gleason, A. (Ed.). (2009). A companion to Russian history (Wiley-Blackwell Companions to World History). Wiley-Blackwell.
- Grousset, R. (1970). The empire of the steppes: A history of Central Asia (N. Walford, Trans. (Note: Original-language edition: Grousset, R. (1939). L'empire des steppes: Attila, Gengis-Khan, Tamerlan. Payot. Walford's translation was made from the revised 1952 French edition.)). Rutgers University Press.
- Hosking, G. (1997). Russia: People and empire, 1552–1917. Harvard University Press.
- Hosking, G. (2001). Russia and the Russians: A history. Harvard University Press.
- Kochan, L., & Abraham, R. (1983). The making of modern Russia (2nd ed.). Penguin Books.
- Lieven, D. (2000). Empire: The Russian empire and its rivals. John Murray.
- Lieven, D., Perrie, M., & Suny, R. (Eds.). (2006). The Cambridge history of Russia (3 vols.). Cambridge University Press. (Note: The Cambridge History of Russia: Volume 1, From early Rus' to 1689; Volume 2, Imperial Russia, 1689–1917; Volume 3, The twentieth century.)
- Longworth, P. (2005). Russia: The once and future empire from pre-history to Putin. St. Martin's Press.
- Mazour, A. G. (1962). Russia: Tsarist and communist. Van Nostrand.
- Moss, W. G. (1997–2005). A history of Russia (2 vols.; 2nd ed., 2003–2005). Anthem Press.
- Pares, B. (1953). A history of Russia (definitive ed.). Alfred A. Knopf.
- Pipes, R. (1974). Russia under the old regime. Charles Scribner's Sons.
- Poe, M. T. (2003). The Russian moment in world history. Princeton University Press.
- Riasanovsky, N. V., & Steinberg, M. D. (2025). A history of Russia (10th ed.). Oxford University Press.
- Shubin, D. H. (2005). A history of Russian Christianity (4 vols.). Algora Publishing.
- Sumner, B. H. (1943). A short history of Russia. Reynal & Hitchcock.
- Vernadsky, G. (1943–1969). A history of Russia (5 vols.). Yale University Press. (Note: Vernadsky's five volumes are as follows: Vol. 1: Ancient Russia (1943); Vol. 2: Kievan Russia (1948); Vol. 3: The Mongols and Russia (1953); Vol. 4: Russia at the dawn of the modern age (1959); Vol. 5: The tsardom of Moscow, 1547–1682 (2 parts, 1969).)
- Vernadsky, G. (1961). A history of Russia (6th rev. ed.). Yale University Press.
- Ward, C. J., & Thompson, J. M. (2021). Russia: A historical introduction from Kievan Rus' to the present (9th ed.). Routledge.
- Wren, M. C., & Stults, T. (2009). The course of Russian history (5th ed.). Waveland Press.

== General surveys of Soviet history ==
These works contain significant overviews of the Stalinist era.

- Cohen, S. F. (2011). Rethinking the Soviet Experience: Politics and History since 1917. New York: Oxford University Press.
- Figes, O. (2015). Revolutionary Russia, 1891–1991. New York: Metropolitan Books.
- Heller, M., Nekrich, A. M., & Carlos, P. B. (1986). Utopia in Power: The History of the Soviet Union from 1917 to the present. New York: Simon and Schuster.
- Hosking, G. (1987). The First Socialist Society: A History of the Soviet Union from Within (Second Edition). Cambridge: Harvard University Press.
- Kort, M. G. (2019). The Soviet Colossus (8th Edition). London: Routledge.
- Kenez, P. (2017). A History of the Soviet Union from the Beginning to its Legacy. New York: Cambridge University Press.
- Lewin, M. (2016). The Soviet Century. (G. Elliot, Ed.). New York: Verso.
- Malia, M. (1995). Soviet Tragedy: A History of Socialism in Russia 1917–1991. New York: Free Press.
- Mccauley, M. (2007). The Rise and Fall of the Soviet Union. London: Routledge.
- Nove, A. (1993). An Economic History of the USSR 1917–1991 (3rd Edition). London: Arkana Publishing.
- Suny, R. G. (Ed.). (2006). The Cambridge History of Russia: Volume 3, The Twentieth Century. Cambridge: Cambridge University Press. (Note: Contains a 60 page scholarly select bibliography of works relating to the history of the Soviet Union.)
- ——. (2013). The Structure of Soviet History: Essays and Documents (2nd ed.). New York: Oxford University Press.

== Period surveys and monographs (1924–1953) ==
- Angotti, T. (1988). The Stalin Period: Opening up History. Science & Society, 52(1), 5–34.
- Antonov-Ovseenko, A. (1983). The Time of Stalin: Portrait of a Tyranny. New York: Harper & Row.
- Armstrong, J. A. (1961). The Politics of Totalitarianism : The Communist Party of the Soviet Union from 1934 to the Present. New York: Random House.
- Hoffmann, D. L. (2018). The Stalinist Era. Cambridge: Cambridge University Press.
- Kuromiya, H. (2007). Stalin and His Era. The Historical Journal, 50(3), 711–724.
- McCagg, W. O. (1978). Stalin Embattled: 1943–1948. Detroit, MI: Wayne State University Press.
- Pipes, R. (1997, orig. ed. 1954). The Formation of the Soviet Union: Communism and Nationalism 1917–1923, Revised Edition. Cambridge: Harvard University Press.
- Shearer, D. (2018). Stalin at War, 1918–1953: Patterns of Violence and Foreign Threat. Jahrbücher Für Geschichte Osteuropas, 66(2), 188–217.
- Smith, S. A. (2017). Russia in Revolution: An Empire in Crisis, 1890 to 1928 (Chapters 5–7). New York: Oxford University Press.
- Smele, J. (2016). The "Russian" Civil Wars, 1916–1926: Ten Years That Shook the World (Chapter 6 and Conclusion). New York: Oxford University Press.
- Snyder, T., & Brandon, R. (Eds.). (2014). Stalin and Europe: Imitation and Domination, 1928-1953. Oxford: Oxford University Press.
- Tucker, R. C. (1992). Stalin in Power: The Revolution from Above, 1928–1941. New York: Norton.

=== Postwar era ===
- Hahn, W. G. (1982). Postwar Soviet Politics: The Fall of Zhdanov and the Defeat of Moderation, 1946–53. Ithaca: Cornell University Press.
- Kirschenbaum, L. (2011). Remembering and Rebuilding: Leningrad after the Siege from a Comparative Perspective. Journal of Modern European History, 9(3), 314–327.
- Ruble, B. (1983). The Leningrad Affair and the Provincialization of Leningrad. The Russian Review, 42(3), 301–320.
- Werth, A., & Salisbury, H. E. (1971). Russia: The Postwar Years. London: Hale.
- White, E. (2007). After the War Was over: The Civilian Return to Leningrad. Europe-Asia Studies, 59(7), 1145–1161.
- Zubkova, Elena. (2004). The Soviet Regime and Soviet Society in the Postwar Years: Innovations and Conservatism, 1945–1953. Journal of Modern European History, 2(1), 134–152.

== Social history ==
- Bettelheim, C., & Pearce, B. (1978). Class Struggles in the USSR: Second Period 1923–1930. New York: Monthly Review Press.
- Campeanu, P., & Vale, M. (1988). The Genesis of the Stalinist Social Order. International Journal of Sociology, 18(1/2), 1–165.
- Caroli, D., & Williams, R. (2003). Bolshevism, Stalinism, and Social Welfare (1917–1936). International Review of Social History, 48(1), 27–54.
- Cohen, S. F. (1986). Stalin's Terror As Social History. The Russian Review, 45(4), 375–384.
- Davies, S. (1997). "Us against Them": Social Identity in Soviet Russia, 1934–41. The Russian Review, 56(1), 70–89.
- ———. (1999). Popular Opinion in Stalin's Russia: Terror, Propaganda and Dissent, 1934–1941. Cambridge: Cambridge University Press.
- Edele, M. (2011). Stalinist Society: 1928–1953. New York: Oxford University Press.
- ———. (2014). The New Soviet Man as a "Gypsy": Nomadism, War, and Marginality in Stalin's Time. Region, 3(2), 285–307.
- Figes, O. (2008). The Whisperers: Private Life in Stalin's Russia. New York: Picador.
- Fitzpatrick, S. (1979). Stalin and the Making of a New Elite, 1928–1939. Slavic Review, 38(3), 377–402.
- ———. (1984). The Russian Revolution and Social Mobility: A Re-examination of the Question of Social Support for the Soviet Regime in the 1920s and 1930s. Politics & Society, 13(2), 119–141.
- ———. (1989). War and Society in Soviet Context: Soviet Labor before, during, and after World War II. International Labor and Working-Class History, (35), 37–52.
- ———. (1999). Everyday Stalinism: Ordinary Life in Extraordinary Times: Soviet Russia in the 1930s. New York: Oxford University Press.
- Galmarini, M. (2016). The Right to Be Helped: Deviance, Entitlement, and the Soviet Moral Order (NIU Series in Slavic, East European, and Eurasian Studies). DeKalb: Northern Illinois University Press.
- Ginsburgs, G. (1957). The Soviet Union and the Problem of Refugees and Displaced Persons 1917– 1956. The American Journal of International Law, 51(2), 325–361.
- Hoffmann, D. L. (2011). Cultivating the Masses: Modern State Practices and Soviet Socialism, 1914–1939. Ithaca: Cornell University Press.
- Kiaer, C. (2008). Everyday Life in Early Soviet Russia: Taking the Revolution Inside. Bloomington, IN: Indiana University Press.
- Lewin, M. (1976) Society and the Stalinist State in the Period of the Five Year Plans. Social History, 1(2), 139–175.
- ———. (1994). The Making of the Soviet System: Essays in the Social History of Interwar Russia. New York: New Press.
- Lorimer, F. (1979). The Population of the Soviet Union: History and Prospects. New York: AMS Press.
- Mawdsley, E., & White, S. (2004). The Soviet Elite from Lenin to Gorbachev: The Central Committee and Its Members, 1917–1991. Oxford: Oxford University Press.
- Noskova, O. G. (1996) The Social History of Industrial Psychology in Russia. Journal of Russian & East European Psychology, 34(4), 8–25.
- Nove, A. (1983). The Class Nature of the Soviet Union Revisited. Soviet Studies, 35(3), 298–312.
- Siegelbaum, L. H. (1994). Soviet State and Society Between Revolutions, 1918–1929. Cambridge: Cambridge University Press.
- Weiner, A. (1999). Nature, Nurture, and Memory in a Socialist Utopia: Delineating the Soviet Socio-Ethnic Body in the Age of Socialism. The American Historical Review, 104(4), 1114–1155.
- Yekelchyk, S. (2014). Stalin's Citizens: Everyday Politics in the Wake of Total War. Oxford: Oxford University Press.
- Zubkova, E., & Ragsdale, H. (2015). Russia After The War: Hopes, Illusions, and Disappointments, 1945–1957. London: Routledge.

=== Culture ===
Soviet Socialist Realism

- Anderson, J (2018). The Spatial Cosmology of the Stalin Cult: Ritual, Myth and Metanarrative. University of Glasgow.
- Barber, J. (1981). Soviet Historians in Crisis, 1928–1932. London: Macmillan.
- Baraban, E. V. (2014). Filming a Stalinist War Epic in Ukraine: Ihor Savchenko's "The Third Strike." Canadian Slavonic Papers / Revue Canadienne Des Slavistes, 56(1/2), 17–41.
- Baumgartner, M. and Buehler, K. (2017). The Revolution is Dead - Long Live the Revolution: From Malevich to Judd, From Deineka to Bartana. New York: Prestel/Random House.
- Clark, K. (2001). Moscow, the Fourth Rome: Stalinism, Cosmopolitanism, and the Evolution of Soviet Culture, 1931–1941. Cambridge: Harvard University Press.
- Congdon, L. (2017). Solzhenitsyn: The Historical-Spiritual Destinies of Russia and the West (NIU Series in Slavic, East European, and Eurasian Studies). DeKalb: Northern Illinois University Press.
- Enteen, G. (1989). The Stalinist Conception of Communist Party History. Studies in Soviet Thought, 37(4), 259–274.
- Feinstein, E. (2007). Anna of all the Russias: The Life of Anna Akhmatova. New York: Knopf.
- Fitzpatrick, S. (1971). The Emergence of Glaviskusstvo. Class War on the Cultural Front, Moscow, 1928–29. Soviet Studies, 23(2), 236–253.
- ———. (1976). Culture and Politics under Stalin: A Reappraisal. Slavic Review, 35(2), 211–231. doi:10.2307/2494589.
- ———. (1990). Cultural Revolution in Russia: 1928–1931. Bloomington, IN: Indiana University Press.
- ———. (1992). The Cultural Front: Power and Culture in Revolutionary Russia. Ithaca: Cornell University Press. (Note: Covers the period from the October Revolution through the Stalinist 1930s.)
- Glisic, I. (2018). The Futurist Files: Avant-Garde, Politics, and Ideology in Russia, 1905–1930. DeKalb: Northern Illinois University Press.
- Günther, H. (2003). The Culture of the Stalin Period. New York: Macmillan.
- Hellbeck, J. (2016). Revolution on My Mind: Writing a Diary Under Stalin. Cambridge: Harvard University Press.
- Kirkwood, M. (Ed.) (1990). Language Planning in the Soviet Union. New York: St. Martin's Press.
- Kutulas, J. (1995). The Long War: The Intellectual People's Front and anti-Stalinism, 1930–1940. Durham, NC: Duke University Press.
- Mulcahy, K. V. (1984). Official culture and cultural repression: The case of Dmitri Shostakovich. Journal of Aesthetic Education, 18(3), 69–83.
- Rolf, M. (2009). A Hall of Mirrors: Sovietizing Culture under Stalinism. Slavic Review, 68(3), 601–630.
- Shkandrij, M. (2001). Russia and Ukraine: Literature and the Discourse of Empire from Napoleonic to Postcolonial Times. Montreal & Kingston: McGill-Queen's Press.
- Stites, R. (1992). Russian Popular Culture: Entertainment and Society Since 1900. Cambridge, UK: Cambridge University Press.
- Strong, J. W. (1990). Essays on Revolutionary Culture and Stalinism. Columbus, Ohio: Slavica Publications.
- Tromly, B. (2014). Making the Soviet Intelligentsia: Universities and Intellectual Life Under Stalin and Khrushchev. Cambridge: Cambridge University Press.
- Widdis, E. (2017). Socialist Senses: Film, Feeling, and the Soviet Subject 1917–1940'. Bloomington: Indiana University Press.

==== Arts and Socialist realism ====
- Bullitt, M. (1976). Toward a Marxist Theory of Aesthetics: The Development of Socialist Realism in the Soviet Union. The Russian Review, 35(1), 53–76.
- Conquest, R. (1979). The Pasternak Affair: Courage of Genius: A Documentary Report. New York: Octagon Books.
- Demaitre, A. (1966). The Great Debate on Socialist Realism. The Modern Language Journal, 50(5), 263–268.
- Dobrenko, E., & Naiman, E. (Eds.). (2003). The Landscape of Stalinism: The Art and Ideology of Soviet Space. Seattle: University of Washington Press.
- Dobrenko, E. A., & Jonsson-Skradol, N. (2018). Socialist Realism in Central and Eastern European Literatures under Stalin. New York: Anthem Press. (Note: Covers Post-War period.)
- Dovšenko, O. (1973). Alexander Dovzhenko: The Poet as Filmmaker. Cambridge. Harvard University Press.
- Dunham, V. S., Sheldon, R., & Hough, J. F. (1990). In Stalin's Time: Middleclass Values in Soviet Fiction. Durham, NC: Duke University Press.
- Groys, B. (2014). The Total Art of Stalinism: Avant-Garde, Aesthetic Dictatorship, and Beyond. (C. Rougle Trans.) New York: Verso Books.
- Fitzpatrick, S. (2002). The Commissariat of Enlightenment: Soviet Organization of Education and the Arts under Lunacharsky, October 1917–1921. Cambridge, UK: Cambridge University Press.
- Horvath, R. (2006). The Poet of Terror: Dem'ian Bednyi and Stalinist Culture. The Russian Review, 65(1), 53–71.
- James, C. V. (2014). Soviet Socialist Realism: Origins and Theory. New York: Palgrave Macmillan.
- Kettering, K. L. (2000). An Introduction to the Design of the Moscow Metro in the Stalin Period: "The Happiness of Life Underground." Studies in the Decorative Arts, 7(2), 2–20. * Krylova, A. (2001). "Healers of Wounded Souls": The Crisis of Private Life in Soviet Literature, 1944–1946. The Journal of Modern History, 73(2), 307–331.
- Maguire, R. A. (2000). Red Virgin Soil: Soviet Literature in the 1920s. Evanston, IL: Northwestern University Press.
- Masing-Delic, I. (2012). From Symbolism to Socialist Realism: A Reader. Boston, MA: Academic Studies Press.
- McSmith, A. (2015). Fear and the Muse Kept Watch: The Russian Masters from Akhmatova and Pasternak to Shostakovich and Eisenstein Under Stalin. New York: The New Press.
- Morson, G. S. (1979). Socialist Realism and Literary Theory. The Journal of Aesthetics and Art Criticism, 38(2), 121–133.
- Petrov, P. M. (2015). Automatic for the Masses: The Death of the Author and the Birth of Socialist Realism. Toronto, ON: University of Toronto Press.
- Pouncy, C. (2005). Stumbling Toward Socialist Realism: Ballet In Leningrad, 1927–1937. Russian History, 32(2), 171–193.
- Reid, S. E. (2001). Socialist Realism in the Stalinist Terror: The Industry of Socialism Art Exhibition, 1935-41. The Russian Review, 60(2), 153–184.
- Reid, S. E. (1998). All Stalin’s Women: Gender and Power in Soviet Art of the 1930s. Slavic Review, 57(1), 133–173.
- Robin, R. (1992). Socialist Realism: An Impossible Aesthetic. Palo Alto: Stanford University Press.
- Senelick, L., & Ostrovsky, S. (Eds.). (2014). The Soviet Theater: A Documentary History. New Haven: Yale University Press.
- Udovički-Selb, D. (2009). Between Modernism and Socialist Realism: Soviet Architectural Culture under Stalin's Revolution from Above, 1928–1938. Journal of the Society of Architectural Historians, 68(4), 467–495.
- Youngblood, D. J. (1991). Soviet Cinema in the Silent Era, 1918–1935. Austin, TX: University of Texas Press.

=== Education ===
- Fitzpatrick, S. (2002). The Commissariat of Enlightenment: Soviet Organization of Education and the Arts under Lunacharsky, October 1917–1921. Cambridge, UK: Cambridge University Press.
- ———. (2002). Education and Social Mobility in the Soviet Union 1921–1934. Cambridge, UK: Cambridge University Press.
- Pauly, M. (2014). Breaking the Tongue: Language, Education, and Power in Soviet Ukraine, 1923–1934. University of Toronto Press.

=== Nationality policy ===
- Blank, S. (1994). The Sorcerer as Apprentice: Stalin as Commissar of Nationalities, 1917–1924. Westport: Greenwood Press.
- Blitstein, P. A. (2006). Cultural Diversity and the Interwar Conjuncture: Soviet Nationality Policy in Its Comparative Context. Slavic Review, 65(2), 273–293.
- Carrère d'Encausse, H. (Festinger, N., Trans.) (1992). The Great Challenge: Nationalities and the Bolshevik State, 1917–1930. New York: Holmes & Meier.
- Hirsch, F. (2005). Empire of Nations: Ethnographic Knowledge and the Making of the Soviet Union. Ithaca: Cornell University Press.
- Liber, G. (2010). Soviet Nationality Policy, Urban Growth, and Identity Change in the Ukrainian SSR 1923-1934 (Cambridge Russian, Soviet and Post-Soviet Studies). Cambridge: Cambridge University Press.
- Martin, T. (2001). The Affirmative Action Empire: Nations and Nationalism in the Soviet Union, 1923–1939. Ithaca: Cornell University Press.
- Smith, J. (2013). Red Nations: The Nationalities Experience in and after the USSR. Cambridge: Cambridge University Press.
- Suny, R. G. (1993). The Revenge of the Past: Nationalism, Revolution, and the Collapse of the Soviet Union. Stanford, CA: Stanford University Press.

=== Religion ===
- Adams, A. S., & Shevzov, V. (Eds.). (2018). Framing Mary: The Mother of God in Modern, Revolutionary, and Post-Soviet Russian Culture. DeKalb: Northern Illinois University Press.
- Arjakovsky, A., Ryan, J., & Williams, R. (2013). The Way: Religious Thinkers of the Russian Emigration in Paris and Their Journal, 1925-1940 (J. A. Jillions & M. Plekon, Eds.; 1st ed.). University of Notre Dame Press.
- Bemporad, E. (2013). Becoming Soviet Jews: The Bolshevik Experiment in Minsk. Bloomington, IN: Indiana University Press.
- Bociurkiw, B. R. (1996). The Ukrainian Greek Catholic Church and the Soviet State (1939–1950). Edmonton: Canadian Institute of Ukrainian Studies Press.
- Budnitskii, O., Engel, D., Estraikh, G., & Shternshis, A. (2022). Jews in the Soviet Union: A History. (Note: Currently Volume 3: War, Conquest, and Catastrophe, 1939–1945; and Volume 5: After Stalin, 1953–1967 are available of this multi-volume project.) New York: NYU Press.
- Curtiss, J. S. (1963). The Russian Church and the Soviet State, 1917–1950. Boston, MA: Little, Brown.
- Givens, J. (2018). The Image of Christ in Russian Literature: Dostoevsky, Tolstoy, Bulgakov, Pasternak (NIU Series in Slavic, East European, and Eurasian Studies). DeKalb: Northern Illinois University Press.
- Halevy, Z. (1976). Jewish Students in Soviet Universities in the 1920s. Soviet Jewish Affairs, 6(1), 56–70.
- Husband, W. B. (1998). Soviet Atheism and Russian Orthodox Strategies of Resistance, 1917-1932. The Journal of Modern History, 70(1), 74–107.
- King, R. (1975). Religion and Communism in the Soviet Union and Eastern Europe. Brigham Young University Studies, 15(3), 323–347.
- Miner, S. M. (2003). Stalin's Holy War: Religion, Nationalism, and Alliance Politics, 1941–1945. Chapel Hill, NC: University of North Carolina Press.
- Pinkus, B. (2009). The Jews of the Soviet Union: The History of a National Minority (Cambridge Russian, Soviet and Post-Soviet Studies). Cambridge: Cambridge University Press.
- Pospielovsky, D. (1984). The Russian Church under the Soviet Regime, 1917–1982. Crestwood, NY: St. Vladimir's Seminary Press.
- Rosenthal, B. G. (Ed.). (1997). The Occult in Russian and Soviet Culture. New York: Cornell University Press.
- Tumarkin, N. (1981). Religion, Bolshevism, and the Origins of the Lenin Cult. The Russian Review, 40(1), 35–46.
- Weinryb, B. (1979). Stalin's Zionism. Proceedings of the American Academy for Jewish Research, 46/47, 555–572.
- Wheeler, G. (1977). Islam and the Soviet Union. Middle Eastern Studies, 13(1), 40–49.

=== Gender and family ===
- Alexopoulos, G. (2009). Exiting the Gulag after War Women, Invalids, and the Family. Jahrbücher Für Geschichte Osteuropas, 57(4), 563–579.
- Bridger, S. (2012). Women in the Soviet Countryside: Women's Roles in Rural Development in the Soviet Union (Cambridge Russian, Soviet and Post-Soviet Studies). Cambridge: Cambridge University Press.
- Emery, J. (2017). Alternative Kinships: Economy and Family in Russian Modernism. DeKalb: Northern Illinois University Press.
- Engel, B. (1987). Women in Russia and the Soviet Union. Signs, 12(4), 781–796.
- Engel, B. A. (2021). Marriage, Household, and Home in Modern Russia from Peter the Great to Vladimir Putin (The Bloomsbury History of Modern Russia Series). London and New York: Bloomsbury Academic.
- Fitzpatrick, S., & Slezkine, Y. (2018). In the Shadow of Revolution: Life Stories of Russian Women from 1917 to the Second World War. Princeton:: Princeton University Press.
- Friedman, R. (2020). Modernity, Domesticity and Temporality in Russia: Time at Home. London: Bloomsbury.
- Goldman, W. (2010). Women, the State and Revolution: Soviet Family Policy and Social Life, 1917-1936 (Cambridge Russian, Soviet and Post-Soviet Studies). Cambridge: Cambridge University Press.
- Ilic, M. (Ed.). (2017). The Palgrave Handbook of Women and Gender in Twentieth-Century Russia and the Soviet Union. Palgrave Macmillan.
- Kaminsky, L. (2011). Utopian Visions of Family Life in the Stalin-Era Soviet Union. Central European History, 44(1), 63–91.
- Lapidus, G. W. (1979). Women in Soviet Society: Equality, Development and Social Change. Berkeley, CA: University of California Press.
- Qualls, K. D. (2020). Stalin's Niños: Educating Spanish Civil War Refugee Children in the Soviet Union, 1937–1951. Toronto: University of Toronto Press, 2020.
- Reid, S. E. (1998). All Stalin’s Women: Gender and Power in Soviet Art of the 1930s. Slavic Review, 57(1), 133–173.
- Thurston, R. W. (1991). The Soviet family during the Great Terror, 1935–1941. Soviet Studies, 43(3), 553–574.
- Waters, E. (1992). The Modernisation of Russian Motherhood, 1917–1937. Soviet Studies, 44:1, 123–135.

=== Other topics ===
- Frank, W. D. (2013). Everyone to Skis!: Skiing in Russia and the Rise of Soviet Biathlon (NIU Series in Slavic, East European, and Eurasian Studies). DeKalb: Northern Illinois University Press.

== Terror, famine and the Gulag ==
- Applebaum, A. (2012). Iron Curtain: The Crushing of Eastern Europe, 1944–1956. New York: Doubleday.
- Baberowski, J. Scorched Earth: Stalin's Reign of Terror. New Haven: Yale University Press.
- Brooke, C. (2002). Soviet musicians and the Great Terror. Europe-Asia Studies, 54(3), 397–413.
- Carrère, E. H., & Ionescu, V. (1982). Stalin: Order through Terror. London: Addison-Wesley Longman.
- Chaliand, G., & Blin, A. (2016). Lenin, Stalin, and state terrorism. In The history of terrorism: From antiquity to ISIS (pp. 197–207). University of California Press.
- Cohen, S. F. (1986). Stalin's terror as social history. The Russian Review, 45(4), 375–384.
- Conquest, R. (1970). The Nation Killers: The Soviet Deportation of Nationalities. New York: Macmillan.
- Davies, S. (1999). Popular Opinion in Stalin's Russia: Terror, Propaganda and Dissent, 1934–1941. Cambridge: Cambridge University Press.
- Farnsworth, B. (2010). Conversing with Stalin, surviving the terror: The diaries of Aleksandra Kollontai and the internal life of politics. Slavic Review, 69(4), 944–970.
- Getty, J. A., & Manning, R. (Eds.). (1993). Stalinist Terror: New Perspectives. Cambridge: Cambridge University Press.
- Getty, J. A. (2002). "Excesses Are Not Permitted": Mass Terror and Stalinist Governance in the Late 1930s. The Russian Review, 61(1), 113–138.
- Getty, J. A., Naumov, O. V., & Sher, B. (2002). The Road to Terror: Stalin and the Self-Destruction of the Bolsheviks, 1932–1939. New Haven: Yale University Press.
- Glad, B. (2002). [Why tyrants go too far: Malignant narcissism and absolute power]. Political Psychology, 23(1), 1–37.
- Goldman, W. (2005). Stalinist Terror and Democracy: The 1937 Union Campaign. The American Historical Review, 110(5), 1427–1453.
- Gross, J. T. (1988). Revolution from Abroad: The Soviet Conquest of Poland's Western Ukraine and Western Belorussia (Expanded Edition). Princeton: Princeton University Press.
- Harris, J. (2017). The Great Fear: Stalin's Terror of the 1930s. New York: Oxford University Press.
- Haslam, J. (1986). Political opposition to Stalin and the origins of the terror in Russia, 1932–1936. The Historical Journal, 29(2), 395–418.
- Katchanovski, I. (2010). The Politics of Soviet and Nazi Genocides in Orange Ukraine. Europe-Asia Studies', 62(6), 973–997.
- McDermott, K. (1995). Stalinist Terror in the Comintern: New Perspectives. Journal of Contemporary History, 30(1), 111–130.
- McDermott, K., & Stibbe, M. (2012). Stalinist Terror in Eastern Europe: Elite Purges and Mass Repression. Manchester: Manchester University Press.
- Naimark, N. M. (2012). Stalin's Genocides. Princeton:: Princeton University Press.
- Paperno, I. (2001). Exhuming the bodies of Soviet terror. Representations, 75(1), 89–118.
- Rimmel, L. (1997). Another Kind of Fear: The Kirov Murder and the End of Bread Rationing in Leningrad. Slavic Review, 56(3), 481–499.
- Rosefielde, S. (1997). Documented Homicides and Excess Deaths: New Insights into the Scale of Killing in the USSR during the 1930's. Communist and Post-Communist Studies, 30(3), 321–331.
- Rubenstein, J., & Naumov, V. P. (2005). Stalin's Secret Pogrom: The Postwar Inquisition of the Jewish Anti-Fascist Committee. New Haven: Yale University Press in association with the United States Holocaust Memorial Museum.
- Shearer, D. R. (1998). Crime and social disorder in Stalin's Russia: A reassessment of the Great Retreat and the origins of mass repression. Cahiers du Monde russe, 39(1/2), 119–148.
- Shearer, D. R. (2009). Policing Stalin's Socialism: Repression and Social Order in the Soviet Union, 1924–1953. New Haven: Yale University Press.
- Shearer, D. R. (2018). Stalin at War, 1918–1953: Patterns of Violence and Foreign Threat. Jahrbücher Für Geschichte Osteuropas, 66(2), 188–217.
- Snyder, T. (2010). Bloodlands: Europe Between Hitler and Stalin. New York: Basic Books.
- Tang, P. S. H. (1988). Experiments in Communism: Poland the Soviet Union, and China: Part 3: The Soviet Experience under Stalin: Despotism on the Home Front. Studies in Soviet Thought, 35(3), 185–245.
- Thurston, R. W. (1991). The Soviet family during the Great Terror, 1935–1941. Soviet Studies, 43(3), 553–574.
- Uldricks, T. J. (1977). The Impact of the Great Purges on the People's Commissariat of Foreign Affairs. Slavic Review, 36(2), 187–204.
- Wheatcroft, S. (1996). The Scale and Nature of German and Soviet Repression and Mass Killings, 1930-45. Europe-Asia Studies, 48(8), 1319–1353.
- Wheatcroft, S. G. (2000). The Scale and Nature of Stalinist Repression and Its Demographic Significance: On Comments by Keep and Conquest. Europe-Asia Studies, 52(6), 1143–1159.

=== Gulag ===
- Alexopoulos, G. (2005). Amnesty 1945: The revolving door of Stalin's Gulag. Slavic Review, 64(2), 274–306.
- Alexopoulos, G. (2016). Medical Research in Stalin's Gulag. Bulletin of the History of Medicine, 90(3), 363–393.
- Alexopoulos, G. (2017). Illness and Inhumanity in Stalin's Gulag (Yale-Hoover Series on Authoritarian Regimes). New Haven: Yale University Press.
- Applebaum, A. (2003). Gulag: A History. New York: Doubleday.
- Baldaev, Danzig (2005). Drawings from the Gulag. FUEL.
- Barnes, S. A. (2011). Death and Redemption: The Gulag and the Shaping of Soviet Society. Princeton:: Princeton University Press.
- Bell, W. (2015). Sex, Pregnancy, and Power in the Late Stalinist Gulag. Journal of the History of Sexuality, 24(2), 198–224.
- Bollinger, M. J. (2008). Stalin's Slave Ships: Kolyma, the Gulag fleet, and the Role of the West. Annapolis: Naval Institute Press.
- Draskoczy, J. (2014). Belomor: Criminality and Creativity in Stalin's Gulag. Academic Studies Press.
- Dobson, M. (2012). Stalin's Gulag: Death, Redemption and Memory. The Slavonic and East European Review, 90(4), 735–743.
- Formakov, A. (2017). Gulag Letters (E. D. Johnson, Ed.). New Haven: Yale University Press.
- Jakobson, M. (1993). Origins Of The Gulag: The Soviet Prison Camp System, 1917-1934. University Press of Kentucky.
- Khlevniuk, O., & Belokowsky, S. (2015). The Gulag and the Non-Gulag as One Interrelated Whole. Kritika: Explorations in Russian and Eurasian History. 16(3), 479–498.
- Khlevniuk, O. (2004). The History of the Gulag: From Collectivization to the Great Terror. New Haven: Yale University Press
- Kis, O. (2021). Survival as Victory: Ukrainian Women in the Gulag' (L. Wolanskyj, Trans.) (Harvard Series in Ukrainian Studies). Cambridge: Harvard University Press.
- Nolan, C. (1990). Americans in the Gulag: Detention of US Citizens by Russia and the Onset of the Cold War, 1944–49. Journal of Contemporary History, 25(4), 523–545.
- Nordlander, D. J. (1998). Origins of a Gulag capital: Magadan and Stalinist control in the early 1930s. Slavic Review, 57(4), 791–812.
- Ruder, C. A. (1998). Making History for Stalin: The Story of the Belomor Canal. University Press of Florida.
- Siddiqi, A. (2015). Scientists and specialists in the Gulag: Life and death in Stalin’s sharashka. Kritika: Explorations in Russian and Eurasian History, 16(3), 557–588.
- Solzhenitsyn, A. The Gulag Archipelago, 1918–1956: An Experiment in Literary Investigation (3 vols.). (various publishers and translations).
- Viola, L. (2009). The Unknown Gulag: The Lost World of Stalin's Special Settlements. New York: Oxford University Press.
- Werth, N. (2007). Cannibal Island: Death in a Siberian Gulag. Princeton:: Princeton University Press.

=== Famine ===
- Applebaum, A. (2017). Red Famine: Stalin's War on Ukraine. New York: Doubleday.
- Bertelsen, O. (2017). Starvation and Violence amid the Soviet Politics of Silence, 1928–1929. Genocide Studies International, 11(1), 38–67.
- Boriak, H., Graziosi, A., Hajda, L. A., Kessler, G., Maksudov, S., Pianciola, N., & Grabowicz, G. G. (2009). Hunger by Design: The Great Ukrainian Famine and Its Soviet Context (H. Hryn, Ed.; Illustrated edition). Cambridge: Harvard Ukrainian Research Institute.
- Cameron, S. I. (2018). The Hungry Steppe: Famine, Violence, and the Making of Soviet Kazakhstan. Ithaca: Cornell University Press.
- Conquest, R. (2006). The Harvest of Sorrow: Soviet Collectivization and the Terror-Famine. London: Pimlico.
- Davies, R. W., & Wheatcroft, S. G. (2009). The Years of Hunger: Soviet Agriculture, 1931–1933. London: Macmillan.
- Dolot, M. (1990). Execution by Hunger: The Hidden Holocaust. New York: W.W. Norton.
- Ellman, M. (2005). The Role of Leadership Perceptions and of Intent in the Soviet Famine of 1931-1934. Europe-Asia Studies, 57(6), 823–841.
- Ellman, M. (2007). Stalin and the Soviet Famine of 1932-33 Revisited. Europe-Asia Studies, 59(4), 663–693.
- Gamache, R. (2013). Gareth Jones: Eyewitness to the Holodomor. New York: Welsh Academic Press.
- Graziosi, A. (2004). The Soviet 1931–1933 Famines and the Ukrainian Holodomor: Is a New Interpretation Possible, and What Would Its Consequences Be?. Harvard Ukrainian Studies, 27(1/4), 97–115.
- Graziosi, A., Hajda, L., & Hryn, H. (2013). After the Holodomor: The Enduring Impact of the Great Famine on Ukraine. Cambridge: Harvard Ukrainian Research Institute.
- Hryn, H. (2009). Hunger by Design: The Great Ukrainian Famine and its Soviet Context. Cambridge: Harvard Ukrainian Research Institute.
- Kindler, R. (2014). Famines and Political Communication in Stalinism. Possibilities and Limits of the Sayable. Jahrbücher Für Geschichte Osteuropas, 62(2), 255–272.
- Klid, B., & Motyl, A. J. (Eds.). (2012). The Holodomor Reader: A Sourcebook on the Famine of 1932–1933 in Ukraine. Toronto: Canadian Institute of Ukrainian Studies Press.
- Maksudov, S., & Olynyk, M. D. (2008). Dehumanization: The Change in the Moral and Ethical Consciousness of Soviet Citizens as a Result of Collectivization and Famine. Harvard Ukrainian Studies, 30(1/4), 123–148.
- Wheatcroft, S. (2012). The Soviet Famine of 1946–1947, the Weather and Human Agency in Historical Perspective. Europe-Asia Studies, 64(6), 987–1005.

=== Secret police and intelligence agencies ===
- Birstein, V. J. (2011). SMERSH: Stalin's Secret Weapon: Soviet Military Counterintelligence in WWII. London: Biteback Publishing.
- Conquest, R. (1985). Inside Stalin's Secret Police: NKVD Politics, 1936–1939. Palo Alto: Hoover Institution Press, Stanford University.
- Hagenloh, P. (2009). Stalin's Police: Public Order and Mass Repression in the USSR, 1926–1941. Washington, D.C: Woodrow Wilson Center Press.
- Jansen, M., & Petrov, N. (2002). Stalin's Loyal Executioner: People's Commissar Nikolai Ezhov, 1895–1940. Palo Alto: Hoover Institution Press.
- Parrish, M. (1996). The Lesser Terror: Soviet State Security, 1939–1953. Westport: Praeger.
- Pringle, R. W. (2008). SMERSH: Military Counterintelligence and Stalin's Control of the USSR. International Journal of Intelligence and CounterIntelligence, 21(1), 122–134.
- Rayfield, D. (2004). Stalin and His Hangmen: The Tyrant and Those Who Killed for Him. New York: Random House.
- Shearer, D. R. (2001). Social Disorder, Mass Repression, and the NKVD during the 1930S. Cahiers Du Monde Russe, 42(2/4), 505–534.
- Shearer, D. R., & Chaustov, V. N. (2015). Stalin and the Lubianka: A Documentary History of the Political Police and Security Organs in the Soviet Union, 1922–1953. New Haven: Yale University Press.
- Vatlin, A. I. U., Bernstein, S., & Khlevniuk, O. V. (2016). Agents of Terror: Ordinary Men and Extraordinary Violence in Stalin's Secret Police. Madison, WI: University of Wisconsin Press.

=== Purges and trials ===
- Chandler, R. (2014). “To overcome evil”: Andrey Platonov and the Moscow show trials. New England Review (1990-), 34(3/4), 148–156.
- Clark, W. A. (2015). The Ryutin affair and the “terrorism” narrative of the purges. Russian History, 42(4), 377–424.
- Conquest, R. (1973). The Great Terror: Stalin's Purge of the Thirties. New York: Collier Books. (Note: A revised version was published in 1999 under the title The Great Terror: A Reassessment after Conquest was able to access the Soviet archives. His archival research confirmed most of what he had previously written.)
- Corthorn, P. (2005). Labour, the Left, and the Stalinist Purges of the Late 1930s. The Historical Journal, 48(1), 179–207.
- Davies, S. (1998). The Crime of "Anti-Soviet Agitation" in the Soviet Union in the 1930s. Cahiers Du Monde Russe, 39(1/2), 149–167.
- Dobrenko, V. (2010). Constructing the Enemy: Stalin's Political Imagination and the Great Terror. Russian Journal of Communication, 3(1–2), 72–96.
- Ellman, M. (2003). The Soviet 1937–1938 Provincial Show Trials Revisited. Europe-Asia Studies, 55(8), 1305–1321.
- Getty, J. A. (2009). Origins of the Great Purges: The Soviet Communist Party Reconsidered, 1933-1938 (Cambridge Russian, Soviet and Post-Soviet Studies). Cambridge: Cambridge University Press.
- Heilbrunn, J. (1991). The New York Times and the Moscow show trials. World Affairs, 153(3), 87–101.
- Kang‑Bohr, Y. (2005). Appeals and complaints: Popular reactions to the party purges and the Great Terror in the Voronezh region, 1935–1939. Europe‑Asia Studies, 57(1), 135–154.
- Khlevniuk, O., & Favorov, N. S. (2009). Stalin and the Great Terror 1937–1938. In Master of the house: Stalin and his inner circle (pp. 166–202). Yale University Press.
- Kocho‑Williams, A. (2008). The Soviet diplomatic corps and Stalin's purges. The Slavonic and East European Review, 86(1), 90–110.
- Kuromiya, H. (2007). The Voices of the Dead: Stalin's Great Terror in the 1930s. New Haven: Yale University Press.
- Manning, R. (2009). Political Terror or Political Theater: The "Raion" Show Trials of 1937 and the Mass Operations. Russian History, 36(2), 219–253.
- McDermott, K. (2007) Stalinism 'From Below'?: Social Preconditions of and Popular Responses to the Great Terror. Totalitarian Movements and Political Religions, 8(3–4), 609–622.
- Shatz, M. (1984). Stalin, the Great Purge, and Russian History: A new look at the "New Class". Pittsburgh: University of Pittsburgh Press.
- Shearer, D. R. (2009). “Once and for all time”: Background to the Great Purges. In Policing Stalin's socialism: Repression and social order in the Soviet Union, 1924–1953 (pp. 285–319). Yale University Press.
- Solomon, P. H. (1987). Soviet criminal justice and the Great Terror. Slavic Review, 46(3), 391–413.
- Viola, L. (2017). Stalinist Perpetrators on Trial: Scenes from the Great Terror in Soviet Ukraine. New York: Oxford University Press.
- Weitz, E. D. (2002). Racial Politics Without the Concept of Race: Reevaluating Soviet Ethnic and National Purges. Slavic Review, 61(1), 1–29.
- Whitewood, P. (2015). The purge of the Red Army and the Soviet mass operations, 1937–38. The Slavonic and East European Review, 93(2), 286–314.

=== Memory ===
- Jones, P. (2013). Between myth and memory: War, terror, and Stalin in Soviet popular memory. In Myth, memory, trauma: Rethinking the Stalinist past in the Soviet Union, 1953–70 (pp. 173–211). Yale University Press.

=== Ethnic cleansing ===
- Kim, A. (2012). The Repression of Soviet Koreans during the 1930s. The Historian, 74(2), 267–285.
- Martin, T. (1998). The Origins of Soviet Ethnic Cleansing. The Journal of Modern History, 70(4), 813–861.
- Morris, J. (2004). The Polish Terror: Spy Mania and Ethnic Cleansing in the Great Terror. Europe-Asia Studies, 56(5), 751–766.
- Musial, B. (2013). The "Polish Operation" of the NKVD: The Climax of the Terror Against the Polish Minority in the Soviet Union. Journal of Contemporary History, 48(1), 98–124.
- Nekrich, A. M. (1978). The Punished Peoples: The Deportation and Tragic Fate of Soviet Minorities at the End of the Second World War. New York: Norton.
- Weitz, E. D. (2002). Racial Politics Without the Concept of Race: Reevaluating Soviet Ethnic and National Purges. Slavic Review, 61(1), 1–29.

== Agriculture and the peasantry ==
- Bridger, S. (2012). Women in the Soviet Countryside: Women's Roles in Rural Development in the Soviet Union (Cambridge Russian, Soviet and Post-Soviet Studies). Cambridge: Cambridge University Press.
- Brower, D. (1977). Collectivized Agriculture in Smolensk: The Party, the Peasantry, and the Crisis of 1932. The Russian Review, 36(2), 151–166.
- Conquest, R. (2006). The Harvest of Sorrow: Soviet Collectivization and the Terror-Famine. London: Pimlico.
- Cox, T. M. (1979). Rural Sociology in the Soviet Union: Its History and Basic Concepts. New York: Holmes & Meier Publishers.
- Danilov, V. P. (1988). Rural Russia Under the New Regime. London: Hutchinson.
- ———., Ivnitskii, N. A., Kozlov, D., Shabad, S., & Viola, L. (2008). The War Against the Peasantry, 1927–1930: The Tragedy of the Soviet Countryside. New Haven: Yale University Press.
- Davies, R. W. (1980). The Industrialization of Soviet Russia, The Soviet Collective Farm, 1929–1930. London: Palgrave.
- ———, & Wheatcroft, S. G. (2009). The Years of Hunger: Soviet Agriculture, 1931–1933. London: Macmillan.
- ———, Tauger, M., & Wheatcroft, S. (1995). Stalin, grain stocks and the famine of 1932-1933. Slavic Review, 54(3), 642–657.
- Fitzpatrick, S. (1994). Stalin's Peasants: Resistance and Survival in the Russian Village after Collectivization. New York: Oxford University Press.
- Huhn, U. (2017). Reconciling Failure and Success: Soviet Elites and the Collectivized Village. Jahrbücher Für Geschichte Osteuropas, 65(3), 362–400.
- Joravsky, D. (2010). Lysenko Affair. Chicago, IL: University of Chicago Press. (Note: See Trofim Lysenko and Lysenkoism.)
- Lewin, M., Nove, I., Biggart, J., & Nove, A. (1968). Russian Peasants and Soviet Power: A Study of Collectivization. New York: Norton.
- Marples, D. R. (1985). Western Ukraine and Western Belorussia under Soviet Occupation: The Development of Socialist Farming, 1939-1941. Canadian Slavonic Papers / Revue Canadienne Des Slavistes, 27(2), 158–177.
- Reese, R. (1996). Red Army Opposition to Forced Collectivization, 1929–1930: The Army Wavers. Slavic Review, 55(1), 24–45.
- Shanin, T. (1972). The Awkward Class: Political Sociology of Peasantry in a Developing Society: Russia 1910–1925. Oxford: Clarendon Press.
- Swain, N. (2009). Collective Farms which Work? (Cambridge Russian, Soviet and Post-Soviet Studies). Cambridge: Cambridge University Press.
- Tauger, M. B. (2001). Natural disaster and human actions in the Soviet famine of 1931–1933. The Carl Beck Papers in Russian and East European Studies, 1506, 67.
- ———. (2004). Soviet Peasants and Collectivization, 1930-39: Resistance and adaptation. The Journal of Peasant Studies, 31(3–4), 427–456.
- ———. (1991). The 1932 harvest and the famine of 1933. Slavic Review, 50 (1), 70–89.
- Thorniley, D., & Gardiner, K. (2016). Rise and Fall of the Soviet Rural Communist Party 1927–39. London: Palgrave Macmillan.
- Volin, L. (1970). A Century of Russian Agriculture: From Alexander II to Khrushchev. Cambridge: Harvard University Press.
- ———. (1999). Peasant Rebels Under Stalin: Collectivization and the Culture of Peasant Resistance. New York: Oxford University Press.
- ———. (2011). The Best Sons of the Fatherland: Workers in the Vanguard of Soviet Collectivization. New York: Oxford University Press.
- Yesdauletova, A; Yesdauletov, A; Aliyeva, S; Kakenova, G. (2015). Famine and Kazakh Society in the 1930s. The Anthropologist, 22(3), 537–544.

== Industrialization and urbanization ==
=== Labor ===
- Fitzpatrick, S. (1989). War and Society in Soviet Context: Soviet Labor before, during, and after World War II. International Labor and Working-Class History, 35, 37–52.
- Keys, B. (2009). An African-American Worker in Stalin's Soviet Union: Race and the Soviet Experiment in International Perspective. The Historian, 71(1), 31–54.
- Siegelbaum, L. H., & Suny, R. G. (1994). Making Workers Soviet: Power, Class, and Identity. Ithaca: Cornell University Press.
- Smith, S. A. (1997). Russian Workers and the Politics of Social Identity. The Russian Review, 56(1), 1–7.

== Stalinism and ideologies ==
- Barnett, V. (2006). Understanding Stalinism: The “Orwellian Discrepancy” and the “Rational Choice Dictator.” Europe-Asia Studies, 58(3), 457–466.
- Biggart, J. (1981). "Anti-Leninist Bolshevism": The Forward Group of the RSDRP. Canadian Slavonic Papers, 23(2), 134–153.
- Brandenberger, D., & Dubrovsky, A. (1998). 'The People Need a Tsar': The Emergence of National Bolshevism as Stalinist Ideology, 1931–1941. Europe-Asia Studies, 50(5), 873–892.
- Campeanu, P. (2016). Origins of Stalinism: From Leninist Revolution to Stalinist Society. London: Routledge.
- Conquest, R. (1992). Stalin: Breaker of Nations. New York: Penguin Books.
- Daniels, R. V. (1960). The Conscience Of The Revolution: Communist Opposition In Soviet Russia. Cambridge: Harvard University Press.
- Daniels, R. V. (1972). The Stalin Revolution: Foundations of Soviet Totalitarianism. Lexington, MA: D.C. Heath and Company.
- Daniels, R. V. (1991). The Left Opposition as an Alternative to Stalinism. Slavic Review, 50(2), 277–285.
- Donoso, A. (1979). Stalinism in Marxist Philosophy. Studies in Soviet Thought, 19(2), 113–141.
- Fitzpatrick, S. (1986). New Perspectives on Stalinism. The Russian Review, 45(4), 357–373.
- Fitzpatrick, S. (2006). Stalinism: New Directions. London: Routledge.
- Gaido, D. (2011). Marxist Analyses of Stalinism. Science & Society, 75(1), 99–107.
- Gellately, R. (2016). Stalin's Curse: Battling for Communism in War and Cold War. New York: Oxford University Press.
- Geyer, M., & Fitzpatrick, S. (2009). Beyond Totalitarianism: Stalinism and Nazism Compared. Cambridge, UK: Cambridge University Press.
- Gorlizki, Y. (2002). Ordinary Stalinism: The Council of Ministers and the Soviet Neopatrimonial State, 1946–1953. The Journal of Modern History, 74(4), 699–736.
- Greensmith, J. (2023). In the Mind of Stalin. Barnsley: Pen and Sword History.
- Gregor, A. J. (2009). Marxism, Fascism, and Totalitarianism: Chapters in the Intellectual History of Radicalism. Palo Alto: Stanford University Press.
- Hoffmann, D. L. (Ed.). (2002). Stalinism: The Essential Readings. Hoboken, NJ: Wiley-Blackwell.
- Kennan, G. F. (1967). The Legacy of Stalinism. Proceedings of the Massachusetts Historical Society, 79, 123–134.
- Kershaw, I., & Lewin, M. (1997). Stalinism and Nazism: Dictatorships in Comparison. Cambridge: Cambridge University Press.
- Liebich, A. (1995). Mensheviks Wage the Cold War. Journal of Contemporary History, 30(2), 247–264.
- Losurdo, D. (2004). Towards a Critique of the Category of Totalitarianism. Historical Materialism. 12(2), 25–55.
- Mccauley, M. (2015). Stalin and Stalinism. New York: Routledge.
- Medvedev, R. A. (1979). On Stalin and Stalinism. New York: Oxford University Press.
- Naimark, N., Pons, S., & Quinn-Judge, S. (Eds.). (2017). The Cambridge History of Communism: Volume 2, The Socialist Camp and World Power 1941–1960s. Cambridge, UK: Cambridge University Press. (Note: The notes at the end of each essay (chapter) includes substantial bibliographic entries.)
- Pauley, B. F. (2015). Hitler, Stalin, and Mussolini: Totalitarianism in the Twentieth Century. West Sussex, UK: Wiley-Blackwell.
- Plamper, J. (2012). The Stalin Cult: A Study in the Alchemy of Power. New Haven: Yale University Press.
- Pons, S., & Smith, S. A. (Eds.). (2017). The Cambridge History of Communism: Volume 1, World Revolution and Socialism in One Country 1917–1941. Cambridge: Cambridge University Press.
- Reichman, H. (1988). Reconsidering "Stalinism". Theory and Society, 17(1), 57–89.
- Reiman, M. (1987). The Birth of Stalinism: The USSR on the Eve of the "Second Revolution". Bloomington, IN: Indiana University Press.
- Schull, J. (1992). The Ideological Origins of "Stalinism" in Soviet Literature. Slavic Review, 51(3), 468–484.
- Suny, R. G. (2020). Red Flag Wounded: Stalinism and the Fate of the Soviet Experiment. New York: Verso.
- Tumarkin, M. M. (2011). The long life of Stalinism: Reflections on the aftermath of totalitarianism and social memory. Journal of Social History, 44(4), 1047–1061.
- Van Ree, E. (1994). Stalin's Bolshevism: The First Decade. International Review of Social History, 39(3), 361–381.
- Von Laue, T. (1983). Stalin in Focus. Slavic Review, 42(3), 373–389.
- White, E. (2007). The Socialist Revolutionary Party, Ukraine, and Russian National Identity in the 1920s. The Russian Review, 66(4), 549–567.
- Wood, A. (2005). Stalin and Stalinism. London: Routledge.

=== Stalin and Lenin ===
- Gellately, R. (2007). Lenin, Stalin, and Hitler: The Age of Social Catastrophe. New York: Knopf.
- Gerratana, V. (1977). Stalin, Lenin and 'Leninism'. New Left Review, (103).
- McNeal, R. (1959). Lenin's Attack on Stalin: Review and Reappraisal. American Slavic and East European Review, 18(3), 295–314.
- Service, R. (2000). Lenin: A Biography. Cambridge: Belknap Press.
- Volkogonov, D. (1994). Lenin: Life and Legacy. London: HarperCollins.

=== Stalin and Trotsky ===
- Deutscher, I. (2015). The Prophet: The Life of Leon Trotsky. New York: Verso. (Note: Originally published in three volumes by Oxford University Press (1954, 1959, 1963).)
- Felshtinsky, Y. (1990). Lenin, Trotsky, Stalin and the Left Opposition in the USSR 1918–1928. Cahiers Du Monde Russe Et Soviétique, 31(4), 569–578.
- Getty, J. A. (1986). Trotsky in Exile: The Founding of the Fourth International. Soviet Studies, 38(1), 24–35.
- McNeal, R. (1961). Trotsky's Interpretation of Stalin. Canadian Slavonic Papers, 5, 87–97.
- Volkogonov, D. (1996). Trotsky, the Eternal Revolutionary. New York: Free Press.

=== Propaganda and ideology ===
- Berkhoff, K. C. (2012). Motherland in Danger: Soviet Propaganda during World War II. Cambridge: Harvard University Press.
- Bowlt, J. E. (2002). Stalin as Isis and Ra: Socialist Realism and the Art of Design. The Journal of Decorative and Propaganda Arts, 24, 35–63.
- Bonnell, V. E. (1999). Iconography of Power: Soviet Political Posters under Lenin and Stalin. Berkeley: University of California Press.
- Brandenberger, D. (2012). Propaganda State in Crisis: Soviet Ideology, Indoctrination, and Terror under Stalin, 1927–1941. Yale University Press.
- Brunstedt, J. (2021). The Soviet Myth of World War II: Patriotic Memory and the Russian Question in the USSR (Studies in the Social and Cultural History of Modern Warfare). New York: Cambridge University Press.
- Davies, S. (1999). Popular Opinion in Stalin's Russia: Terror, Propaganda and Dissent, 1934–1941. Cambridge: Cambridge University Press.
- Dobrenko, E., & Naiman, E. (Eds.). (2003). The Landscape of Stalinism: The Art and Ideology of Soviet Space. Seattle: University of Washington Press.
- Erley, M. (2021). On Russian Soil: Myth and Materiality. DeKalb: Northern Illinois University Press.
- Fainberg, D. (2020). Cold War Correspondents: Soviet and American Reporters on the Ideological Frontlines'. Baltimore: Johns Hopkins University Press.
- Glisic, I. (2018). The Futurist Files: Avant-Garde, Politics, and Ideology in Russia, 1905–1930. DeKalb: Northern Illinois University Press.
- Haslam, J. (2021). Stalin's Gamble on German Nationalism. In The Spectre of War: International Communism and the Origins of World War II (Vol. 184, pp. 104–121). Princeton University Press.
- Knight, A. (1991). Beria and the Cult of Stalin: Rewriting Transcaucasian Party History. Soviet Studies, 43(4), 749–763.
- Pisch, A. (2016). The Personality Cult of Stalin in Soviet Posters, 1929–1953: Archetypes, Inventions and Fabrications. Canberra: ANU Press.
- Sériot, P. (2017). Language Policy as a Political Linguistics: The Implicit Model of Linguistics in the Discussion of the Norms of Ukrainian and Belarusian in the 1930s. Harvard Ukrainian Studies, 35(1/4), 169–185.
- Thompson, E. (1991). Nationalist Propaganda in the Soviet Russian Press, 1939–1941. Slavic Review, 50(2), 385–399.
- Thompson, R. J. (1988). Reassessing Personality Cults: The Cases of Stalin and Mao. Studies in Comparative Communism, 21(1), 99–128.
- Tucker, R. C. (1979). The Rise of Stalin's Personality Cult. The American Historical Review, 84(2), 347–366.
- Westerman, F., Garrett, S., & Westerman, F. (2011). Engineers of the Soul: The Grandiose Propaganda of Stalin's Russia. New York: The Overlook Press.

== Soviet territories ==
For Terror and Famine related works, see Terror, Famine and the Gulag section.

- Blauvelt, T. K. (2021). Clientelism and Nationality in an Early Soviet Fiefdom: The Trials of Nestor Lakoba. London: Routledge.
- Blauvelt, T. K. & Smith, J. (Eds.) (2016). Georgia After Stalin: Nationalism and Soviet Power. London: Routledge.
- Boyanin, Y. (2011). The Kyrgyz of Naryn in the Early Soviet Period: A Study Examining Settlement, Collectivisation and Dekulakisation on the Basis of Oral Evidence. Inner Asia, 13(2), 279–296.
- Boriak, H., Graziosi, A., Hajda, L. A., Kessler, G., Maksudov, S., Pianciola, N., & Grabowicz, G. G. (2009). Hunger by Design: The Great Ukrainian Famine and Its Soviet Context (H. Hryn, Ed.; Illustrated edition). Cambridge: Harvard Ukrainian Research Institute.
- Edgar, A. (2006). Bolshevism, Patriarchy, and the Nation: The Soviet "Emancipation" of Muslim Women in Pan-Islamic Perspective. Slavic Review, 65(2), 252–272.
- Edgar, A. L. (2004). Tribal Nation: The Making of Soviet Turkmenistan. Princeton, N.J.: Princeton University Press.
- Forestier-Peyrat, E. (2017). Soviet Federalism at Work: Lessons from the History of the Transcaucasian Federation, 1922–1936. Jahrbücher Für Geschichte Osteuropas, 65(4), 529–559.
- Glebov, S. (2017). From Empire to Eurasia: Politics, Scholarship, and Ideology in Russian Eurasianism, 1920s–1930s (NIU Series in Slavic, East European, and Eurasian Studies). DeKalb: Northern Illinois University Press.
- Gross, J. T. (2002). Revolution from Abroad: The Soviet Conquest of Poland's Western Ukraine and Western Belorussia. Princeton:: Princeton University Press.
- Kasekamp, A. (2017). Chapter 6: Between Anvil and Hammer. In A History of the Baltic States. New York: Macmillan Education.
- Kassymbekova, B. (2016). Despite Cultures: Early Soviet Rule in Tajikistan. Pittsburgh: University of Pittsburgh Press.
- Keller, S. (2020). Russia and Central Asia: Coexistence, Conquest, Convergence. Toronto: University of Toronto Press.
- Khalid, A. (2021). Central Asia: A New History from the Imperial Conquests to the Present. Princeton: Princeton University Press.
- Khalid, A. (2015). Making Uzbekistan: Nation, Empire, and Revolution in the Early USSR. Ithaca: Cornell University Press.
- King, C. (2012). The Ghost of Freedom: A History of the Caucasus. New York: Oxford University Press.
- Kotljarchuk, A., & Sundström, O. (2017). Ethnic and Religious Minorities in Stalin's Soviet Union: New Dimensions of Research. Huddinge: Södertörn University.
- Kuromiya, H. (2002). Freedom and Terror in the Donbas: A Ukrainian-Russian Borderland, 1870s–1990s. Cambridge: Cambridge University Press.
- Liber, G. (2010). Soviet Nationality Policy, Urban Growth, and Identity Change in the Ukrainian SSR 1923-1934 (Cambridge Russian, Soviet and Post-Soviet Studies). Cambridge: Cambridge University Press.
- Mark, S. G. (1998). Stalinism and the Demise of Old Siberia. Nationalities Papers, 26(4), 777–784.
- Marples, D. R. (1992). Stalinism in Ukraine: In the 1940s. New York: St. Martin's Press.
- Marshall, A. (2010). The Caucasus Under Soviet Rule. New York City, NY: Routledge.
- Miller, C. (2021). We Shall Be Masters: Russian Pivots to East Asia from Peter the Great to Putin. Cambridge: Harvard University Press.
- Nahaylo, B., & Swoboda, V. (1990). Soviet Disunion: A History of the Nationalities Problem in the USSR. London: Hamilton.
- Northrop, D. (2004). Veiled Empire: Gender and Power in Stalinist Central Asia. Ithaca: Cornell University Press.
- Pauly, M. (2014). Breaking the Tongue: Language, Education, and Power in Soviet Ukraine, 1923-1934. Toronto: University of Toronto Press.
- Plokhy, S. (2017). The Gates of Europe: A History of Ukraine. New York: Basic Books.
- Rieber, A. (2001). Stalin, Man of the Borderlands. The American Historical Review, 106(5), 1651–1691.
- Saparov, A (2015). From Conflict to Autonomy in the Caucasus: The Soviet Union and the making of Abkhazia, South Ossetia and Nagorno Karabakh. New York: Routledge.
- Scott, E. (2017). Familiar Strangers: The Georgian Diaspora and the Evolution of Soviet Empire. New York: Oxford University Press.
- Shkandrij, M. (2015). Ukrainian Nationalism: Politics, Ideology, and Literature, 1929-1956. New Haven: Yale University Press.
- Sirutavičius, V. (2015). National Bolshevism or National Communism: Features of Sovietization in Lithuania in the Summer of 1945 (The First Congress of the Intelligentsia). The Hungarian Historical Review, 4(1), 3–28.
- Stronski, P. (2010). Tashkent: Forging a Soviet City, 1930–1966. Pittsburgh: University of Pittsburgh Press.

=== Indigenous peoples and ethnic groups ===
- Kappeler, A., Kohut, Z. E., Sysyn, F. E., & von Hagen, M. (Eds.). (2003). Culture, nation, and identity: the Ukrainian-Russian encounter, 1600–1945. Toronto: Canadian Institute of Ukrainian Studies Press.

== Foreign policy and external relations ==
- Carley, M. (1996). 'A Fearful Concatenation of Circumstances': The Anglo-Soviet Rapprochement, 1934-6. Contemporary European History, 5(1), 29–69.
- Gati, C. (1984). The Stalinist Legacy in Soviet Foreign Policy. Proceedings of the Academy of Political Science, 35(3), 214–226.
- Gellately, R. (2016). Stalin's Curse: Battling for Communism in War and Cold War. New York: Oxford University Press.
- Gorodetsky, G. (2011). The Precarious Truce: Anglo-Soviet Relations 1924-27 (Cambridge Russian, Soviet and Post-Soviet Studies). Cambridge: Cambridge University Press.
- Haas, M. L. (2022). An Unrealized Frenemy Alliance: Britain's and France's Failure to Ally with the Soviet Union, 1933–39. In Frenemies: When Ideological Enemies Ally (pp. 69–121). Cornell University Press.
- Kocho‑Williams, A. (2008). The Soviet diplomatic corps and Stalin's purges. The Slavonic and East European Review, 86(1), 90–110.
- Large, J. A. (1978). The origins of Soviet collective security policy, 1930–32. Soviet Studies, 30(2), 212–236.
- Lynch, A. (2011). The Soviet Study of International Relations (Cambridge Russian, Soviet and Post-Soviet Studies). Cambridge: Cambridge University Press.
- Materski, W. (2000). The Second Polish Republic in Soviet Foreign Policy (1918-1939). The Polish Review, 45(3), 331–345.
- McDermott, K. (1995). Stalinist Terror in the Comintern: New Perspectives. Journal of Contemporary History, 30(1), 111–130.
- McDermott, K., & Agnew, J. (1997). The Comintern: A History of International Communism from Lenin to Stalin. New York: St. Martin's Press.
- Rieber, A. J. (2015). Stalin and the Struggle for Supremacy in Eurasia. Cambridge, UK: Cambridge University Press.
- Snyder, T., & Brandon, R. (2014). Stalin and Europe: Imitation and Domination, 1928–1953. New York: Oxford University Press.
- Staklo, V. A. (2008). Enemies Within the Gates?: The Comintern and the Stalinist Repression, 1934–1939. Cambridge, UK: Cambridge University Press.
- Stanisławska, S. (1975). Soviet Policy Toward Poland 1926-1939. The Polish Review, 20(1), 30–39.
- Ulam, A. B. (1974). Expansion and Coexistence: Soviet Foreign Policy, 1917–73. New York: Praeger. online.
- Zubok, Vladislav and Constantine Pleshakov. Inside the Kremlin's Cold War: from Stalin to Khrushchev (Harvard UP, 1996) online

== Government ==
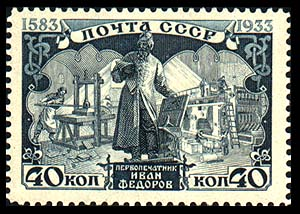
Soviet Postage Stamp (1933)

- Armstrong, J. L. (1990). Policy Toward the Polish Minority in the Soviet Union, 1923–1989. The Polish Review, 35(1), 51–65.
- Bailes, K. E. (2016). Technology and Society under Lenin and Stalin: Origins of the Soviet Technical Intelligentsia, 1917–1941. Princeton:: Princeton University Press.
- Dunmore, T. (1984). Soviet Politics, 1945–53. London: Macmillan Press.
- Fitzpatrick, S. (1979). Stalin and the Making of a New Elite, 1928–1939. Slavic Review, 38(3), 377–402.
- ———. (2015). On Stalin's Team: The Years of Living Dangerously in Soviet Politics. Princeton:: Princeton University Press.
- Getty, J. A. (2013). Practicing Stalinism: Bolsheviks, Boyars, and the Persistence of Tradition. New Haven: Yale University Press.
- Gill, G. (2009). The Origins of the Stalinist Political System (Cambridge Russian, Soviet and Post-Soviet Studies). Cambridge: Cambridge University Press.
- Gorlizki, Y., & Chlevnjuk, O. V. (2008). Cold Peace: Stalin and the Soviet Ruling Circle, 1945–1953. New York: Oxford University Press.
- Gorlizki, Y., & Khlevniuk, O. (2020). Substate Dictatorship: Networks, Loyalty, and Institutional Change in the Soviet Union. New Haven: Yale University Press.
- Hahn, W. G. (2019). Postwar Soviet Politics: The Fall of Zhdanov and the Defeat of Moderation, 1946-53. Ithaca: Cornell University Press.
- Harrison, M. (2009). Soviet Planning in Peace and War, 1938-1945 (Cambridge Russian, Soviet and Post-Soviet Studies). Cambridge: Cambridge University Press.
- Harrison, M. (2010). Accounting for War: Soviet Production, Employment, and the Defence Burden, 1940-1945 (Cambridge Russian, Soviet and Post-Soviet Studies). Cambridge: Cambridge University Press.
- Heinzen, J. (2007). The Art of the Bribe: Corruption and Everyday Practice in the Late Stalinist USSR. Slavic Review, 66(3), 389–412.
- Heinzen, J. (2016). The Art of the Bribe: Corruption Under Stalin, 1943-1953 (Yale-Hoover Series on Authoritarian Regimes). New Haven: Yale University Press.
- Lampert, N. (2016). Technical Intelligentsia and the Soviet State. London: Palgrave Macmillan.
- Manning, R. T. (1984). Government in the Soviet Countryside in the Stalinist Thirties: The Case of Belyi Raion in 1937. Pittsburgh: University of Pittsburgh Press.
- Nation, R. C. (2018). Black Earth, Red Star: A History of Soviet Security Policy, 1917–1991. Ithaca: Cornell University Press.
- Rassweiler, A. (1983). Soviet Labor Policy in the First Five-Year Plan: The Dneprostroi Experience. Slavic Review, 42(2), 230–246.
- Rigby, T. H., Brown, A., Reddaway, P., & Schapiro, L. (1983). Authority, Power and Policy in the USSR: Essays Dedicated to Leonard Schapiro. London: Macmillan.
- ———. (1988). Staffing USSR Incorporated: The Origins of the Nomenklatura System. Soviet Studies, 40(4), 523–537.
- Rittersporn, G. T. (1991). Stalinist simplifications and Soviet complications: Social tensions and political conflicts in the USSR, 1933-1953. Chur; New York: Harwood Academic Publishers.
- Rosenfeldt, N. E. (1978). Knowledge and Power: The Role of Stalin's Secret Chancellery in the Soviet System of Government. Copenhagen: Rosenkilde and Bagger.

=== Party ===
- Belova, E., & Lazarev, V. (2013). Funding Loyalty: The Economics of the Communist Party (Hoover Series on Authoritarian Regimes). New Haven: Yale University Press.
- Cohn, E. (2015). The High Title of a Communist: Postwar Party Discipline and the Values of the Soviet Regime. Ithaca: Cornell University Press.
- Gregor, R. (2019). Resolutions and Decisions of the Communist Party of the Soviet Union, Volume 2: The Early Soviet Period 1917–1929. Toronto, ON: University of Toronto Press.
- McNeal, R. H. (1971). The Decisions of the CPSU and the Great Purge. Soviet Studies, 232, 177–185.
- ———. (2019). Resolutions and Decisions of the Communist Party of the Soviet Union, Volume 3: The Stalin Years 1929–1953. Toronto, ON: University of Toronto Press.
- Rigby, T. H. (1968). Communist Party Membership in the USSR, 1917–1967. Princeton:: Princeton University Press.
- Schapiro, L. (1985). The Communist Party of the Soviet Union. London: Methuen Publishing.

=== Judicial ===
- Rittersporn, G. (1984). Soviet Officialdom and Political Evolution: Judiciary Apparatus and Penal Policy in the 1930s. Theory and Society, 13(2), 211–237.

== Economy ==
- Davies, R. W. (1998). The Soviet Economy in Turmoil, 1929–1930. New York: Macmillan Press.
- Dohan, M. (1976). The Economic Origins of Soviet Autarky 1927/28-1934. Slavic Review, 35(4), 603–635.
- Dunmore, T. (1980). The Stalinist Command Economy: The Soviet State Apparatus and Economic Policy 1945–53. London: Macmillan.
- Gardner, R. (1984). Power and Taxes in a One-Party State: The USSR, 1925–1929. International Economic Review, 25(3), 743–755.
- Gatrell, P. and Lewis, R. (1992). Russian and Soviet Economic History. The Economic History Review, 45(4), pp. 743–754.
- Hanson, P. (2016). Rise and Fall of the Soviet Economy: An Economic History of the USSR, 1945–1991. New York: Routledge.
- Hunter, H. (1973). The Overambitious First Soviet Five-Year Plan. Slavic Review, 32(2), 237–257.
- Nove, A. (1993). An Economic History of the USSR. New York: Penguin Books.
- Stone, S. (2011). Materials for a Balance of the Soviet National Economy, 1928-1930 (Cambridge Russian, Soviet and Post-Soviet Studies). Cambridge: Cambridge University Press.

== The Soviet Armed Forces ==
- Clark, P. (1981). Changsha in the 1930: Red Army Occupation. Modern China, 7(4), 413–444.
- Erickson, J. (2001). The Soviet High Command: A Military-Political History, 1918–1941. London: Routledge.
- Glantz, D. M. (1998). Stumbling Colossus: The Red Army on the Eve of World War. Lawrence, KS: University Press of Kansas.
- ———. (2005). Colossus Reborn: The Red Army at War: 1941–1943. Lawrence, KS: University Press of Kansas.
- Hill, A. (2019). The Red Army and the Second World War. Cambridge, UK: Cambridge University Press.
- Hooton, E. R. (2013). Stalin's Claws, From the Purges to the Winter War: Red Army Operations before Barbarossa, 1937–1941. West Sussex, UK: Tattered Flag Press.
- Kavalerchik, B., Lopukhovsky, L., & Orenstein, H. (2017). The Price of Victory: The Red Army's Casualties in the Great Patriotic War. South Yorkshire, UK: Pen and Sword Military.
- Kolkowicz, R. (1967). The Soviet Military and the Communist Party. London: Routledge.
- Krylova, A. (2014). Soviet Women in Combat: A History of Violence on the Eastern Front. Cambridge, UK: Cambridge University Press.
- Mark, J. (2005). Remembering Rape: Divided Social Memory and the Red Army in Hungary 1944–1945. Past & Present, (188), 133–161.
- Merridale, C. (2006). Culture, Ideology and Combat in the Red Army, 1939–45. Journal of Contemporary History, 41(2), 305–324.
- Merridale, C. (2007). Ivan's War: Life and Death in the Red Army, 1939–1945. New York: Metropolitan Books.
- Muir, M. (1981). American Warship Construction for Stalin's Navy Prior to World War II: A Study in Paralysis of Policy. Diplomatic History, 5(4), 337–351.
- Nikolaieff, A. (1947). The Red Army in the Second World War. The Russian Review, 7(1), 49–60.
- Reese, R. R. (1996). Stalin's Reluctant Soldiers: A Social History of the Red Army, 1925–1941. Lawrence, KS: University Press of Kansas.
- Reese, R. (1996). Red Army Opposition to Forced Collectivization, 1929–1930: The Army Wavers. Slavic Review, 55(1), 24–45. doi:10.2307/2500977.
- Reese, R. R. (2011). Why Stalin's Soldiers Fought: The Red Army's Military Effectiveness in World War II. Lawrence, KS: University Press of Kansas.
- Roberts, C. (1995). Planning for War: The Red Army and the Catastrophe of 1941. Europe-Asia Studies, 47(8), 1293–1326.
- Statiev, A. (2010). Penal Units in the Red Army. Europe-Asia Studies, 62(5), 721–747.
- Von, H. M., & Gilbert S. (1993). Soldiers in the Proletarian Dictatorship: The Red Army and the Soviet Socialist State, 1917–1930. Ithaca: Cornell University Press.
- Whitewood, P. (2015). The Red Army and the Great Terror: Stalin's Purge of the Soviet Military. Lawrence, KS: University Press of Kansas.

== The beginning of the Cold War and the Soviet Bloc ==
- Applebaum, A. (2012). Iron Curtain: The Crushing of Eastern Europe, 1944–1956. New York: Doubleday.
- Avey, P. (2012). Confronting Soviet Power: U.S. Policy during the Early Cold War. International Security, 36(4), 151–188.
- Babiracki, P. (2015). Soviet Soft Power in Poland: Culture and the Making of Stalin's New Empire, 1943–1957. Chapel Hill, NC: The University of North Carolina Press.
- Barghoorn, F. (1949). The Soviet Union between War and Cold War. The Annals of the American Academy of Political and Social Science, 263, 1–8.
- Evangelista, M. (1982). Stalin's Postwar Army Reappraised. International Security, 7(3), 110–138.
- Gaddis, J. L. (1989). Intelligence, Espionage, and Cold War Origins. Diplomatic History, 13(2), 191–212.
- Gaddis, J. L. (2007). The Cold War: A New History. New York: Penguin Books.
- Gordin, M. D. (2013). Red Cloud at Dawn: Truman, Stalin, and the End of the Atomic Monopoly. New York: Farrar, Straus and Giroux.
- Hasanli, J. (2011). Stalin and the Turkish Crisis of the Cold War, 1945–1953. Lanham: Rowman & Littlefield.
- Holtsmark, S. G., Neumann, I. B., & Westad, O. A. (2016). The Soviet Union in Eastern Europe, 1945–89. New York: Palgrave Macmillan.
- Lebow, K. (2016). Unfinished Utopia: Nowa Huta, Stalinism, and Polish Society, 1949–56. Ithaca: Cornell University Press.
- Linz, S. (1985). Foreign Aid and Soviet Postwar Recovery. The Journal of Economic History, 45(4), 947–954.
- Mastny, V. (2010). The Cold War and Soviet Insecurity: The Stalin Years. Oxford: Oxford University Press.
- Miller, D. (2012). The Cold War: A Military History. London: Pimlico.
- Naimark, N. M. (2004). Stalin and Europe in the Postwar Period, 1945–53: Issues and Problems. Journal of Modern European History, 2(1), 28–57.
- Nolan, C. (1990). Americans in the Gulag: Detention of US Citizens by Russia and the Onset of the Cold War, 1944–49. Journal of Contemporary History, 25(4), 523–545.
- Oberender, A. (2012). Stalin's Postwar Foreign Policy. Kritika: Explorations in Russian and Eurasian History, 13(4), 937–949.
- Roberts, G. (1994). Moscow and the Marshall Plan: Politics, Ideology and the Onset of the Cold War, 1947. Europe-Asia Studies, 46(8), 1371–1386.
- Seabury, P. (1968). Cold War Origins, I. Journal of Contemporary History, 3(1), 169–182.
- Szaynok, B. (2002). The Anti-Jewish Policy Of The USSR In The Last Decade Of Stalin's Rule And Its Impact On The East European Countries With Special Reference To Poland. Russian History, 29(2/4), 301–315.
- Thomas, B. (1968). Cold War Origins, II. Journal of Contemporary History, 3(1), 183–198.
- Westad, O. A. (1993). Cold War and Revolution: Soviet-American Rivalry and the Origins of the Chinese Civil War, 1944–1946. New York: Columbia University Press.
- Westad, O. A. (2011). Brothers in Arms: The Rise and Fall of the Sino-Soviet Alliance, 1945–1963. Washington, DC: Woodrow Wilson Center Press.
- Westad, O. A. (2019). Cold War: A World History. New York: Basic Books.

== Historiography ==
- Avrich, P. (1960). The Short Course and Soviet Historiography. Political Science Quarterly, 75(4), 539–553.
- Alexopoulos, G., Tomoff, K., Hessler, J., & Fitzpatrick, S. (2011). Writing the Stalin Era: Sheila Fitzpatrick and Soviet Historiography. New York: Palgrave Macmillan.
- Beilharz, P. (1985). Trotsky as Historian. History Workshop, (20), 36–55.
- Edele, M. (2020). Debates on Stalinism. Issues in Historiography. Manchester: Manchester University Press.
- Eley, G. (1986). History with the Politics Left Out-Again? The Russian Review, 45(4), 385–394.
- Getty, J., & Manning, R. (Eds.). (1993). Stalinist Terror: New Perspectives. Cambridge, UK: Cambridge University Press.
- Kenez, P. (1986). Stalinism As Humdrum Politics. The Russian Review, 45(4), 395–400.
- Kennan, G. (1971). The Historiography of the Early Political Career of Stalin. Proceedings of the American Philosophical Society, 115(3), 165–169.
- Lak, Martijn (2015). Contemporary Historiography on the Eastern Front in World War II. The Journal of Slavic Military Studies, 28(3), 567–587.
- McNeal, R. (1966). The Study of Bolshevism: Sources and Methods. International Journal, 21(4), 521–526.
- Meyer, A. (1986). Coming to Terms with the Past... and with One's Older Colleagues. The Russian Review, 45(4), 401–408.
- Morozova, I. (2005). Contemporary Azerbaijani Historiography on the Problem of "Southern Azerbaijan" after World War II. Iran & the Caucasus, 9(1), 85–120.
- Naimark, N. (2004). Stalin and Europe in the Postwar Period, 1945–53: Issues and Problems. Journal of Modern European History, 2(1), 28–57.
- Ryan, J., & Grant, S. (Eds.). (2020). Revisioning Stalin and Stalinism: Complexities, Contradictions, and Controversies. London: Bloomsbury Academic.
- Siegelbaum, L., & Suny, R. G. (1993). Making the Command Economy: Western Historians on Soviet Industrialization. International Labor and Working-Class History, (43), 65–76.
- Siegelbaum, L. H. (2012). Whither Soviet History?: Some Reflections on Recent Anglophone Historiography. Region, 1(2), 213–230.
- Suny, R. G. (2017). Red Flag Unfurled: History, Historians, and the Russian Revolution. New York: Verso.
- Tucker, R. C. (2017). Stalinism: Essays in Historical Interpretation. London: Routledge.
- Viola, L. (2002). The Cold War in American Soviet Historiography and the End of the Soviet Union. The Russian Review, 61(1), 25–34.

=== Memory Studies ===
- Adler, N. (2005). The Future of the Soviet past Remains Unpredictable: The Resurrection of Stalinist Symbols Amidst the Exhumation of Mass Graves. Europe-Asia Studies, 57(8), 1093–1119.
- Bogumił, Z. (2022). The Museum Visitor Book as a Means of Public Dialogue about the Gulag Past: The Case of the Solovki Museum. Kritika: Explorations in Russian and Eurasian History, 23(2), 315–338.
- Brunstedt, J. (2021). The Soviet Myth of World War II: Patriotic Memory and the Russian Question in the USSR (Studies in the Social and Cultural History of Modern Warfare). New York: Cambridge University Press.
- Corbesero, S. (2011). History, Myth, and Memory: A Biography of a Stalin Portrait. Russian History, 38(1), 58–84.
- Friedla, K., & Nesselrodt, M. (Eds.). (2021). Polish Jews in the Soviet Union (1939–1959): History and Memory of Deportation, Exile, and Survival. Academic Studies Press.
- Jones, P. (2013). Between myth and memory: War, terror, and Stalin in Soviet popular memory. In Myth, memory, trauma: Rethinking the Stalinist past in the Soviet Union, 1953–70 (pp. 173–211). Yale University Press.
- Khrushcheva, N. (2005). "Rehabilitating" Stalin. World Policy Journal, 22(2), 67–73.
- Knight, A. (1991). Beria and the Cult of Stalin: Rewriting Transcaucasian Party History. Soviet Studies, 43(4), 749–763.
- Thompson, R. J. (1988). Reassessing Personality Cults: The Cases of Stalin and Mao. Studies in Comparative Communism, 21(1), 99–128.
- Weiner, A. (1999). Nature, Nurture, and Memory in a Socialist Utopia: Delineating the Soviet Socio-Ethnic Body in the Age of Socialism. The American Historical Review, 104(4), 1114–1155.

== Reference works ==
- The Cambridge Encyclopedia of Russia and the former Soviet Union. (1994). Cambridge, UK: Cambridge University Press.
- Kasack, W. & Atack, R. (1988). Dictionary of Russian Literature since 1917. New York: Columbia University Press.
- Minahan, J. (2012). The Former Soviet Union's Diverse Peoples: A Reference Sourcebook. Santa Barbara, CA: ABC-CLIO.
- Smith, S. A. (2014). The Oxford Handbook of the History of Communism. New York: Oxford University Press.
- Vronskaya, J. & Čuguev, V. (1992). The Biographical Dictionary of the Former Soviet Union: Prominent people in all fields from 1917 to the present. London: Bowker-Saur.

== Other works ==
- Aronova, E. (2021). Scientific History: Experiments in History and Politics from the Bolshevik Revolution to the End of the Cold War'. Chicago: University of Chicago Press.
- Cohen, S. F. (2011). Soviet Fates and Lost Alternatives: From Stalinism to the New Cold War. New York: Columbia University Press.
- David-Fox, M., Holquist, P., & Martin, A. M. (2012). Fascination and Enmity: Russia and Germany as entangled histories, 1914–1945. Pittsburgh: University of Pittsburgh Press.
- Gamache, R. (2020). Contextualizing FDR's Campaign to Recognize the Soviet Union, 1932–1933: Propaganda, Famine Denial, and Ukrainian Resistance. Harvard Ukrainian Studies, 37(3/4), 287–322.
- Harris, J. (2007). Encircled by Enemies: Stalin's Perceptions of the Capitalist World, 1918 – 1941. Journal of Strategic Studies, 30(3), 513–545.
- Hartley, J. M. (2021). The Volga: A History. New Haven: Yale University Press.
- Kern, G. (1974). Solzhenitsyn's Portrait of Stalin. Slavic Review, 33(1), 1–22.
- Knight, A. (2001). Who Killed Kirov?: The Kremlin's Greatest Mystery. New York: Hill and Wang.
- Lenoe, M. (2002). Did Stalin Kill Kirov and Does It Matter?. The Journal of Modern History, 74(2), 352–380.
- Lenoe, M., & Prozumenščikov, M. J. (2010). The Kirov Murder and Soviet History. New Haven: Yale University Press.
- Linkhoeva, T. (2020). Revolution Goes East: Imperial Japan and Soviet Communism (Studies of the Weatherhead East Asian Institute). Ithaca: Cornell University Press.
- Pethybridge, R. (2014). Social Prelude to Stalinism. New York: Palgrave Macmillan.
- Raeff, R. (1990). Russia Abroad: A Cultural History of the Russian Emigration, 1919-1939. New York: Oxford University Press.
- Read, C. (2003). The Stalin Years: A Reader. New York: Palgrave Macmillan.
- Roberts, G. (2022). Stalin's Library: A Dictator and his Books. New Haven: Yale University Press.
- Sudjic, D. (2022). Stalin's Architect: Power and Survival in Moscow. Cambridge: The MIT Press.
- Sullivan, R. (2015). Stalin's Daughter: The Extraordinary and Tumultuous Life of Svetlana Alliluyeva (Illustrated edition). New York: HarperCollins.
- Weitz, E. (2002). Racial Politics without the Concept of Race: Reevaluating Soviet Ethnic and National Purges. Slavic Review, 61(1), 1–29.

== Legacy ==
- Ali, T. (2012). The Stalinist Legacy: Its Impact on Twentieth Century World Politics. Chicago, Ill: Haymarket Books.
- Cohen, S. F. (1973). Stalin's Revolution Reconsidered. Slavic Review, 32(2), 264–270.
- Gugushvili, A., Kabachnik, P., & Gilbreath, A. H. (2016). Cartographies of Stalin: Place, Scale, and Reputational Politics. The Professional Geographer, 683, 356–367.
- Gugushvili, A., & Kabachnik, P. (2019). Stalin on Their Minds: A Comparative Analysis of Public Perceptions of the Soviet Dictator in Russia and Georgia. International Journal of Sociology, 49(5–6), 317–341.
- Losurdo, Domenico (2023). Stalin: History and Critique of a Black Legend. Iskra Books. ISBN 978-1088162545.
- Medvedev, R. A., & Shriver, G. (1989). Let History Judge: The Origins and Consequences of Stalinism. New York: Columbia University Press.

== Biographies ==
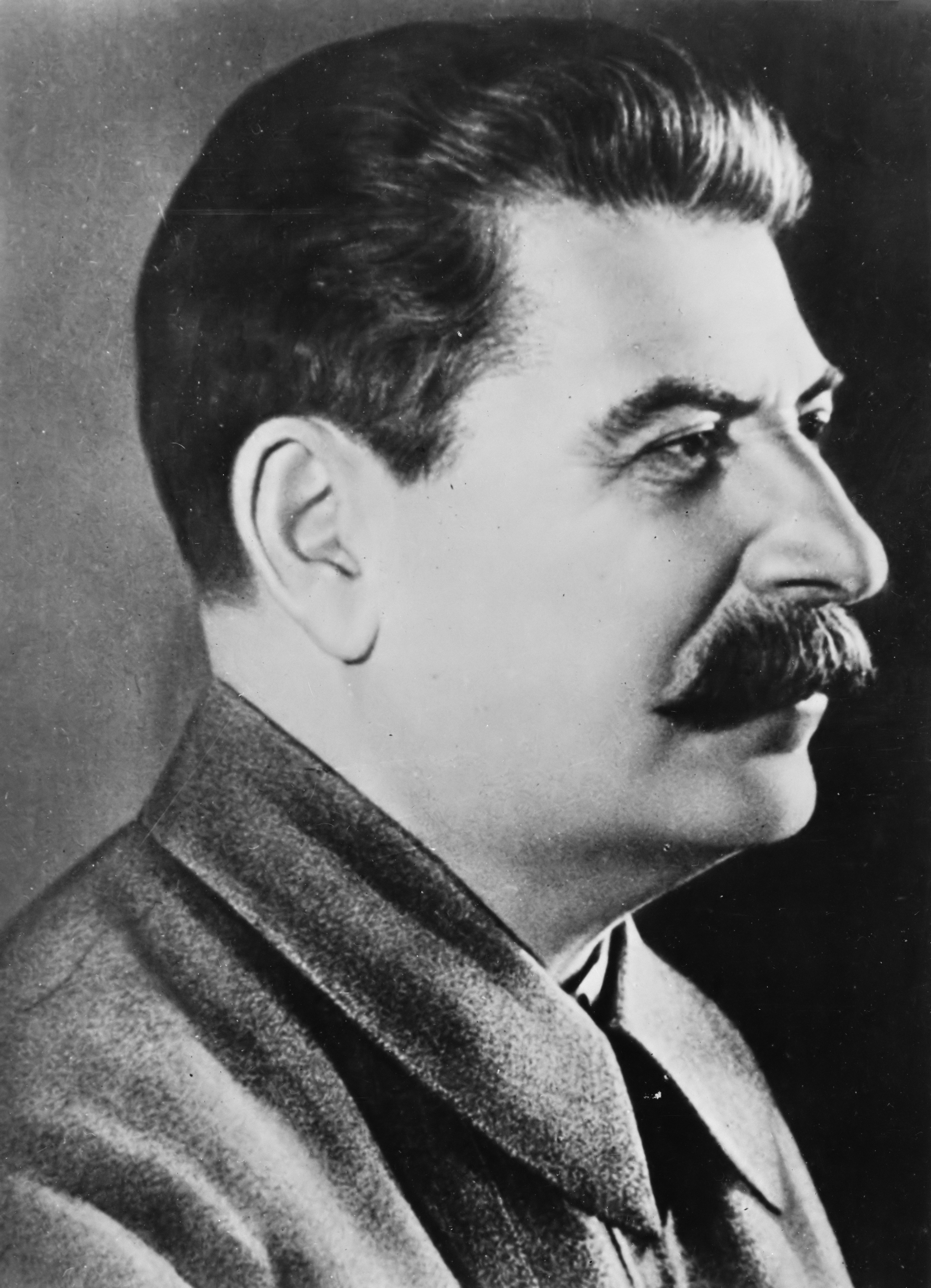
Joseph Stalin in 1942

=== Joseph Stalin ===
- Conquest, R. (1991). Stalin: Breaker of Nations. New York: Viking Press.
- Davies, S., & Harris, J. (Eds.). (2005). Stalin: A New History. Cambridge, UK: Cambridge University Press.
- Deutscher, I. (1996). Stalin: A Political Biography. London: Penguin.
- Khlevniuk, O. V., & Favorov, N. S. (2015). Stalin: New Biography of a Dictator. New Haven: Yale University Press. (Note: Some catalogs/bibliographies list author's last name as Chlevnjuk.)
- Kotkin, S. (2014). Stalin: Volume 1: Paradoxes of Power, 1878–1928. New York: Penguin Books.
- Kotkin, S. (2017). Stalin: Volume 2: Waiting for Hitler, 1928–1941. New York: Penguin Books.
- Kuromiya, H. (2013). Stalin. Oxfordshire, UK: Routledge.
- Kuromiya, H. (2007). Stalin and his era. The Historical Journal, 50(3), 711–724.
- Laqueur, W. (2002). Stalin: The Glasnost Revelations. New York: Scribner.
- Medvedev, Z. A., Medvedev, R. A., & Dahrendorf, E. (2006). The Unknown Stalin. London: I.B. Tauris.
- Montefiore, S. (2004). Stalin: The Court of the Red Tsar. New York: Knopf. (Note: Biography of Stalin with a significant focus on his relationship with his inner circle.)
- ———. (2007). Young Stalin. New York: Knopf.
- Payne, R. (1965). The rise and fall of Stalin. Simon and Schuster.
- Rubenstein, J. (2016). The Last Days of Stalin. New Haven: Yale University Press.
- Service, R. W. (2006). Stalin: A Biography. Cambridge: Belknap Press.
- Suny, R. G. (2020). Stalin: Passage to Revolution. Princeton: Princeton University Press.
- Tucker, R. C. (1973). Stalin as revolutionary: A study in history and personality, 1879-1929. W. W. Norton & Company.

- Tucker, R. C. (2019). Stalin in power: The revolution from above, 1928-1941. W. W. Norton & Company.

==== Subject specific biographies of Stalin ====
- Holloway, D. (1994). Stalin and the bomb: The Soviet Union and atomic energy, 1939-1956. Yale University Press.
- Khlevniuk, O. V., & Favorov, N. S. (2009). Stalin and the Great Terror 1937–1938. In Master of the house: Stalin and his inner circle (pp. 166–202). Yale University Press.
- McMeekin, S. (2021). Stalin's war: A new history of World War II. Basic Books.
- Murphy, D. E. (2005). What Stalin knew: The enigma of Barbarossa. Yale University Press.
- Roberts, G. (2022). Stalin's Library: A Dictator and His Books. New Haven: Yale University Press.
- Roberts, G. (2007). Stalin's wars: From World War to Cold War, 1939-1953. Yale University Press.

==== Collective biographies including Stalin ====
- Carley, M. J. (2023). Stalin's gamble: The search for allies against Hitler, 1930-1936. University of Toronto Press.
- O'Brien, P. P. (2022). The strategists: Churchill, Stalin, Roosevelt, Mussolini, and Hitler—How war made them and how they made war. Simon & Schuster.
- Overy, R. (2006). The dictators: Hitler's Germany, Stalin's Russia. W. W. Norton & Company.
- Rayfield, D. (2004). Stalin and his hangmen: The tyrant and those who killed for him. Random House.
- Rees, L. (2020). Hitler and Stalin: The tyrants and the Second World War. PublicAffairs.

=== Other biographies ===
- Cohen, S. F. (1980). Bukharin and the Bolshevik Revolution: A Political Biography, 1888–1938. New York: Oxford University Press.
- Feinstein, E. (2007). Anna of all the Russias: The Life of Anna Akhmatova. New York: Knopf.
- Getty, J. A., & Naumov, O. V. (2008). Yezhov: The Rise of Stalin's "Iron Fist. New Haven (Conn.: Yale University Press.
- Jangfeldt, B. (2014). Mayakovsky: A Biography (1st Edition; H. D. Watson, Trans.). Chicago: University of Chicago Press.
- Jansen, M., & Petrov, N. (2002). Stalin's Loyal Executioner: People's Commissar Nikolai Ezhov, 1895–1940. Palo Alto: Hoover Institution Press.
- Khlevniuk, O. (Nordlander, D., Trans.) (1995). In Stalin's Shadow: The Career of "Sergo" Ordzhonikidze. Aramonk, New York: M. E. Sharpe.
- Knight, A. (1993). Beria: Stalin's First Lieutenant. Princeton:: Princeton University Press.
- Roberts, G. (2011). Molotov: Stalin's Cold Warrior. Washington, D.C: Potomac Books.
- Roberts, G. (2012). Stalin's General: The Life of Georgy Zhukov. New York: Random House.
- Sullivan, R. (2015). Stalin's Daughter: The Extraordinary and Tumultuous Life of Svetlana Alliluyeva (Illustrated edition). New York: HarperCollins.

== Memoirs and literary accounts ==
- Alliluyeva, S. (2016). Twenty Letters to a Friend: A Memoir. New York: Harper Perennial. (Note: Memoir written in the form of fictional letters by Stalin's daughter, Svetlana Alliluyeva.)
- Allilueva, S. (2017). Only One Year: A Memoir. New York: Harper Perennial. (Note: Second volume of memoirs written by Stalin's daughter, Svetlana Alliluyeva.)
- Ginzburg, L. (2016). Notes from the Blockade. London: Random House. (Note: A work of documentary fiction created about wartime Leningrad, written by a survivor of the siege of Leningrad.)
- Grossman, V. (2012). Life and Fate (R. Chandler, Trans.). New York: NYRB Classics. (Note: Original work published 1960.)
- Scott, J. (1989). Behind the Urals: An American Worker in Russia's City of Steel. Bloomington, IN: Indiana University Press. (Note: Originally published in by Secker & Warburg, 1942.)
- Solzhenitsyn, A. (1962/1963). One Day in the Life of Ivan Denisovich. (Note: The translation by H.T. Willetts is the only one that is based on the canonical Russian text and the only one authorized by Solzhenitsyn. See One Day in the Life of Ivan Denisovich. (1991). New York: Farrar Straus & Giroux ISBN 978-0-00-271607-9.)
- Werth, A. (1961). Russia At War, 1941-1945. (Note: Werth was a British journalist and describes his experiences as the BBC correspondent in the war time Soviet Union, at the same time attempting to provide a fuller picture of the Russia at war.)
- Zhukov, G. (1971) The Memoirs of Marshal Zhukov (J. Cape, Trans.). London: Cape. (Note: First published in the Soviet Union bv Novosty Press Agency Publishing House, Moscow, 1969.)

Gulag and purge survivor memoirs

- Ginzburg, E. (2014). Journey Into the Whirlwind. San Diego, CA: Helen & Kurt Wolff Books.
- Mandelʹshtam, N. (2011). Hope Abandoned and Hope Against Hope. Various.
- Shalamov, V., & Rayfield, D. (2018). Kolyma Stories. New York: New York Review Books.
- Rossi, Jacques (2018). Fragments of Lives: Chronicles of the Gulag (Antonelli-Street trans.). Prague: Karolinum.
- Solomon, Michel (1971). Magadan. New York: Auerbach.

== English language translations of primary sources ==
=== Works by Joseph Stalin ===
Collected Works

- The Collected Works of J. V. Stalin, 16 vols. 1901–1952. (1953–54). Collection Index and Text
- Correspondence with Franklin D. Roosevelt and Harry S. Truman. (1941–1945). Collection Index and Text.
- Correspondence with Winston S. Churchill and Clement R. Attlee. (1941–1945). Collection Index and Text.
- Josef Stalin Internet Archive. Collection Index and Text
- War Speeches, Orders of the Day and Answers to Foreign Press Correspondents During the Great Patriotic War. (1941–1945). Collection Index and Text.
- Davies, R. W. (2003). The Stalin-Kaganovich Correspondence, 1931–36 (O. Khlevniuk, E. A. Rees, L. P. Kosheleva, & L. A. Rogovaya, Eds.; S. Shabad, Trans.). New Haven: Yale University Press.
- Lih, L. T., Naumov, O. V., & Khlevniuk, O. V. (1996). Stalin's Letters to Molotov, 1925–1936. New Haven: Yale University Press.

Individual works

- Briefly About Disagreements in the Party. (1905). Text.
- Anarchism or Socialism?. (1906–7). Text.
- Marxism and the National Question. (1913). Text.
- Report to Comrade Lenin by the Commission of the Party Central Committee and the Council of Defence on the Reasons for the Fall of Perm. (1919). Text.
- Our Disagreements. (1921). Text.
- Thirteenth Conference of the R.C.P.(B). (1924). [Thirteenth Conference of the R.C.P.(B) Text].
- On the Death of Lenin. (1924). Text.
- The Foundations of Leninism. (1924). Text.
- Trotskyism or Leninism?. (1924). Text.
- The October Revolution & the Tactics of the Russian Communists. (1924). Text.
- The Fourteenth Congress of the C.P.S.U.(B.). (1925). Text.
- Concerning Questions of Leninism. (1926). Text.
- The Social-Democratic Deviation in our Party. (1926). Text.
- Reply to the Report on "The Social-Democratic Deviation in our Party". (1926). Text.
- The Seventh Enlarged Plenum of the E.C.C.I.. (1926). Text.
- The Trotskyist Opposition Before and Now. (1927). Text.
- The Fifteenth Congress of the C.P.S.U.(B.). (1927). Text.
- The Work of the April Joint Plenum of the Central Committee and Central Control Commission. (1928). Text.
- Plenum of the C.C., C.P.S.U.(B.). (1928). Text.
- Results of the July Plenum of the C.C., C.P.S.U.(B.). (1928). Text.
- The Right Danger in the C.P.S.U.(B.). (1928). Text.
- Industrialisation of the country and the Right Deviation in the C.P.S.U.(B.). (1928). Text.
- The National Question and Leninism. (1929). Text.
- The Right Deviation in the C.P.S.U.(B.). (1929). Text.
- Concerning Questions of Agrarian Policy in the U.S.S.R.. (1929). Text.
- Dizzy with Success. (1930). Text.
- Anti-Semitism. (1931). Text.
- Some Questions Concerning the History of Bolshevism. (1931). Text.
- The Results of the First Five-Year Plan. (1933). Text.
- Work in the Countryside. (1931). Text.
- Report to the Seventeenth Party Congress on the Work of the Central Committee of the C.P.S.U.(B.). (1934). Text.
- Marxism Versus Liberalism. (1934). Text.
- Remarks on a Summary of the Manual of the History of the USSR. (1934). Text.
- Remarks on a Summary of the Manual of the Modern History. (1934). Text.
- Interview Between J. Stalin and Roy Howard. (1936). Text.
- On the Draft Constitution of the U.S.S.R. (1936). Text.
- Defects in Party Work and Measures for Liquidating Trotskyite and Other Double Dealers. (1937). Text.
- Dialectical and Historical Materialism. (1938). Text.
- History of the C.P.S.U.(B) (Short Course). (1939). Text.
- Report on the Work of the Central Committee to the Eighteenth Congress of the C.P.S.U.(B.). (1939). Text.
- Radio Broadcast. (July 3, 1941). Text.
- On the Allied Landing in Northern France. (1944). Text.
- Stalin's Address to the People (Victory Speech). (May 9, 1945). Text.
- Coexistence, American-Soviet Cooperation, Atomic Energy, Europe. (1947). Text.
- Berlin Crisis, the U.N. and Anglo-American Aggressive Policies, Churchill. (1948). Text.
- Economic Problems of Socialism in the USSR. (1952). Text.

=== Other primary sources ===
Collections

- The Making of the Sino-Soviet Alliance, 1945–1950 (Document Collection). The Wilson Center Digital Archive.
- The Sino-Soviet Alliance, 1950–1959 (Document Collection). The Wilson Center Digital Archive.
- Cold War Origins Document Collection. The Wilson Center Digital Archive.
- Documents related to Stalin and the Cold War (Document Collection). The Wilson Center Digital Archive.
- Applebaum, A., & Miller, J. A. (2014). Gulag Voices: An Anthology. New Haven: Yale University Press. (Note: Letters written by survivors of the Gulag.)
- Bidlack, R., Lomagin, N., & Schwartz, M. (2014). The Leningrad Blockade, 1941–1944: A New Documentary History from the Soviet Archives. New Haven: Yale University Press.
- Daniels, R. V. (Ed.). (2001). A Documentary History of Communism in Russia: From Lenin to Gorbachev (3rd Edition). Hanover, NH: University Press of New England.
- Formakov, A. (2017). Gulag Letters (E. D. Johnson, Ed.). New Haven: Yale University Press.
- Stalin, J., Kaganovich, L. M. (2003). The Stalin-Kaganovich Correspondence, 1931–36. (Davies, R. W. et al. Eds.). New Haven: Yale University Press.
- Storella, C. J., Sokolov, A. K. (2013). The Voice of the People: Letters from the Soviet Village, 1918–1932. New Haven: Yale University Press.

Individual works

- The Five Year Plan – Originally published February 1930. From Marxists Internet Archive (2008)
- Brandenberger, D., & Zelenov, M. (2019). Stalin's Master Narrative: A Critical Edition of the History of the Communist Party of the Soviet Union (Bolsheviks), Short Course. New Haven: Yale University Press.
- Tukhachevsky, M. (1936). Marshal Tukhachevsky on the Red Army. The Slavonic and East European Review, 14(42), 694–701.

Government documents

- The Molotov–Ribbentrop Pact (August, 1939). Fordham University.
- Secret Supplementary Protocols of the Molotov–Ribbentrop Non-Aggression Pact (September, 1939). The Wilson Center.
- Gregor, R. (Ed.). (1974). Resolutions and Decisions of the Communist Party of the Soviet Union: Vol. 2, The Early Soviet Period, 1917–1929. Toronto, ON: University of Toronto Press.
- McNeal, R. H. (Ed.). (1974). Resolutions and Decisions of the Communist Party of the Soviet Union, Volume 3: The Stalin Years 1929–1953. Toronto, ON: Toronto University Press.

== See also ==
- Bibliography of the Russian Revolution and Civil War
- Bibliography of the Asharshylyk
- Bibliography of the Holodomor
- Bibliography of the Post Stalinist Soviet Union
- Bibliography of Ukrainian history
- Bibliography of the history of Belarus and Byelorussia
- Bibliography of the history of Poland
- Joseph Stalin bibliography
- Timeline of Russian history
- Index of Old Bolsheviks
- Index of articles related to the Russian Revolution and Civil War
