= Viktor Danilov (historian) =

For the priest and religious dissident of the same name, see Viktor Danilov

Victor Petrovich Danilov (Note: Russian: Ви́ктор Петро́вич Дани́лов) (March 4, 1925 – April 16, 2004) was a Russian historian specializing in the history of Soviet agriculture during the first half of the 20th Century. He held the academic ranks of doctor of history (1982) and professor (1990). Never explicitly a dissident against the Soviet regime nor a member of the so-called New Direction revisionist history movement of the 1960s, Danilov nevertheless bucked historical orthodoxy regarding the nature of peasant life and agricultural collectivization in the Soviet Union and was a leading voice for a thoroughgoing reexamination of early Soviet history during the years of perestroika and glasnost ushered in by Mikhail Gorbachev.

In addition to a seminal monographs on the topic, Danilov was the lead editor for several important collections of archival materials gathered by international teams of scholars.

== Biography ==
=== Early years ===
Viktor Danilov was born March 4, 1925, in Orsk, Orenburg gubernia to a rural family with a background both in farming and artisanal crafts. This was one of the regions of southern Russia heavily affected by the Famine of 1921.

He completed secondary school in Orenburg, and subsequently graduated from an artillery school in January 1943, after which he fought as an officer in World War II.

=== Career ===
After the war, Danilov entered Orenburg State Pedagogical Institute studying history, graduating in 1950.

Danilov then moved to the Moscow Institute of History to continue his historical training, serving at the same time as the secretary of the Communist Party's youth section, the Komsomol, at the school. He successfully defending a Candidate of Sciences dissertation on "The Creation of Material-Technical Prerequisites for the Collectivization of Agriculture in the USSR." This work was published in book form in 1957 and was an example of what British historian Orlando Figes descibed as a "well turned out product of the orthodox style of Soviet history," turning on extended discussions of the forces of production and their corresponding relations of production in the context of the Russian 1920s.

It was during his time at graduate school that new Soviet Communist Party General Secretary Nikita Khrushchev delivered his sensational denunciation of the sundry abuse of his predecessor, Joseph Stalin. These revelations helped Danilov and academics and students of his generation, subsequently remembered as the "Sixties-people" [shestidesiatnikovi], to find their own way to reexamine received official orthodoxies.

In Danilov's case, this came in the form of a reevaluation of collectiviation of agriculture, previously held to have been a historically necessary restructuring based upon the mass penetration of a modern technology. Rather, Danilov argued — controversially — that the technical base for mechanized agriculture was wholly inadequate for the attempted move to universally collectivized agriculture. Therefore, the output of the Soviet Union's agricultural center was doomed to remain at its previous, unmechanized level for a protracted period — a thesis which implicitly explained the still-unspoken brutality of forced collectivization and dekulakization, culminating in the horrific Great Famine of 1932–33.

Instead, Danilov argued that the Russian peasantry remained enmeshed in its traditional patriarchal form, built around the dual pillars of the household economy and its public interaction as part of the village commune (mir). The forced campaign to drive the peasantry into large-scale collective farms, a premature economic form, was bound to result in difficulty, Danilov maintained.

He was awarded the title of Doctor of History in 1982 after defending a dissertation based upon material gathered for a pair of monographs on The Soviet Village Before Collectivization, which had already been published in book form in 1977 and 1979, respectively.

Danilov’s professional career was linked to the Institute of Russian History of the Russian Academy of Sciences, where he rose from graduate student to chief researcher. He was never a dissident, but rather argued as a Marxist that the brutal agricultural changes implemented by Joseph Stalin from the late 1920s onward marked a fundamental departure from the agrarian policy of Soviet founder V.I. Lenin and the Communist Party during the period of the New Economic Policy (NEP) of he early 1920s.

Danilov was part of the generation of experiencing firsthand the de-Stalinization of Soviet society and scholarship initiated by Nikita Khrushchev before its eventual return to rigid orthodoxy under the rule of Leonid Brezhnev.

== Works ==
Danilov was a prolific writer who wrote, edited, or was a contributor to more than 300 articles, books, and collections during his life. These included, most notably:

- Создание материально-технических предпосылок коллективизации сельского хозяйства в СССР. [Creating the Material and Technical Prerequisites for the Collectivization of Agriculture in the USSR] Moscow, 1957.
- Советская доколхозная деревня: население, землепользование, хозяйство. [The Soviet Village Before Collectivization: Population, Land Use, and Economy] Moscow, 1977.
- Советская доколхозная деревня: социальная структура и социальные отношения. [The Soviet Village Before Collectivization: Social Structure and Social Relations] Moscow, 1979.
- Rural Russia Under the New Regime. Orlando Figes, trans. and ed. London: Hutchinson, 1988. (Co-released by Indiana University Press.)
- Советская деревня глазами ВЧК-ОГПУ-НКВД: Документы и материалы в 4 томах. [The Soviet Village Through the Eyes of the Cheka-OGPU-NKVD: Documents and Materials in 4 Volumes] Lead editor with A. Berelovich. Moscow: ROSSPEN, 1998–2012.
- Трагедия советской деревни: Коллективация и раскулачивание: Документы и материалы в 5 томах. [The Tragedy of the Soviet Countryside: Collectivization and Dekulakization: Documents and Materials in 5 Volumes] Lead editor with Roberta Manning and Lynne Viola. Moscow: ROSSPEN, 1999–2006.
- Социализация земли в России. [The Socialization of Land in Russia] Novosibirsk, 2001.
- The War Against the Peasantry, 1927–1930: The Tragedy of the Soviet Countryside. Co-editor with Lynne Viola, N.A. Ivnitskii, and Denis Kozlov. New Haven, CT: Yale University Press, 2005.
