= Stalinist era (disambiguation) =

The Stalinist era is the period of the History of the Soviet Union (1927–1953) under the rule of Joseph Stalin.

Stalinist era or Stalinist Era may also refer to:

- Stalinism in Poland
- The Stalinist Era, a 2018 book by David L. Hoffmann
