= Martin McCauley =

Martin McCauley may refer to:

- Martin McCauley, one of the Colombia Three
- Martin McCauley (historian) (born 1934), British historian
