= Oleg Khlevniuk =

Russian historian

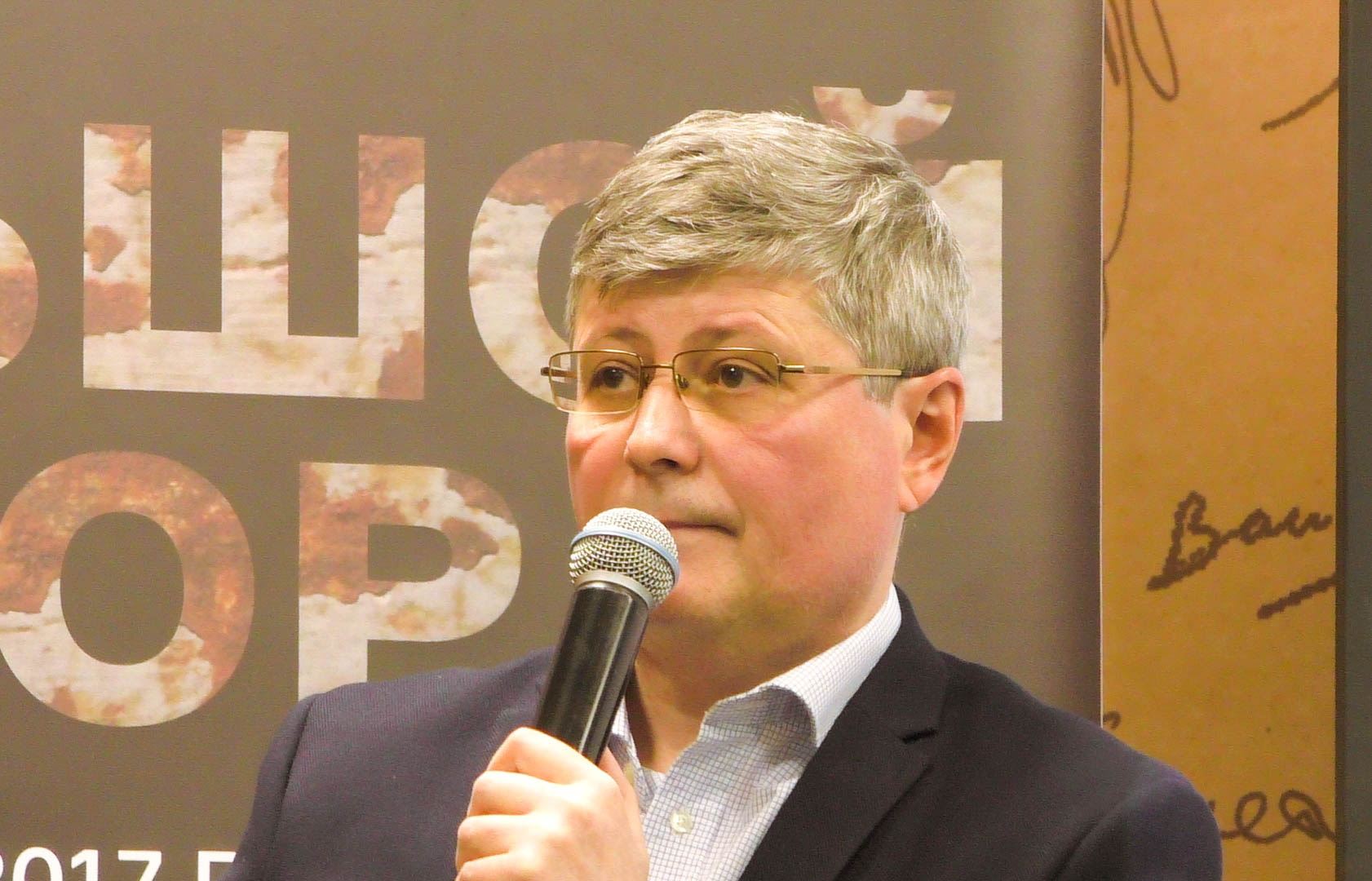
Oleg Khlevniuk in 2017.

Oleg Vitalyevich Khlevniuk (Russian: Олег Витальевич Хлевнюк; born 7 July 1959 in Vinnytsia, Ukrainian SSR) is a Russian historian of the Soviet Union.

== Career ==
He completed his Candidate of Sciences thesis on cultural change among Soviet urban workers between 1926–1939 at the Institute of History of the Academy of Sciences of the Soviet Union in 1986.

He taught at the history department of Moscow State University and is currently a professor at the Higher School of Economics.

== Research and views ==
He has authored a number of books on the Soviet Union under Joseph Stalin and the Gulag system. A review by The Times Literary Supplement described him as "one of a now endangered species: a Russian historian who collaborates with Western scholars and funding bodies to produce objective studies based on newly published documents", but criticized Khlevniuk for dismissing everything that has not been directly proven by archival documents.

His outlook on Soviet history is placed by Lewis Siegelbaum within the "neo-totalitarian" school.

== Reception ==
He is a recipient, together with Yoram Gorlizki, of the 2004 Alec Nove Prize, awarded by the British Association for Slavonic & East European Studies, for their book Cold Peace: Stalin and the Soviet Ruling Circle, 1945–1953.

He received the Enlightener Prize in 2023.

== Works ==
=== Books authored/edited ===
- (with Vladimir A. Kozlov) Начинается с человека. Человеческий фактор в социалистическом строительстве. Итоги и уроки 30-х годов (1988)
- The History of the Gulag: From Collectivization to the Great Terror (1990)
- 1937-й. Сталин, НКВД и советское общество (1992)
- (with R. W. Davies) The role of Gosplan in economic decision-making in the 1930s (1993)
- Сталин и Орджоникидзе. Конфликты в Политбюро в 30-е годы (1993)
  - English translation: In Stalin's Shadow: The Career of "Sergo" Ordzhonikidze (1995)
- Политбюро. Механизмы политической власти в 30-е годы (1996)
  - French translation: Le Cercle du Kremlin : Staline et le Bureau politique dans les années 30 : les jeux du pouvoir (1996)
  - German translation: Das Politbüro. Mechanismen der politischen Macht in der Sowjetunion der dreissiger Jahre (1998)
- (with Yoram Gorlizki) Cold Peace: Stalin and the Soviet Ruling Circle, 1945–1953 (2004)
  - Russian edition: Холодный мир. Сталин и завершение сталинской диктатуры (2011)
- (ed., with Leonid I. Borodkin and Paul Gregory) ГУЛАГ. Экономика принудительного труда (2005)
- Master of the House: Stalin and His Inner Circle (2009)
  - Russian edition: Хозяин. Сталин и утверждение сталинской диктатуры (2010)
- Stalin: New Biography of a Dictator (2015)
  - Russian edition: Сталин. Жизнь одного вождя (2015)
- (with R.W. Davies, Mark Harrison and Stephen G. Wheatcroft) The Industrialisation of Soviet Russia, vol. 7: The Soviet Economy and the Approach of War, 1937–1939 (2018)
- (with Yoram Gorlizki) Substate Dictatorship: Networks, Loyalty, and Institutional Change in the Soviet Union (2020)
- Корпорация самозванцев. Теневая экономика и коррупция в сталинском СССР (2023)

=== Sources published ===
- Сталинское Политбюро в 30-е годы. Сборник документов (1995)
- (with Lars T. Lih and Oleg V. Naumov) Stalin's Letters to Molotov, 1925–36 (1995)
- (with Viktor P. Danilov, Aleksandr Yu. Vatlin et al.) Как ломали НЭП. Стенограммы пленумов ЦК ВКП(б) 1928-1929 гг. (2000, 5 vols.)
- Сталин и Каганович. Переписка 1931-1936 гг. (2001)
  - abridged English edition (with R.W. Davies et al.): The Stalin-Kaganovich Correspondence 1931–36 (2003)
- (with A.Ya. Livshin et al.) Письма во власть, 1928-1939. Заявления, жалобы, доносы, письма в государственные структуры и советским вождям (2002)
- (with others) Политбюро ЦК ВКП(б) и Совет Министров СССР, 1945-1953 (2002)
- (with Vladimir A. Kozlov and Sergey V. Mironenko) Заключенные на стройках коммунизма. ГУЛАГ и объекты энергетики в СССР (2006)
- (with others) Региональная политика Н.С. Хрущева. ЦК КПСС и местные партийные комитеты, 1953-1964 гг. (2009)
- (with Lyudmila P. Kosheleva et al.) Советская национальная политика. Идеология и практики 1945-1953 (2013)
- (with Marina Astakhova et al.) Государственный комитет обороны СССР. Постановления и деятельность, 1941-1945 гг. Аннотированный каталог (2015, 2 vols.)
- (with Lyudmila P. Kosheleva and Larisa A. Rogovaya) Советское военно-политическое руководство в годы Великой Отечественной войны. Государственный Комитет Обороны СССР, Политбюро ЦК ВКП(б), Совет народных комиссаров СССР. Сборник документов (2020)
