= Roberta T. Manning =

American historian (1940–2018)

- Born: January 24, 1940 (age 86); Austin, Texas, U.S.
- Died: January 3, 2018 (aged 77); Newton, Massachusetts, U.S.
- Children: 2
- Awards: Herbert Baxter Adams Prize (1983); Guggenheim Fellowship (1988)

Academic background
- Education: Rice University (BA); Columbia University (MA and PhD)
- Thesis: The Russian provincial gentry in revolution and counterrevolution, 1905-07 (1975)

Academic work
- Discipline: Soviet history
- Institutions: Boston College

Roberta Thompson Manning (January 24, 1940 – January 3, 2018) was an American historian. Specializing in the history and politics of the USSR, she won the 1983 Herbert Baxter Adams Prize for her book The Crisis of the Old Order in Russia and was a 1988 Guggenheim Fellow. She worked as a professor at Boston College for almost four decades.

== Biography ==
Manning was born on January 24, 1940, in Austin, Texas, daughter of Lucille Luby and Robert B. Thompson, and raised in Corpus Christi, Texas. She attended Rice University, where she got a BA in 1962, and Columbia University, where she got an MA in 1967 and a PhD in 1975. Her doctoral dissertation was The Russian provincial gentry in revolution and counterrevolution, 1905-07. She was a 1976 Harvard Russian Research Center Research fellow and a 1977-1978 Russian Institute Fellow, as well as a 1983-1984 National Endowment for the Humanities Fellow.

After serving as an acting assistant professor of history at the University of California, San Diego, Manning joined Boston College in 1975. She was promoted from assistant professor to associate professor in 1981, eventually becoming full professor. In 2013, she retired from Boston College.

Manning specialized in the history and politics of the USSR. She won the 1983 Herbert Baxter Adams Prize for her book The Crisis of the Old Order in Russia. In 1988, she was awarded a Guggenheim Fellowship "for a study of politics and society in the Soviet countryside, 1935-1941". She co-edited the 1993 essay volume Stalinist Terror. She led the multinational research team behind the multi-volume set The Tragedy of the Soviet Village. She also appeared as a media expert on Russian politics before and after the collapse of the Soviet Union.

Manning died on January 3, 2018, in her home in Newton, Massachusetts, following years of Alzheimer's disease. She was 77. She had two daughters and three grandsons.

== Bibliography ==
- The Crisis of the Old Order in Russia (1983) (Note: Reviews of this book:)
- (ed. with J. Arch Getty) Stalinist Terror (1993) (Note: Reviews of this book:)
