= J. Arch Getty =

American historian (1950–2025)

John Archibald Getty III (November 30, 1950 – May 19, 2025) was an American historian and professor at the University of California, Los Angeles (UCLA), who specialized in the history of Russia and the history of the Soviet Union.

== Life and career ==
Getty was born in Louisiana and grew up in Oklahoma. He received his Bachelor of Arts degree from the University of Pennsylvania in 1972 and his Ph.D. from Boston College in 1979. Getty was a professor at the University of California, Riverside, before he moved to UCLA.

Getty was a John Simon Guggenheim Fellow and a research fellow of the Russian State University for the Humanities (Moscow) and was senior fellow of the Harriman Institute (Columbia University) and the Davis Center (Harvard University). He was senior visiting scholar at the Russian Academy of Sciences in Moscow.

Getty died in Santa Monica, California on May 19, 2025, at the age of 74.

== Research, ideas, and debates ==
Academic Sovietology after World War II and during the Cold War was dominated by the "totalitarian model" of the Soviet Union, stressing the absolute nature of Joseph Stalin's power. The "revisionist school" beginning in the 1960s focused on relatively autonomous institutions which might influence policy at the higher level. Matt Lenoe described the "revisionist school" as representing those who "insisted that the old image of the Soviet Union as a totalitarian state bent on world domination was oversimplified or just plain wrong. They tended to be interested in social history and to argue that the Communist Party leadership had had to adjust to social forces." Getty was one of a number of "revisionist school" historians who challenged the traditional approach to Soviet history, as outlined by political scientist Carl Joachim Friedrich, which stated that the Soviet Union was a totalitarian system, with the personality cult and almost unlimited powers of the "great leader" such as Stalin.

In Origins of the Great Purges, a book published in 1985, Getty said that the Soviet political system was not completely controlled from the center and that Stalin only responded to political events as they arose. The book was a challenge to works by Robert Conquest and part of the debates between the "totalitarian model" and "revisionist school" of the Soviet Union. In an appendix to the book, Getty also questioned the previously published findings that Stalin organized himself the murder of Sergey Kirov to justify his campaign of Great Purge. Getty saw Stalin's rule as dictatorial but not totalitarian because the latter demanded an administrative and technological effectiveness that did not exist. (Note: Regarding the 1936 Soviet Constitution, Getty wrote: "Many who lauded Stalin's Soviet Union as the most democratic country on earth lived to regret their words. After all, the Soviet Constitution of 1936 was adopted on the eve of the Great Terror of the late 1930s; the 'thoroughly democratic' elections to the first Supreme Soviet permitted only uncontested candidates and took place at the height of the savage violence in 1937. The civil rights, personal freedoms, and democratic forms promised in the Stalin constitution were trampled almost immediately and remained dead letters until long after Stalin's death.")

The "totalitarian model" historians objected to the "revisionist school" of historians such as Getty as apologetics for Stalin and accused them of downplaying the terror. Lenoe responded that "Getty has not denied Stalin's ultimate responsibility for the Terror, nor is he an admirer of Stalin." During the debates in the 1980s, the use of émigré sources and the insistence on Stalin's engineering of Kirov's murder became embedded in the two sides' position. In a review of Conquest's work on the Soviet famine of 1932–1933, especially The Harvest of Sorrow, Getty wrote that while Stalin and the Soviet Politburo were primarily responsible, "there is plenty of blame to go around. It must be shared by the tens of thousands of activists and officials who carried out the policy and by the peasants who chose to slaughter animals, burn fields, and boycott cultivation in protest."

In a 1987 review for the London Review of Books (LRB) about Conquest's work, Getty wrote: "Conquest's hypothesis, sources and evidence are not new. Indeed, he himself first put forward his view two years ago in a work sponsored by the American Enterprise Institute. The intentional famine story, however, has been an article of faith for Ukrainian émigrés in the West since the Cold War. ... Conquest's book will thus give a certain academic credibility to a theory which has not been generally accepted by non-partisan scholars outside the circles of exiled nationalities. In today's conservative political climate, with its 'evil empire' discourse, I am sure that the book will be very popular." In the same LRB article, Getty gave his interpretation of the events, (Note: Getty wrote: "Stalin gave his backing to radicals in the Party who saw the mixed economy of the Twenties as an unwarranted concession to capitalism. These leftists, for whom Stalin was spokesman and leader, argued that the free market in grain confronted the state with an unpredictable, inefficient and expensive food supply. ... These radical activists, who became the shock troops of the voluntarist 'Stalin Revolution' which swept the Soviet Union in the Thirties, were concentrated in working-class and youth groups. ... The collectivisation of agriculture from 1929 to about 1934 proceeded in several fitful campaigns characterised by confusion, lurches to left and right, and the substitution of enthusiasm, exhortation and violence for careful planning. Hard-line officials and volunteers forced reluctant peasants into improvised collective farms. Peasants resisted by slaughtering animals and refusing to plant, harvest or market grain. Neither side would give way. By 1934 the Stalinists had won, at least insofar as the collective farm system was permanently established, but they had paid a painful price: catastrophic livestock losses, social dislocation and, in some places, famine. Millions of people died from starvation, deportation and violence.") which is in line with the "revisionist school" bottom-up approach.

With the dissolution of the Soviet Union and the release of the Soviet archives, some of the heat has gone out of the debate, as "totalitarian model" and "revisionist" school merged into "postrevisionism" as a synthesis. Getty was one of the most active Western historians researching the archives along with Lynne Viola. A 1993 study of archival data by Getty et al. showed that a total of 1,053,829 people died in the Gulag from 1934 to 1953. In a 1993 study, Getty wrote that the opening of the Soviet archives has vindicated the lower estimates put forth by the "revisionist school" scholars. His analysis of Stalin as powerful but having at least in his early rule, to work within an array of competing interests and powers, a cruel but ordinary mortal being who was not omnipotent nor a master planner, has been described as a representation of the banal evil described by Hannah Arendt.

== Published works ==
=== Books ===
- Getty, J. Arch; Manning, Roberta Thompson, eds. (1993). Stalinist Terror: New Perspectives. Cambridge University Press. ISBN 0-521-44670-8.
- Getty, J. Arch; Naumov, Oleg V. (1993). The Central Party Archive: A Research Guide. Center for Russian and East European Studies at the University of Pittsburgh. ISBN 99944-868-6-1
- Getty, J. Arch (1996) [1985]. Origins of the Great Purges: The Soviet Communist Party Reconsidered, 1933–1938 (9th reprint ed.). Cambridge University Press. ISBN 0-521-33570-1.
- Getty, J. Arch; Naumov, Oleg V. (1999). The Road to Terror: Stalin and the Self-Destruction of the Bolsheviks, 1932–1939. Yale University Press. ISBN 0-300-09403-5.
- Getty, J. Arch; Naumov, Oleg V. (2008). Yezhov : The Rise of Stalin's "Iron Fist" Yale University Press. ISBN 0-300-09205-9.
- Getty, J. Arch (2013). Practicing Stalinism: Bolsheviks, Boyars, and the Persistence of Tradition. Yale University Press. ISBN 0-300-16929-9.

=== Articles ===
- Getty, J. Arch (January 1986). "Trotsky in Exile: The Founding of the Fourth International". Soviet Studies. XXXVIII (1): 24–35.
- Getty, J. Arch (1991). "State and Society Under Stalin: Constitutions and Elections in the 1930s". Slavic Review, vol 50, no.1, pp. 18-35
- Getty, J. Arch; Ritterspon, Gabor T.; Zemskov, Viktor N. (October 1993). "Victims of the Soviet Penal System in the Prewar Years: A First Approach on the Basis of Archival Evidence". The American Historical Review. 98 (4): 1017–1049.
- Getty, J. Arch (1998). "Afraid of Their Shadows: The Bolshevik Recourse to Terror, 1932–1938". In Hildermeier, Manfred; Mueller-Luckner, Elisabeth, eds. Stalinismus vor dem Zweiten Weltkrieg. Neue Wege der Forschung [Stalinism before the Second World War (New Avenues of Research)]. De Gruyter Oldenbourg.
- Getty, J. Arch (January 1999). "Samokritika Rituals in the Stalinist Central Committee, 1933–1938". The Russian Review. 58 (1): 49–70.
- Getty, J. Arch (2000). "Mr. Ezhov Goes to Moscow: The Rise of a Stalinist Police Chief". In Husband, William, ed. The Human Tradition in Modern Russia. Rowman & Littlefield. pp. 157–174.
- Getty, J. Arch (January 2002). "'Excesses Are not Permitted:' Mass Terror Operations in the Late 1930s and Stalinist Governance". The Russian Review. 16 (1): 112–137.
- Getty, J. Arch (2005). "Stalin as Prime Minister: Power and the Politburo". In Davies, Sarah; Harris, James, eds. Stalin: A New History. Cambridge University Press. pp. 83–107.
