= New Directions =

New Directions may refer to:

== Music ==
- New Directions (Jack DeJohnette album), 1978
- New Directions (The Meters album), 1977
- New Directions (Tavares album), 1982

== Other uses ==
- New Directions Publishing, an American publishing company
- "New Directions" (Glee), a 2014 TV episode
- New Directions, the show choir that is the subject of the TV series Glee

== See also ==
- New Direction (disambiguation)
