= New Direction =

New Direction may refer to:

- "New Direction" (song), by S Club Juniors, 2002
- New Direction (think tank), a European political foundation based in Brussels, Belgium
- New Direction (comics), an imprint of EC Comics

== See also ==
- New Directions (disambiguation)
