= Michael Kort =

American historian (born 1944)

Michael Kort (born 1944) is an American historian, academic, and author who studies and has written extensively about the history of the Soviet Union. He teaches at Boston University.

== Biography ==
Michael Kort was born in 1944. He received a B.A. in history from Johns Hopkins University, and an M.A. and Ph.D. in Russian history from New York University.

He lives in Massachusetts.

== Bibliography ==
=== Biographies ===
- Mikhail Gorbachev
- Nikita Khrushchev

=== Textbooks ===
- The Soviet Union: History, Culture, Geography
- The Soviet Colossus: A History of the U.S.S.R., 1985
- Modernization and Revolution in China (co‑author with June Grasso and Jay Corrin), 1991
- The Columbia Guide to the Cold War, 1998
- The Columbia Guide to Hiroshima and the Bomb, 2007

=== Other nonfiction ===
- The Rise and Fall of the Soviet Union, 1992
- Marxism in Power, 1993
- A Brief History of Russia, 2008
- The Vietnam War Reexamined, 2017
- Weapons of Mass Destruction
- The Handbook of the Middle East
- Russia (Nations in Transition)
- Central Asian Republics (Nations in Transition)
