= Martin McCauley (historian) =

Irish historian

Martin McCauley (born 18 October 1934) is an Irish historian and former senior lecturer at the School of Slavonic and East European Studies, at University College London. He is a member of the Limehouse Group of Analysts and a regular commentator in the media on Russian affairs.

== Early life ==
Martin McCauley was born on 18 October 1934 in Omagh, Northern Ireland. He studied at the University of Westminster (1953-6); University of London (1962-8); University of Paris (Sorbonne) (1961); University of Perugia (Italy) (summer 1962, 63); Timiryazev Agricultural Academy, Moscow, Russia (1969); Teachers' University, Beijing, China (1988).

His academic qualifications include a Diploma in Surveying (Westminster); BA, PhD (London), Diplôme d’études de civilisation française (Sorbonne). He is also a chartered surveyor and a Member of the Royal Institution of Chartered Surveyors (MRICS).

== Career ==
McCauley trained as a surveyor. He is also a former senior lecturer at the School of Slavonic and East European Studies, at University College London. He is a member of the Limehouse Group of Analysts.

== Selected publications ==
=== 1970s ===
- The Russian Revolution and the Soviet State, 1917-1921: Documents. Barnes & Noble, London, 1975. (Studies in Russia and East Europe)
- Khrushchev and the Development of Soviet Agriculture: The Debate on the Virgin Lands, 1953-64. Macmillan, London, 1976.
- Communist power in Europe, 1944-1949. 1979. (Editor) (Studies in Russian and East European History)
- Marxism-Leninism in the German Democratic Republic the Socialist Unity Party (SED). 1979. (Studies in Russia and East Europe)
- The Stalin File, London 1979 96pp.

=== 1980s ===
- Editor and Translator Gerda and Hermann Weber, Lenin, Life and Works, London 1980 224pp.
- Editor Maximilien Rubel, Marx, Life and Works, London 1980 140pp
- East Germany: The Dilemmas of Division, London 1980 19pp.
- The Soviet Union Since 1917. Longman, London, 1981. (Longman History of Russia)
- East Germany: The Dilemmas of Division, London 1980 19pp.
- Power and Authority in East Germany: The Socialist Unity Party (SED), London 1981 28pp.
- Stalin and Stalinism, London 1983 136pp.
- The Origins of the Cold War, London 1983 144pp.
- The German Democratic Republic Since 1945. 1983. (Studies in Russia and East Europe)
- The Soviet Union After Brezhnev. 1983.
- Stalin and Stalinism. Longman, London, 1983. (Seminar Studies in History)
- Octobrists to Bolsheviks: Imperial Russia, 1905-17. 1984. (Documents of Modern History)
- Trade and Transport in Russia and Eastern Europe, London 1985 107pp. Edited with J E O Screen
- Leadership and Succession in the Soviet Union, Eastern Europe and China, New York and London 1986 256pp. Editor (with S Carter) and contributor
- Khrushchev and Khrushchevism. 1987. (Studies in Russia and East Europe)
- East-West German Relations: A Turning Point?, London 1983 19pp
- The Soviet Union Under Gorbachev. 1987. (Studies in Russia and East Europe)
- The Emergence of the Modern Russian State, 1855-81. 1988. (Studies in Russia and East Europe)

=== 1990s ===
- Gorbachev and Perestroika, New York and London 1990 222pp. Editor and contributor
- Nikita Khrushchev. Abacus, 1991. (Makers of the Twentieth Century Series)
- Directory of Russian MPs, People's Deputies of the Supreme Soviet of Russia-Russian Federation London 1992 liii+326pp Editor and contributor
- The Soviet Union 1917-1991 London 1993 xvii+422 pp. (Second edition of The Soviet Union since 1917, London 1981)
- Longman Biographical Directory of Decision-Makers in Russia and the Successor States London 1993 xxvi+726 pp. Editor and Contributor
- Russia's Leading Commercial Banks Seattle 1994 i+177 pp. Editor and Contributor
- Stalin and Stalinism, London 1995, 2nd edition, xiii+142pp
- The Origins of the Cold War, London 1995, 2nd edition, xi+153pp
- The Khrushchev Era: 1953-64. Longman, London, 1995. (Seminar Studies in History)
- The Origins of the Cold War 1941-49. Longman, London, 1995. (Seminar Studies in History)
- Investing in the Caspian Sea Region: Opportunity and Risk, London 1996, x+97pp Editor and Contributor
- Russia 1917-1941. Sempringham, 1997. (Sempringham Studies)
- The Longman Companion to Russia Since 1914. Longman, 1997. (Longman Companions to History) ISBN 0582276403
- Who's Who in Russia Since 1900. 1997.
- Gorbachev. 1998. (Profiles in Power)
- Russia, America and the Cold War: 1949-1991. Longman, London, 1998. (Seminar Studies in History)
- Rusia, America si Razboiul Rece, 1949-1991, Bucharest, 1999, 199pp. (Romanian edition of Russia, America and the Cold War, 1949-1991)

=== 2000s ===
- Afghanistan and Central Asia: A Modern History: A Short History. Pearson Education, London, 2002.
- Stalin and Stalinism, London 2003 3rd ed. xxix+172pp
- The Origins of the Cold War 1941-1949, London 2003 3rd ed. xx+158p
- Stalin e Lo Stalinismo, Bologna, 2003, rev. ed. 199pp
- Russia, America and the Cold War, 1949-1991, London 2004, 2nd ed. xxxvii+193pp
- Afganistan ja Kesk-Aasia Nüüdisajalugu, Tallinn, 2003 (Estonian edition of Afghanistan and Central Asia)
- The Rise and Fall of the Soviet Union, London 2007, xxix+522pp
- Bandits, Gangsters and the Mafia: Russia, the Baltic States and the CIS Since 1992. 2007
- Banditi, Gangsteri I Mafiyta (Sofia 2007) (Bulgarian edition of Bandits, Gangsters and the Mafia)
- Narodziny I Upadek Zwiazku Radzieckiego, Warsaw 2010, 544pp (Polish edition of The Rise and Fall of the Soviet Union)
- Stalin a Obdobi Stalinismu (Brno 2012) (Czech edition of Stalin and Stalinism)
- Origins of the Cold War 1941-1949, 4th ed. London 2015 xxvi + 216pp
- The Cold War 1949-2016, London 2017 xiv + 377pp
