= David L. Hoffmann =

American historian

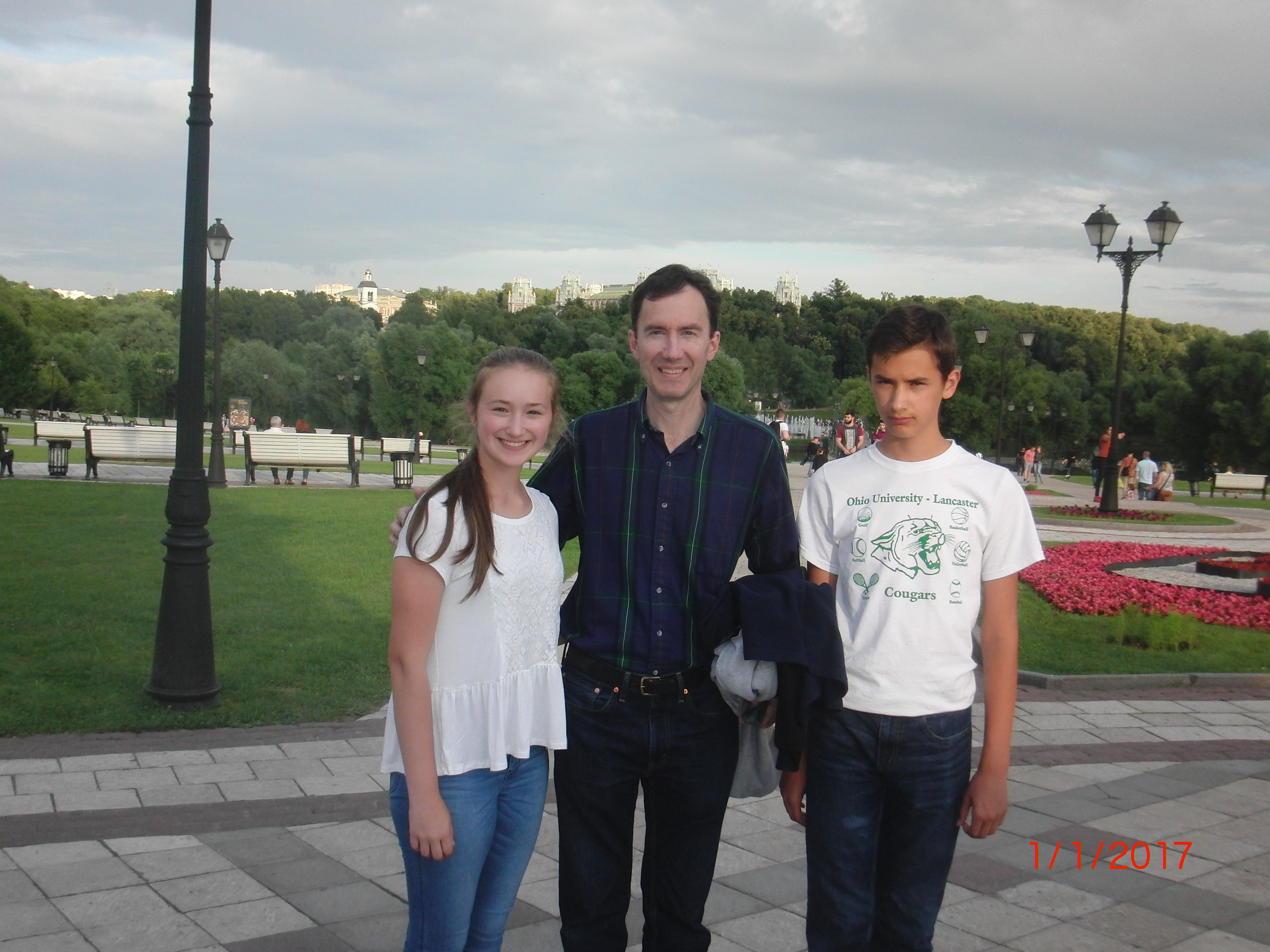

David L. Hoffmann is a Distinguished Professor, an American historian, and an expert in Russian, Soviet, and East European history. His other interests include Environment, Health, Technology, and Science, as well as Power, Culture, and the State. Since 2017 he has been Arts and Sciences Distinguished Professor of History at the Ohio State University.

== Education ==
- B.A. in history, Lawrence University, (1983)
- M.A. in Russian history, Columbia University, (1986)
- Ph.D. in Russian history, Columbia University, (1990)

== Books ==
=== Monographs ===
- (in progress) The Motherland Calls: War, Gender, and Memory in the Soviet Union, 1941-1991
- The Stalinist Era (2018)
- Forthcoming: Russian translation
- Spanish translation: La Era de Stalin (2019)
- Cultivating the Masses: Modern State Practices and Soviet Socialism, 1914-1939 (2011)
- Stalinist Values: The Cultural Norms of Soviet Modernity, 1917-1941 (2003)
- Peasant Metropolis: Social Identities in Moscow, 1929-1941 (1994) (Ohio Academy of History award for best book)

=== Edited volumes ===
- Stalinism: The Essential Readings (2002)
- Russian Modernity: Politics, Knowledge, Practices (2000)

== Awards ==
- Ohio State University Distinguished Teaching Award (2013)
- Phi Alpha Theta Teaching Award (2010 and 2017)
- Ohio Academy of History Book Award (1995)
