= Sarah Davies (historian) =

British historian

Sarah Davies is a historian specializing in the Soviet Union during the Stalin era. She is a professor of history at Durham University in Durham, England, United Kingdom, and currently serves as chair of the History Department.

Davies received the Alec Nove Prize for her first book, Popular Opinion in Stalin's Russia, which was translated into Russian in 2011. Along with James Harris, she is the author of the 2015 Stalin's World: Dictating the Soviet Order. Funded by the Arts and Humanities Research Council, the book draws on Stalin's personal archives and previously unstudied diaries of people close to him to explain how he understood the world. The authors argue that Stalin was not a paranoid driven by irrational fears; instead, his beliefs were shaped by misperceptions stemming in part from flawed intelligence. Davies is currently working on a book on British and Soviet cultural diplomacy during the Cold War.

== Bibliography ==
- Popular Opinion in Stalin's Russia. Terror, Propaganda and Dissent, 1934–1941, Cambridge University Press, 1997
- editor, with James Harris, Stalin: A New History, Cambridge University Press, 2005
- Stalin's World: Dictating the Soviet Order, jointly authored with James Harris, Yale University Press, 2015
