= Lynne Viola =

Scholar on the Soviet Union (born 1955)

- Born: 1955 (age 70–71)
- Citizenship: Canadian
- Education: Barnard College (1978); Princeton University (1984)
- Occupation: University professor
- Writing career
- Language: English
- Period: 20th century
- Subject: Russian history
- Notable awards: Thomas Henry Pentland Molson Prize

Lynne Viola (born 1955) is a scholar on the Soviet Union. She is a professor at the University of Toronto and has written four books and 30 articles.

== Early life ==
Raised in Nutley, New Jersey, she graduated from Nutley High School in 1973.

Viola graduated from Barnard College in 1978 and received a Ph.D. from Princeton University in 1984.

== Awards and honours ==
In 2014, she was inducted into the Royal Society of Canada. In 2018, she was the recipient of the Thomas Henry Pentland Molson Prize. In 2019, she was awarded a Killam Prize.

== Publications ==
- The Best Sons of the Fatherland: Workers in the Vanguard of Soviet Collectivization. Oxford University Press, 1987.
- Peasant Rebels Under Stalin: Collectivization and the Culture of Peasant Resistance. Oxford University Press, 1996.
- Contending with Stalinism: Soviet Power and Popular Resistance in the 1930s. Cornell University Press, 2002.
- The War Against the Peasantry, 1927–1930: The Tragedy of the Soviet Countryside (co-editor). Yale University Press, 2005.
- The Unknown Gulag: The Lost World of Stalin's Special Settlements. Oxford University Press, 2007.
- Stalinist Perpetrators on Trial: Scenes from the Great Terror in Soviet Ukraine. Oxford University Press, 2017.
