= A People's Tragedy =

1996 history book by Orlando Figes

A People's Tragedy: The Russian Revolution: 1891–1924
- Author: Orlando Figes
- Language: English
- Subject: Russian Revolution
- Genre: History
- Publisher: Jonathan Cape
- Publication date: 1996
- Publication place: United Kingdom
- Media type: Print (hardcover, paperback)
- Pages: 923
- ISBN: 0-224-04162-2
- LC Class: DK260.5F4

A People's Tragedy: The Russian Revolution, 1891–1924 is a book by the British historian Orlando Figes on the Russian Revolution and the preceding quarter of a century. Written between 1989 and 1996, it was published in 1996 and re-issued with a new introduction for the revolution's centenary in 2017.

== Approach ==
The book covers Russian history from the famine of 1891–1892, in which Figes sees the beginning of the final crisis of the Russian Empire, to the death of Lenin in 1924, when "the basic elements of the Stalinist regime – the one-party state, the system of terror and the cult of the personality – were all in place". According to Figes, "the whole of 1917 could be seen as a political battle between those who saw the revolution as a means of bringing the war to an end and those who saw the war as a means of bringing the revolution to an end".

Figes's viewpoint has been characterised as "liberal" due to his portrayal of both Tsarist and Bolshevik governments as brutal, inefficient and undemocratic. Particularly in the initial third of the book, which deals with the pre-revolutionary crisis, he aims to be equally critical of pre-1989 partisan notions of the political Left and Right. On the one hand, he rejects the left-wing interpretation of the revolution as an inevitable triumph of the working class. On the other, he acknowledges the proto-fascism of the Tsarist reaction. Among the protagonists of the book, the disillusioned "humanist" revolutionary Maxim Gorky and the first leader of the Provisional Government Georgy Lvov have been argued to represent positions shared by the book's author, in particular on the enduring vices of the Russian peasant and the political use of violence.

In line with his title, Figes offers an unqualifiedly negative assessment of the revolution due to its alleged failure to overcome the social inequality of the Tsarist era and its apparent unpopularity, expressed in various revolts against the Bolsheviks by 1921. He shows the Russian people in its violent desire for justice as both a victim and accomplice of the "tragedy", and explains, "The tragedy of the Russian Revolution was that the people were too weak politically to determine its outcome" (p. 588). The dominant colouring of the account has been described as "dark, at times completely black" and the attribution of the Russian people's incapacity for self-government to their deep-seated political and cultural legacy said to advance a fatalistic philosophy of history.

The argument is presented in the form of "a fairly traditional narrative history", with analytical interpretations of controversial historiographical points inserted at key intervals. In addition, a "humanist" technique of weaving individual life stories into its narrative structure is used.

While Figes's first book used archival sources to offer a structural analysis of Russian peasant society through the quantitative method, A People's Tragedy consciously departs from this approach and puts the anecdote first in its pursuit of the individual experience of the revolution. It synthesises the older political history and the social history of the 1970s–1980s, while seeking to reconcile both schools, with Figes's own archival findings on peasant society.

== Reception ==
A People's Tragedy won the Wolfson History Prize, the WH Smith Literary Award, the final NCR Book Award, the Longman/History Today Book Prize and the Los Angeles Times Book Prize. One reviewer contrasted the "aggressive promotion" of the book, which he considered "a market-driven piece of history", with the reception of its more scholarly predecessor, the "perceptive and path-breaking" Peasant Russia, Civil War (1989) by the same author. In 2008, The Times Literary Supplement listed A People's Tragedy as one of the "hundred most influential books since the war".

Eric Hobsbawm credited Figes's "very impressive piece of history-writing" with lasting value "not only as dramatic narrative, but as historical analysis". He highlighted the detailed study of the conditions behind peasant discontent and the attention given in the book to the peasant moral order, which to him formed "the programme of revolution". He welcomed Figes's dismissal of counterfactual fantasies about the transformation of Tsarism into "flourishing liberal capitalism", his demonstration of popular support for the Bolshevik seizure of power in October 1917 in contrast to the right-wing view of the revolution as a coup d'état that lacked popular support, and his tracing of the Red Terror to peasant desire for revenge against the upper classes. He praised the book as "far superior in historical understanding" to Simon Schama's Citizens, which had portrayed "the [French] Revolution as a catalogue of horrors", since it stopped short of "denunciations of revolutions as such". He criticised it for a lack of global and comparative perspective, and for failing to even sketch the political rise of Stalin or the Socialist Revolutionary Party. He attributed the "acute dislike" of Lenin and the Bolsheviks in the book to "the post-Soviet mood".

Richard J. Evans, Figes' predecessor at Birkbeck, characterised A People's Tragedy as "an almost self-consciously literary narrative of the Russian Revolution and Civil War, weaving in the stories of individuals, some of them very obscure, to the larger picture, and eschewing ... socioeconomic and statistical analysis", and thus an example of the unacknowledged "theoretical and methodological impact of postmodernism".

== Release details ==
- Figes, Orlando (1996). A People's Tragedy: The Russian Revolution: 1891–1924. London: Jonathan Cape. p. 923. ISBN 0-224-04162-2.
- Figes, Orlando (1997). A People's Tragedy: A History of the Russian Revolution. New York: Viking. p. 923. ISBN 0-670-85916-8. First American Edition

Further printings were issued by Pimlico in 1997 and by The Bodley Head in 2014.

A 47 hour audiobook edition of A People's Tragedy narrated by Roger Davis was released in 2018.

== See also ==
- Bibliography of the Russian Revolution and Civil War
- Outline of the Russian Revolution and Civil War
- Index of articles related to the Russian Revolution and Civil War
- Russia in Flames: War, Revolution, Civil War, 1914–1921 (also published in 2017)
- Russia in Revolution: An Empire in Crisis, 1890 to 1928 (also published in 2017)
- Russia: Revolution and Civil War, 1917—1921
- The Russian Revolution: A New History

== Bibliography ==
- Merridale, Catherine (1998), "Review of A People's Tragedy: A History of the Russian Revolution by Orlando Figes", The Historical Journal, 41 (1): 317–318, doi:10.1017/S0018246X97217607
- Read, Christopher (1997), "Back to the Future: The Return of the 'Dark People' (review of A People's Tragedy: A History of the Russian Revolution by Orlando Figes)", Revolutionary Russia, 10 (2): 87–92, doi:10.1080/09546549708575675
- Suny, Ronald Grigor (1999), "Review of A People's Tragedy: A History of the Russian Revolution by Orlando Figes", Journal of Modern History, 71 (1): 263–266, doi:10.1086/235245
- Zelnik, Reginald [in Polish] (1998), "Review of A People's Tragedy: A History of the Russian Revolution by Orlando Figes", Slavic Review, 57 (2): 453–455, doi:10.2307/2501883, JSTOR 2501883
