= Electrical telegraph =

Early system for transmitting text over wires

Electrical Telegraph
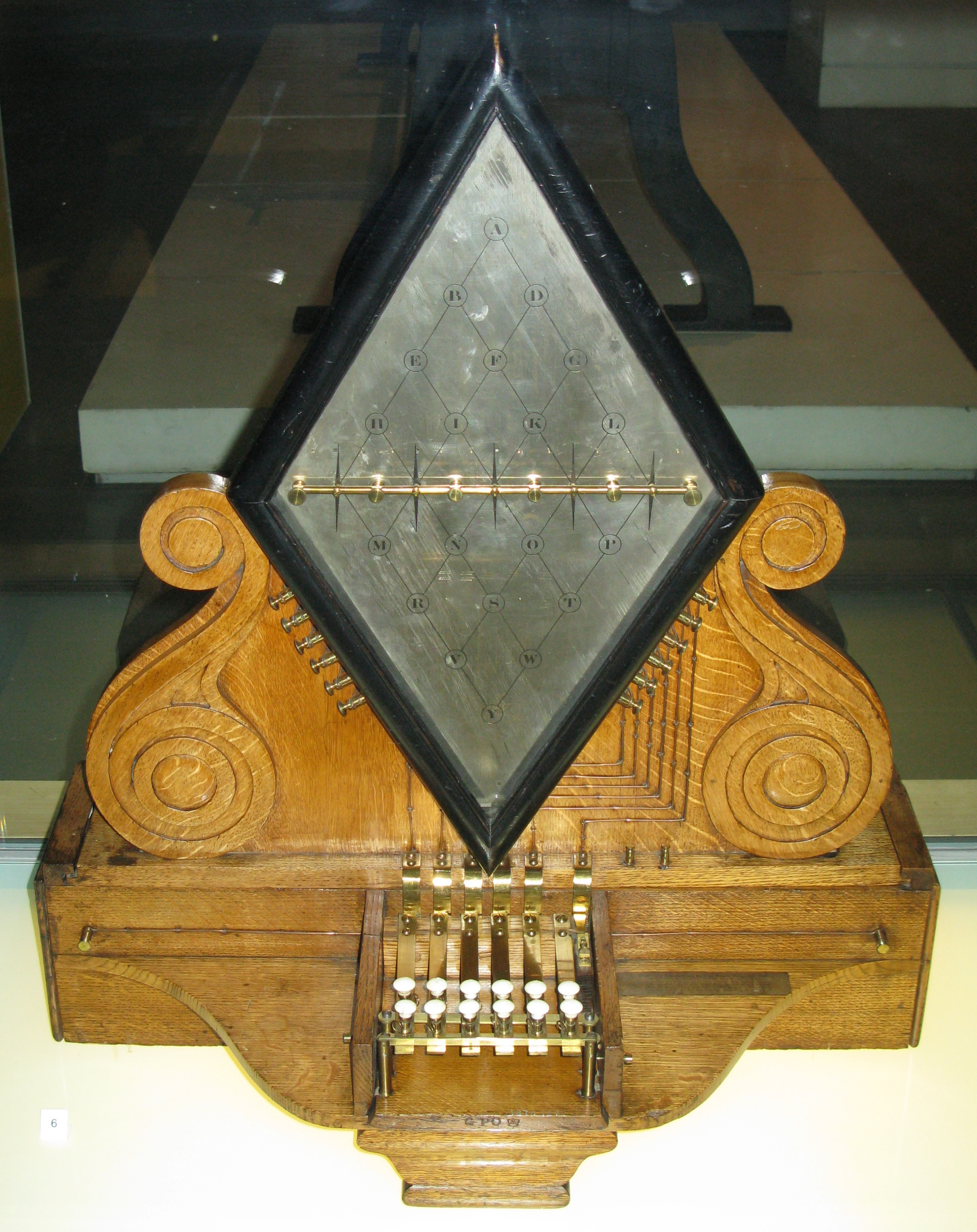
- A Cooke and Wheatstone five-needle telegraph instrument from 1837, one of the earliest commercial electrical telegraph designs.
- Type: Telecommunications system
- Inventor: Pavel Schilling; Carl Friedrich Gauss; Wilhelm Eduard Weber; William Fothergill Cooke; Charles Wheatstone; Samuel Morse
- Inception: 1830s (commercialization)
- Manufacturer: Various (including Western Union, Postal Telegraph Co., British GPO)
- Available: No
- Last production year: Late 20th century to early 21st century (replaced by digital networks)
- Notes; Generation: First-generation electronic communications Technical Specifications: Signaling Method: Morse code, needle deflection, printing/recording (e.g., Hughes, Baudot); Transmission Medium: Overhead copper/iron wires, insulated submarine cables (gutta-percha); Network Topology: Point-to-point, multidrop lines, store-and-forward switching centers Operating Voltage: Generally 50V to 150V DC (powered by chemical batteries like Daniell or Leclanché cells); Data Rate: ~5 to 40 words per minute (wpm) manual; up to 400+ wpm via automated systems (e.g., Wheatstone automatic telegraph) Hardware Components: Telegraph key, sounder, relay, galvanometer, paper tape registers

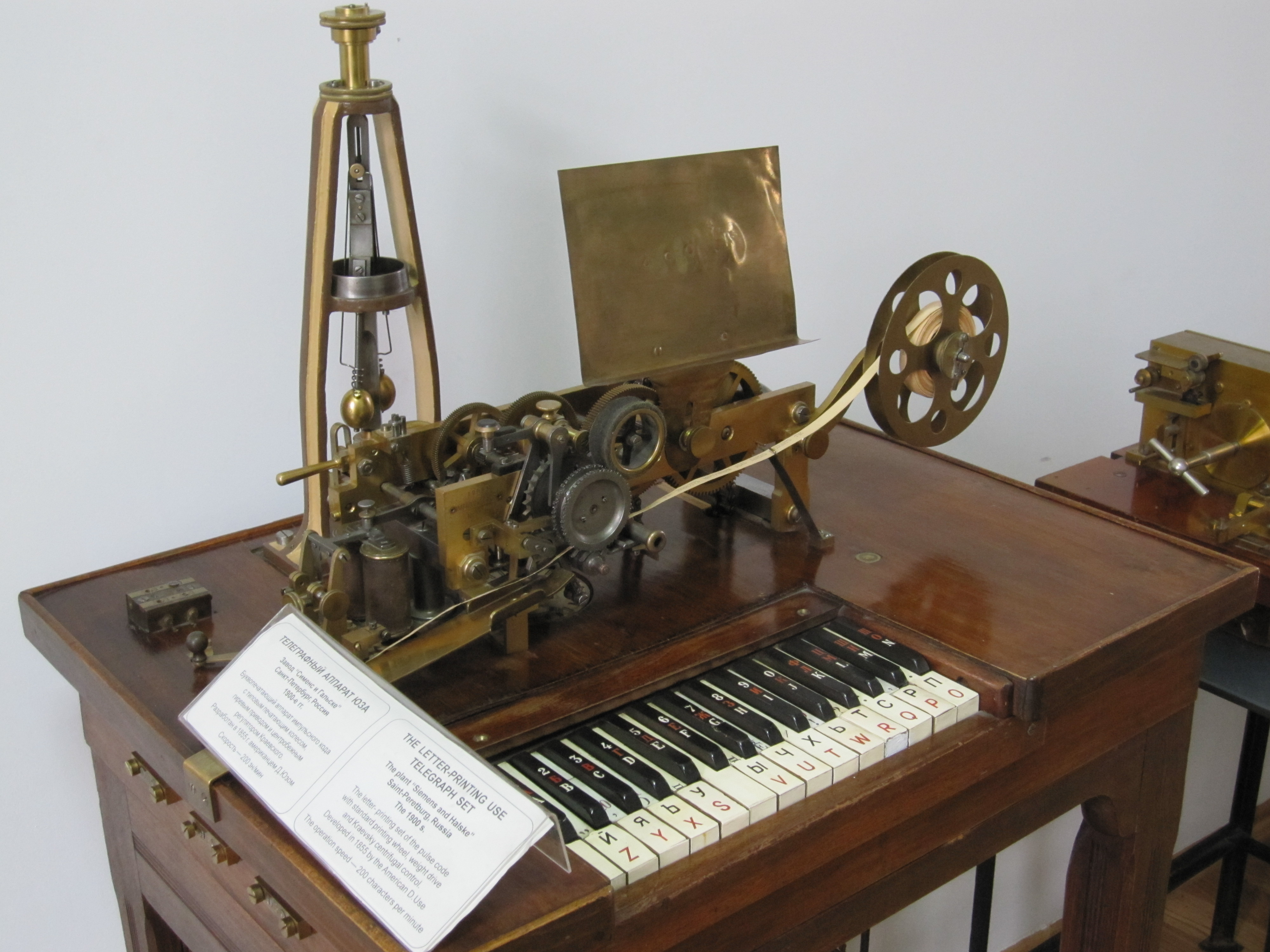
Hughes telegraph, an early (1855) teleprinter built by Siemens and Halske

Electrical telegraphy is point-to-point distance communicating via sending electric signals over wire, a system primarily used from the 1840s until the late 20th century. It was the first electrical telecommunications system and the most widely used of a number of early messaging systems called telegraphs, that were devised to send text messages more quickly than physically carrying them. Electrical telegraphy can be considered the first example of electrical engineering.

Electrical telegraphy consisted of two or more geographically separated stations, called telegraph offices. The offices were connected by wires, usually supported overhead on utility poles. Many electrical telegraph systems were invented that operated in different ways, but the ones that became widespread fit into two broad categories. First are the needle telegraphs, in which electric current sent down the telegraph line produces an electromagnetic force that moves a needle-shaped pointer into position over a printed list, in order to point to a specific item in that list (such as a letter of the alphabet). Early needle telegraph models used multiple needles, thus requiring multiple wires to be installed between stations. The first commercial needle telegraph system and the most widely used of its type was the Cooke and Wheatstone telegraph, invented in 1837. The second category are armature systems, in which the current activates a telegraph sounder that makes a click; communication on this type of system relies on sending clicks in coded rhythmic patterns. The archetype of this category was the Morse system and the code associated with it, both invented by American inventor and painter Samuel Morse in 1838. In 1865, the Morse system became the standard for international communication, using a modified form of Morse's code that had been developed for German railways.

Electrical telegraphs were used by the emerging railway companies to provide signals for train control systems, minimizing the chances of trains colliding with each other. This was built around the signalling block system in which signal boxes along the line communicate with neighbouring boxes by telegraphic sounding of single-stroke bells and three-position needle telegraph instruments.

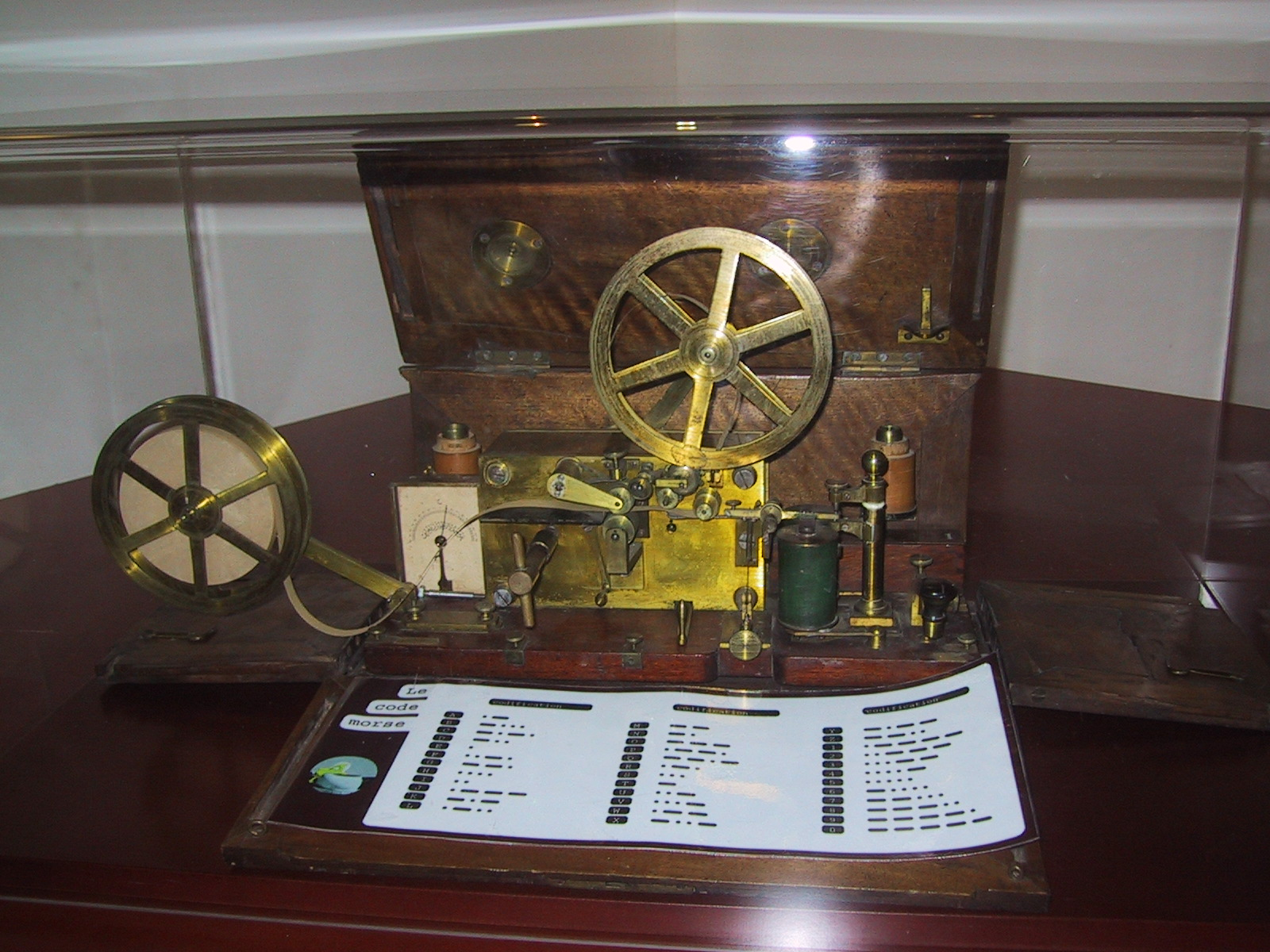
Morse telegraph

In the 1840s, the electrical telegraph superseded optical telegraph systems such as semaphores, becoming the standard way to send urgent messages. By the latter half of the century, most developed nations had commercial telegraph networks with local telegraph offices in most cities and towns, allowing the public to send messages (called telegrams) addressed to any person in the country, for a fee.

Beginning in 1850, submarine telegraph cables allowed for the first rapid communication between people on different continents. The telegraph's nearly-instant transmission of messages across continents – and between continents – had widespread social and economic impacts. The electric telegraph led to Guglielmo Marconi's invention of wireless telegraphy, the first means of radiowave telecommunication, which he began in 1894.

In the early 20th century, manual operation of telegraph machines was slowly replaced by teleprinter networks. Increasing use of the telephone pushed telegraphy into only a few specialist uses; its use by the general public dwindled to greetings for special occasions. The rise of the Internet and email in the 1990s largely made dedicated telegraphy networks obsolete.

== History ==
=== Early work ===
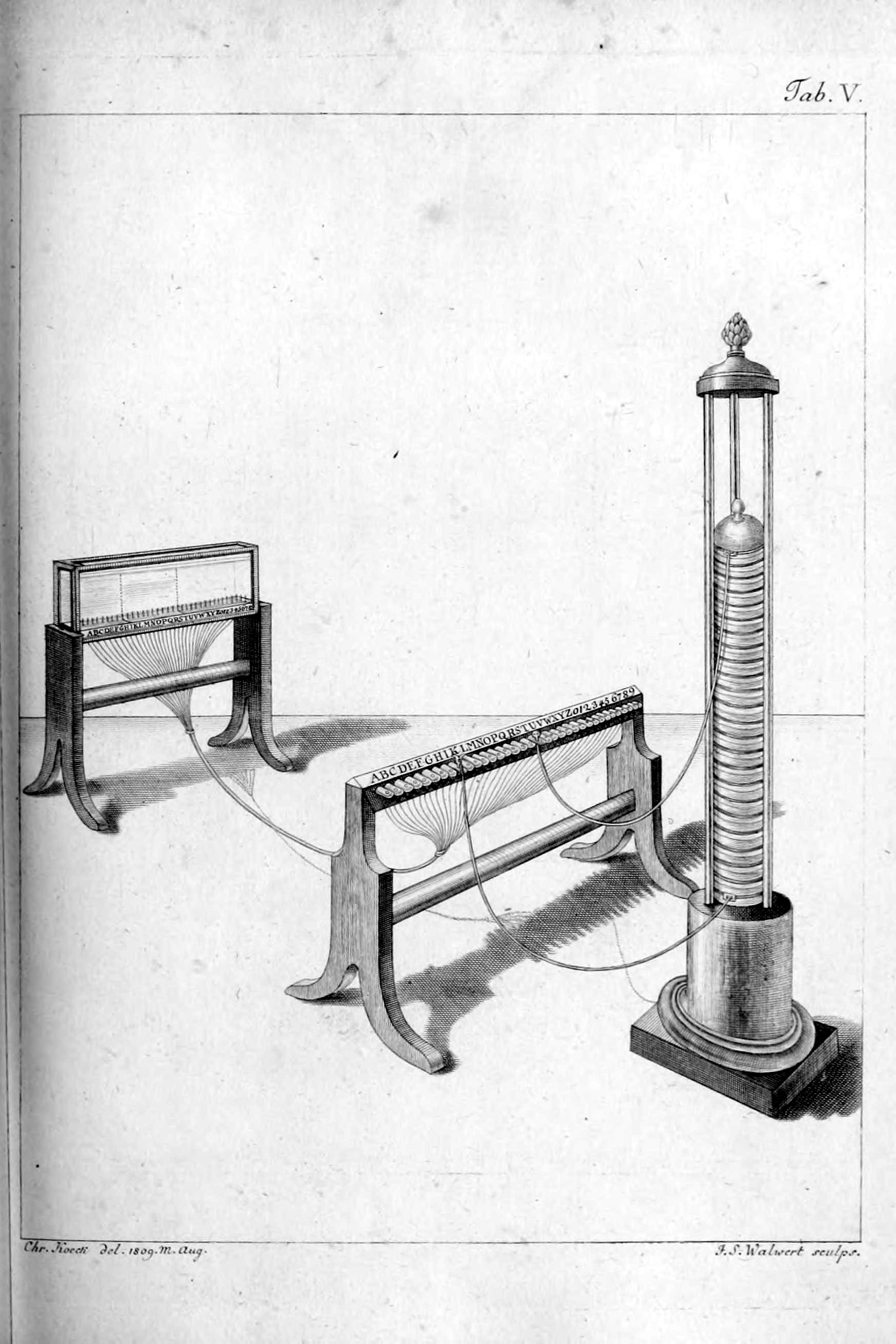
Sömmering's electric telegraph in 1809

From early studies of electricity, electrical phenomena were known to travel with great speed, and many experimenters worked on the application of electricity to communications at a distance. All the known effects of electricity – such as sparks, electrostatic attraction, chemical changes, electric shocks, and later electromagnetism – were applied to the problems of detecting controlled transmissions of electricity at various distances.

In 1753, an anonymous writer in the Scots Magazine suggested an electrostatic telegraph. Using one wire for each letter of the alphabet, a message could be transmitted by connecting the wire terminals in turn to an electrostatic machine, and observing the deflection of pith balls at the far end. The writer has never been positively identified, but the letter was signed C.M. and posted from Renfrew leading to a Charles Marshall of Renfrew being suggested. Telegraphs employing electrostatic attraction were the basis of early experiments in electrical telegraphy in Europe, but were abandoned as being impractical and were never developed into a useful communication system.

In 1774, Georges-Louis Le Sage realised an early electric telegraph. The telegraph had a separate wire for each of the 26 letters of the alphabet and its range was only between two rooms of his home.

In 1800, Alessandro Volta invented the voltaic pile, providing a continuous current of electricity for experimentation. This became a source of a low-voltage current that could be used to produce more distinct effects, and which was far less limited than the momentary discharge of an electrostatic machine, which with Leyden jars were the only previously known human-made sources of electricity.

Another very early experiment in electrical telegraphy was an "electrochemical telegraph" created by the German physician, anatomist and inventor Samuel Thomas von Sömmering in 1809, based on an earlier 1804 design by Spanish polymath and scientist Francisco Salva Campillo. Both their designs employed multiple wires (up to 35) to represent almost all Latin letters and numerals. Thus, messages could be conveyed electrically up to a few kilometers (in von Sömmering's design), with each of the telegraph receiver's wires immersed in a separate glass tube of acid. An electric current was sequentially applied by the sender through the various wires representing each letter of a message; at the recipient's end, the currents electrolysed the acid in the tubes in sequence, releasing streams of hydrogen bubbles next to each associated letter or numeral. The telegraph receiver's operator would watch the bubbles and could then record the transmitted message. This is in contrast to later telegraphs that used a single wire (with ground return).

Hans Christian Ørsted discovered in 1820 that an electric current produces a magnetic field that will deflect a compass needle. In the same year Johann Schweigger invented the galvanometer, with a coil of wire around a compass, that could be used as a sensitive indicator for an electric current. Also that year, André-Marie Ampère suggested that telegraphy could be achieved by placing small magnets under the ends of a set of wires, one pair of wires for each letter of the alphabet. He was apparently unaware of Schweigger's invention at the time, which would have made his system much more sensitive. In 1825, Peter Barlow tried Ampère's idea but only got it to work over 200 feet (61 m) and declared it impractical. In 1830 William Ritchie improved on Ampère's design by placing the magnetic needles inside a coil of wire connected to each pair of conductors. He successfully demonstrated it, showing the feasibility of the electromagnetic telegraph, but only within a lecture hall.

In 1825, William Sturgeon invented the electromagnet, with a single winding of uninsulated wire on a piece of varnished iron, which increased the magnetic force produced by electric current. Joseph Henry improved it in 1828 by placing several windings of insulated wire around the bar, creating a much more powerful electromagnet which could operate a telegraph through the high resistance of long telegraph wires. During his tenure at The Albany Academy from 1826 to 1832, Henry first demonstrated the theory of the 'magnetic telegraph' by ringing a bell through one-mile (1.6 km) of wire strung around the room in 1831.

In 1835, Joseph Henry and Edward Davy independently invented the mercury dipping electrical relay, in which a magnetic needle is dipped into a pot of mercury when an electric current passes through the surrounding coil. In 1837, Davy invented the much more practical metallic make-and-break relay which became the relay of choice in telegraph systems and a key component for periodically renewing weak signals. Davy demonstrated his telegraph system in Regent's Park in 1837 and was granted a patent on 1838. Davy also invented a printing telegraph which used the electric current from the telegraph signal to mark a ribbon of calico infused with potassium iodide and calcium hypochlorite.

=== First working systems ===
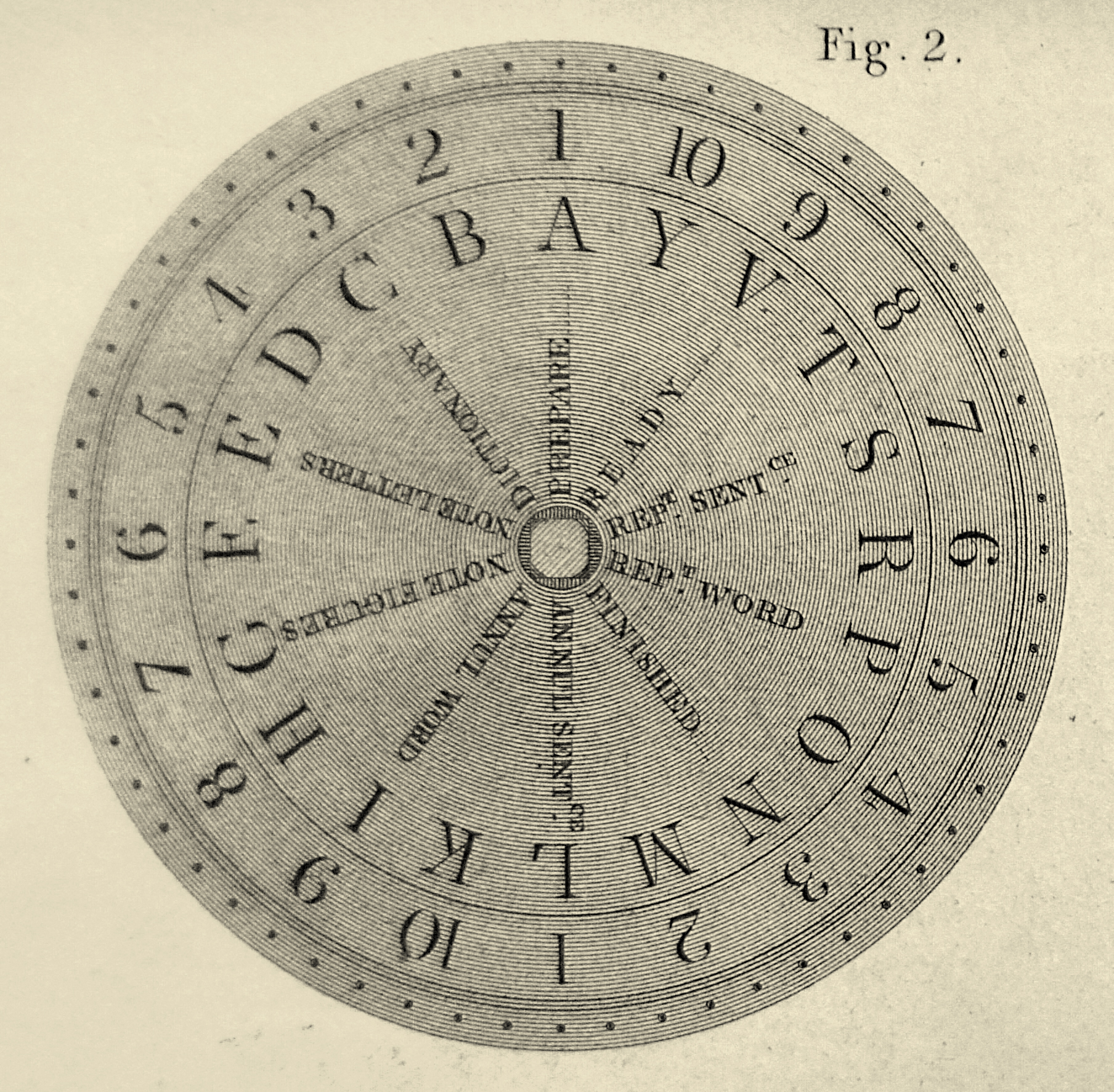
Revolving alphanumeric dial created by Francis Ronalds as part of his electric telegraph (1830)

The first working telegraph was built by the English inventor Francis Ronalds in 1816 and used static electricity. At the family home on Hammersmith Mall, he set up a complete subterranean system in a 175-yard (160 m) long trench as well as an eight-mile (13 km) long overhead telegraph. The lines were connected at both ends to revolving dials marked with the letters of the alphabet and electrical impulses sent along the wire were used to transmit messages. Offering his invention to the Admiralty in July 1816, it was rejected as "wholly unnecessary". His account of the scheme and the possibilities of rapid global communication in Descriptions of an Electrical Telegraph and of some other Electrical Apparatus was the first published work on electric telegraphy and even described the risk of signal retardation due to induction. Elements of Ronalds' design were utilised in the subsequent commercialisation of the telegraph over 20 years later.

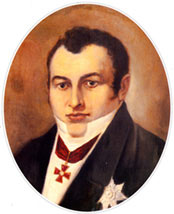
Pavel Schilling, an early pioneer of electrical telegraphy

The Schilling telegraph, invented by Baron Schilling von Canstatt in 1832, was an early needle telegraph. It had a transmitting device that consisted of a keyboard with 16 black-and-white keys. These served for switching the electric current. The receiving instrument consisted of six galvanometers with magnetic needles, suspended from silk threads. The two stations of Schilling's telegraph were connected by eight wires; six were connected with the galvanometers, one served for the return current and one for a signal bell. When at the starting station the operator pressed a key, the corresponding pointer was deflected at the receiving station. Different positions of black and white flags on different disks gave combinations which corresponded to the letters or numbers. Pavel Schilling subsequently improved its apparatus by reducing the number of connecting wires from eight to two.

On 21 October 1832, Schilling managed a short-distance transmission of signals between two telegraphs in different rooms of his apartment. In 1836, the British government attempted to buy the design but Schilling instead accepted overtures from Nicholas I of Russia. Schilling's telegraph was tested on a 5-kilometre-long (3.1 mi) experimental underground and underwater cable, laid around the building of the main Admiralty in Saint Petersburg and was approved for a telegraph between the imperial palace at Peterhof and the naval base at Kronstadt. However, the project was cancelled following Schilling's death in 1837. Schilling was also one of the first to put into practice the idea of the binary system of signal transmission. His work was taken over and developed by Moritz von Jacobi who invented telegraph equipment that was used by Tsar Alexander III to connect the Imperial palace at Tsarskoye Selo and Kronstadt Naval Base.

In 1833, Carl Friedrich Gauss, together with the physics professor Wilhelm Weber in Göttingen, installed a 1,200-metre-long (3,900 ft) wire above the town's roofs. Gauss combined the Poggendorff-Schweigger multiplicator with his magnetometer to build a more sensitive device, the galvanometer. To change the direction of the electric current, he constructed a commutator of his own. As a result, he was able to make the distant needle move in the direction set by the commutator on the other end of the line.

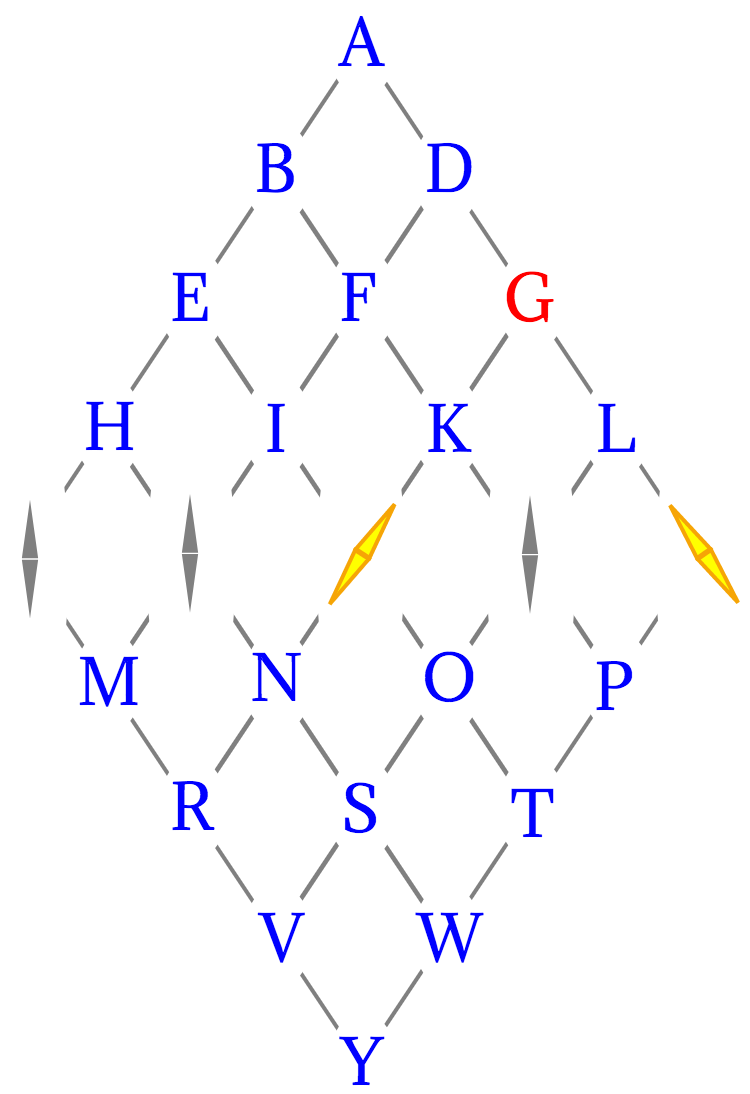
Diagram of alphabet used in a 5-needle Cooke and Wheatstone Telegraph, indicating the letter G

At first, Gauss and Weber used the telegraph to coordinate time, but soon they developed other signals and finally, their own alphabet. The alphabet was encoded in a binary code that was transmitted by positive or negative voltage pulses which were generated by means of moving an induction coil up and down over a permanent magnet and connecting the coil with the transmission wires by means of the commutator. The page of Gauss's laboratory notebook containing both his code and the first message transmitted, as well as a replica of the telegraph made in the 1850s under the instructions of Weber are kept in the faculty of physics at the University of Göttingen, in Germany.

Gauss was convinced that this communication would be of help to his kingdom's towns. Later in the same year, instead of a voltaic pile, Gauss used an induction pulse, enabling him to transmit seven letters a minute instead of two. The inventors and university did not have the funds to develop the telegraph on their own, but they received funding from Alexander von Humboldt. Carl August Steinheil in Munich was able to build a telegraph network within the city in 1835–1836. In 1838, Steinheil installed a telegraph along the Nuremberg–Fürth railway line, built in 1835 as the first German railroad, which was the first earth-return telegraph put into service.

By 1837, William Fothergill Cooke and Charles Wheatstone had co-developed a telegraph system which used a number of needles on a board that could be moved to point to letters of the alphabet. Any number of needles could be used, depending on the number of characters it was required to code. In May 1837 they patented their system. The patent recommended five needles, which coded twenty of the alphabet's 26 letters.

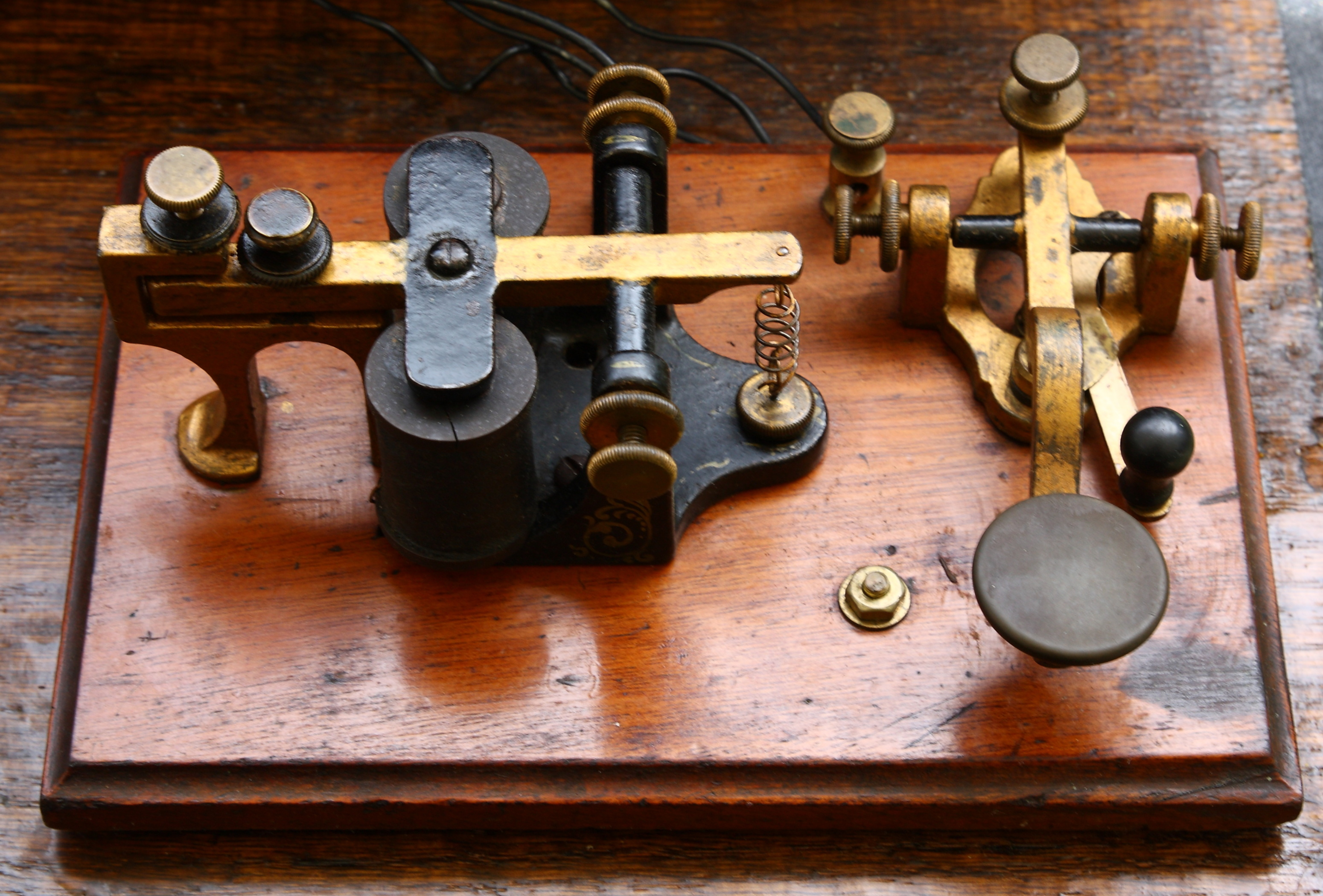
Morse key and sounder

Samuel Morse independently developed and patented a recording electric telegraph in 1837. Morse's assistant Alfred Vail developed an instrument that was called the register for recording the received messages. It embossed dots and dashes on a moving paper tape by a stylus which was operated by an electromagnet. Morse and Vail developed the Morse code signalling alphabet.

On 24 May 1844, Morse sent to Vail the historic first message “WHAT HATH GOD WROUGHT" from the Capitol in Washington to the old Mt. Clare Depot in Baltimore.

== Commercial telegraphy ==
=== Cooke and Wheatstone system ===
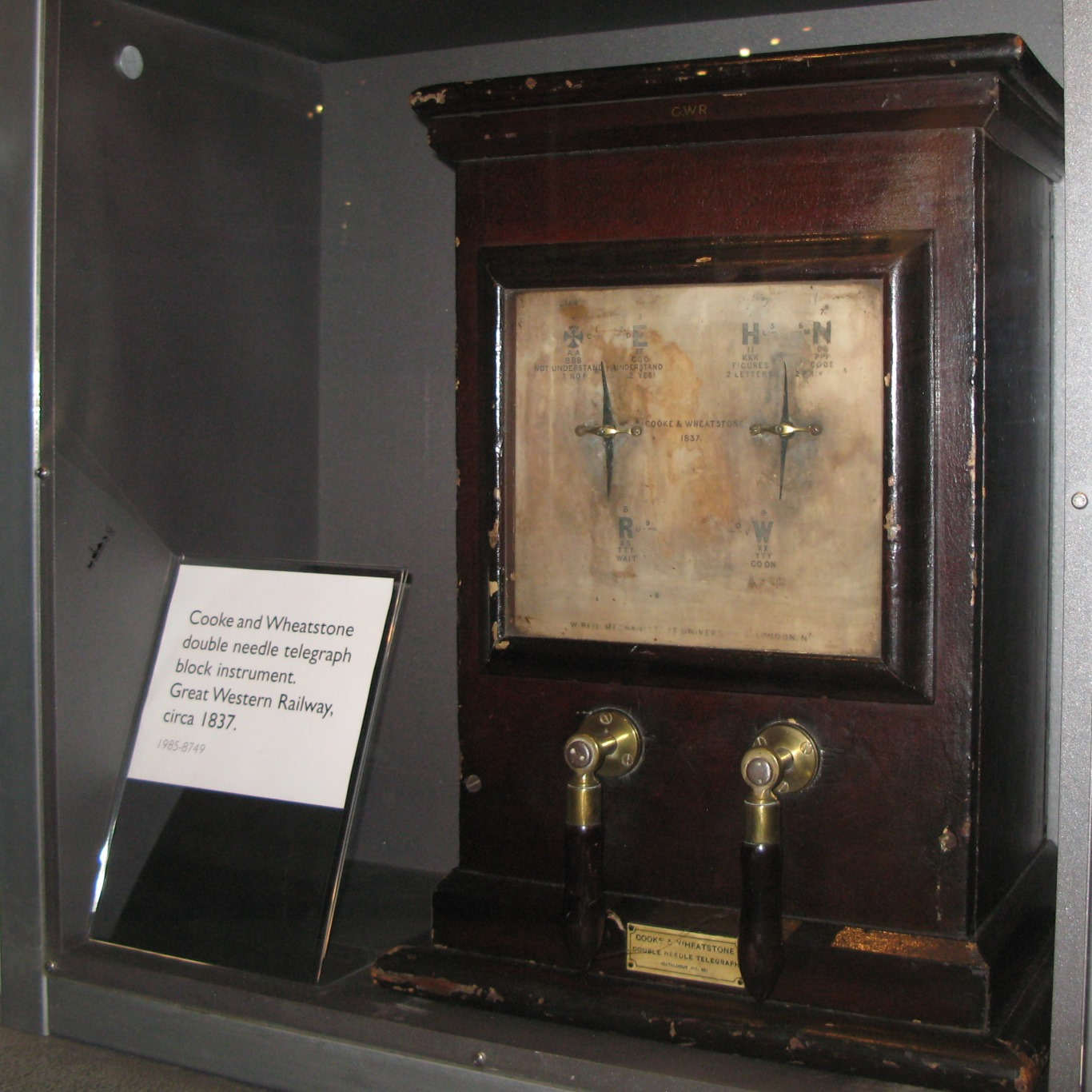
GWR Cooke and Wheatstone double needle telegraph instrument

The first commercial electrical telegraph was the Cooke and Wheatstone system. A demonstration four-needle system was installed on the Euston to Camden Town section of Robert Stephenson's London and Birmingham Railway in 1837 for signalling rope-hauling of locomotives. It was rejected in favour of pneumatic whistles. Cooke and Wheatstone had their first commercial success with a system installed on the Great Western Railway over the 13 miles (21 km) from Paddington station to West Drayton in 1838. This was a five-needle, six-wire system, and had the major advantage of displaying the letter being sent so operators did not need to learn a code. The insulation failed on the underground cables between Paddington and West Drayton, and when the line was extended to Slough in 1843, the system was converted to a one-needle, two-wire configuration with uninsulated wires on poles. The cost of installing wires was ultimately more economically significant than the cost of training operators. The one-needle telegraph proved highly successful on British railways, and 15,000 sets were in use at the end of the nineteenth century; some remained in service in the 1930s. The Electric Telegraph Company, the world's first public telegraphy company, was formed in 1845 by financier John Lewis Ricardo and Cooke.

=== Wheatstone ABC telegraph ===
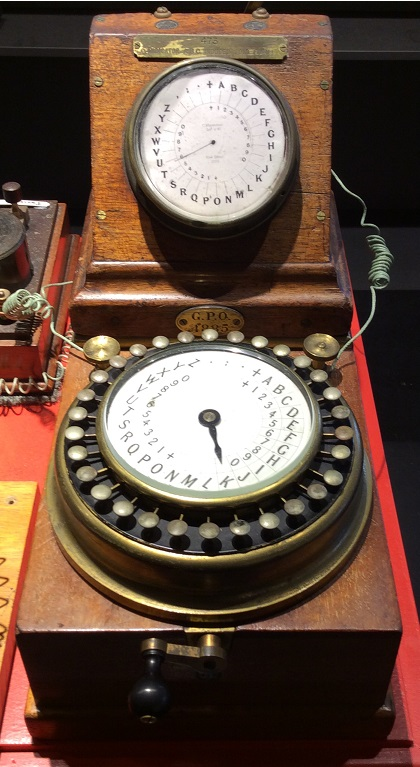
A magneto-powered Wheatstone A. B. C. telegraph with the horizontal "communicator" dial, the inclined "indicator" dial and crank handle for the magneto that generated the electrical signal.

Wheatstone developed a practical alphabetical system in 1840 called the A.B.C. System, used mostly on private wires. This consisted of a "communicator" at the sending end and an "indicator" at the receiving end. The communicator consisted of a circular dial with a pointer and the 26 letters of the alphabet (and four punctuation marks) around its circumference. Against each letter was a key that could be pressed. A transmission would begin with the pointers on the dials at both ends set to the start position. The transmitting operator would then press down the key corresponding to the letter to be transmitted. In the base of the communicator was a magneto actuated by a handle on the front. This would be turned to apply an alternating voltage to the line. Each half cycle of the current would advance the pointers at both ends by one position. When the pointer reached the position of the depressed key, it would stop and the magneto would be disconnected from the line. The communicator's pointer was geared to the magneto mechanism. The indicator's pointer was moved by a polarised electromagnet whose armature was coupled to it through an escapement. Thus the alternating line voltage moved the indicator's pointer on to the position of the depressed key on the communicator. Pressing another key would then release the pointer and the previous key, and re-connect the magneto to the line. These machines were very robust and simple to operate, and they stayed in use in Britain until well into the 20th century.

=== Morse system ===
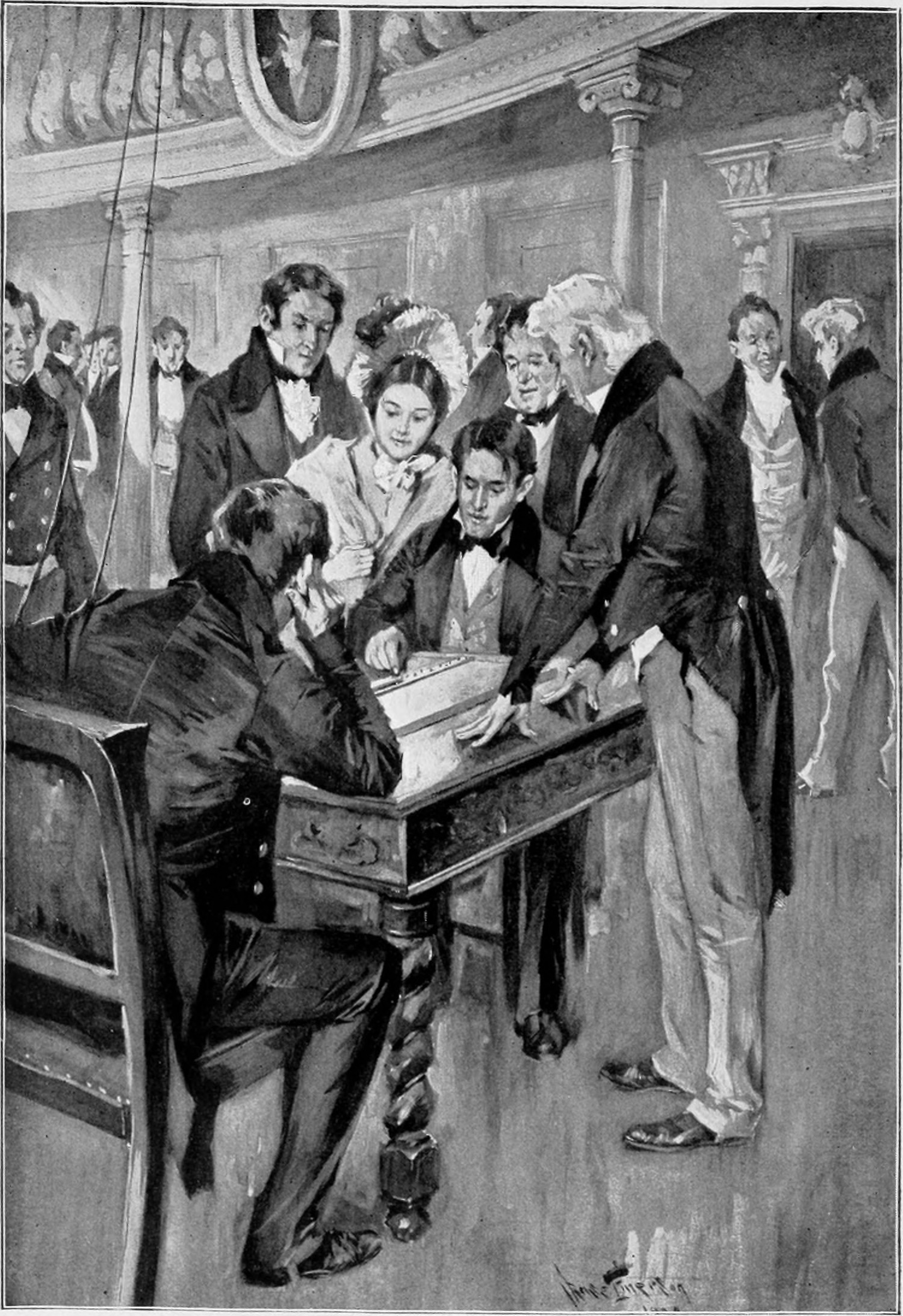
1900 illustration of Professor Morse sending the first long-distance message – "WHAT HATH GOD WROUGHT" – on 24 May 1844

The Morse system uses a single wire between offices. At the sending station, an operator taps on a switch called a telegraph key, spelling out text messages in Morse code. Originally, the armature was intended to make marks on paper tape, but operators learned to interpret the clicks and it was more efficient to write down the message directly.

In 1851, a conference in Vienna of countries in the German-Austrian Telegraph Union (which included many central European countries) adopted the Morse telegraph as the system for international communications. The international Morse code adopted was considerably modified from the original American Morse code, and was based on a code used on Hamburg railways (Gerke, 1848). A common code was a necessary step to allow direct telegraph connection between countries. With different codes, additional operators were required to translate and retransmit the message. In 1865, a conference in Paris adopted Gerke's code as the International Morse code and was henceforth the international standard. The US, however, continued to use American Morse code internally for some time, hence international messages required retransmission in both directions.

In the United States, the Morse/Vail telegraph was quickly deployed in the two decades following the first demonstration in 1844. The overland telegraph connected the west coast of the continent to the east coast by 24 October 1861, bringing an end to the Pony Express.

=== Foy–Breguet system ===
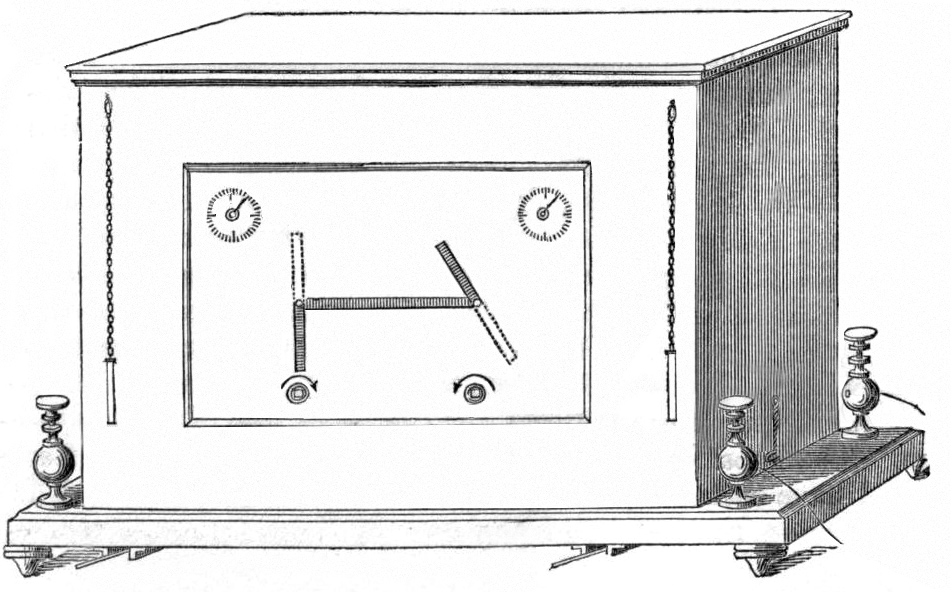
Foy–Breguet telegraph displaying the letter "Q"

France was slow to adopt the electrical telegraph, because of the extensive optical telegraph system built during the Napoleonic era. There was also serious concern that an electrical telegraph could be quickly put out of action by enemy saboteurs, something that was much more difficult to do with optical telegraphs which had no exposed hardware between stations. The Foy-Breguet telegraph was eventually adopted. This was a two-needle system using two signal wires but displayed in a different way than other needle telegraphs. The needles made symbols similar to the Chappe optical system symbols, making it more familiar to the telegraph operators. The optical system was decommissioned starting in 1846, but not completely until 1855. In that year the Foy-Breguet system was replaced with the Morse system.

=== Expansion ===
As well as the rapid expansion of the use of the telegraphs along the railways, they soon spread into the field of mass communication with the instruments being installed in post offices. The era of mass personal communication had begun. Telegraph networks were expensive to build, but financing was readily available, especially from London bankers. By 1852, National systems were in operation in major countries:

Extent of the telegraph in 1852
| Country | Company or system | Miles or kilometers of wire | ref |
|---|---|---|---|
| United States | 20 companies | 23,000 mi or 37,000 km | |
| United Kingdom | Electric Telegraph Company, Magnetic Telegraph Company, and others | 2,200 mi or 3,500 km | |
| Prussia | Siemens system | 1,400 mi or 2,300 km | |
| Austria | Siemens system | 1,000 mi or 1,600 km | |
| Canada | | 900 mi or 1,400 km | |
| France | optical systems dominant | 700 mi or 1,100 km | |

The New York and Mississippi Valley Printing Telegraph Company, for example, was created in 1852 in Rochester, New York and eventually became the Western Union Telegraph Company. Although many countries had telegraph networks, there was no worldwide interconnection. Message by post was still the primary means of communication to countries outside Europe.

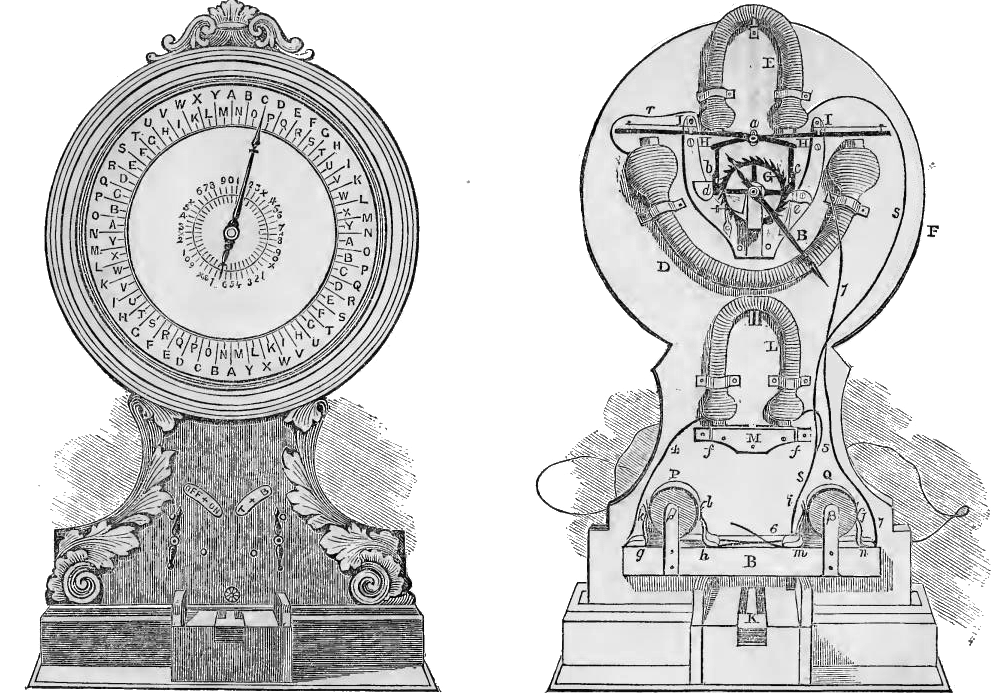
Sketch from The Decorator's Assistant magazine, 22 May 1847

Worldwide postal speeds in 1852
A letter by post from London took
| days | to reach |
|---|---|
| 12 | New York in the United States |
| 13 | Alexandria in Egypt |
| 19 | Constantinople in Ottoman Turkey |
| 33 | Bombay in India (west coast of India) |
| 44 | Calcutta in Bengal (east coast of India) |
| 45 | Singapore |
| 57 | Shanghai in China |
| 73 | Sydney in Australia |

Telegraphy was introduced in Central Asia during the 1870s.

=== Telegraphic improvements ===
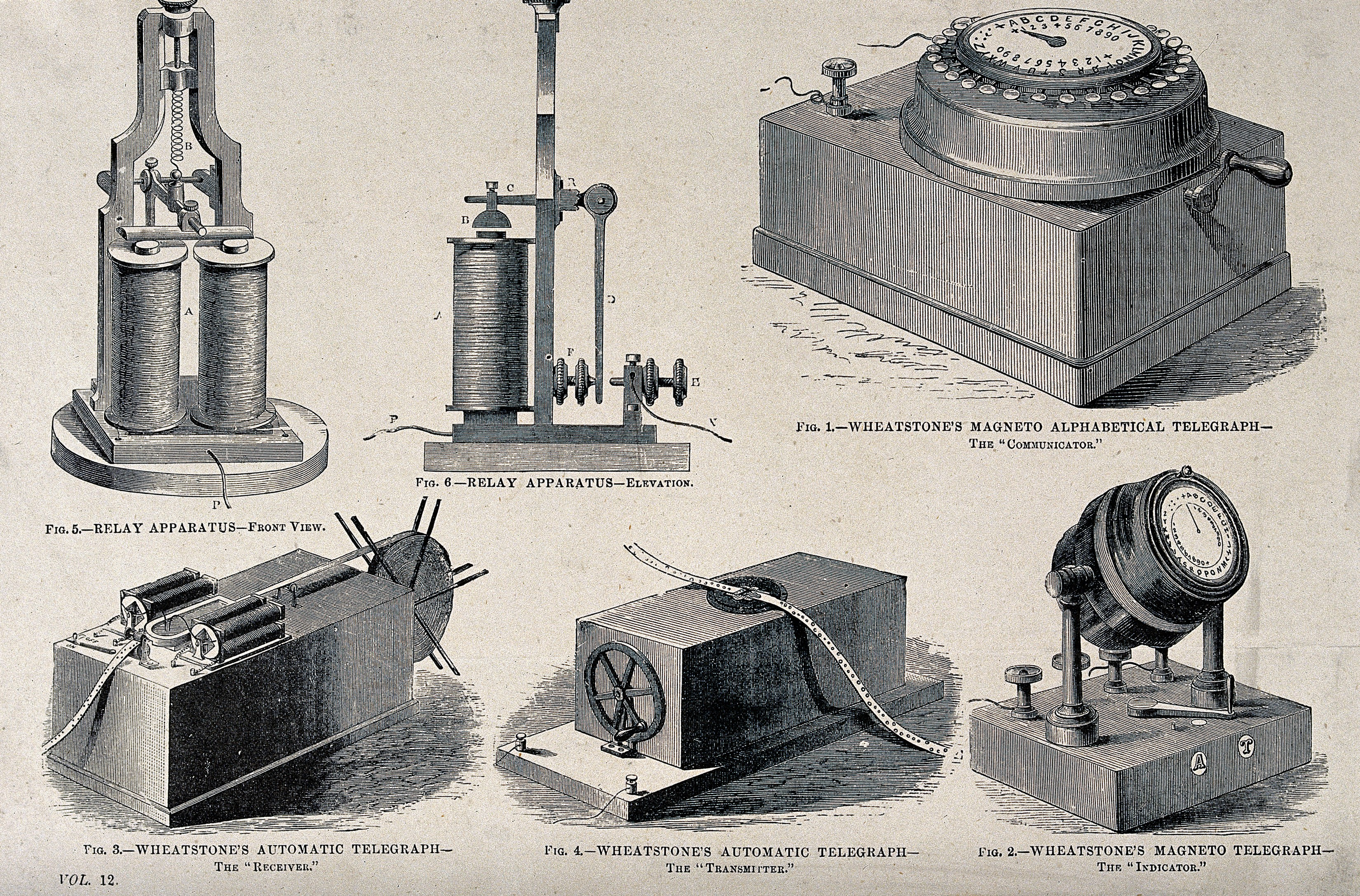
Wheatstone automated telegraph network equipment

A continuing goal in telegraphy was to reduce the cost per message by reducing hand-work, or increasing the sending rate. There were many experiments with moving pointers, and various electrical encodings. However, most systems were too complicated and unreliable. A successful expedient to reduce the cost per message was the development of telegraphese.

The first system that did not require skilled technicians to operate was Charles Wheatstone's ABC system in 1840 in which the letters of the alphabet were arranged around a clock-face, and the signal caused a needle to indicate the letter. This early system required the receiver to be present in real time to record the message and it reached speeds of up to 15 words a minute.

In 1846, Alexander Bain patented a chemical telegraph in Edinburgh. The signal current moved an iron pen across a moving paper tape soaked in a mixture of ammonium nitrate and potassium ferrocyanide, decomposing the chemical and producing readable blue marks in Morse code. The speed of the printing telegraph was 16 and a half words per minute, but messages still required translation into English by live copyists. Chemical telegraphy came to an end in the US in 1851, when the Morse group defeated the Bain patent in the US District Court.

For a brief period, starting with the New York–Boston line in 1848, some telegraph networks began to employ sound operators, who were trained to understand Morse code aurally. Gradually, the use of sound operators eliminated the need for telegraph receivers to include register and tape. Instead, the receiving instrument was developed into a "sounder", an electromagnet that was energized by a current and attracted a small iron lever. When the sounding key was opened or closed, the sounder lever struck an anvil. The Morse operator distinguished a dot and a dash by the short or long interval between the two clicks. The message was then written out in long-hand.

Royal Earl House developed and patented a letter-printing telegraph system in 1846 which employed an alphabetic keyboard for the transmitter and automatically printed the letters on paper at the receiver, and followed this up with a steam-powered version in 1852. Advocates of printing telegraphy said it would eliminate Morse operators' errors. The House machine was used on four main American telegraph lines by 1852. The speed of the House machine was announced as 2600 words an hour.

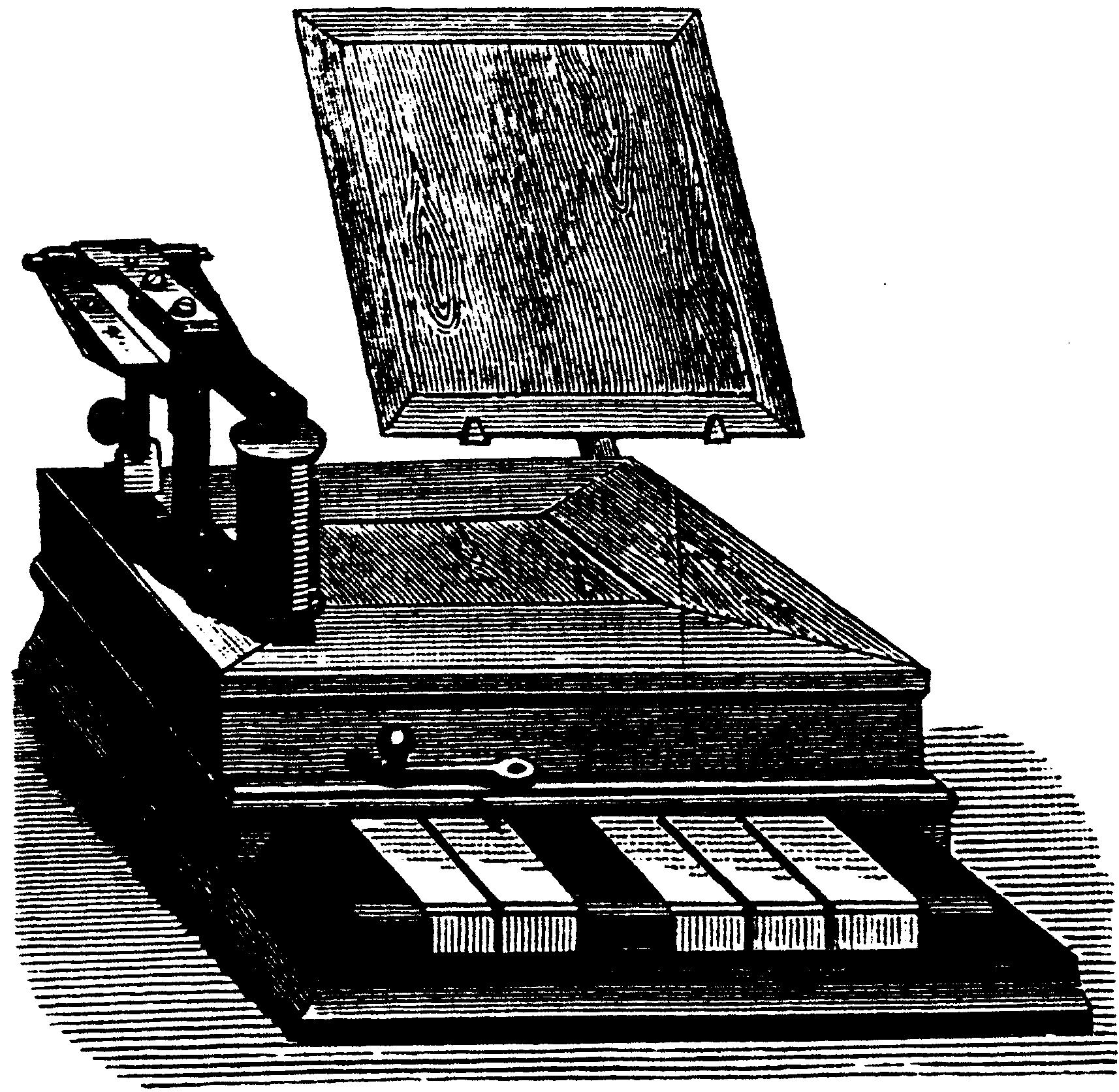
A Baudot keyboard, 1884

David Edward Hughes invented the printing telegraph in 1855; it used a keyboard of 26 keys for the alphabet and a spinning type wheel that determined the letter being transmitted by the length of time that had elapsed since the previous transmission. The system allowed for automatic recording on the receiving end. The system was very stable and accurate and became accepted around the world.

The next improvement was the Baudot code of 1874. French engineer Émile Baudot patented a printing telegraph in which the signals were translated automatically into typographic characters. Each character was assigned a five-bit code, mechanically interpreted from the state of five on/off switches. Operators had to maintain a steady rhythm, and the usual speed of operation was 30 words per minute.

By this point, reception had been automated, but the speed and accuracy of the transmission were still limited to the skill of the human operator. The first practical automated system was patented by Charles Wheatstone. The message (in Morse code) was typed onto a piece of perforated tape using a keyboard-like device called the 'Stick Punch'. The transmitter automatically ran the tape through and transmitted the message at the then exceptionally high speed of 70 words per minute.

==== Teleprinters ====
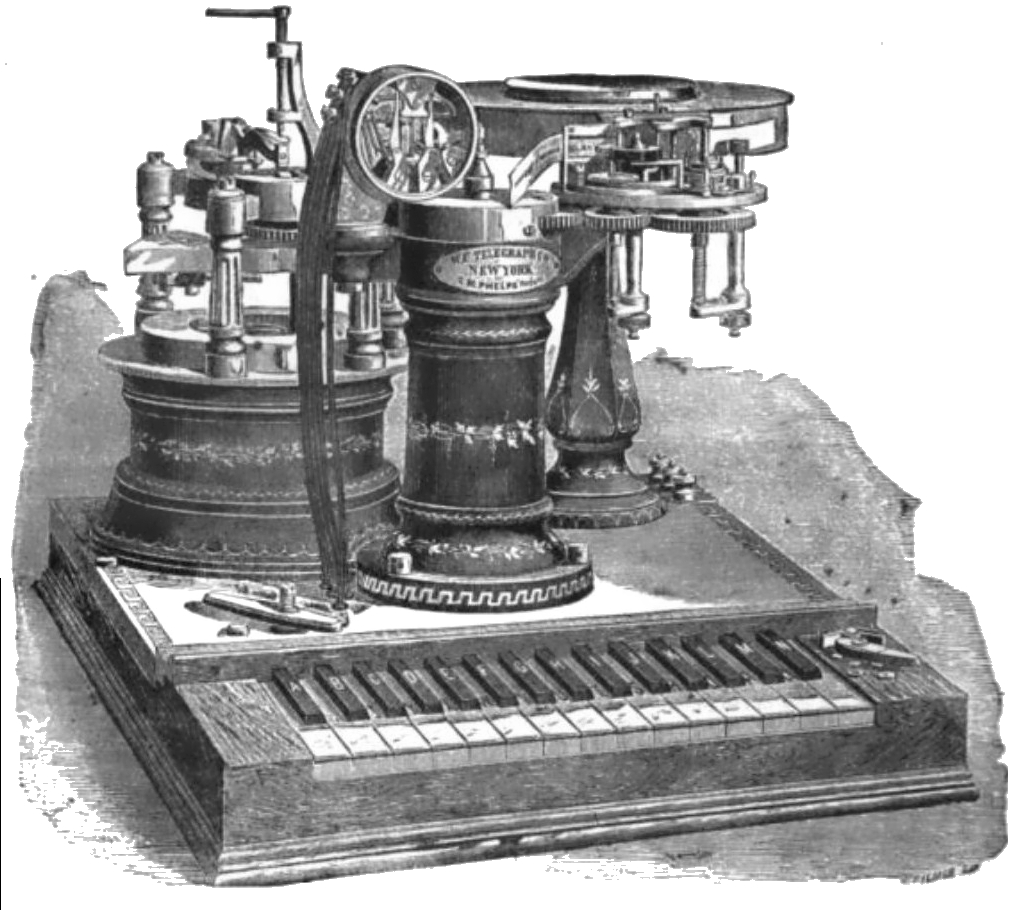
Phelps' Electro-motor Printing Telegraph from c. 1880, the last and most advanced telegraphy mechanism designed by George May Phelps

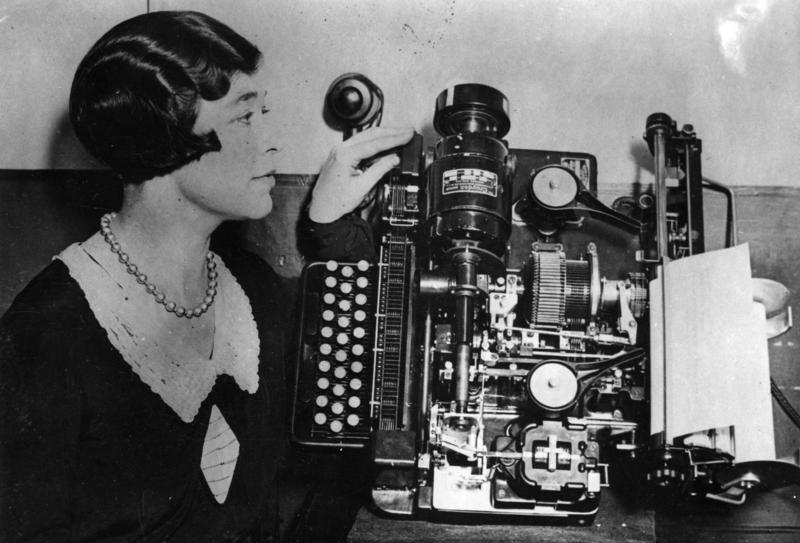
A Creed Model 7 teleprinter in 1930

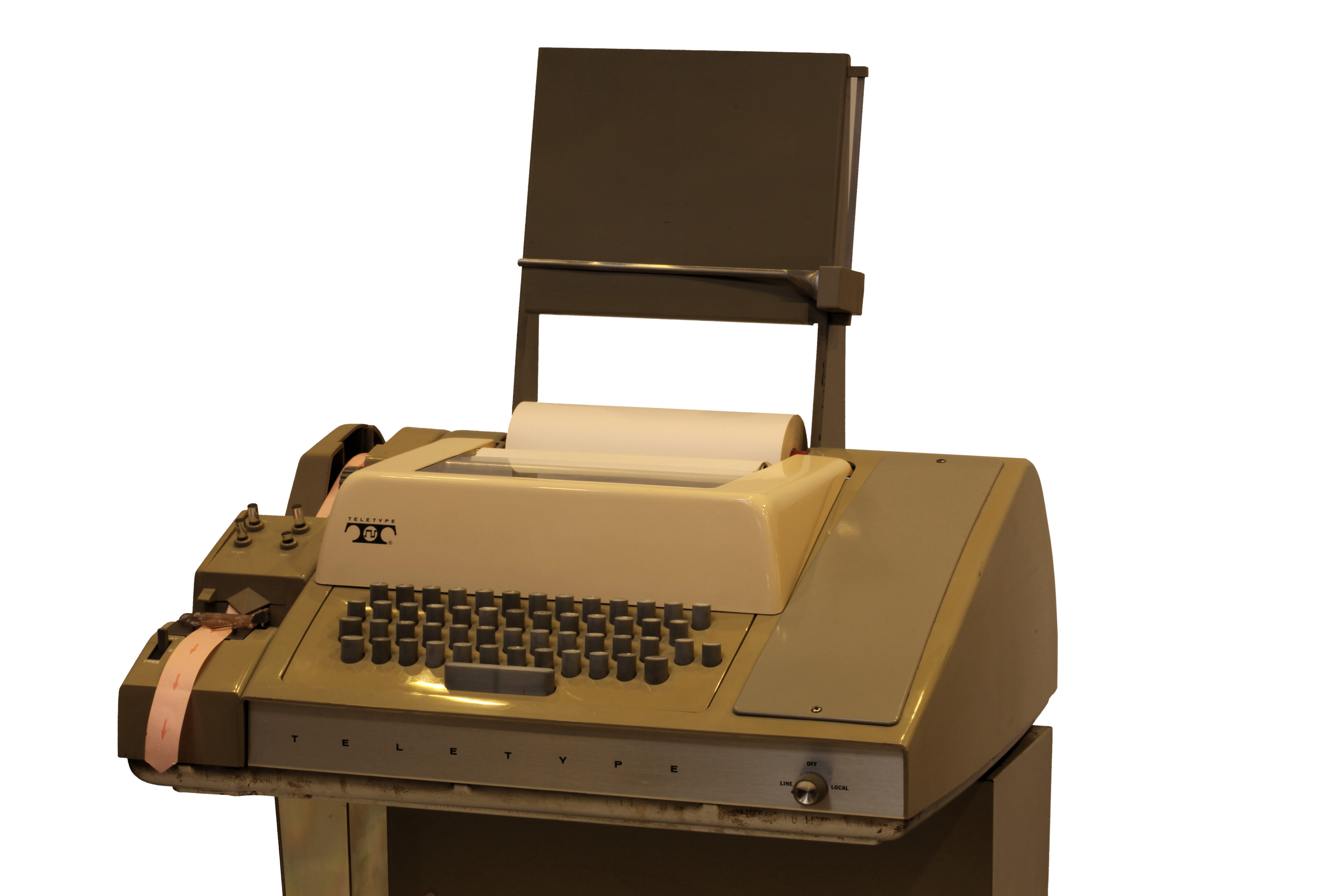
Teletype Model 33 ASR (Automatic Send and Receive)

An early successful teleprinter was invented by Frederick G. Creed. In Glasgow he created his first keyboard perforator, which used compressed air to punch the holes. He also created a reperforator (receiving perforator) and a printer. The reperforator punched incoming Morse signals onto paper tape and the printer decoded this tape to produce alphanumeric characters on plain paper. This was the origin of the Creed High Speed Automatic Printing System, which could run at an unprecedented 200 words per minute. His system was adopted by the Daily Mail for daily transmission of the newspaper contents.

With the invention of the teletypewriter, telegraphic encoding became fully automated. Early teletypewriters used the ITA-1 Baudot code, a five-bit code. This yielded only thirty-two codes, so it was over-defined into two "shifts", "letters" and "figures". An explicit, unshared shift code prefaced each set of letters and figures. In 1901, Baudot's code was modified by Donald Murray.

In the 1930s, teleprinters were produced by Teletype in the US, Creed in Britain and Siemens in Germany.

By 1935, message routing was the last great barrier to full automation. Large telegraphy providers began to develop systems that used telephone-like rotary dialling to connect teletypewriters. These resulting systems were called "Telex" (TELegraph EXchange). Telex machines first performed rotary-telephone-style pulse dialling for circuit switching, and then sent data by ITA2. This "type A" Telex routing functionally automated message routing.

The first wide-coverage Telex network was implemented in Germany during the 1930s as a network used to communicate within the government.

At the rate of 45.45 (±0.5%) baud – considered speedy at the time – up to 25 telex channels could share a single long-distance telephone channel by using voice frequency telegraphy multiplexing, making telex the least expensive method of reliable long-distance communication.

Automatic teleprinter exchange service was introduced into Canada by CPR Telegraphs and CN Telegraph in July 1957 and in 1958, Western Union started to build a Telex network in the United States.

==== The harmonic telegraph ====
The most expensive aspect of a telegraph system was the installation – the laying of the wire, which was often very long. The costs would be better covered by finding a way to send more than one message at a time through the single wire, thus increasing revenue per wire. Early devices included the duplex and the quadruplex which allowed, respectively, one or two telegraph transmissions in each direction. However, an even greater number of channels was desired on the busiest lines. In the latter half of the 1800s, several inventors worked towards creating a method for doing just that, including Charles Bourseul, Thomas Edison, Elisha Gray, and Alexander Graham Bell.

One approach was to have resonators of several different frequencies act as carriers of a modulated on-off signal. This was the harmonic telegraph, a form of frequency-division multiplexing. These various frequencies, referred to as harmonics, could then be combined into one complex signal and sent down the single wire. On the receiving end, the frequencies would be separated with a matching set of resonators.

With a set of frequencies being carried down a single wire, it was realized that the human voice itself could be transmitted electrically through the wire. This effort led to the invention of the telephone. (While the work toward packing multiple telegraph signals onto one wire led to telephony, later advances would pack multiple voice signals onto one wire by increasing the bandwidth by modulating frequencies much higher than human hearing. Eventually, the bandwidth was widened much further by using laser light signals sent through fiber optic cables. Fiber optic transmission can carry 25,000 telephone signals simultaneously down a single fiber.)

=== Oceanic telegraph cables ===
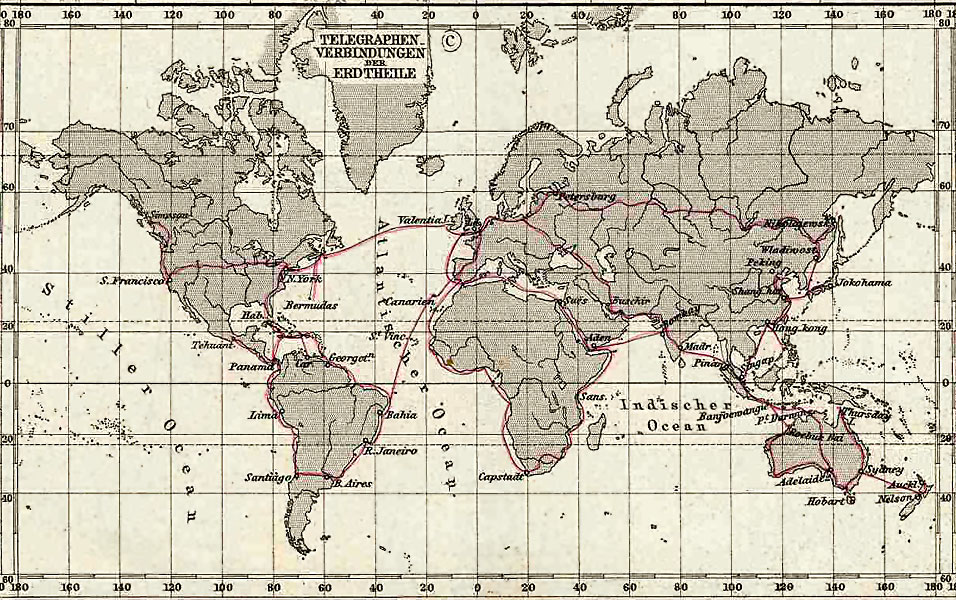
Major telegraph lines in 1891

Soon after the first successful telegraph systems were operational, the possibility of transmitting messages across the sea by way of submarine communications cables was first proposed. One of the primary technical challenges was to sufficiently insulate the submarine cable to prevent the electric current from leaking out into the water. In 1842, a Scottish surgeon William Montgomerie introduced gutta-percha, the adhesive juice of the Palaquium gutta tree, to Europe. Michael Faraday and Wheatstone soon discovered the merits of gutta-percha as an insulator, and in 1845, the latter suggested that it should be employed to cover the wire which was proposed to be laid from Dover to Calais. Gutta-percha was used as insulation on a wire laid across the Rhine between Deutz and Cologne. In 1849, C. V. Walker, electrician to the South Eastern Railway, submerged a 2 miles (3.2 km) wire coated with gutta-percha off the coast from Folkestone, which was tested successfully.

John Watkins Brett, an engineer from Bristol, sought and obtained permission from Louis-Philippe in 1847 to establish telegraphic communication between France and England. The first undersea cable was laid in 1850, connecting the two countries and was followed by connections to Ireland and the Low Countries.

The Atlantic Telegraph Company was formed in London in 1856 to undertake to construct a commercial telegraph cable across the Atlantic Ocean. It was successfully completed on 18 July 1866 by the ship SS Great Eastern, captained by Sir James Anderson, after many mishaps along the way. John Pender, one of the men on the Great Eastern, later founded several telecommunications companies primarily laying cables between Britain and Southeast Asia. Earlier transatlantic submarine cables installations were attempted in 1857, 1858 and 1865. The 1857 cable only operated intermittently for a few days or weeks before it failed. The study of underwater telegraph cables accelerated interest in mathematical analysis of very long transmission lines. The telegraph lines from Britain to India were connected in 1870. (Those several companies combined to form the Eastern Telegraph Company in 1872.) The HMS Challenger expedition in 1873–1876 mapped the ocean floor for future underwater telegraph cables.

Australia was first linked to the rest of the world in October 1872 by a submarine telegraph cable at Darwin. This brought news reports from the rest of the world. The telegraph across the Pacific was completed in 1902, finally encircling the world.

From the 1850s until well into the 20th century, British submarine cable systems dominated the world system. This was set out as a formal strategic goal, which became known as the All Red Line. In 1896, there were thirty cable laying ships in the world and twenty-four of them were owned by British companies. In 1892, British companies owned and operated two-thirds of the world's cables and by 1923, their share was still 42.7 percent.

=== Cable and Wireless Company ===
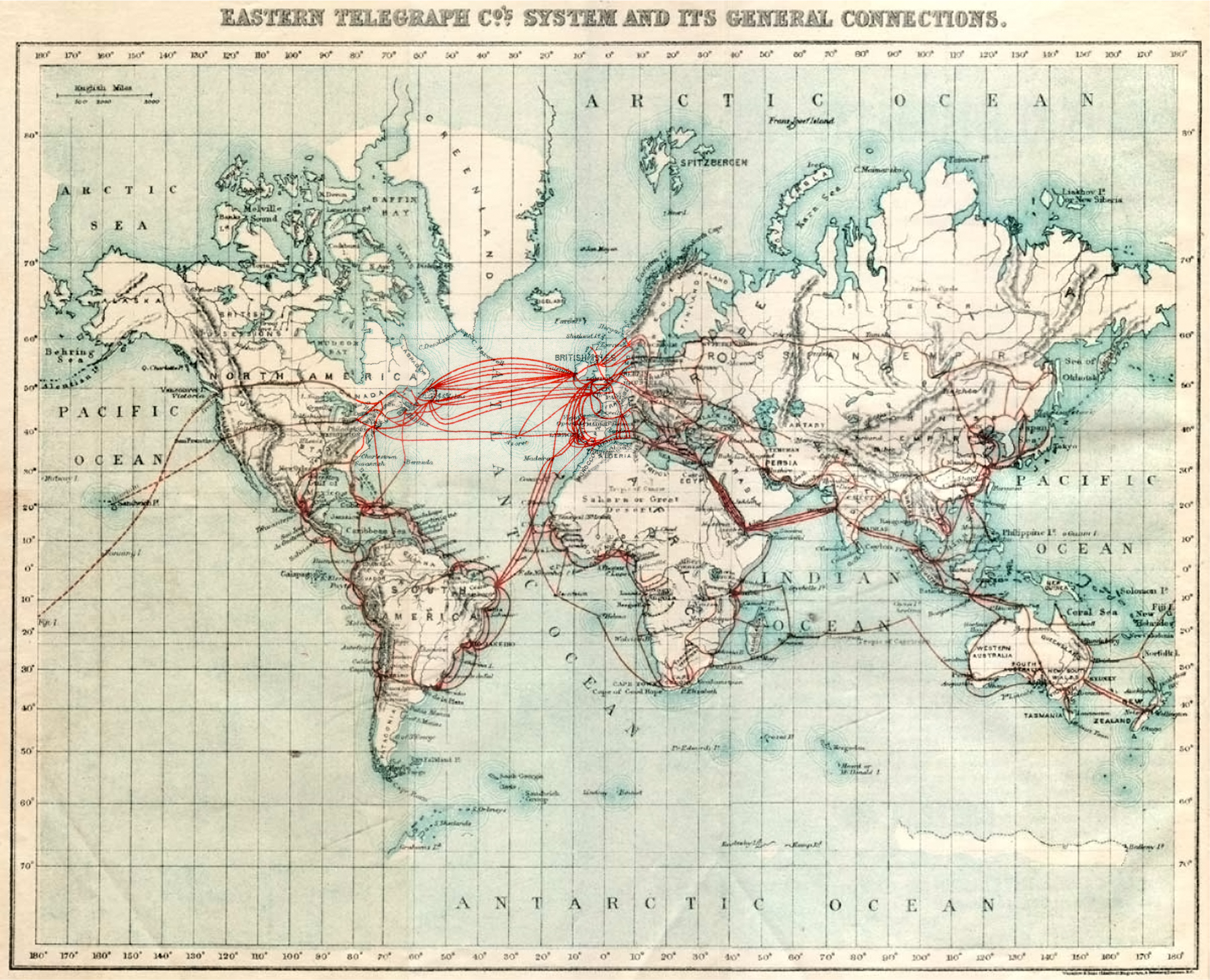
The Eastern Telegraph Company network in 1901

Cable & Wireless was a British telecommunications company that traced its origins back to the 1860s, with Sir John Pender as the founder, although the name was only adopted in 1934. It was formed from successive mergers including:

- The Falmouth, Malta, Gibraltar Telegraph Company
- The British Indian Submarine Telegraph Company
- The Marseilles, Algiers and Malta Telegraph Company
- The Eastern Telegraph Company
- The Eastern Extension Australasia and China Telegraph Company
- The Eastern and Associated Telegraph Companies

== Telegraphy and longitude ==
Main article § Section: History of longitude § Land surveying and telegraphy.

The telegraph was very important for sending time signals to determine longitude, providing greater accuracy than previously available. Longitude was measured by comparing local time (for example local noon occurs when the sun is at its highest above the horizon) with absolute time (a time that is the same for an observer anywhere on earth). If the local times of two places differ by one hour, the difference in longitude between them is 15° (360°/24h). Before telegraphy, absolute time could be obtained from astronomical events, such as eclipses, occultations or lunar distances, or by transporting an accurate clock (a chronometer) from one location to the other.

The idea of using the telegraph to transmit a time signal for longitude determination was suggested by François Arago to Samuel Morse in 1837, and the first test of this idea was made by Capt. Wilkes of the U.S. Navy in 1844, over Morse's line between Washington and Baltimore. The method was soon in practical use for longitude determination, in particular by the U.S. Coast Survey, and over longer and longer distances as the telegraph network spread across North America and the world, and as technical developments improved accuracy and productivity

The "telegraphic longitude net" soon became worldwide. Transatlantic links between Europe and North America were established in 1866 and 1870. The US Navy extended observations into the West Indies and Central and South America with an additional transatlantic link from South America to Lisbon between 1874 and 1890. British, Russian and US observations created a chain from Europe through Suez, Aden, Madras, Singapore, China and Japan, to Vladivostok, thence to Saint Petersburg and back to Western Europe.

Australia's telegraph network was linked to Singapore's via Java in 1871, and the net circled the globe in 1902 with the connection of the Australia and New Zealand networks to Canada's via the All Red Line. The two determinations of longitudes, one transmitted from east to west and the other from west to east, agreed within one second of arc (1/15 second of time – less than 30 metres).

== Telegraphy in war ==
The ability to send telegrams brought obvious advantages to those conducting war. Secret messages were encoded, so interception alone would not be sufficient for the opposing side to gain an advantage. There were also geographical constraints on intercepting the telegraph cables that improved security, however once radio telegraphy was developed interception became far more widespread.

=== Crimean War ===
The Crimean War was one of the first conflicts to use telegraphs and was one of the first to be documented extensively. In 1854, the government in London created a military Telegraph Detachment for the Army commanded by an officer of the Royal Engineers. It was to comprise twenty-five men from the Royal Corps of Sappers & Miners trained by the Electric Telegraph Company to construct and work the first field electric telegraph.

Journalistic recording of the war was provided by William Howard Russell (writing for The Times newspaper) with photographs by Roger Fenton. News from war correspondents kept the public of the nations involved in the war informed of the day-to-day events in a way that had not been possible in any previous war. After the French extended their telegraph lines to the coast of the Black Sea in late 1854, war news began reaching London in two days. When the British laid an underwater cable to the Crimean peninsula in April 1855, news reached London in a few hours. These prompt daily news reports energised British public opinion on the war, which brought down the government and led to Lord Palmerston becoming prime minister.

=== American Civil War ===
During the American Civil War the telegraph proved its value as a tactical, operational, and strategic communication medium and an important contributor to Union victory. By contrast the Confederacy failed to make effective use of the South's much smaller telegraph network. Prior to the War the telegraph systems were primarily used in the commercial sector. Government buildings were not inter-connected with telegraph lines, but relied on runners to carry messages back and forth. Before the war the Government saw no need to connect lines within city limits, however, they did see the use in connections between cities. Washington D.C. being the hub of government, it had the most connections, but there were only a few lines running north and south out of the city. It was not until the Civil War that the government saw the true potential of the telegraph system. Soon after the shelling of Fort Sumter, the South cut telegraph lines running into D.C., which put the city in a state of panic because they feared an immediate Southern invasion.

Within 6 months of the start of the war, the U.S. Military Telegraph Corps (USMT) had laid approximately 300 miles (480 km) of line. By war's end they had laid approximately 15,000 miles (24,000 km) of line, 8,000 for military and 5,000 for commercial use, and had handled approximately 6.5 million messages. The telegraph was not only important for communication within the armed forces, but also in the civilian sector, helping political leaders to maintain control over their districts.

Even before the war, the American Telegraph Company censored suspect messages informally to block aid to the secession movement. During the war, Secretary of War Simon Cameron, and later Edwin Stanton, wanted control over the telegraph lines to maintain the flow of information. Early in the war, one of Stanton's first acts as Secretary of War was to move telegraph lines from ending at McClellan's headquarters to terminating at the War Department. Stanton himself said "[telegraphy] is my right arm". Telegraphy assisted Northern victories, including the Battle of Antietam (1862), the Battle of Chickamauga (1863), and Sherman's March to the Sea (1864).

The telegraph system still had its flaws. The USMT, while the main source of telegraphers and cable, was still a civilian agency. Most operators were first hired by the telegraph companies and then contracted out to the War Department. This created tension between generals and their operators. One source of irritation was that USMT operators did not have to follow military authority. Usually they performed without hesitation, but they were not required to, so Albert Myer created a U.S. Army Signal Corps in February 1863. As the new head of the Signal Corps, Myer tried to get all telegraph and flag signaling under his command, and therefore subject to military discipline. After creating the Signal Corps, Myer pushed to further develop new telegraph systems. While the USMT relied primarily on civilian lines and operators, the Signal Corp's new field telegraph could be deployed and dismantled faster than USMT's system.

=== First World War ===
During World War I, Britain's telegraph communications were almost completely uninterrupted, while it was able to quickly cut Germany's cables worldwide. The British government censored telegraph cable companies in an effort to root out espionage and restrict financial transactions with Central Powers nations. British access to transatlantic cables and its codebreaking expertise led to the Zimmermann Telegram incident that contributed to the US joining the war. Despite British acquisition of German colonies and expansion into the Middle East, debt from the war led to Britain's control over telegraph cables to weaken while US control grew.

=== Second World War ===
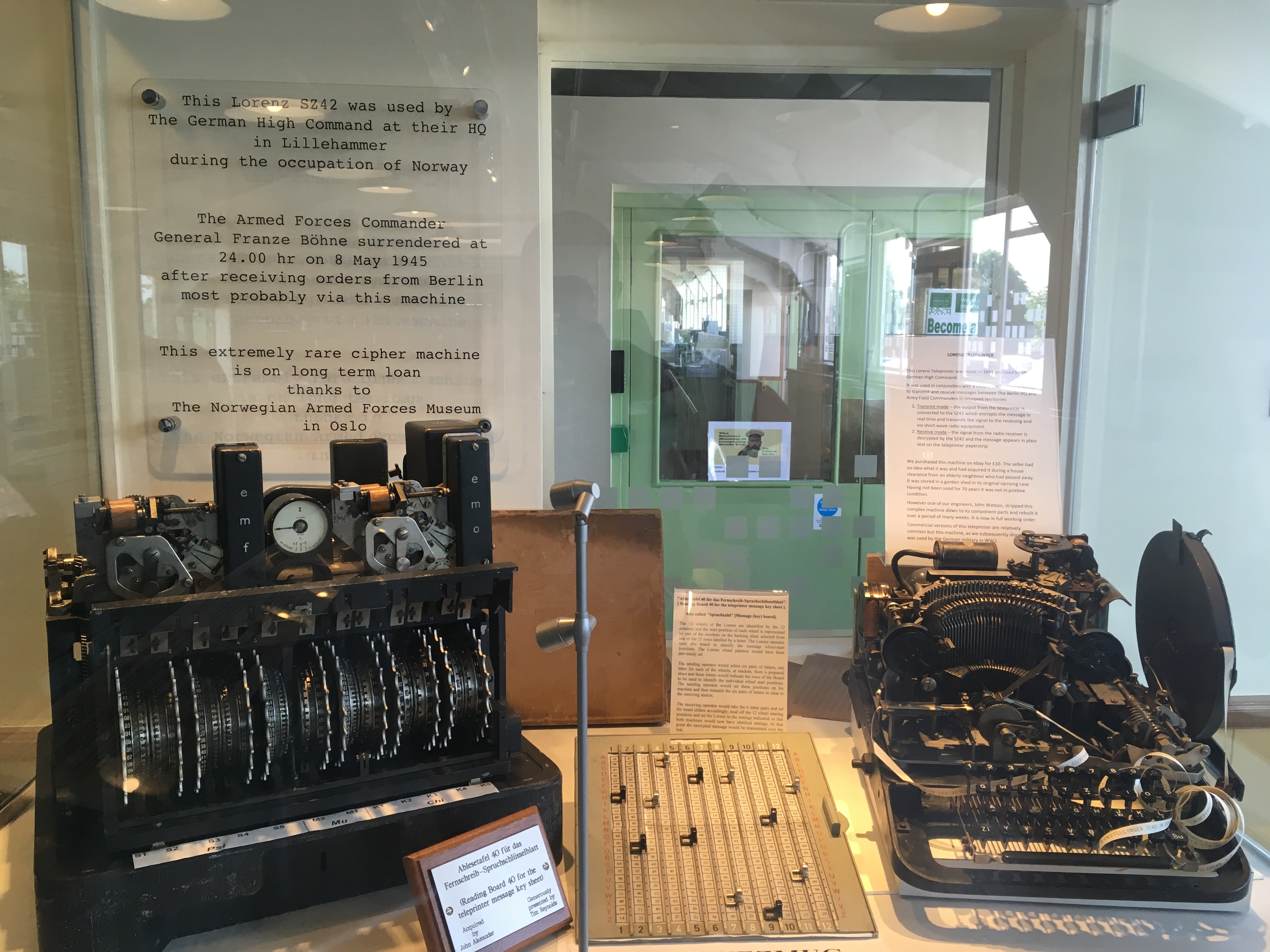
German Lorenz SZ42 teleprinter attachment (left) and Lorenz military teleprinter (right) at The National Museum of Computing on Bletchley Park, England

World War II revived the "cables war" of 1914–1918. In 1939, German-owned cables across the Atlantic were cut once again, and, in 1940, Italian cables to South America and Spain were cut in retaliation for Italian action against two of the five British cables linking Gibraltar and Malta. Electra House, Cable & Wireless's head office and central cable station, was damaged by German bombing in 1941.

Resistance movements in occupied Europe sabotaged communications facilities such as telegraph lines, forcing the Germans to use wireless telegraphy, which could then be intercepted by Britain. The Germans developed a highly complex teleprinter attachment (German: Schlüssel-Zusatz, "cipher attachment") that was used for enciphering telegrams, using the Lorenz cipher, between German High Command (OKW) and the army groups in the field. These contained situation reports, battle plans, and discussions of strategy and tactics. Britain intercepted these signals, diagnosed how the encrypting machine worked, and decrypted a large amount of teleprinter traffic.

== End of the telegraph era ==
In America, the end of the telegraph era can be associated with the fall of the Western Union Telegraph Company. Western Union was the leading telegraph provider for America and was seen as the best competition for the National Bell Telephone Company. Western Union and Bell were both invested in telegraphy and telephone technology. Western Union's decision to allow Bell to gain the advantage in telephone technology was the result of Western Union's upper management's failure to foresee the surpassing of the telephone over the, at the time, dominant telegraph system. Western Union soon lost the legal battle for the rights to their telephone copyrights. This led to Western Union agreeing to a lesser position in the telephone competition, which in turn led to the lessening of the telegraph.

While the telegraph was not the focus of the legal battles that occurred around 1878, the companies that were affected by the effects of the battle were the main powers of telegraphy at the time. Western Union thought that the agreement of 1878 would solidify telegraphy as the long-range communication of choice. However, due to the underestimates of telegraph's future and poor contracts, Western Union found itself declining. AT&T acquired working control of Western Union in 1909 but relinquished it in 1914 under threat of antitrust action. AT&T bought Western Union's electronic mail and Telex businesses in 1990.

Although commercial "telegraph" services are still available in many countries, transmission is usually done via a computer network rather than a dedicated wired connection.

== See also ==
- 92 Code
- Aurora#Historically significant events
- American Telephone and Telegraph Company (AT&T)
- Bell Canada
- Geomagnetically induced current
- Great Northern Telegraph Company
- Neutral direct-current telegraph system
- Radiogram (message)
- Western Electric Company

== Bibliography ==
- Beauchamp, Ken (2001). History of Telegraphy. London: The Institution of Electrical Engineers. ISBN 978-0-85296-792-8.
- Bowers, Brian, Sir Charles Wheatstone: 1802–1875, IET, 2001 ISBN 0852961030
- Calvert, J. B. (2008). "The Electromagnetic Telegraph".
- Copeland, B. Jack, ed. (2006). Colossus: The Secrets of Bletchley Park's Codebreaking Computers. Oxford: Oxford University Press. ISBN 978-0-19-284055-4.
- Fahie, John Joseph (1884). A History of Electric Telegraphy, to the Year 1837. London: E. & F.N. Spon. OCLC 559318239.
- Figes, Orlando (2010). Crimea: The Last Crusade. London: Allen Lane. ISBN 978-0-7139-9704-0.
- Gibberd, William (1966). Australian Dictionary of Biography: Edward Davy.
- Hochfelder, David (2012). The Telegraph in America, 1832–1920. Johns Hopkins University Press. pp. 6–17, 138–141. ISBN 9781421407470.
- Holzmann, Gerard J.; Pehrson, Björn, The Early History of Data Networks, Wiley, 1995 ISBN 0818667826
- Huurdeman, Anton A. (2003). The Worldwide History of Telecommunications. Wiley-Blackwell. ISBN 978-0471205050.
- Jones, R. Victor (1999). Samuel Thomas von Sömmering's "Space Multiplexed" Electrochemical Telegraph (1808–1810). Archived from the original on 11 October 2012. Attributed to Michaelis, Anthony R. (1965), From semaphore to satellite, Geneva: International Telecommunication Union
- Kennedy, P. M. (October 1971). "Imperial Cable Communications and Strategy, 1870–1914". The English Historical Review. 86 (341): 728–752. doi:10.1093/ehr/lxxxvi.cccxli.728. JSTOR 563928.
- Kieve, Jeffrey L. (1973). The Electric Telegraph: A Social and Economic History. David and Charles. ISBN 0-7153-5883-9. OCLC 655205099.
- Mercer, David, The Telephone: The Life Story of a Technology, Greenwood Publishing Group, 2006 ISBN 031333207X
- Schwoch, James (2018). Wired into Nature: The Telegraph and the North American Frontier. University of Illinois Press. ISBN 978-0252041778.
