= The Whisperers: Private Life in Stalin's Russia =

Non-fiction work about life in Stalinist Russia

The Whisperers
- Book cover
- Author: Orlando Figes
- Audio read by: John Telfer
- Language: English
- Subject: Non-fiction work about life in Stalinist Russia
- Genre: History
- Publisher: Metropolitan Books (Print), Audible Studios (audiobook)
- Publication date: 2007 (Hardcover), 2008 (Paperback and Kindle), 2018 (audiobook)
- Publication place: United States
- Media type: Hardcover, Paperback, Kindle, Audiobook
- Pages: 740 pp. (hardcover); 29 hours and 47 minutes (audiobook)
- Awards: New York Times Notable Book (2007)
- ISBN: 978-0805074611
- Website: Book website (Macmillian)

The Whisperers: Private Life in Stalin's Russia is a history of private life in the Soviet Union during Stalinism, written by Orlando Figes. It was published in 2007 by Metropolitan Books and as an audiobook in 2018 by Audible Studios.

== Synopsis ==
The Whisperers is a social history of everyday private life in the Soviet Union during the era of Stalinism. The book begins with a background of the Russian Revolution and ends with the death of Stalin. According to Figes,

Many books describe the externals of the Terror – the arrests and trials, enslavements and killings of the Gulag – but The Whisperers is the first to explore in depth its influence on personal and family life. How did Soviet people live their private lives in the years of Stalin’s rule? What did they really think and feel? What sort of private life was possible in the cramped communal apartments, where the vast majority of the urban population lived, where rooms were shared by a whole family and often more than one, and every conversation could be overheard in the next room? What did private life mean when the state touched almost every aspect of it through legislation, surveillance and ideological control? (Note: The Whisperers, Introduction; Orlando Figes.)

As the statement reveals, the book is mainly focused on life during Stalinist urbanization and industrialization in the 1930s and how this affected the private lives of average Soviet citizens. The author seeks to reveal how individuals lived their private lives, how living in the Stalinist system affected thinking and memory, how it influenced the way individuals communicated with others in day-to-day life and how Stalinism changed the notion of self and family. Figes refers to the moral sphere of the family as he explores how family and internal lives were shaped by personal strategies and choices to survive difficult and often dire circumstances.

The Whisperers is based on an oral history and archival research project. Together with a team of Russian researchers from Memorial, Figes collected over 250 extensive interviews, along with letters, personal papers, memoirs, diaries, photographs, and physical artifacts "illuminating the inner world of ordinary Soviet citizens living under Stalin's tyranny." (Note: Memorial is part of the International Historical Educational Charitable and Human Rights Society) The title of the work incorporates two meanings of the Russian word for Whisperers; one meaning to speak softly and quietly for fear of being overheard by others, the second meaning individuals who inform or gossip about another, reflecting the atmosphere of fear that enveloped individuals during this era and the role informers played in creating this atmosphere.

== Reviews and recognition ==
Academic journals

- Epstein, Mikhail (2009). "The Whisperers: Private Life in Stalin's Russia (review)". Common Knowledge. 15 (3): 506–507. doi:10.1215/0961754x-2009-032. S2CID 143277132.
- Legvold, Robert (2007). "Review of The Whisperers: Private Life in Stalin's Russia". Foreign Affairs. 86 (6): 197. JSTOR 20032546.
- Marsh, Nicholas (2009). "Review of The Whisperers: Private Life in Stalin's Russia". Journal of Peace Research. 46 (3): 454–455. doi:10.1177/00223433090460030905. JSTOR 25654419. S2CID 110077525.
- Perks, Rob (2008). "Review of The Whisperers: Private Life in Stalin's Russia". Oral History. 36 (2). Oral History Society: 107–108. JSTOR 40179997.
- Rees, Edward Arfon (2008). "Review of The Whisperers: Private Life in Stalin's Russia". Europe-Asia Studies. 60 (7): 1265–1267. JSTOR 20451586.
- Viola, Lynne (2008). "Review of The Whisperers: Private Life in Stalin's Russia". Slavic Review. 67 (2): 440–443. doi:10.1017/S0037677900023640. JSTOR 27652854. S2CID 164335754.

Popular media

- Rubenstein, Joshua (25 November 2007). "Stalin's Children: Review of The Whisperers by Orlando Figes". The New York Times.

Awards and recognition

- New York Times Notable Book (2007).

Teaching

- Bellinger, Laura (2008). "Cultivating curiosity about complexity: what happens when Year 12 start to read Orlando Figes' "The Whisperers"?". Teaching History (132): 5–15. JSTOR 43259351.

== Release information ==
- Hardcover: 2007 (First Edition), Metropolitan Books (Macmillian), 740pp. ISBN 978-0805074611.
- Paperback: 2008 (First Edition), Metropolitan Books (Macmillian), 748pp. ISBN 978-0141013510.
- Audiobook: 2018, Narrated by John Telfer, Audible Studios, 29 hours and 47 minutes.

== Similar or related works ==
- Everyday Stalinism by Sheila Fitzpatrick, Oxford University Press (2007). (Note: Summary of Everyday Stalinism, Oxford University Press)
- Life and Terror in Stalin's Russia by Robert W. Thurston, Yale University Press (1998). (Note: Summary of Life and Terror in Stalin's Russia, Yale University Press)

== See also ==
- Stalinism
- History of the Soviet Union (1927–1953)
- Industrialization in the Soviet Union
- Collectivization in the Soviet Union
- Intensification of the class struggle under socialism
