= Orlando Figes =

British historian (born 1959)

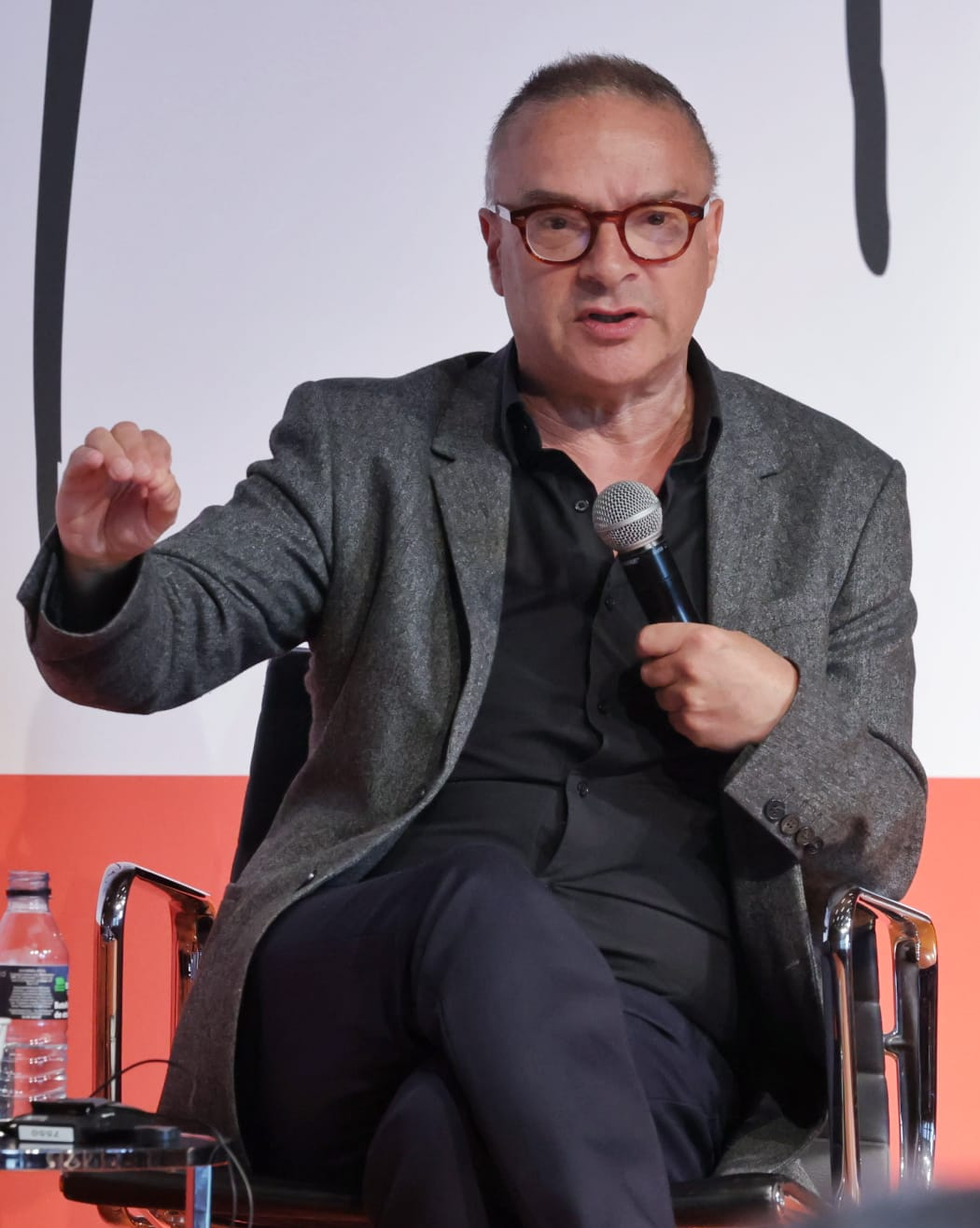
- Figes in 2023
- Born: Orlando Guy Figes; 20 November 1959 (age 67); London, England
- Citizenship: United Kingdom; Germany
- Spouse: Stephanie Palmer (m. 1990)
- Children: 2

Academic background
- Education: Gonville and Caius College, Cambridge (BA); Trinity College, Cambridge (PhD)
- Thesis: The Political Transformation of Peasant Russia: Peasant Soviets in the Middle Volga, 1917–1920 (1987)
- Doctoral advisor: Norman Stone

Academic work
- Discipline: Historian
- Institutions: Trinity College, Cambridge (1984–1999); Birkbeck College, University of London (1999–2022)
- Notable students: Andrew Roberts; Tristram Hunt; Bee Wilson; James Harding; Tanya Seghatchian
- Main interests: Russian Revolution; Stalinism
- Notable works: A People's Tragedy (1996)
- Website: www.orlandofiges.com

Orlando Guy Figes (/ɔːrˈlændoʊ ɡaɪ ˈfaɪdʒiːz/ or-LAN-doh GHYE FYE-jeez; born 20 November 1959) is a British and German historian and writer. He was a professor of history at Birkbeck College, University of London, where he was made Emeritus Professor on his retirement in 2022.

Figes is known for his works on Russian history, such as A People's Tragedy (1996), Natasha's Dance (2002), The Whisperers: Private Life in Stalin's Russia (2007), Crimea (2010) and Just Send Me Word (2012). A People's Tragedy is a study of the Russian Revolution, and combines social and political history with biographical details in a historical narrative. Figes has also contributed on European history more broadly with his book The Europeans (2019).

== Biography ==
=== Family background and education ===
Born in Islington, London, on 20 November 1959, Figes is the son of John George Figes and the feminist writer Eva Figes, whose Jewish family fled Nazi Germany in 1939. The author and editor Kate Figes was his elder sister. His father left the family when he was three.

He attended William Ellis School in north London (1971–78) and studied history at Gonville and Caius College, Cambridge, where his teachers were Peter Burke and Norman Stone, graduating with a double-starred first in 1982. He wrote his undergraduate dissertation under Stone's guidance (with help from Isaiah Berlin) on 'Ludwig Börne and the Formation of a Radical Critique of Judaism' and published it as a journal article in the Leo Baeck Institute Year Book in 1984. He completed his PhD on 'The political transformation of peasant Russia: peasant Soviets in the Middle Volga, 1917–1920' under Norman Stone's supervision at Trinity College, Cambridge in 1987. It was his supervisor who suggested the shift of topic from German-Jewish philosophy to Russian peasant history. He also claimed to have taken inspiration from the work of Teodor Shanin for his thesis, and received Shanin's recommendation to study with Viktor Danilov in Moscow. Danilov helped him get "unprecedented" access to the Soviet archives.

=== Academic career ===
Figes was a Fellow of Trinity College from 1984 to 1999. He was appointed University Lecturer at the Faculty of History, University of Cambridge in 1987. His students at Cambridge included the historians Andrew Roberts and Tristram Hunt, the food writer Bee Wilson, the journalist James Harding, and the film producer Tanya Seghatchian.

He succeeded Richard J. Evans as professor of history at Birkbeck College, University of London in 1999. He announced his retirement from the post in 2022.

He has served on the editorial board of the journal Russian History since at least 2011, writes for the international press, broadcasts on television and radio, reviews for The New York Review of Books, and is a fellow of the Royal Society of Literature.

During his career, he was involved in an international summer school for history teachers in Russian universities organised by the European University of St Petersburg.

== Writing ==
=== Works on the Russian Revolution ===
Figes's first three books were on the Russian Revolution and the Civil War. Peasant Russia, Civil War (1989) was a detailed study of the peasantry in the Volga region during the Revolution and the Civil War (1917–21). Using village Soviet archives, Figes emphasised the autonomous nature of the agrarian revolution during 1917–18, showing how it developed according to traditional peasant notions of social justice independently of the Provisional Government, the Bolsheviks or other urban-based parties. He also demonstrated how the function of the rural Soviets was transformed in the course of the Civil War as they were taken over by younger and more literate peasants and migrant townsmen, many of them veterans of the First World War or Red Army soldiers, who became the rural bureaucrats of the emerging Bolshevik regime.

A People's Tragedy (1996) is a panoramic history of the Revolution from 1891 to the death of Vladimir Lenin in 1924. It combines social and political history and interweaves through the public narrative the personal stories of several representative figures, including Grigory Rasputin, the writer Maxim Gorky, Prince Georgy Lvov and General Alexei Brusilov, as well as unknown peasants and workers. Figes wrote that he had "tried to present the revolution not as a march of abstract social forces and ideologies but as a human event of complicated individual tragedies". Left-wing critics have represented Figes as a conservative because of his negative assessment of Lenin and his focus on the individual and "the random succession of chance events" rather than on the collective actions of the masses. Others have situated Figes among the so-called 'revisionist' historians of the Revolution who attempted to explain its political development in terms of social history. In 2008, The Times Literary Supplement listed A People's Tragedy as one of the "hundred most influential books since the war". In 2013 David Bowie named A People's Tragedy one of his 'top 100 books'.

Interpreting the Russian Revolution: The Language and Symbols of 1917 (1999), co-written with Boris Kolonitskii, analyses the political language, revolutionary songs, visual symbols and historical ideas that animated the revolutionary crowds of 1917.

Revolutionary Russia: 1891–1991 is a short introduction to the subject published as part of the relaunch of Pelican Books in the United Kingdom in 2014. In it Figes argues for the need to see the Russian Revolution in a longer time-frame than most historians have allowed. He states that his aim is 'to chart one hundred years of history as a single revolutionary cycle. In this telling the Revolution starts in the nineteenth century (and more specifically in 1891, when the public's reaction to the famine crisis set it for the first time on a collision course with the autocracy) and ends with the collapse of the Soviet regime in 1991.'

=== Natasha's Dance and Russian cultural history ===
Published in 2002, Natasha's Dance is a broad cultural history of Russia from the building of St. Petersburg during the reign of Peter the Great in the early eighteenth century. Taking its title from a scene in Tolstoy's War and Peace, where the young countess Natasha Rostova intuitively dances a peasant dance, it explores the tensions between the European and folk elements of Russian culture, and examines how the myth of the "Russian soul" and the idea of "Russianness" itself have been expressed by Russian writers, artists, composers and philosophers.

Figes has also written essays on various Russian cultural figures, including Leo Tolstoy, Dmitri Shostakovich, Sergei Prokofiev and Andrei Platonov. In 2003 he wrote and presented a TV feature documentary for the BBC, The Tsar's Last Picture Show, about the pioneering colour photographer in Tsarist Russia Sergei Prokudin-Gorsky.

=== The Whisperers: Private Life in Stalin's Russia ===
His book The Whisperers Figes followed the approach of oral history. In partnership with the Memorial Society, a human rights non-profit organization, Figes gathered several hundred private family archives from homes across Russia and carried out more than a thousand interviews with survivors as well as perpetrators of the Stalinist repressions. The material is stored by Memorial in its Moscow, St Petersburg and Perm offices, and a selection of the documents and interviews is available on Figes's personal website.

Translated into more than twenty languages, The Whisperers was described by Andrey Kurkov as "one of the best literary monuments to the Soviet people" In it Figes underlined the importance of oral testimonies for the recovery of the history of repression in the former Soviet Union. While conceding that, "like all memory, the testimony given in an interview is unreliable", he said that oral testimony "can be cross-examined and tested against other evidence".

The Whisperers deals mainly with the impact of repression on private life. It examines the influence of the Soviet regime and its campaigns of terror on family relationships, emotions and beliefs, moral choices, issues of personal and social identity, and collective memory. According to Figes, 'the real power and lasting legacy of the Stalinist system were neither in structures of the state, nor in the cult of the leader, but, as the Russian historian Mikhail Gefter once remarked, "in the Stalinism that entered into all of us".'

The book includes a detailed study of the Soviet writer Konstantin Simonov, who became a leading figure in the Union of Soviet Writers and a propagandist in the "anti-cosmopolitan" campaign during Stalin's final years. Figes drew on the closed sections of Simonov's archive in the Russian State Archive of Literature and Art and on the archives of the poet's wife and son to produce his study of this major Soviet establishment figure.

On 4 December 2008, the St Petersburg offices of Memorial were raided by the police and the entire electronic archive, including the materials collected with Figes for The Whisperers, was confiscated by the authorities. Figes condemned the police raid, accusing the Russian authorities of trying to rehabilitate the Stalinist regime. He organised an open protest letter to President Dmitry Medvedev and other Russian leaders, which was signed by several hundred leading academics from across the world. After several court hearings, the materials were finally returned to Memorial in May 2009.

Figes saw his first Russian translation contract for The Whisperers cancelled in March 2009 by publisher Attikus, who cited commercial reasons. Figes suggested that the book was "inconvenient" to Vladimir Putin's government and that the real explanation for the refusal to publish lay in "political pressure". A second translation project was abandoned by the publisher Corpus and the rights owner Dynasty Foundation in 2010 after one of Memorial's researchers reported that she found anachronisms, incorrect interpretations and factual errors in the book. Figes was notified of the decision in April 2011 in a letter which suggested that its publication would cause offence in Russia. Figes offered to revise the book, but his offer was ignored.

=== Just Send Me Word ===
Published in 2012, Just Send Me Word is a true story based on 1,246 letters smuggled in and out of the Pechora labour camp between 1946 and 1955 between Lev Mishchenko (a prisoner) and Svetlana Ivanova (his girlfriend in Moscow). There are 647 letters from Lev to Svetlana, and 599 from her to him. They form part of a family archive discovered by Memorial and delivered in three trunks to their Moscow offices in 2007. The letters are the largest known collection of private correspondence from the Gulag, according to Memorial.

Figes was given exclusive access to the letters and other parts of the archive, which is also based on interviews with the couple when they were in their nineties, and the archives of the labour camp itself. Figes raised the finance for the transcription of the letters, which are housed in Memorial's offices in Moscow and will become available to researchers in 2013. According to Figes, "Lev's letters are the only major real-time record of daily life in the Gulag that has ever come to light."

The book tells the story of Lev and Svetlana who met as students in the Physics Faculty of Moscow University in 1935. Separated by the Second World War in 1941, when Lev was enrolled in the Red Army, they made contact in 1946, when he wrote from Pechora. Figes uses the letters to explore conditions in the labour camp and to tell the love story, ending in 1955 with Lev's release and marriage to Svetlana. The book documents five illegal trips made by Svetlana to visit Lev by smuggling herself into the labour camp.

Writing in the Financial Times, Simon Sebag Montefiore called Just Send Me Word "a unique contribution to Gulag scholarship as well as a study of the universal power of love". Several reviewers highlighted the book's literary qualities, pointing out that it 'reads like a novel'

=== Crimea ===
Crimea: The Last Crusade is a panoramic history of the Crimean War of 1853–56. Drawing extensively from Russian, French and Ottoman as well as British archives, it combines military, diplomatic, political and cultural history, examining how the war left a lasting mark on the national consciousness of Britain, France, Russia and Turkey. Figes sets the war in the context of the Eastern Question, the diplomatic and political problems caused by the decay of the Ottoman Empire. In particular, he emphasises the importance of the religious struggle between Russia as the defender of the Orthodox and France as the protector of the Catholics in the Ottoman Empire. He frames the war within a longer history of religious conflict between Christians and Muslims in the Balkans, southern Russia and the Caucasus that continues to this day. Figes stresses the religious motive of the Tsar Nicholas I in his bold decision to go to war, arguing that Nicholas was swayed by the ideas of the Pan-Slavs to invade Moldavia and Wallachia and encourage Slav revolts against the Ottomans, despite his earlier adherence to the Legitimist principles of the Holy Alliance. He also shows how France and Britain were drawn into the war by popular ideas of Russophobia that swept across Europe in the wake of the Revolutions of 1830 and 1848. As one reviewer wrote, Figes shows "how the cold war of the Soviet era froze over fundamental fault lines that had opened up in the 19th century."

=== The Europeans ===
The Europeans: Three Lives and the Making of a Cosmopolitan Culture is a panoramic history of nineteenth-century European culture told through the biographies of Pauline Viardot, the opera singer, composer and salon hostess, her husband Louis Viardot, an art expert and theatre manager, and the Russian writer Ivan Turgenev, who had a long love affair with Pauline Viardot and lived with the couple in a ménage à trois for over twenty years. They lived at various times in Paris, Baden-Baden, London, Courtavenel and Bougival.

Figes argues that the pan-European culture formed through new technologies (especially the railways and lithographic printing), mass foreign travel, market forces, and the development of international copyright, enabling writers, artists and composers as well as their publishers to enter foreign markets through the growth of literary translations, touring companies and international publishing. In the continent as a whole, the arts thus became "a unifying force between nations" leading to the emergence of a modern European 'canon' so that, by 1900, "the same books were being read across the Continent, the same paintings reproduced, the same music played at home or heard in concert halls, and the same operas performed in all the major theatres of Europe".

The Europeans was published in the United Kingdom in September 2019 and received positive reviews by William Boyd and Rupert Christiansen.

=== The Story of Russia ===
Figes published The Story of Russia in September 2022. The book is a general history of Russia from the earliest times to the Russian invasion of Ukraine. It focuses on the ideas and myths that have structured the Russians' understanding of their history, and explores what Figes calls the "structural continuities" of Russian history, such as the sacralisation of power and patrimonial autocracy. The Guardian described it as "An indispensable survey of more than 1,000 years of history [which] shows how myth and fact mix dangerously in the tales this crucial country tells about itself" A reviewer in The Spectator called it "a saga of multi-millennial identity politics"; Figes argues that no other country has so often changed its origin story, its "[h]istories continuously reconfigured and repurposed to suit its present needs and reimagine its future".

== Plays ==
In 2023 Figes's debut play, The Oyster Problem, was produced by the Jermyn Street Theatre in London. The play is about the financial crisis of the writer Gustave Flaubert in the last years of his life and the attempts of his literary friends, George Sand, Emile Zola and Ivan Turgenev, to find him a sinecure. Bob Barrett played the part of Flaubert and Philip Wilson directed. Everything Theatre described The Oyster Problem as "a remarkable pearl of a play; a patchwork of anecdotes that welcomes us into the private life of Gustave Flaubert and his literary contemporaries"

== Film and television work ==
Figes has contributed frequently to radio and television broadcasts in the United Kingdom and around the world. In 1999 he wrote a six-part educational TV series on the history of Communism under the title Red Chapters. Produced by Opus Television and broadcast in the UK, the 25-minute films featured turning-points in the history of Soviet Russia, China, and Cuba. In 2003 he wrote and presented a TV feature documentary for the BBC, The Tsar's Last Picture Show, about the pioneering colour photographer in Russia Sergei Prokudin-Gorsky. In 2007 he wrote and presented two 60-minute Archive Hour programmes on radio entitled Stalin's Silent People which used recordings from his oral history project with Memorial that formed the basis of his book The Whisperers. The programmes are available on Figes's website.

Figes was the historical consultant on the film Anna Karenina (2012), directed by Joe Wright, starring Keira Knightley and Jude Law with a screenplay by Tom Stoppard. He was also credited as the historical consultant on the 2016 BBC War & Peace television series directed by Tom Harper with a screenplay by Andrew Davies. Interviewed by the Sunday Telegraph, Figes defended the series against criticism that it was "too Jane Austen" and "too English".

== Theatrical adaptations ==
Figes's The Whisperers was adapted and performed by Rupert Wickham as a one-man play, Stalin's Favourite. Based on Figes's portrayal of the writer Konstantin Simonov, the play was performed in London at the National Theatre in November 2011 and at the Unicorn Theatre in January 2012.

== Sanctions by Russian government ==
Figes has been critical of the Vladimir Putin government, in particular alleging that Putin has attempted to rehabilitate Joseph Stalin and impose his own agenda on history-teaching in Russian schools and universities. He condemned the arrest by the FSB of historian Mikhail Suprun as part of a "Putinite campaign against freedom of historical research and expression".

In December 2013, Figes wrote a long piece in the US journal Foreign Affairs on the Euromaidan demonstrations in Kyiv suggesting that a referendum on Ukraine's foreign policy and the country's possible partition might be a preferable alternative to the possibility of civil war and military intervention by Russia. In June 2023, he said that Russia "needs to be completely defeated" in the Russo-Ukrainian War, "not just for Ukraine's sake, but for Russia's sake".

In February 2024, Figes was sanctioned with denial of entry into Russia by Vladimir Putin's government, together with other British academics and experts, for criticizing the war in Ukraine and allegedly demonizing Russia.

== Amazon reviews controversy ==
In 2010, Figes posted several pseudonymous reviews under the moniker "orlando-birkbeck" on the UK site of the online bookseller Amazon. The reviews criticised works by two other British historians of Russia, Robert Service and Rachel Polonsky, but praised other books, including one of his own. After initially denying that he wrote these reviews, Figes took full responsibility for them, apologized and agreed to pay for legal costs and damages to Polonsky and Service who launched a lawsuit against Figes.

== Views ==
In an interview with Andrew Marr in 1997, Figes described himself as "a Labour Party supporter and 'a bit of a Tony Blair man', though he confessed, when it came to the Russian revolution, to being mildly pro-Menshevik."

In 2018, when asked to comment on the popularity of Marxism among the student supporters of Jeremy Corbyn, he expressed concern that British university textbooks were drawing a "moral equivalence" between the economic achievements of the Soviet Union and the "murder and destruction" of Stalinism.

== Personal life ==
In 1990, Figes married Stephanie Palmer, a senior lecturer in law at Cambridge University and barrister at Blackstone Chambers. They have two daughters. He divides his time between his homes in London and Umbria in Italy. On 13 February 2017, Figes became a German citizen.

== Prizes and honours ==
- 1997 – Wolfson History Prize A People's Tragedy: The Russian Revolution 1891–1924
- 1997 – WH Smith Literary Award A People's Tragedy: The Russian Revolution 1891–1924
- 1997 – NCR Book Award A People's Tragedy: The Russian Revolution 1891–1924
- 1997 – Longman-History Today Book Prize A People's Tragedy: The Russian Revolution 1891–1924
- 1997 – Los Angeles Times Book Prize A People's Tragedy: The Russian Revolution 1891–1924
- 2009 – Przeglad Wschodni Award Natasha's Dance: A Cultural History of Russia.
- 2021 – Antonio Delgado Prize (Spain), The Europeans: Three Lives and the Making of a Cosmopolitan Culture

In 2023, Figes was awarded an honorary degree by the Menéndez Pelayo International University in Santander, Spain.

== Works ==
- Peasant Russia, Civil War: The Volga Countryside in Revolution, 1917–21, Oxford: Clarendon Press, 1989 ISBN 0-19-822898-8
- A People's Tragedy: The Russian Revolution 1891–1924, London: Jonathan Cape, 1996 ISBN 0-22-404162-2
- (with Boris Kolonitskii) Interpreting the Russian Revolution: The Language and Symbols of 1917, Yale University Press, 1999 ISBN 0-300-08106-5
- Natasha's Dance: A Cultural History of Russia, London: Allen Lane, 2002 ISBN 0-71-399517-3
- The Whisperers: Private Life in Stalin's Russia, London: Allen Lane, 2007 ISBN 0-71-399702-8
- Crimea: The Last Crusade, London: Allen Lane, 2010 ISBN 0-71-399704-4
- Just Send Me Word: A True Story of Love and Survival in the Gulag, London: Allen Lane, 2012 ISBN 1-84-614488-4
- Revolutionary Russia, 1891–1991, London: Metropolitan Books, 2014 ISBN 0-80-509131-9
- The Europeans: Three Lives and the Making of a Cosmopolitan Culture, London: Metropolitan Books, 2019 ISBN 1-62-779214-7
- The Story of Russia, Bloomsbury Publishing, 2022 ISBN 1-52-663174-1

== Sources ==
- "Orlando Figes [Home]". Orlando Figes (personal website).
- Dammann, Guy (14 July 2008). "Interview: Guy Dammann talks to Orlando Figes". The Guardian.
- Snowman, Daniel (2007), "Orlando Figes", Historians, Basingstoke: Palgrave Macmillan, pp. 198–207, doi:10.1007/978-0-230-59997-0_19, ISBN 978-1-349-54191-1
