= Crimea: The Last Crusade =

2010 book by Orlando Figes

The Crimean War: A History
- First edition
- Author: Orlando Figes
- Subject: History
- Published: 2010
- Publisher: Allen Lane
- Media type: Print
- Pages: 575
- ISBN: 0713997044

Crimea: The Last Crusade is a book by Orlando Figes. Figes argued that the Crimean War was the first truly modern war and that the Siege of Sevastopol was a precursor of trench warfare. He also emphasized the religious aspects of the Crimean War and the importance of public opinion.

In the United States the book has been published under the title The Crimean War: A History.

== Reception ==
Gary J. Bass of Princeton University praised Figes "painstaking archival work". Angus Macqueen commented in The Guardian that Figes underlines how the Cold War "froze over fundamental fault lines that had opened up in the 19th century". Oliver Bullough in The Independent called the book "lucid, well-written, alive and sensitive". He praised it for its "startling immediacy", for highlighting parallels with contemporary conflicts and for describing the impact of high politics on ordinary people. Nevertheless, he also wrote that the book is not perfect and that the sourcing is problematic.
