= Christopher Read =

British historian

- Born: 1946 (age 79–80)
- Occupation: Historian

Academic background
- Education: University of Keele, University of Glasgow, London School of Economics

Academic work
- Discipline: History of the Soviet Union
- Sub-discipline: Intellectual history of the Russian intelligentsia 1900 - 1925; Social history of the Russian Revolution
- Institutions: 1973- History Department, University of Warwick
- Website: Publications by Christopher Read at ResearchGate

Christopher Read (born 1946) is a British historian of the Soviet Union.

== Works ==
- Religion, Revolution and The Russian Intelligentsia (1979)
- Culture and Power in Revolutionary Russia (1990)
- From Tsar to Soviets: The Russian People and Their Revolution (1996)
- The Making and Breaking of the Soviet System: An Interpretation (2001)
- The Stalin Years: A Reader (2003)
- Lenin: A Revolutionary Life (2005)
- War and Revolution in Russia: 1914–22, The Collapse of Tsarism and the Establishment of Soviet Power (2013)
