= My Father's Daughter =

2010 memoir by Sheila Fitzpatrick

- Author: Sheila Fitzpatrick
- Cover artist: Sandra Nobes
- Language: English
- Published: 2010
- Publisher: Melbourne University Press
- Publication place: Australia
- Pages: 260
- ISBN: 9780522857474
- OCLC: 864814519
- Dewey Decimal: 920.72
- LC Class: PR9619.3.F517

My Father's Daughter is a personal memoir by Sheila Fitzpatrick published in 2010 by the Melbourne University Press.

In 2011, it was shortlisted for the National Biography Award, and in 2012 won the ASAL Awards — The Australian Historical Association Awards — Magarey Medal for Biography.

== Critical reception ==
Writing in Australian Book Review Brenda Niall noted: "This memoir, written forty-five years after her father's death, is an act of reparation. She recalls his intelligence, generosity and kindness, and above all the unconditional love he gave her. Whatever she did, he was there to applaud. By contrast, she remembers her mother's refusal to praise, and the grudging attitude that gave the Fitzpatrick house its chronic unhappiness...This candid, poised, and emotionally resonant memoir shows the author as her mother’s daughter as well as her father's."
