= Sheila Fitzpatrick =

Australian historian (born 1941)

- Born: 4 June 1941 (age 85); Melbourne, Australia
- Citizenship: Australian, American
- Occupations: Historian, academic
- Relatives: Brian Fitzpatrick
- Awards: Mellon Foundation Award

Academic background
- Education: University of Melbourne; St Antony's College, Oxford
- Thesis: The Commissariat of Education under Lunacharsky (1917–1921) (1969)
- Doctoral advisor: Max Hayward

Academic work
- Discipline: Modern history
- Sub-discipline: History of the Soviet Union
- School or tradition: Chicago School of Soviet history Revisionist School of Soviet studies
- Institutions: London School of Slavonic and East European Studies (1969–1972); Columbia University (1976–1980); University of Texas at Austin (1980–1989); University of Chicago (1990–2012); University of Sydney (2010–); Australian Catholic University (2012–)
- Doctoral students: Mark Edele
- Main interests: Stalinism; Soviet culture Soviet education everyday life
- Notable works: Beyond Totalitarianism (2009); Everyday Stalinism (1999); Stalin's Peasants (1994)
- Website: sydney.edu.au/arts/history/staff/profiles/sheila.fitzpatrick.php

Sheila Mary Fitzpatrick (born 4 June 1941) is an Australian historian, whose main subjects are history of the Soviet Union and history of modern Russia, especially the Stalin era and the Great Purges, of which she proposes a "history from below", and is part of the "revisionist school" of Communist historiography. She has also critically reviewed the concept of totalitarianism and highlighted the differences between Nazi Germany and the Soviet Union in debates about comparison of Nazism and Stalinism.

Fitzpatrick is professor at the Australian Catholic University (Melbourne), honorary professor at the University of Sydney, and Distinguished Service Professor Emerita at the University of Chicago. Prior to this, she taught Soviet history at the University of Texas at Austin and was the Bernadotte Everly Schmitt Distinguished Service Professor at the University of Chicago. She is considered a founder of the field of Soviet social history.

== Family ==
Sheila Fitzpatrick was born in Melbourne in 1941, the daughter of Australian author Brian Fitzpatrick and his second wife Dorothy Mary Davies. Her younger brother was the historian David P. B. Fitzpatrick.

Fitzpatrick's first marriage to Alex Bruce, a fellow University of Melbourne student, soon ended. Her second marriage to the political scientist Jerry F. Hough, from 1975 to 1983, ended in divorce. While living in the United States, Fitzpatrick married the theoretical physicist Michael Danos (1922-1999).

== Biography ==
Fitzpatrick attended the University of Melbourne (BA, 1961) and received her doctorate from St Antony's College, Oxford, with a thesis entitled The Commissariat of Education under Lunacharsky (1917–1921) (1969). She was a research fellow at the London School of Slavonic and East European Studies from 1969 to 1972.

Fitzpatrick is a member of the American Academy of Arts and Sciences and the Australian Academy of the Humanities. She is a past president of the American Association for the Advancement of Slavic Studies and the American Association for Slavic and Eastern European Studies. In 2002, she received an award from the Mellon Foundation for her academic work. From September 1996 to December 2006, Fitzpatrick was co-editor of The Journal of Modern History with John W. Boyer and Jan E. Goldstein. In 2012, Fitzpatrick received both the award for Distinguished Contributions to Slavic, East European, and Eurasian Studies from the Association for Slavic, East European and Eurasian Studies, and the American Historical Association's award for Scholarly Distinction, the highest honour awarded in historical studies in the United States. In 2016, Fitzpatrick won the Prime Minister's Award for non-fiction for her book On Stalin's Team: The Years of Living Dangerously in Soviet Politics (2015).

She spent fifty years living outside Australia. This included periods in Britain, the Soviet Union, and twenty years in the United States, before moving back to Australia in 2012. She won the 2012 Magarey Medal for biography for her memoir My Father's Daughter: Memories of an Australian Childhood. A second volume of her memoirs A Spy in the Archives was published in 2013. In 2017, Fitzpatrick published a memoir-biography of her late husband Michael Danos, Mischka's War: A European Odyssey of the 1940s, which was short-listed for the Prime Minister's Award for non-fiction in 2018. In addition to her research, she plays the violin in orchestras and chamber music groups.

Fitzpatrick has been awarded Discovery Grants by the Australian Research Council for joint projects in 2010 with Stephen G. Wheatcroft for Rethinking the History of Soviet Stalinism, in 2013 with Mark Edele for War and Displacement: From the Soviet Union to Australia in the Wake of the Second World War, and in 2016 with Ruth Balint and Jayne Persian for Postwar Russian Displaced Persons arriving in Australia via the China Route. Since her return to Australia, in addition to continuing her research and writing on Soviet history, such as On Stalin's Team: The Years of Living Dangerously in Soviet Politics, Fitzpatrick has been working and publishing on Australian immigration, particularly displaced persons after World War II and during the Cold War, such as White Russians, Red Peril: A Cold War History of Migration to Australia.

== Research ==
Writing in The American Historical Review, Roberta T. Manning reviewed Fitzpatrick's work, stating: "In the late 1970s and early 1980s, Sheila Fitzpatrick almost singlehandedly created the field of Soviet social history with an impressive series of pioneering, now classic studies: The Cultural Revolution in Russia, 1928–1931 (1978), Education and Social Mobility in the Soviet Union, 1921–1934 (1979), and The Russian Revolution (1982). Book after book opened entirely new areas of research, explored old subjects from new perspectives, and forever altered the way experts perceived the USSR between 1917 and the outbreak of World War II."

Her research focuses on the social and cultural history of the Stalinist period, particularly on aspects of social identity and daily life, and the social and cultural changes in Soviet Russia of the 1950s and 1960s. In her early works, she focused on the theme of social mobility, suggesting that the opportunity for the working class to rise socially and as a new elite had been instrumental in legitimizing the regime during the Stalinist period. Despite its brutality, Stalinism as a political culture would have achieved the goals of a democratic revolution. The center of attention was always focused on the victims of the purges rather than its beneficiaries, as thousands of workers and communists who had access to the technical colleges during the first five-year plan received promotions to positions in industry, government, and the leadership of the All-Union Communist Party (Bolsheviks) as a consequence of the Great Purge. For Fitzpatrick, the "cultural revolution" of the late 1920s and the purges which shook the scientific, literary, artistic, and the industrial communities is explained in part by a class struggle against executives and intellectual bourgeois. The men who rose in the 1930s played an active role to get rid of former leaders who blocked their own promotion, and the Great Turn found its origins in initiatives from the bottom rather than the decisions of the summit. In this vision, Stalinist policy was based on social forces and offered a response to popular radicalism, which allowed the existence of a partial consensus between the regime and society in the 1930s.

In Beyond Totalitarianism: Stalinism and Nazism Compared, Fitzpatrick and Michael Geyer disputed the concept of totalitarianism, stating that it entered political discourse first as a term of self-description by the Italian Fascists and was only later used as a framework to compare Nazi Germany with the Soviet Union, which were not as monolithic or as ideology-driven as they seemed. Without calling them "totalitarian", they identified their common features, including genocide, an all-powerful party, a charismatic leader, and pervasive invasion of privacy; however, they stated that Nazism and Stalinism did not represent a new and unique type of government but rather can be placed in the broader context of the turn to dictatorship in Europe in the interwar period. The reason they appear extraordinary is because they were the "most prominent, most hard-headed, and most violent" of the European dictatorships of the 20th century. They stated they are comparable because of their "shock and awe" and sheer ruthlessness but underneath superficial similarities were fundamentally different, and "when it comes to one-on-one comparison, the two societies and regimes may as well have hailed from different worlds."

== Historiographical debates ==
Academic Sovietology after World War II and during the Cold War was dominated by the "totalitarian model" of the Soviet Union, stressing the absolute nature of Joseph Stalin's power. The "revisionist school" beginning in the 1960s focused on relatively autonomous institutions which might influence policy at the higher level. Matt Lenoe described the "revisionist school" as representing those who "insisted that the old image of the Soviet Union as a totalitarian state bent on world domination was oversimplified or just plain wrong. They tended to be interested in social history and to argue that the Communist Party leadership had had to adjust to social forces." Fitzpatrick was one of a number of "revisionist school" historians who challenged the traditional approach to Soviet history, as outlined by political scientist Carl Joachim Friedrich, which stated that the Soviet Union was a totalitarian system, with the personality cult, and almost unlimited powers of the "great leader" such as Stalin.

As the leader of the second generation of the "revisionist school", or "revisionist historians", Fitzpatrick was the first to call the group of historians working on Soviet history in the 1980s "a new cohort of [revisionist school] historians." Fitzpatrick called for a social history that did not address political issues and adhered strictly to a "from below" viewpoint. This was justified by the idea that the university had been strongly conditioned to see everything through the prism of the state, hence "the social processes unrelated to the intervention of the state is virtually absent from the literature." Fitzpatrick did not deny that the state's role in social change of the 1930s was huge and defended the practice of social history "without politics", as most young "revisionist school" historians did not want to separate the social history of the Soviet Union from the evolution of the political system. Fitzpatrick explained that in the 1980s, when the "totalitarian model" was still widely used, "it was very useful to show that the model had an inherent bias and it did not explain everything about Soviet society. Now, whereas a new generation of academics considers sometimes as self evident that the totalitarian model was completely erroneous and harmful, it is perhaps more useful to show than there were certain things about the Soviet company that it explained very well."

== Bibliography ==
=== Books ===
- The Commissariat of Enlightenment: Soviet Organization of Education and the Arts Under Lunacharsky, 1917–1921. Cambridge University Press. 1970.
- Education and Social Mobility in the Soviet Union, 1921–1932. Cambridge University Press. 1979 1st ed.; paperback ed. 2002.
- The Russian Revolution. Oxford University Press. 1st ed. 1982; 2nd revised ed. 1994; 3rd revised ed. 2007. ISBN 978-0-19-923767-8. Translated into Braille, Czech, Italian, Korean, Polish, Portuguese, Russian, Spanish and Turkish.
- The Cultural Front. Power and Culture in Revolutionary Russia. Cornell University Press. 1992.
- Stalin's Peasants: Resistance and Survival in the Russian Village after Collectivization. Oxford University Press. 1st ed. 1994; paperback ed. 1996. Translated into Russian.
- Everyday Stalinism: Ordinary Life in Extraordinary Times: Soviet Russia in the 1930s. Oxford University Press. 1st ed. 1999; paperback ed. 2000. ISBN 0-19-505001-0 Translated into Czech, French, Polish, Russian, and Spanish.
- Tear Off the Masks! Identity and Imposture in Twentieth-Century Russia. Princeton University Press. 2005. Translated into Chinese and Russian.
- My Father's Daughter. Melbourne University Publishing. 2010. ISBN 9780522857474. OCLC 506020660.
- A Spy in the Archives. Melbourne University Press. 2013. Translated into Turkish.
- On Stalin's Team: The Years of Living Dangerously in Soviet Politics. Princeton University Press. 1st ed. 2015; paperback ed. 2017. Translated into Czech, French, German, Greek, Polish, Russian, and Spanish.
- Mischka's War: A European Odyssey of the 1940s. Melbourne University Press & I. B. Tauris. 2017.
- White Russians, Red Peril: A Cold War History of Migration to Australia. La Trobe University Press. 2021.
- The Shortest History of the Soviet Union. Old Street Publishing. 2022
- Lost Souls: Soviet Displaced Persons and the Birth of the Cold War. Princeton University Press. 2024.
- The Death of Stalin. Old Street Publishing. 2025.

=== Articles ===
- "Ascribing Class: The Construction of Social Identity in Soviet Russia" (1993). The Journal of Modern History. 65: (4). JSTOR 2124540.
- "Vengeance and Ressentiment in the Russian Revolution" (2001). French Historical Studies. 24: (4). doi:10.1215/00161071-24-4-579.
- "Politics as Practice: Thoughts on a New Soviet Political History" (2004). Kritika. 5: (1). doi:10.1353/kri.2004.0009.
- "Happiness and Toska: A Study of Emotions in 1930s Russia" (2004). Australian Journal of Politics and History. 50: (3). doi:10.1111/j.1467-8497.2004.00339.x.
- "Social Parasites: How Tramps, Idle Youth, and Busy Entrepreneurs Impeded the Soviet March to Communism" (2006). Cahiers du monde russe et soviétique. 47: 1–2. JSTOR 20175002.
- "The Soviet Union in the Twenty-First Century" (2007). Journal of European Studies. 37: (1). doi:10.1177/0047244107074186.
- "A Spy in the Archives" (2010). London Review of Books. 32 (23): 3–8.

=== Book reviews ===
Year	Review article	Work(s) reviewed
2014	Fitzpatrick, Sheila (September 2014). "'One of Us': The Spy Who Relished Deception". Australian Book Review. 364: 27–28.	Macintyre, Ben (2014). A Spy Among Friends: Kim Philby and the Great Betrayal. Bloomsbury Publishing. ISBN 9781408851739.
2020	Fitzpatrick, Sheila (6 February 2020). "Which Face? Emigrés on the Make". London Review of Books. 42 (3): 7–9.	Tromly, Benjamin (2019). Cold War Exiles and the CIA: Plotting to Free Russia. Oxford University Press. ISBN 9780198840404. Reddaway, Peter (2020). The Dissidents: A Memoir of Working with the Resistance in Russia, 1960–90. Brookings Institution. ISBN 9780815737735.
2020	Fitzpatrick, Sheila (10 September 2020). "Whatever Made Him". London Review of Books. 42 (17): 9–11.	Wagner, Izabela (2020). Bauman: A Biography. Polity. ISBN 9781509526864.
2021	Fitzpatrick, Sheila (January–February 2021). "Knotty problems : an examination of Europe's displaced persons". Australian Book Review. 428: 12, 14.	Nasaw, David (2020). The last million : Europe's displaced persons from World War to Cold War. Allen Lane.
