= Brian Fitzpatrick (Australian writer) =

Australian writer, historian and journalist

Brian Charles Fitzpatrick (17 November 1905 – 3 September 1965) was a writer, historian, journalist and one of the founders of the Australian Council for Civil Liberties.

== Life and career ==
Fitzpatrick was born in Warrnambool, Victoria, the seventh of eight children. His father died when Brian was 14 years old. Brian rebelled against his oldest brother's management of the family after his father's death.

Fitzpatrick was educated at Essendon High School and then at the University of Melbourne on a scholarship. He graduated Bachelor of Arts (with honours) in 1925 and Master of Arts in 1934. At the university he was a founder and chief of staff of Farrago, the student newspaper, and also a founder of the Melbourne University Labor Club.

From 1925 to 1935, he worked as a journalist in London, Sydney and Melbourne. He married Kathleen Fitzpatrick on 28 August 1932, but they separated in 1935.

In 1937, Fitzpatrick won the University of Melbourne's Harbison Higinbotham Scholarship with his manuscript of British imperialism and Australia 1783–1833; it was published by George Allen and Unwin in 1939. A sequel, The British Empire in Australia: An Economic History, 1834–1939, was published in 1941. A Short History of the Australian Labor Movement was published by Rawson's Bookshop, Melbourne in 1940 with a new enlarged edition in 1944. In 1940, Fitzpatrick was appointed a Research Fellow in the Department of History, University of Melbourne. He took leave during the war, working for the Commonwealth Rationing Commission and then the Department of War Organisation of Industry. He resumed his fellowship with the university in 1944 and remained there until 1947.

From 1947, Fitzpatrick returned to journalism editing The Australian Democrat, an independent non-party monthly news-review (1947–1950), and The Australian News-Review (1951–1953). During the 1940s, Fitzpatrick wrote a weekly column "Where do we go from here" in Smith's Weekly. He broadcast regularly from 3XY during the late 1940s and early 1950s. From 1955 until his death, he wrote a monthly article for The Rationalist. From 1958 also until his death in 1965, he published Brian Fitzpatrick's Labor Newsletter: What Is Going on in Australian politics. He did occasional work for the Australian Broadcasting Commission and the Australian Encyclopaedia.

Fitzpatrick's economic analyses were presented to the Commonwealth Court of Conciliation and Arbitration by the Australian Council of Trade Unions as part of its case in the Basic Wage Enquiry in 1940, and also to the Standard Hours Enquiry in 1949.

Fitzpatrick was a foundation member of the Australian Council for Civil Liberties in 1935. He was its general secretary from 1939 until his death in 1965. His children are Sheila Fitzpatrick, a historian of the Soviet Union, and David P. B. Fitzpatrick, a historian of Ireland.
