= Everyday Stalinism =

Book about Stalinist urbanization and industrialization in the 1930s

Everyday Stalinism: Ordinary Life in Extraordinary Times: Soviet Russia in the 1930s
- Author: Sheila Fitzpatrick
- Subject: Industrialization in the Soviet Union, Urbanization
- Genre: History
- Published: 1999 (hardcover), 2000 (paperback).
- Publisher: Oxford University Press
- Pages: 304 pp.
- ISBN: 978-0195050004
- Website: Oxford University Press Book page

Everyday Stalinism or Everyday Stalinism: Ordinary Life in Extraordinary Times: Soviet Russia in the 1930s is a book by Australian academic Sheila Fitzpatrick first published in 1999 by Oxford University Press and in paperback in 2000. Sheila Fitzpatrick is the Bernadotte E. Schmitt Distinguished Service Professor (Emeritus), Department of History, University of Chicago.

== Synopsis ==
Everyday Stalinism looks at the effects of urbanization and industrialization in the Soviet Union in the 1930s under Joseph Stalin. Focused on a history from below, Fitzpatrick records a history of impoverishment, overcrowding, and social destruction visited upon the average person. It records how ordinary citizens attempted to adapt when possible and circumvent when necessary the new way of life forced upon them by an omnipresent state bureaucracy backed up by a ruthless and brutal state secret police, and the waves of terror and turmoil it imposed on Soviet society. Fitzpatrick's 1994 work Stalin's Peasants looked at rural life in the Soviet Union in the 1930s during the period of Stalinist collectivization and the impact it had on the daily life of peasants. Everyday Stalinism completes the story by providing a look at urban life in the Soviet Union during the 1930s and the impact industrialization had on workers and their families and the shockwaves in urban centers created by the massive disruption collectivization caused in Soviet agriculture. Together the works form the story of the two sides of the devastating consequences of Stalinism had on the Soviet Union.

In Slavic Review, Lewis H. Siegelbaum (Michigan State University) writes:

Her range of sources is enormous. It includes, inter alia, advertisements, standard personnel questionnaires, movie scenes, and song lyrics. From these as well as diaries, memoirs, letters, newspaper articles, and travelers' accounts, she extracts telling details about the symbolic significance of uniforms and domestically produced champagne, markers of privilege such as chauffeur driven cars, dachas, and travel allowances, and the crucial role that patronage played in acquiring them. The types of individuals we meet along the way include not only the party elite, pampered Stakhanovites and intellectuals, but also conmen and domestic servants.

Fitzpatrick covers a broad range of topics to provide the reader with an understanding of how Stalinism impacted the lives of a wide variety of individuals in the Soviet Union. These include: the inner workings of the Communist party and the expectations placed on members; a contrast of the relative comfort in the lives of party members compared with the poverty and constant deprivations the average Soviet citizen faced; the omnipresent state propaganda of building a "radiant future"; the psychological impact of Stalinism on privileged insiders, the average individual, and those the party labeled as outsiders and enemies; the system of popular surveillance and denunciation, created and encouraged by the party to enforce communist ideology and practice; the experience of living through or dying in one of the greatest periods of oppression and mass murder in history. Some topics are covered lightly or excluded from Fitzpatrick's coverage of everyday life; the areas of work and occupations, education, and those of friendship and romance are examples. Regarding work and everyday life, Fitzpatrick states "I am interested in the experiences and practices that were common to the urban population as a whole, not just parts of it. This is why work, a part of everyday life that varies greatly from one occupational group to another, is not a central topic in this study." (Note: Fitzpatrick, 1999, pp.11.)

The contrast between the propaganda of abundance and the reality of want form the key theme of the first part of the book. From the start, building socialism in the Soviet Union theoretically meant creating a new classless egalitarian society that was able to produce an abundance of consumer goods as well as support robust industrial production. In reality, it produced a different, but even more rigid hierarchical society which was eventually even less able to support its citizens with consumer goods than what it replaced. The new hierarchy became the new class system and an individual's position within it and their relations to others determined their access to goods. Far from being a production-oriented society, the Stalinist Soviet Union became a prime example of a society forced to focus primarily on obtaining the necessities of life. Fitzpatrick documents the fantasy of the urban Potemkin village that the Soviet government attempted to portray, with the reality of rationing, rampant speculation, shops closed due to the lack of goods, and lengthy queues at those that were open, all of which formed the struggle average citizens faced trying to obtain the essentials of daily life. The strategies people used to survive and the system of blat, essentially the ability to access black markets and the underground economy, are shown to be the alternatives forced upon people to survive. This is all contrasted with the favoritism and relative abundance available to the Soviet elite and those they favored, completing a picture of the different castes within the supposedly classless society.

Writing in Social History, Sarah Davies states:

She shows how the chronic housing shortages of the 1930s gave rise to a number of practices, including fictive marriages, renting out corners of rooms, and continuing to live with spouses after a divorce. Because of the shortages of goods, both official and unofficial rationing were a constant feature of the decade. Speculation emerged as a way of coping with the inefficiencies of the official distribution system. The 'second economy' was a vital element of Stalinism. Blat (the use of contacts to exchange goods and services) was cultivated, and 'friends' became very important for survival. This was summed up pithily in a contemporary saying: 'One must have not 100 roubles, but a hundred friends.' ... In this society status mattered more than money. Like blat, patronage was ubiquitous, as people lower down the hierarchy relied on the support and protection of those higher up in order to obtain goods in short supply and to secure privileges.

Having set the stage and introduced the life of the average urban dweller, Fitzpatrick introduces more elements of urban life in the following chapters. Chapters include "Insulted and Injured" which deals with those individuals who were outcasts from Stalinist society and "Family Problems" where the author discusses how Soviet families were impacted by the economic upheaval, goods shortages, and the general social disruption that accompanied forced industrialization and urbanization. Finally the book concludes with chapters related to the Great Purges that occurred during 1937–38, the rise of surveillance by coworkers, friends, family, and the public at large, "denouncers" and "scapegoating" and the terror and uncertainty, not unlike the dekulakisation which occurred earlier in the countryside, that entered the lives of urban dwellers.

== Reception ==
In a 1999 review in Russian History, Oksana Fedotova wrote that "[t]his new book by Sheila Fitzpatrick is an outstanding contribution to the existing body of research into the Soviet past. Extensive use of archival material, combined with a wide range of published sources, and highlighted by references to the contemporary press cuttings, reveal an absorbing picture of everyday life under Stalinism. Against a rich variety of locations that stretched from workers' barracks and communal kitchens to the apartments of senior officials and closed access stores, there unfolds before our eyes an impressive array of characters. Bosses and outcasts, patrons and clients, activists and absconding husbands, elite wives and homeless children, are depicted in a multitude of activities and relationships that characterized the turbulent life of 1930s Russia."

Writing in the Journal of Modern History, Jeffrey J. Rossman stated that "[m]eticulously researched, imaginatively organized, and fluidly written, it deserves a wide audience." In The Slavonic and East European Review, Geoffrey Hosking wrote that "[a]nyone coming to this book from histories of everyday life as we are accustomed to them is in for a surprise. Far from being rigorously excluded, politics is in the driving seat. The first chapter concerns the authorities, in the form of the Soviet state and the Communist Party. They are present on virtually every page thereafter, too, and loom large in the conclusions. The attention devoted to politics is wholly appropriate, and it marks the final maturing of 'revisionist' social history as applied to the Soviet Union. Sheila Fitzpatrick has been a leader, in some respects the leader, of the movement, and over the years she has also led the way in 'bringing the state back in', acknowledging its omnipresence in all the activities and decisions of everyday life."

=== Academic journal reviews ===
- Brooke, Caroline (2003). "'May You Live in Interesting Times': Recent Literature on the Stalin Era". Contemporary European History. 12 (1): 119–127. doi:10.1017/S0960777303001073. JSTOR 20081144. S2CID 146741582.
- Davies, Sarah (2000). "Reviewed work: Everyday Stalinism: Ordinary Life in Extraordinary Times. Soviet Russia in the 1930s, Sheila Fitzpatrick". Social History. 25 (3): 383–385. JSTOR 4286702.
- Fedotova, Oksana (1999). "Reviewed work: Everyday Stalinism. Ordinary Life in Extraordinary Times: Soviet Russia in the 1930s, Sheila Fitzpatrick". Russian History. 26 (1): 104–105. JSTOR 24659264.
- Hosking, Geoffrey (2000). "Reviewed work: Everyday Stalinism: Ordinary Life in Extraordinary Times: Soviet Russia in the 1930s, Sheila Fitzpatrick". The Slavonic and East European Review. 78 (1): 161–163. JSTOR 4213028.
- Legvold, Robert (1999). "Reviewed work: Everyday Stalinism: Ordinary Life in Extraordinary Times: Soviet Russia in the 1930s, Sheila Fitzpatrick". Foreign Affairs. 78 (2): 152. JSTOR 20049248.
- Manning, Roberta T. (2000). "Reviewed work: Everyday Stalinism: Ordinary Life in Extraordinary Times; Soviet Russia in the 1930s, Sheila Fitzpatrick". The American Historical Review. 105 (5): 1839–1840. doi:10.2307/2652201. JSTOR 2652201.
- Moine, Nathalie (2001). "Reviewed work: Everyday Stalinism. Ordinary Life in Extraordinary Times: Soviet Russia in the 1930s, Sheila Fitzpatrick". Le Mouvement Social (196): 181–184. doi:10.2307/3779644. JSTOR 3779644.
- Rossman, Jeffrey J. (2001). "Everyday Stalinism. Ordinary Life in Extraordinary Times: Soviet Russia in the 1930s. By Sheila Fitzpatrick. New York: Oxford University Press, 1999. Pp. X+288. $27.50". The Journal of Modern History. 73 (3): 722–724. doi:10.1086/339084. JSTOR 10.1086/339084.
- Siegelbaum, Lewis H. (1999). "Reviewed work: Everyday Stalinism: Ordinary Life in Extraordinary Times: Soviet Russia in the 1930s, Sheila Fitzpatrick". Slavic Review. 58 (4): 921–922. doi:10.2307/2697237. JSTOR 2697237. S2CID 164549729.
- Tenner, Edward (1999). "Reviewed work: Everyday Stalinism: Ordinary Life in Extraordinary Times—Soviet Russia in the 1930s, Sheila Fitzpatrick". The Wilson Quarterly. 23 (3): 142. JSTOR 40259948.
- Walker, Barbara (2001). "(Still) Searching for a Soviet Society: Personalized Political and Economic Ties in Recent Soviet Historiography. A Review Article". Comparative Studies in Society and History. 43 (3): 631–642. doi:10.1017/S001041750100425X. JSTOR 2696684.
- Ward, Chris (2000). "Reviewed work: Everyday Stalinism: Ordinary Life in Extraordinary Times; Soviet Russia in the 1930s, Sheila Fitzpatrick". The Russian Review. 59 (2): 306–307. JSTOR 2679779.

== See also ==
- Joseph Stalin
- First five-year plan
- Urbanization
- Economy of the Soviet Union
- Stakhanovite movement
