= David P. B. Fitzpatrick =

Irish historian (1948–2019)

David Patrick Brian Fitzpatrick (25 May 1948 – 20 February 2019) was an Irish historian best known for his work on Irish independence and emigration. He was professor of Modern History at Trinity College Dublin and a member of the Royal Irish Academy.

Roy Foster referred to him as “the most original and influential Irish historian of his generation” and Diarmuid Ferriter considers him "one of the most brilliant historians of his generation." Cormac O Grada has stated he "will be remembered for his deep, sometimes contrarian, insights and for his takes on a bewilderingly wide range of themes."

== Early life ==
Fitzpatrick was born in Melbourne, Australia to Brian Charles Fitzpatrick, an author and journalist, and mother Dorothy Mary (née Davies), a historian at the Monash University. His elder sister Sheila Fitzpatrick is a historian of modern Russia. At birth, Fitzpatrick was given three names as their parents could not decide on either David, Brian or Patrick. To the family he was initially known as Pat, but he later took to using his first name.

His parents instilled in their children a strong sense of academic achievement. Two months before his Matriculation examinations, his father died during a research trip to Sydney. His parents were not separated as claimed elsewhere. Fitzpatrick nevertheless topped the State of Victoria in Modern History, adding an Exhibition to his other awards and scholarships. He went on to study history at the University of Melbourne and resided at Trinity College. His first foray into Irish history, through his love of the poetry of W. B. Yeats, was his B.A. Hons. thesis "The Dancer and the Dance: The Social and Political Ideas and Activities of William Butler Yeats from 1916 to 1928". Fitzpatrick graduated in 1969 before moving to La Trobe University as a tutor. After discussions there with the fellow Irish historian John O'Brien, he moved to do a PhD at Trinity College, Cambridge.

== Academic career ==
Fitzpatrick spent his professional life at Trinity College Dublin, where he was appointed a lecturer in Modern History in 1979. In 1982, he was made a Fellow, an Associate Professor 1993 and a Professor in 2000. Prior his move to Dublin, he spent time as a Prize Research Fellow between 1975 and 1977 at Nuffield College, Oxford, and returned to the University of Melbourne for two years as a research fellow (1977–1979). He published his first book, Politics and Irish Life, 1913–1921: Provincial Experience of War and Revolution in 1977. Based on his PhD thesis, the publication was described as "fair, balanced and neutral, with a touch of irreverence, indeed a model of objectivity."

== Personal life ==
Fitzpatrick was married twice. He first married Georgina Huege de Serville (known as Haigh), a historian who studied the Australian War Trials. They had a son, Brian, and daughter, Margaret. The marriage was dissolved in 1999. His second marriage was to Jane Leonard, an Irish military historian, with whom he had two daughters, Julia and Hannah. He died, aged 70, in Belfast after suffering a long illness.

== Bibliography ==
=== Monographs ===
- Politics and Irish Life, 1913–1921: Provincial Experience of War and Revolution (Gill & MacMillan, 1977)
- Irish Emigration, 1801–1921 (Economic and Social History Society of Ireland, 1984)
- Oceans of Consolation: Personal Accounts of Irish Migration to Australia (Cornell University Press, 1994)
- The Two Irelands, 1912–1939 (Oxford University Press, 1998)
- Harry Boland's Irish Revolution, 1887–1922 (Cork University Press, 2004)
- Solitary and Wild: Frederick MacNeice and the Salvation of Ireland (Lilliput Press, 2012)
- Descendancy: Irish Protestant Histories since 1795 (Cambridge University Press, 2017)
- Ernest Blythe in Ulster: The Making of a Double Agent? (Cork University Press, 2018)
- The Americanisation of Ireland: Migration and Settlement, 1841–1925 (Cambridge University Press, 2019)

=== Edited volumes ===
- Ireland and the First World War (Trinity History Workshop, 1986)
- Revolution?: Ireland, 1917–1923 (Trinity History Workshop, 1990)
- Henry Stratford Persse's Letters from Galway to America, 1821–1832 (Irish Narrative Series) (Cork University Press, 1998)
- Terror in Ireland, 1916–1923 (Trinity History Workshop, 2012)
