= Stalin's Peasants =

Book about Stalinist agricultural collectivization in the 1930s

Stalin's Peasants: Resistance and Survival in the Russian Village after Collectivization
- Author: Sheila Fitzpatrick
- Subject: Collectivization in the Soviet Union
- Genre: History
- Published: 1994
- Publisher: Oxford University Press
- Pages: 386 pp.
- ISBN: 978-0195069822
- Website: Oxford University Press Book page

Stalin's Peasants or Stalin's Peasants: Resistance and Survival in the Russian Village after Collectivization is a book by the Soviet scholar and historian Sheila Fitzpatrick first published in 1994 by Oxford University Press. It was released in 1996 in a paperback edition and reissued in 2006 by Oxford University Press. Sheila Fitzpatrick is the Bernadotte E. Schmitt Distinguished Service Professor (Emeritus), Department of History, University of Chicago.

== Summary ==
In a review in the journal Russian History, Stephan Merl summarizes the scope and contents of Stalin's Peasants:

The introductory chapter is on the village in the 1920s. It follows the story of the struggle for collectivization, causing the famine of 1932-33. The migration of peasants into towns before and after the introduction of the passport regime is treated, too, as well as the question of kolkhoz landholding and the advantages and disadvantages of membership in the kolkhozy. Another chapter is devoted to the internal organization of the kolkhoz—the work regime, payments, taxes and the private plots. There is a look at the people outside the kolkhozy. independent former peasants, "otkhodniks" working outside the kolkhozy, and craftsmen. Of special importance for the argument is the description of the local authorities, including the kolkhoz chairmen and the purges. Material on the religion of the kolkhoz peasants, their everyday life, the structure of families and the possibilities of education is presented. Crime and violence, village feuds and the crucial question of denunciations are the topics of another chapter. The question of the living standards and political activities of the peasants is raised, as well as the celebrity of the small group of successful stakhanovites and the procedure of election in the villages. The last chapter, already published separately, sheds light on rumors among the peasantry and on local show trials against kolkhoz chairmen in 1937-38.

== Synopsis ==
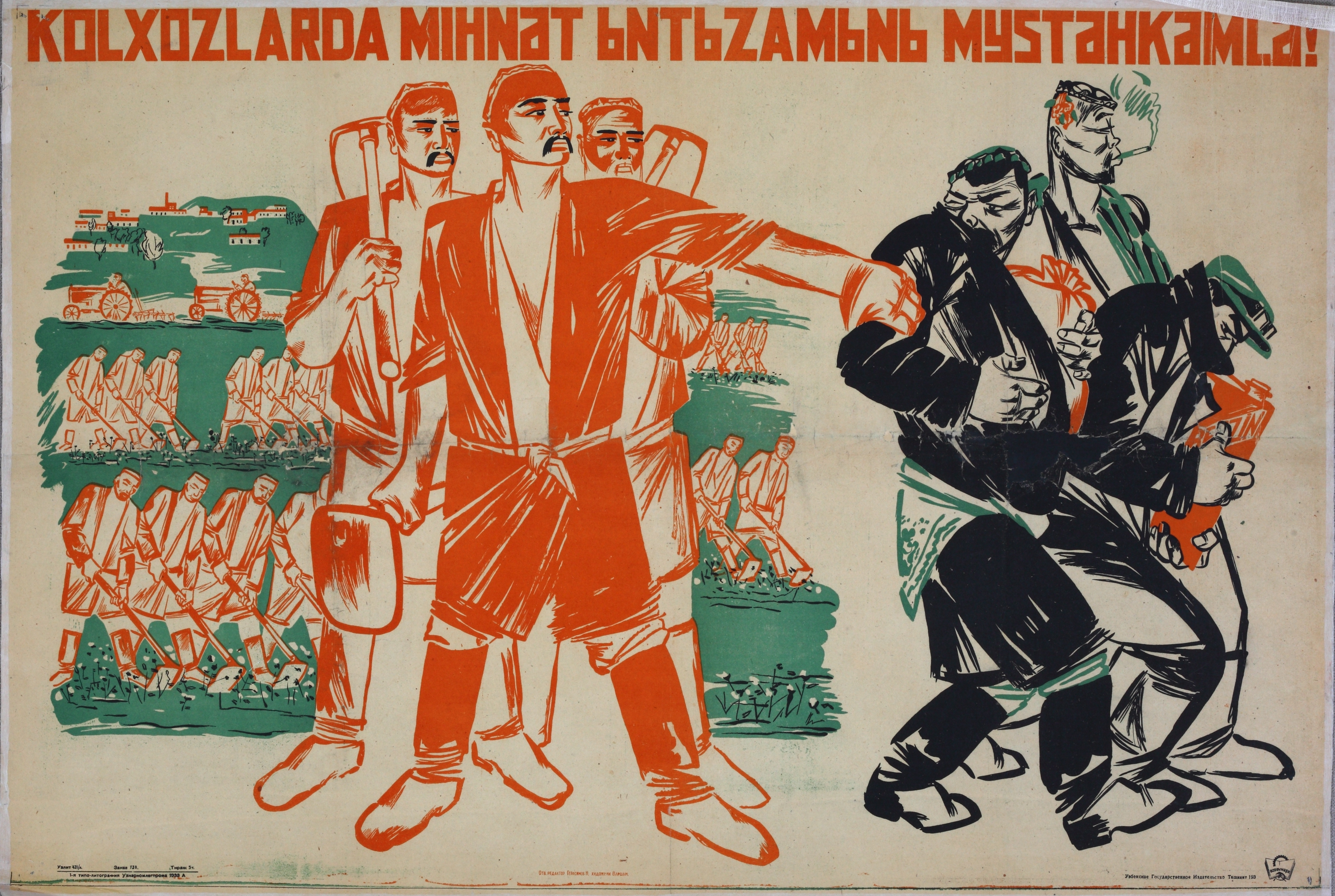
"Strengthen working discipline in collective farms", a Soviet propaganda poster from Uzbekistan, 1933

Stalin's Peasants is a history from below of the conflict between peasants and Stalinist leaders and apparatchiks during the period of collectivization in the Soviet Union during the 1930s. It attempts to understand the different ways Soviet peasants attempted to resist Joseph Stalin's policy of collectivization and their efforts to adapt and control their lives within the newly collectivized village. It also explores the impact collectivization had on relationships within and between villages, the conflicts it gave rise to, and the changes to the structure of local authority it engendered. The work shatters the myth of the happy peasants and the image of a Potemkin village of plenty, allegiance, and solidarity created by Soviet propagandists to justify collectivization and demonstrates how peasants understood this period as a "second serfdom". Based on evidence from the Soviet archives, it refutes the claim that the peasants saw Stalin as the "good Tsar" and shows that they understood he was responsible for the misery and famine they were experiencing.

Writing in Slavic Review, Robert E. Johnson states that "Sheila Fitzpatrick's book is not a general history of Soviet agriculture, or the Soviet peasantry or collectivization. (It will, indeed, be a challenging read for anyone who is not already familiar with these subjects.) Rather, she offers a thoughtful and provocative reappraisal of the collision between peasants and the Soviet state in the 1930s. Using a wide array of grass-roots sources, she examines the strategies of everyday survival, the limits of Soviet power, and the strains and divisions of life in the countryside."

Nellie Hauke Ohr writes in The Journal of Social History that "[t]he book builds on Fitzpatrick's work in Soviet social and cultural history, including her studies of the Commissariat of Enlightenment and the Cultural Revolution of 1928-1931 and, most recently, her collection of essays entitled The Cultural Front: Power and Culture in Revolutionary Russia."

Fitzpatrick is one of the first scholars to be able to explore this area of Soviet history with access to the Soviet archives which were opened during the period of glasnost during the Gorbachev era. Her work draws heavily on the police and government records and also the petitions and complaints sent to the Kremlin from Soviet peasants seeking relief from famine and redress for the oppression they were experiencing. Access to this enormous new trove of information proved to be both a blessing for the new information and perspectives it provided and a challenge for understanding, assimilating, and synthesizing the information into a meaningful and accurate revisionist history. (Note: The archives used in this book are from the Smolensk and Sverdlovsk regions.)

== Reception ==
Teodor Shanin writes in the American Historical Review that "this work marks a major step forward in the development of a rural history of Russia- a point from which to proceed."

Writing in Russian History, Stephen Merl states that "[i]n sum, we have to thank Fitzpatrick for a stimulating book that gives us a good impression of life in the kolkhozy. This is especially true for the attempt to challenge the traditional view of state-controlled kolkhozy. Fitzpatrick certainly is right in affirming that the kolkhozniks somewhat aligned themselves with the kolkhoz system by getting used to it and that, to a limited extent, they were successful in undermining state demands. However, there is still much work to be done in writing the social history of the peasants before coming to final and fully convincing conclusions. Fitzpatrick's book is an excellent starting point for further research."

=== Academic journal reviews ===
- Davies, R. W. (1996). Book Review. The English Historical Review, 111(444), pp. 1339-1341.
- Johnson, R. (1996). Book Review. Slavic Review, 55(1), pp. 186-187.
- Merl, S. (1995). Book Review. Russian History, 22(3), pp. 326-328.
- Ohr, N. (1995). Book Review. Journal of Social History, 28(4), pp. 935-937.
- Orlovsky, D. (1996). Book Review. International Labor and Working-Class History, (50), pp. 174-177.
- Richardson, W. (1994) Book Review. Reviews of New Books, 23(1), pp. 36-37.
- Shanin, T. (1996). Book Review. The American Historical Review, 101(4), pp. 1249-1250.
- Wehner, M. (1996). Book Review. Osteuropa, 46(4), pp. 412-414.
- Worobec, C. (1998). Book Review. The Journal of Modern History, 70(1), pp. 256-258.

== See also ==
- Agriculture in the Soviet Union
- Holodomor
- Human rights in the Soviet Union
- Political repression in the Soviet Union
- Population transfer in the Soviet Union
- Soviet famine of 1932–33
