= Shami =

Shami may refer to:

== Regions ==
- Damascus, also known as Shami
- Bilad al-Sham
- Syria

== People ==
=== Religious groups ===
- Shami Jews, Jews from Damascus
- Yemenite Jews, some of them also called Shami Jews

==== Individuals with the nickname ====
- Shami-Damulla (died 1932), figure in the development of Islamic fundamentalism in Soviet Central Asia

==== Individuals with the given name ====
- Shami Abdulahi (born 1984), Ethiopian long-distance runner
- Shami Chakrabarti (born 1960), British lawyer and politician
- Shami Hassan (born 1984), Qatari footballer
- Shami Kermashani (1927–1984), Iranian Kurdish poet

==== Individuals with the surname ====
- Abdullah Al Shami (born 1994), Syrian footballer
- Abu Ishaq Shami (died 940), Muslim scholar
- Ali Al Shami (born 1945), Lebanese academic and politician
- Basim Shami (born 1976), Palestinian-American businessman and philanthropist
- Farouk Shami, Palestinian-American businessman
- Mohammed Shami (born 1990), Indian cricketer
- Mubarak Hassan Shami (born 1980), Kenyan-Qatari long-distance runner
- Mujeeb-ur-Rehman Shami, Pakistani journalist and columnist
- Yitzhaq Shami (1888–1949), Palestinian Jewish writer

== Other uses ==
- Shamī: a village in Khuzestan province of Iran
- Shami, another name for Levantine Arabic
- Shami, Shemi or Shimi: a village in Semnan province of Iran
- Shami goat or Damascus goat, a goat breed
- Shami Hospital, a hospital in Damascus, Syria
- Shami kebab, a type of kebab from the Indian subcontinent
- Shami or Prosopis cineraria, the state tree of Rajasthan, India
- Shami Statue or Statue, National Museum of Iran 2401, a statue found in Shami, Khuzestan, Iran
- Shami-Amourae, a demon lord in the Dungeons & Dragons role-playing game

== See also ==
- Shammi (disambiguation)
