= History of the Soviet Union =

The history of the Soviet Union (USSR) (1922–1991) began with the ideals of the Russian Bolshevik Revolution and ended in dissolution amidst economic collapse and political disintegration. Established in 1922 following the Russian Civil War, the Soviet Union quickly became a one-party state under the Communist Party. Its early years under Lenin were marked by the implementation of socialist policies and the New Economic Policy (NEP), which allowed for market-oriented reforms.

The rise of Joseph Stalin in the late 1920s ushered in an era of intense centralization and totalitarianism. Stalin's rule was characterized by the forced collectivization of agriculture, rapid industrialization, and the Great Purge, which eliminated perceived enemies of the state. The Soviet Union, one of the Big Four Allied powers alongside the United States, the United Kingdom, and China, played a crucial role in the Allied victory in World War II, but at a tremendous human cost, with millions of Soviet citizens perishing in the conflict.

The Soviet Union emerged as one of the world's two superpowers, leading the Eastern Bloc in opposition to the Western Bloc led by the United States during the Cold War. This period saw the USSR engage in an arms race, the Space Race, and proxy wars around the globe. The post-Stalin leadership, particularly under Nikita Khrushchev, initiated a de-Stalinization process, leading to a period of liberalization and relative openness known as the Khrushchev Thaw. However, the subsequent era under Leonid Brezhnev, referred to as the Era of Stagnation, was marked by economic decline, political corruption, and a rigid gerontocracy. Despite efforts to maintain the Soviet Union's superpower status, the economy struggled due to its centralized nature, technological backwardness, and inefficiencies. The vast military expenditures and burdens of maintaining the Eastern Bloc, further strained the Soviet economy.

In the 1980s, Mikhail Gorbachev's policies of glasnost ('openness') and perestroika ('restructuring') aimed to revitalize the Soviet system but instead accelerated its unraveling. Nationalist movements gained momentum across the Soviet republics, and the control of the Communist Party weakened. The failed coup attempt in August 1991 against Gorbachev by hardline communists hastened the collapse of the Soviet Union, which formally dissolved on December 26, 1991, ending nearly seven decades of Soviet rule. It was legally inherited by the Russian Federation. The legacy of the Soviet Union is complex, leaving behind significant industrial achievements, military prowess, cultural influence, and an impact on global politics, but also a record of repression, economic inefficiencies, and the suppression of political and personal freedoms.

== Establishment (1917–1927) ==
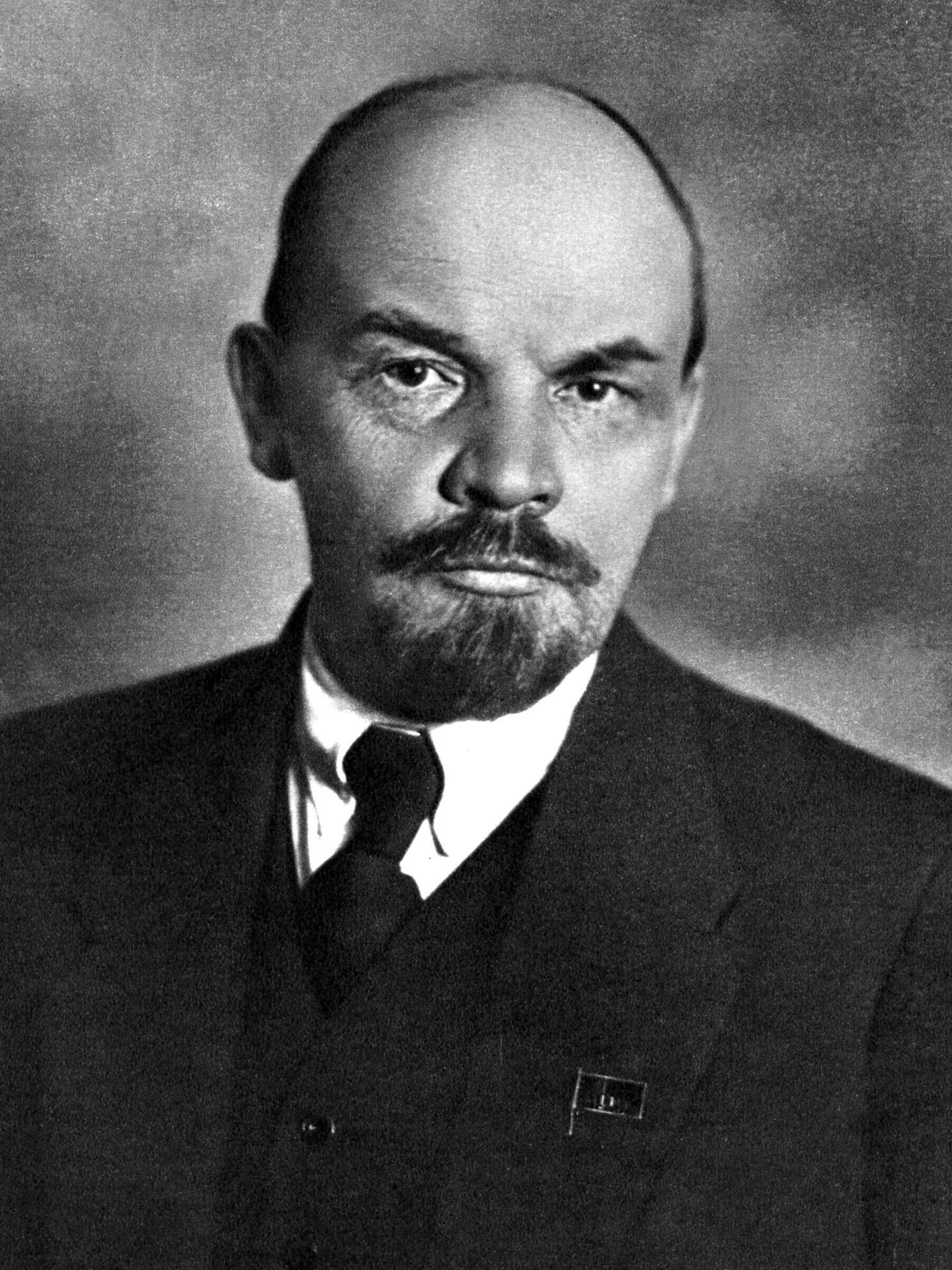
Vladimir Lenin, founder of the Soviet Union and the leader of the Bolshevik party.

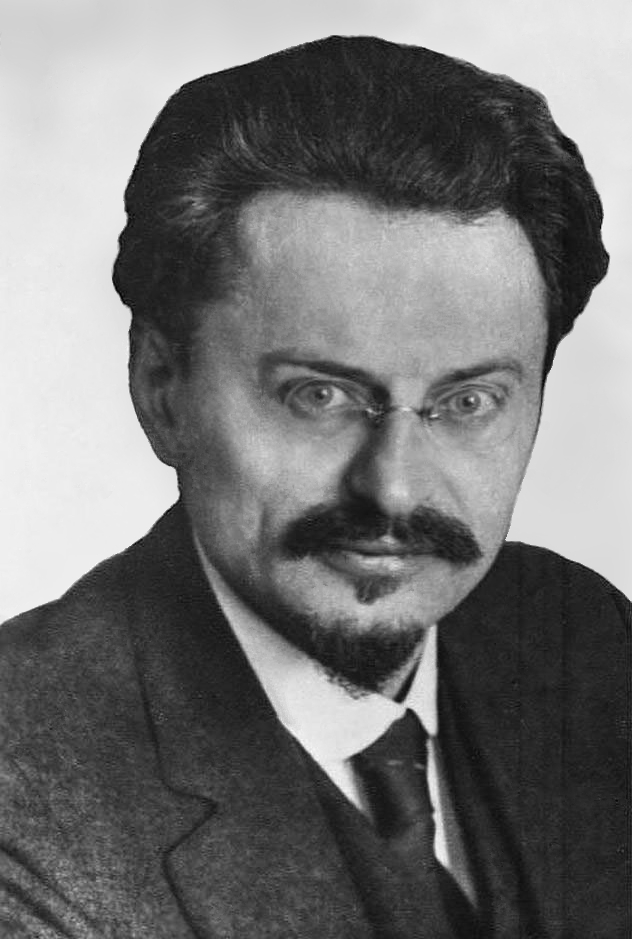
Leon Trotsky, founder of the Red Army and a key figure in the October Revolution.

The revolutionary activity in the Russian Empire dates back to the 1905 Russian Revolution. A parliament, the State Duma, was established in 1906 after the Russian Revolution of 1905, but Emperor Nicholas II resisted attempts to move from absolute to a constitutional monarchy. Social unrest continued and was aggravated during World War I by military defeat and food shortages in major cities.

A spontaneous popular demonstration in Petrograd on 8 March 1917, demanding peace and bread, culminated in the February Revolution and the abdication of Nicholas II and the imperial government. The tsarist autocracy was replaced by the social-democratic Russian Provisional Government, which intended to conduct elections to the Russian Constituent Assembly and to continue fighting on the side of the Entente in World War I. At the same time, workers' councils, known in Russian as 'Soviets', sprang up across the country, and the most influential of them, the Petrograd Soviet of Workers' and Soldiers' Deputies, shared power with the Provisional Government. Membership of the Bolshevik party had risen from 24,000 members in February 1917 to 200,000 members by September 1917. 50,000 workers had passed a resolution in favour of the Bolshevik demand for the transfer of power to the Soviets.

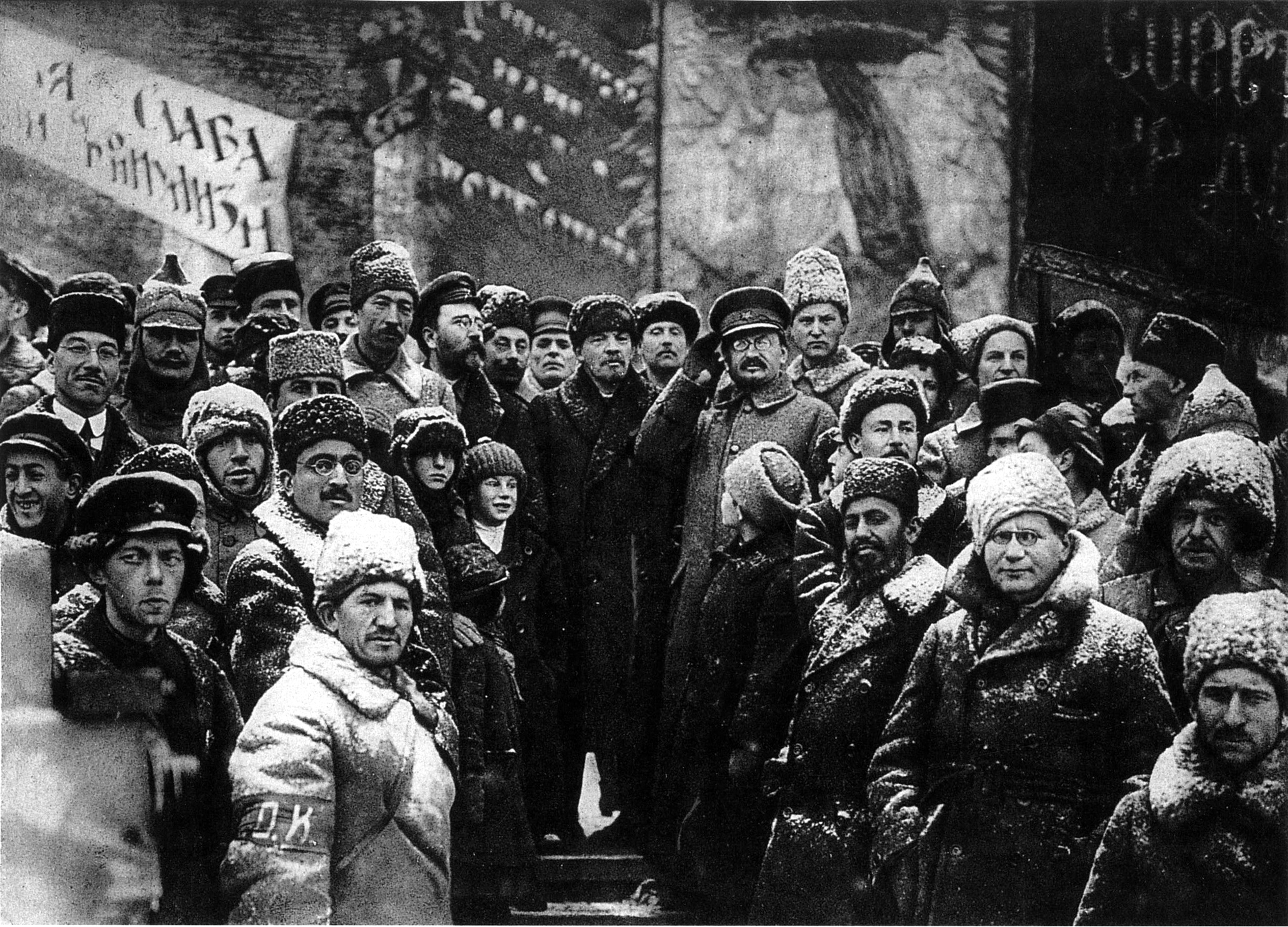
Lenin, Trotsky, and Kamenev celebrating the second anniversary of the October Revolution

The Bolsheviks, led by Vladimir Lenin, pushed for communist revolution in the Soviets and on the streets, adopting the slogan of "All Power to the Soviets" and urging the overthrow of the Provisional Government. On 7 November 1917, Bolshevik Red Guards stormed the Winter Palace in Petrograd, arresting the Provisional Government leaders and Lenin declared that all power was now transferred to the Soviets. This event would later be officially known in Soviet bibliographies as the "Great October Socialist Revolution". Bolshevik figures such as Anatoly Lunacharsky, Moisei Uritsky, and Dmitry Manuilsky agreed that Lenin's influence on the Bolshevik party was decisive but the October insurrection was carried out according to Trotsky's, not to Lenin's plan. The initial stage of the October Revolution which involved the assault on Petrograd occurred largely without any human casualties.

Lenin's government instituted a number of progressive measures such as universal education, universal healthcare, and equal rights for women. Conversely, the bloody Red Terror was initiated to shut down all opposition, both perceived and real. The terror also arose in response to a number of assassination attempts on Bolshevik senior leaders and organized insurrections against the Soviet government.

The federalization of Russia was promulgated in the Declaration of the Rights of the Peoples of Russia in November, not including the detached borderlands. In December, the Bolsheviks signed an armistice with the Central Powers, though by February 1918, fighting had resumed. In March, the Soviets ended their involvement in the war and signed a separate peace treaty, the Treaty of Brest-Litovsk. After the defeat of the Germans in the war, Lenin sought the creation of formally independent Soviet republics in the territories that were being vacated by the German Army.

A long and bloody civil war ensued between the Reds and the Whites, ending in 1921–1922 with the Reds' victory. It included foreign intervention, the murder of the former emperor and his family, and the famine of 1921–1922, which killed about five million people. Although Lenin had declared his support for the principle of self-determination, the party became centralized and the independent Soviet republics were subordinated to Soviet Russia. In March 1921, the Treaty of Riga was signed with the Republic of Poland, splitting territories in Belarus and Ukraine, and putting an end to Lenin's westward offensive against capitalism. In Estonia, Finland, Latvia, and Lithuania, the Reds were defeated, while the Red Army managed to occupy Armenia, Azerbaijan, and Georgia in the Caucasus. Additionally, the forced requisition of food by the Soviet government led to substantial resistance, of which the most notable was the Tambov Rebellion, ultimately put down by the Red Army.

Russian Civil War in the European part of Russia

The civil war had a devastating impact on the economy. A black market emerged in Russia, despite the threat of martial law against profiteering. The ruble collapsed, with barter increasingly replacing money as a medium of exchange and, by 1921, heavy industry output had fallen to 20% of 1913 levels. 90% of wages were paid with goods rather than money. 70% of locomotives were in need of repair, and food requisitioning, combined with the effects of seven years of war and a severe drought, contributed to a famine that caused between 3 and 10 million deaths. Coal production decreased from 27.5 million tons (1913) to 7 million tons (1920), while overall factory production also declined from 10,000 million roubles to 1,000 million roubles. According to the noted historian David Christian, the grain harvest was also slashed from 80.1 million tons (1913) to 46.5 million tons (1920).

=== Treaty on the Creation of the USSR ===
On 28 December 1922, a conference of plenipotentiary delegations from the Russian SFSR, the Transcaucasian SFSR, the Ukrainian SSR, and the Byelorussian SSR approved the Treaty on the Creation of the USSR and the Declaration of the Creation of the USSR, forming the Union of Soviet Socialist Republics. These two documents were confirmed by the first Congress of Soviets of the USSR and signed by the heads of the delegations, Mikhail Kalinin, Mikhail Tskhakaya, Mikhail Frunze, Grigory Petrovsky, and Alexander Chervyakov, on 30 December 1922. The formal proclamation was made from the stage of the Bolshoi Theatre in Moscow.

An intensive restructuring of the economy, industry, and politics of the country began in the early days of Soviet power in 1917. A large part of this was done according to the Bolshevik Initial Decrees, government documents signed by Vladimir Lenin. One of the most prominent breakthroughs was the GOELRO plan, which envisioned a major restructuring of the Soviet economy based on total electrification of Russia. The plan became the prototype for subsequent Five-Year Plans and was fulfilled by 1931. After the economic policy of 'War communism' during the Russian Civil War, as a prelude to fully developing socialism in the country, the Soviet government permitted some private enterprise to coexist alongside nationalized industry with the New Economic Policy in 1921, and total food requisition in the countryside was replaced by a food tax.

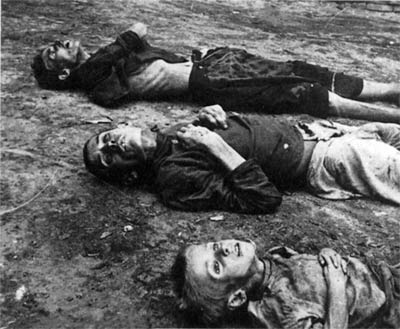
The Russian famine of 1921–22 killed an estimated 5 million people.

From its creation, the government in the Soviet Union was based on the one-party rule of the Communist Party (Bolsheviks). (Note: The consolidation into a one-party state took place during the first three and a half years after the revolution, which included the period of War communism and an election in which multiple parties competed. See Schapiro, Leonard (1955). The Origin of the Communist Autocracy: Political Opposition in the Soviet State, First Phase 1917–1922. Cambridge, Massachusetts: Harvard University Press.) The stated purpose was to prevent the return of capitalist exploitation, and that the principles of democratic centralism would be the most effective in representing the people's will in a practical manner. The debate over the future of the economy provided the background for a power struggle in the years after Lenin's death in 1924. Initially, Lenin was to be replaced by a 'troika' consisting of Grigory Zinoviev of the Ukrainian SSR, Lev Kamenev, of the Russian SFSR, and Joseph Stalin, of the Transcaucasian SFSR.

In February 1924, the USSR was recognized by the United Kingdom. The same year, a Soviet Constitution was approved, legitimizing the December 1922 union.

According to Archie Brown the constitution was never an accurate guide to political reality in the USSR. For example, the fact that the Party played the leading role in making and enforcing policy was not mentioned in it until 1977. The USSR was a federative entity of many constituent republics, each with its own political and administrative entities. However, the term 'Soviet Russia' – formally applicable only to the Russian Federative Socialist Republic – was often applied to the entire country by non-Soviet writers due to its domination by the Russian SFSR.

== Stalinism (1927–1953) ==
On 3 April 1922, Stalin was named the General Secretary of the Communist Party of the Soviet Union. Lenin had appointed Stalin the head of the Workers' and Peasants' Inspectorate, which gave Stalin considerable power. By gradually consolidating his influence and isolating and outmaneuvering his rivals within the party, Stalin became the undisputed leader of the country and, by the end of the 1920s, established a totalitarian rule. In October 1927, Grigory Zinoviev and Leon Trotsky were expelled from the Central Committee and forced into exile.

In 1928, Stalin introduced the first five-year plan for building a socialist economy. In place of the internationalism expressed by Lenin throughout the revolution, it aimed to build Socialism in One Country. In industry, the state assumed control over all existing enterprises and undertook an intensive program of industrialization. In agriculture, rather than adhering to the 'lead by example' policy advocated by Lenin, forced collectivization of farms was implemented all over the country.

Famines ensued as a result, causing deaths estimated at three to seven million; surviving kulaks (wealthy or middle-class peasants) were persecuted, and many were sent to Gulags to do forced labor. Social upheaval continued in the mid-1930s. Despite the turmoil of the mid-to-late 1930s, the country developed a robust industrial economy in the years preceding World War II.

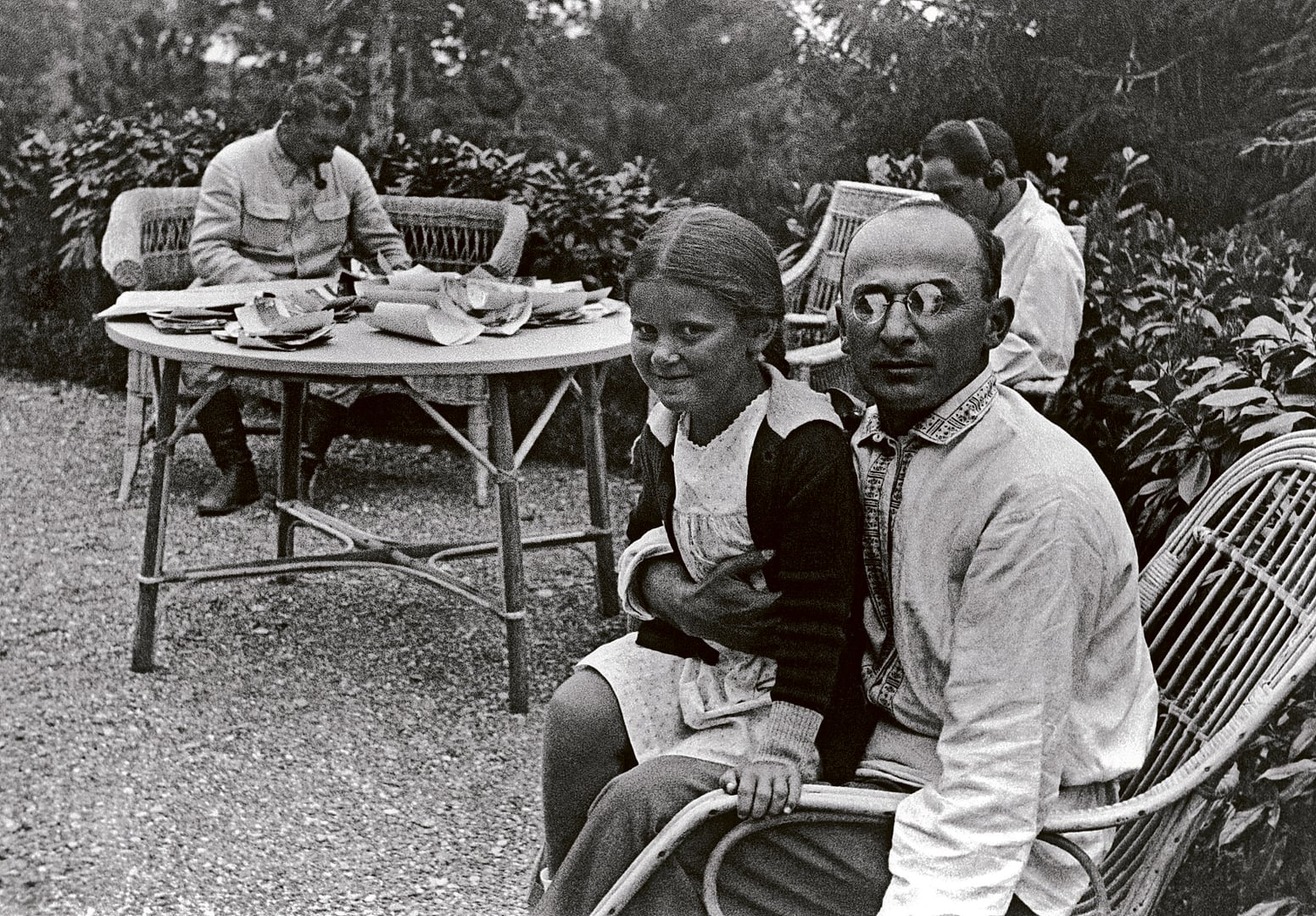
Stalin and Lavrentiy Beria with Stalin's daughter, Svetlana, on his lap. As head of the NKVD, Beria was responsible for many political repressions in the Soviet Union.

Closer cooperation between the USSR and the West developed in the early 1930s. From 1932 to 1934, the country participated in the World Disarmament Conference. In 1933, diplomatic relations between the United States and the USSR were established when in November, the newly elected President of the United States, Franklin D. Roosevelt, chose to recognize Stalin's Communist government formally and negotiated a new trade agreement between the two countries. In September 1934, the country joined the League of Nations. After the Spanish Civil War broke out in 1936, the USSR actively supported the Republican forces against the Nationalists, who were supported by Fascist Italy and Nazi Germany.

In December 1936, Stalin unveiled a new constitution that was praised by supporters around the world as the most democratic constitution imaginable, though there was some skepticism. American historian J. Arch Getty concludes: "Many who lauded Stalin's Soviet Union as the most democratic country on earth lived to regret their words. After all, the Soviet Constitution of 1936 was adopted on the eve of the Great Terror of the late 1930s; the "thoroughly democratic" elections to the first Supreme Soviet permitted only uncontested candidates and took place at the height of the savage violence in 1937. The civil rights, personal freedoms, and democratic forms promised in the Stalin constitution were trampled almost immediately and remained dead letters until long after Stalin's death."

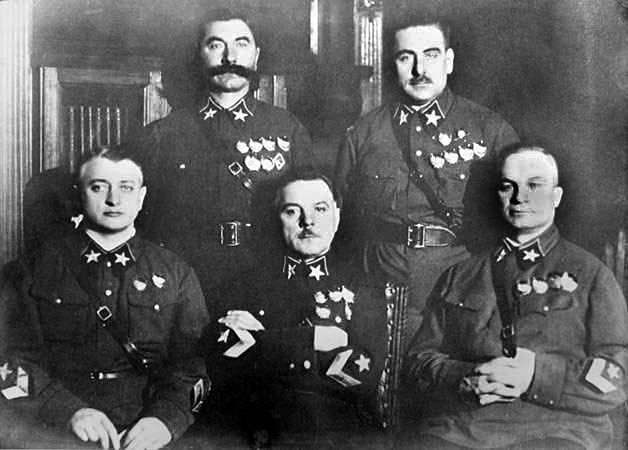
Five Marshals of the Soviet Union in 1935. Only two of them—Budyonny and Voroshilov—survived the Great Purge. Blyukher, Yegorov and Tukhachevsky were executed.

Stalin's Great Purge resulted in the detainment or execution of many 'Old Bolsheviks' who had participated in the October Revolution. According to declassified Soviet archives, the NKVD arrested more than one and a half million people in 1937 and 1938, of whom 681,692 were shot. Over those two years, there were an average of over one thousand executions a day. (Note: According to British historian Geoffrey Hosking, "excess deaths during the 1930s as a whole were in the range of 10–11 million." American historian Timothy D. Snyder claims that archival evidence suggests maximum excess mortality of nine million during the entire Stalin era. Australian historian and archival researcher Stephen G. Wheatcroft asserts that around a million "purposive killings" can be attributed to the Stalinist regime, along with the premature deaths of roughly two million more amongst the repressed populations (i.e. in camps, prisons, exiles, etc.) through criminal negligence.) Scholars estimate the total death toll for the Great Purge (1936–1938), including fatalities attributed to prison conditions, to be roughly 700,000-1.2 million.

In 1939, after attempts to form a military alliance with Britain and France against Germany failed, the Soviet Union made a dramatic shift towards Nazi Germany. Almost a year after Britain and France had concluded the Munich Agreement with Germany, the Soviet Union made agreements with Germany as well, both militarily and economically during extensive talks. Unlike the case of Britain and France, the Soviet Union's agreement with Germany, the Molotov–Ribbentrop Pact (signed on 23 August 1939), included a secret protocol that paved the way for the Soviet invasion of Eastern European states and occupation of their territories. The pact made possible the Soviet occupation of Lithuania, Latvia, Estonia, Bessarabia, northern Bukovina, and eastern Poland.

In the far east, the Soviet military won several decisive victories during border clashes with the Empire of Japan in 1938 and 1939. However, in April 1941, the USSR signed the Soviet–Japanese Neutrality Pact with Japan, which the Soviets would unilaterally break in 1945, recognizing the territorial integrity of Manchukuo, a Japanese puppet state. The pact ensured Japan would not enter the World War II against the USSR on the side of Germany later.

=== World War II ===
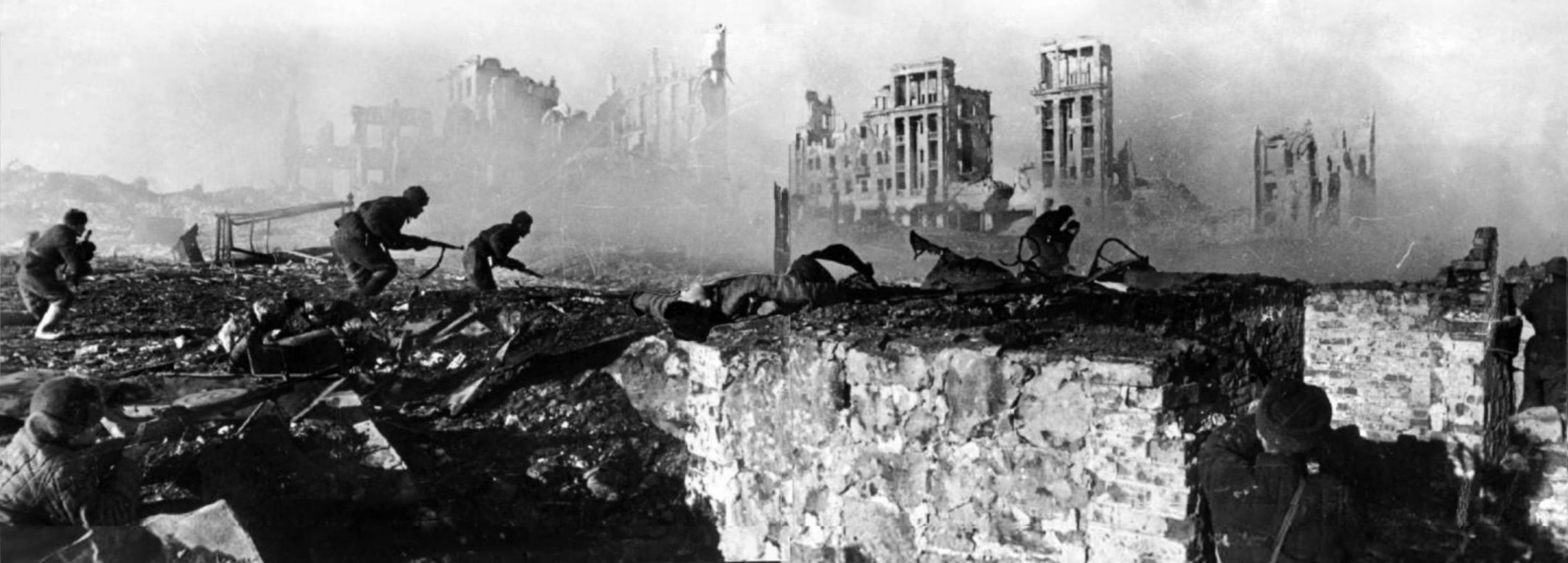
The Battle of Stalingrad, considered by many historians as a decisive turning point of World War II

On 1 September, Germany invaded Poland and on the 17th the Soviet Union invaded Poland as well. On 6 October, Poland fell and part of the Soviet occupation zone was then handed over to Germany. On 10 October, the Soviet Union and Lithuania signed an agreement whereby the Soviet Union transferred Polish sovereignty over the Vilna region to Lithuania, and on 28 October the boundary between the Soviet occupation zone and the new territory of Lithuania was officially demarcated. On 1 November, the Soviet Union annexed Western Ukraine, followed by Western Belarus on the 2nd. In late November, unable to coerce the Republic of Finland by diplomatic means into moving its border 25 kilometres (16 mi) back from Leningrad, Stalin ordered the invasion of Finland. On 14 December 1939, the Soviet Union was expelled from the League of Nations for invading Finland.

Germany broke the Molotov–Ribbentrop Pact and invaded the Soviet Union on 22 June 1941 starting what is known in Russia and some other post-Soviet states as the Great Patriotic War. The Red Army stopped the seemingly invincible German Army at the Battle of Moscow. The Battle of Stalingrad, which lasted from late 1942 to early 1943, dealt a severe blow to Germany from which they never fully recovered and became a turning point in the war. After Stalingrad, Soviet forces drove through Eastern Europe to Berlin before Germany surrendered in 1945. The German Army suffered 80% of its military deaths in the Eastern Front. Harry Hopkins, a close foreign policy advisor to Franklin D. Roosevelt, spoke on 10 August 1943 of the USSR's decisive role in the war, saying that "While in Sicily the forces of Great Britain and the United States are being opposed by 2 German divisions, the Russian front is receiving attention of approximately 200 German divisions." (Note: "In War II Russia occupies a dominant position and is the decisive factor looking toward the defeat of the Axis in Europe. While in Sicily the forces of Great Britain and the United States are being opposed by 2 German divisions, the Russian front is receiving attention of approximately 200 German divisions. Whenever the Allies open a second front on the Continent, it will be decidedly a secondary front to that of Russia; theirs will continue to be the main effort. Without Russia in the war, the Axis cannot be defeated in Europe, and the position of the United Nations becomes precarious. Similarly, Russia's post-war position in Europe will be a dominant one. With Germany crushed, there is no power in Europe to oppose her tremendous military forces.") Up to 34 million soldiers served in the Red Army during World War II, 8 million of which were non-Slavic minorities.

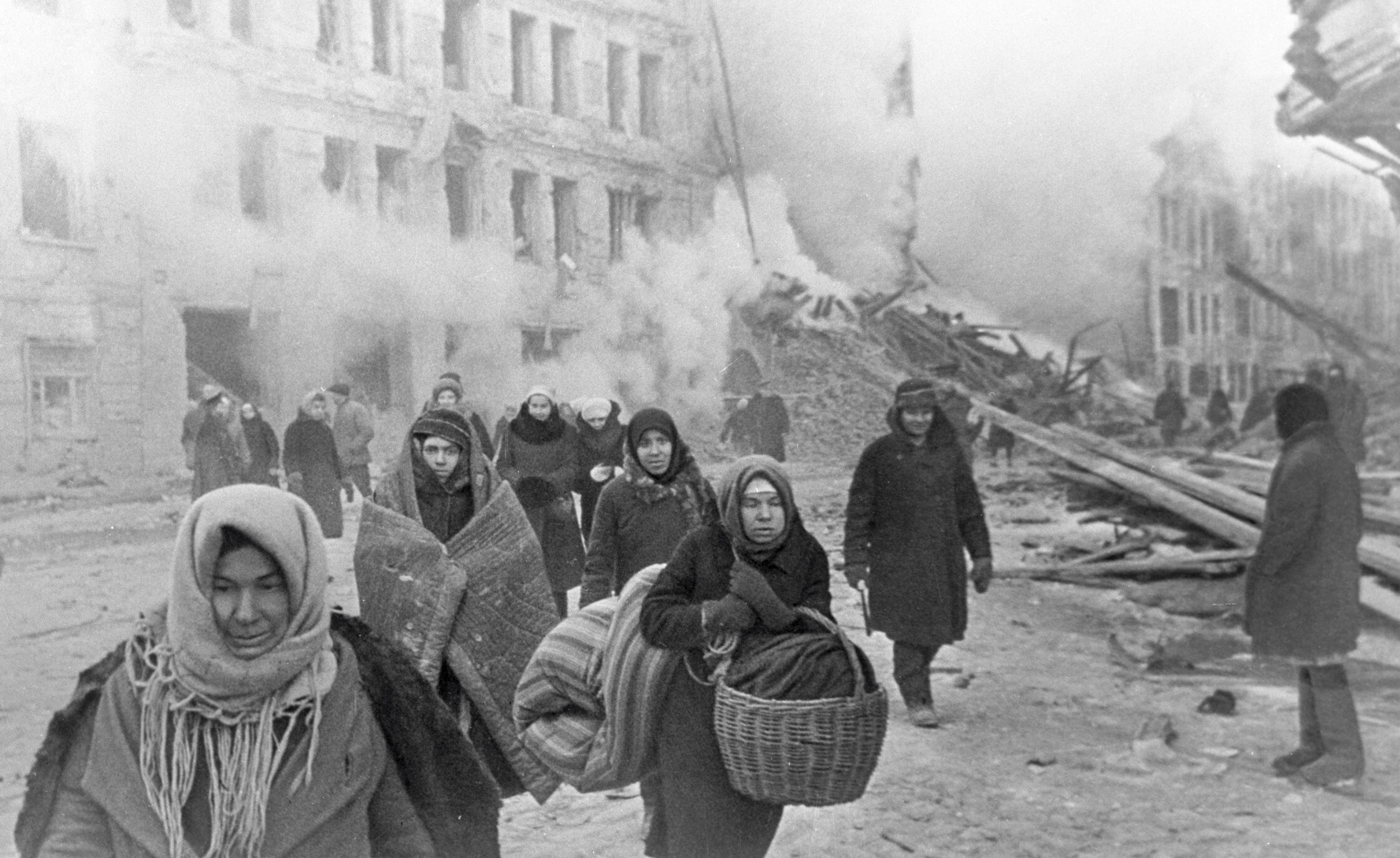
Residents of Leningrad leave their homes destroyed by German bombing. About 1 million civilians died during the 871-day Siege of Leningrad, mostly from starvation.

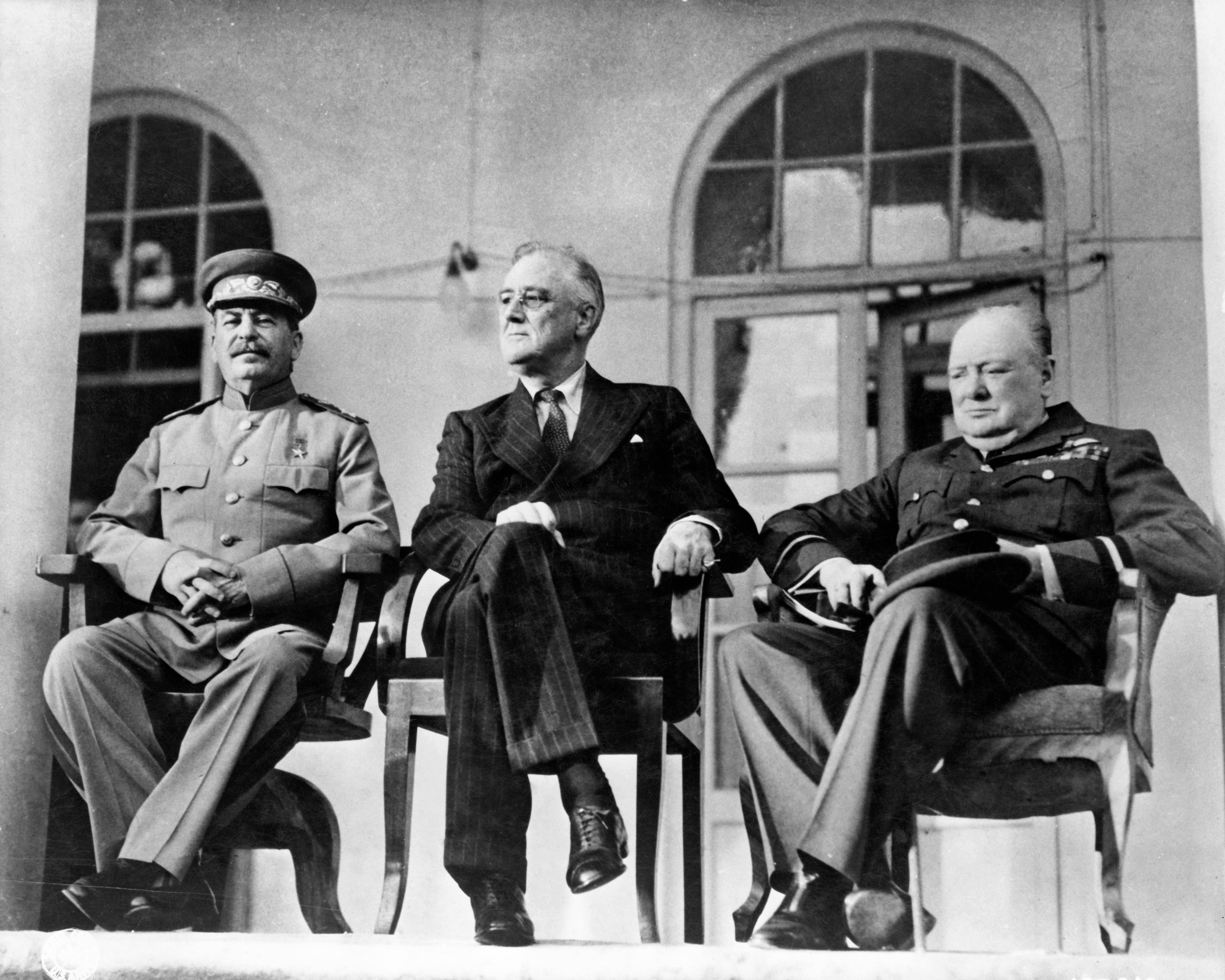
From left to right, the Soviet General Secretary Joseph Stalin, US President Franklin D. Roosevelt and British Prime Minister Winston Churchill confer in Tehran, 1943

The USSR suffered greatly in the war, losing around 20 million people (modern Russian sources put the number at 26.6 million). This includes 8.7 million military deaths. The majority of the losses were ethnic Russians, followed by ethnic Ukrainians. Approximately 2.8 million Soviet POWs died of starvation, mistreatment, or executions in just eight months of 1941–42. More than 2 million people were killed in Belarus during the three years of German occupation, almost a quarter of the region's population, including around 550,000 Jews in the Holocaust in Belarus. During the war, the country together with the United States, the United Kingdom and China were considered the Big Four Allied powers, and later became the Four Policemen that formed the basis of the United Nations Security Council. It emerged as a superpower in the post-war period. Once denied diplomatic recognition by the Western world, the USSR had official relations with practically every country by the late 1940s. A member of the United Nations at its foundation in 1945, the country became one of the five permanent members of the United Nations Security Council, which gave it the right to veto any of its resolutions.

The USSR, in fulfillment of its agreement with the Allies at the Yalta Conference, broke the Soviet–Japanese Neutrality Pact in April 1945 which Japan had been honoring despite their alliance with Germany, and invaded Manchukuo and other Japan-controlled territories on 9 August 1945. This conflict ended with a decisive Soviet victory, contributing to the unconditional surrender of Japan and the end of World War II.

Soviet soldiers committed mass rapes in occupied territories, especially in Germany. The wartime rapes were followed by decades of silence. According to historian Antony Beevor, whose books were banned in 2015 from some Russian schools and colleges, NKVD (Soviet secret police) files have revealed that the leadership knew what was happening, but did little to stop it. It was often rear echelon units who committed the rapes. According to professor Oleg Rzheshevsky, "4,148 Red Army officers and many privates were punished for committing atrocities". The exact number of German women and girls raped by Soviet troops during the war and occupation is uncertain, but historians estimate their numbers are likely in the hundreds of thousands, and possibly as many as two million.

The Soviet Union was greatly assisted in its wartime effort by the United States via Lend-Lease. In total, the U.S. deliveries to the USSR through Lend-Lease amounted to $11 billion in materials: over 400,000 jeeps and trucks; 12,000 armored vehicles (including 7,000 tanks, about 1,386 of which were M3 Lees and 4,102 M4 Shermans); 11,400 aircraft (of which 4,719 were Bell P-39 Airacobras, 3,414 were Douglas A-20 Havocs and 2,397 were Bell P-63 Kingcobras) and 1.75 million tons of food. As Soviet soldiers were bearing the brunt of the war, Roosevelt's advisor Harry Hopkins felt that American aid to the Soviets would hasten the war's conclusion.

Roughly 17.5 million tons of military equipment, vehicles, industrial supplies, and food were shipped from the Western Hemisphere to the USSR, 94% coming from the US. For comparison, a total of 22 million tons landed in Europe to supply American forces from January 1942 to May 1945. It has been estimated that American deliveries to the USSR through the Persian Corridor alone were sufficient, by US Army standards, to maintain sixty combat divisions in the line.

=== Cold War ===
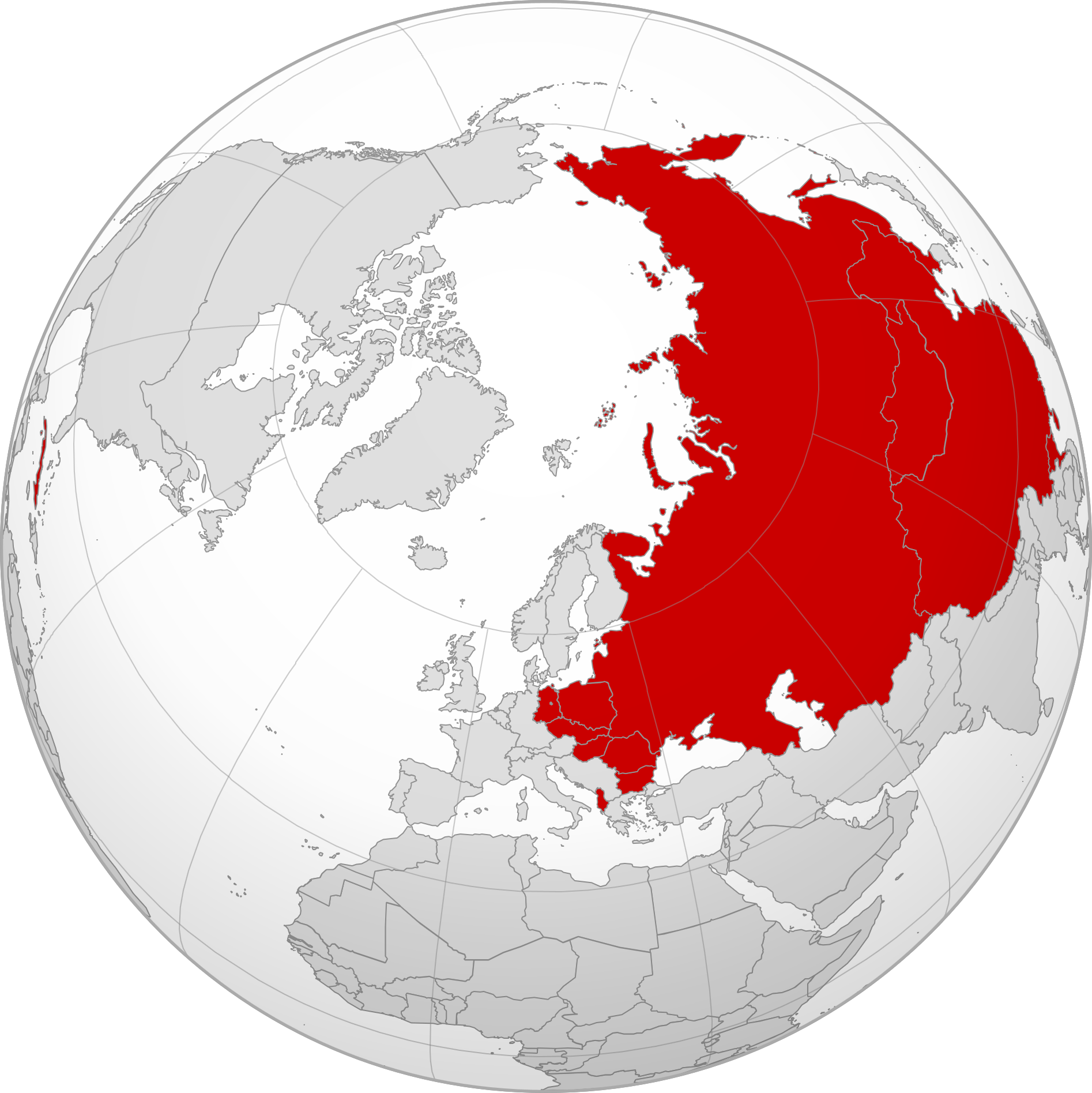
Map showing the greatest territorial extent of the Soviet Union and the sovereign states that it dominated politically, economically and militarily in 1960, after the Cuban Revolution of 1959 but before the official Sino-Soviet split of 1961 (total area: c. 35,000,000 km^{2}) (Note: 34,374,483 km^{2})

During the immediate post-war period, the Soviet Union rebuilt and expanded its economy, while maintaining its strictly centralized control. It took effective control over most of the countries of Eastern Europe (except Yugoslavia and later Albania), turning them into satellite states. The USSR bound its satellite states in a military alliance, the Warsaw Pact, in 1955, and an economic organization, Council for Mutual Economic Assistance or Comecon, a counterpart to the European Economic Community (EEC), from 1949 to 1991. Although nominally a "defensive" alliance, the Warsaw Pact's primary function was to safeguard the Soviet Union's hegemony over its Eastern European satellites, with the Pact's only direct military actions having been the invasions of its own member states to keep them from breaking away. The USSR concentrated on its own recovery, seizing and transferring most of Germany's industrial plants, and it exacted war reparations from East Germany, Hungary, Romania, and Bulgaria using Soviet-dominated joint enterprises. It also instituted trading arrangements deliberately designed to favour the country. Moscow controlled the Communist parties that ruled the satellite states, and they followed orders from the Kremlin. Historian Mark Kramer concludes:

"The net outflow of resources from eastern Europe to the Soviet Union was approximately $15 billion to $20 billion in the first decade after World War II, an amount roughly equal to the total aid provided by the United States to western Europe under the Marshall Plan."

Later, the Comecon supplied aid to the eventually victorious Chinese Communist Party, and its influence grew elsewhere in the world. Fearing its ambitions, the Soviet Union's wartime allies, the United Kingdom and the United States, became its enemies. In the ensuing Cold War, the two sides clashed indirectly in proxy wars.

== Khrushchev Thaw (1953–1964) ==
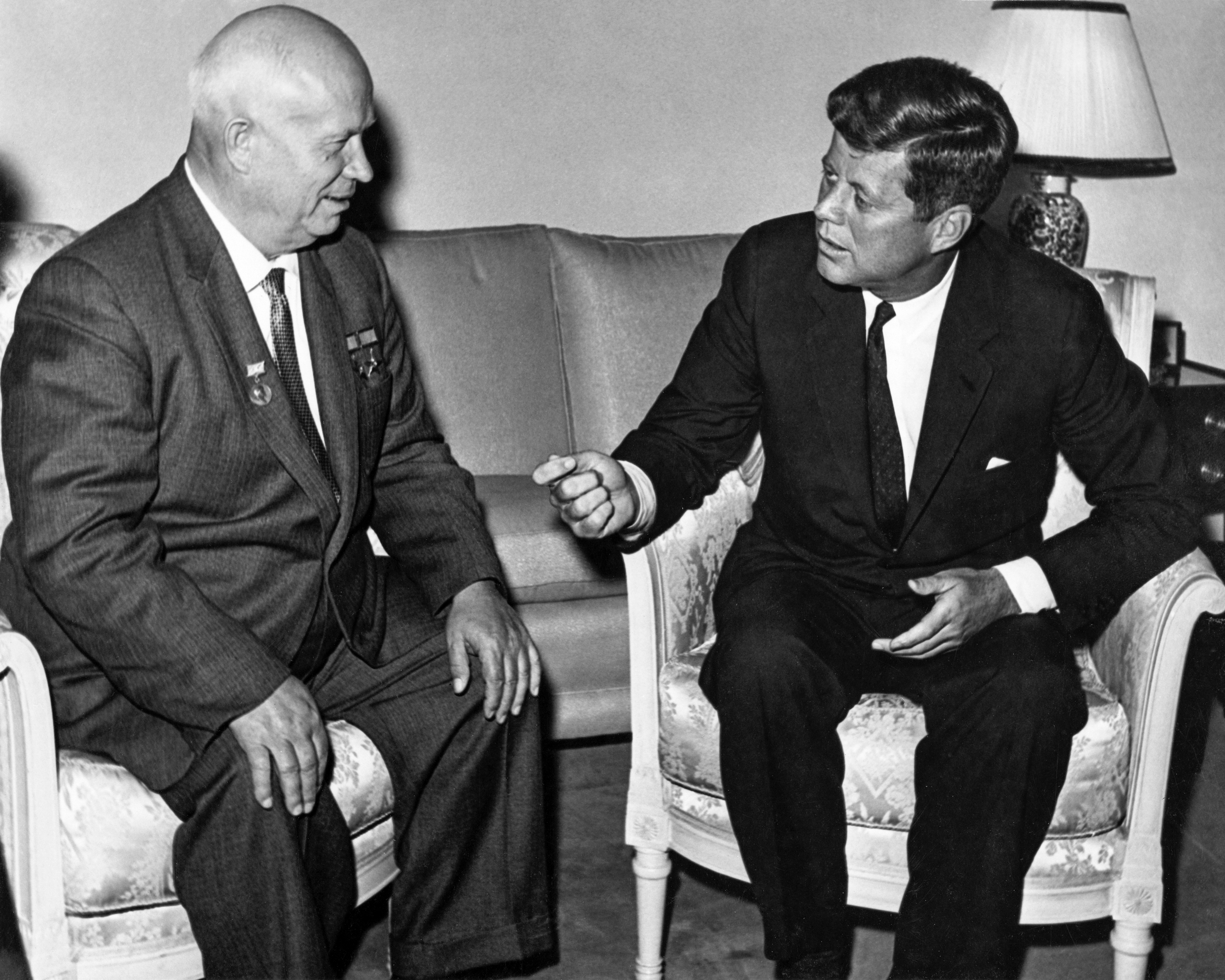
Soviet leader Nikita Khrushchev (left) with US President John F. Kennedy in Vienna, 3 June 1961

Stalin died on 5 March 1953. Without a mutually agreeable successor, the highest Communist Party officials initially opted to rule the Soviet Union jointly through a troika headed by Georgy Malenkov. This did not last, however, and Nikita Khrushchev eventually won the ensuing power struggle by the mid-1950s. In 1956, he denounced Joseph Stalin and proceeded to ease controls over the party and society. This was known as de-Stalinization.

Moscow considered Eastern Europe to be a critically vital buffer zone for the forward defence of its western borders, in case of another major invasion such as the German invasion of 1941. For this reason, the USSR sought to cement its control of the region by transforming the Eastern European countries into satellite states, dependent upon and subservient to its leadership. As a result, Soviet military forces were used to suppress an anti-communist uprising in Hungary in 1956.

In the late 1950s, a confrontation with China regarding the Soviet rapprochement with the West, and what Mao Zedong perceived as Khrushchev's revisionism, led to the Sino–Soviet split. This resulted in a break throughout the global Marxist–Leninist movement, with the governments in Albania, Cambodia, and Somalia choosing to ally with China.

During this period of the late 1950s and early 1960s, the USSR continued to realize scientific and technological exploits in the Space Race, rivaling the United States: launching the first artificial satellite, Sputnik 1 in 1957; a living dog named Laika in 1957; the first human being, Yuri Gagarin in 1961; the first woman in space, Valentina Tereshkova in 1963; Alexei Leonov, the first person to walk in space in 1965; the first soft landing on the Moon by spacecraft Luna 9 in 1966; and the first Moon rovers, Lunokhod 1 and Lunokhod 2.

Khrushchev initiated 'The Thaw', a complex shift in political, cultural, and economic life in the country. This included some openness and contact with other nations and new social and economic policies with more emphasis on commodity goods, allowing a dramatic rise in living standards while maintaining high levels of economic growth. Censorship was relaxed as well. Khrushchev's reforms in agriculture and administration, however, were generally unproductive. In 1962, he precipitated a crisis with the United States over the Soviet deployment of nuclear missiles in Cuba. An agreement was made with the United States to remove nuclear missiles from both Cuba and Turkey, concluding the crisis. This event caused Khrushchev much embarrassment and loss of prestige, resulting in his removal from power in 1964.

== Era of Stagnation (1964–1982) ==
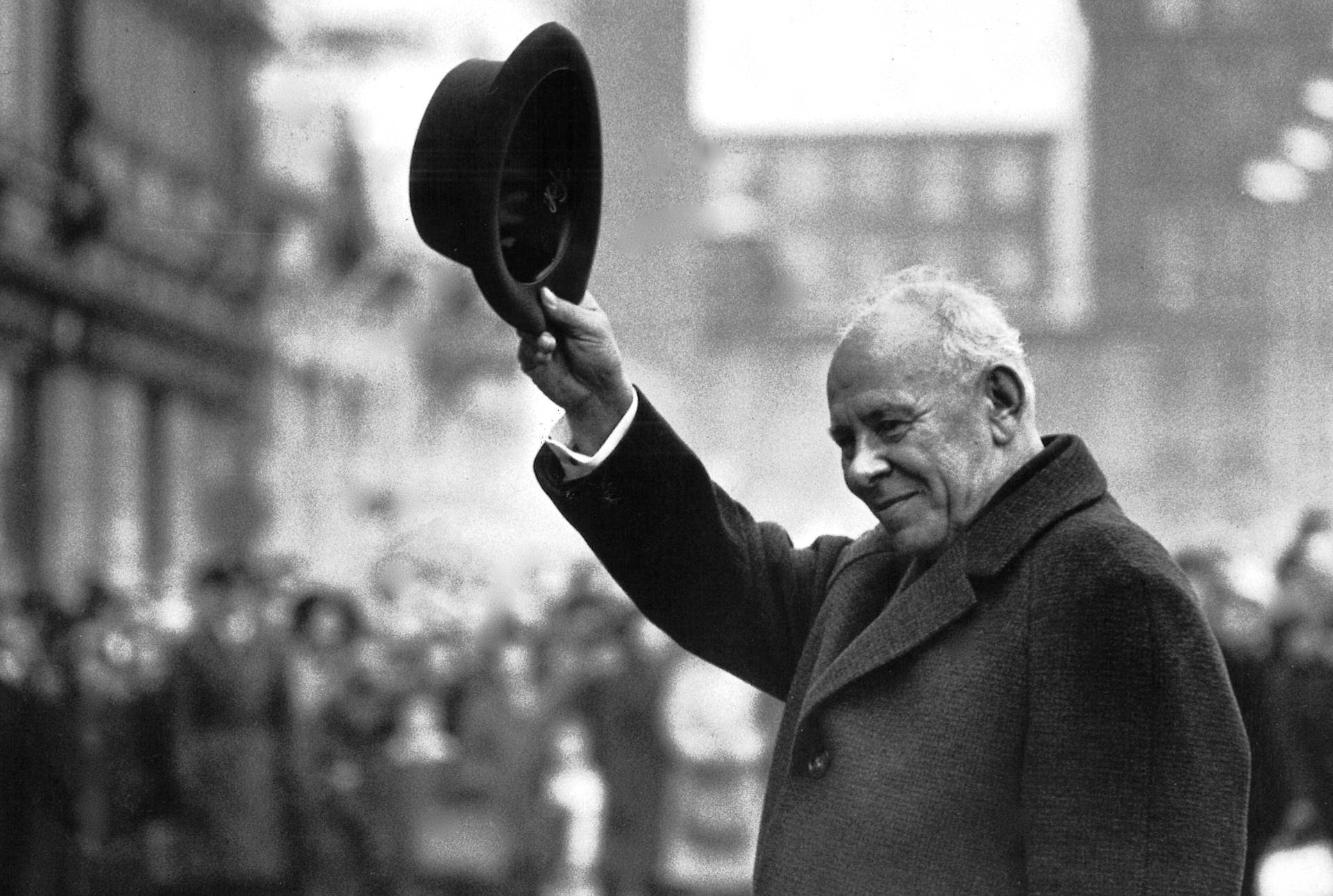
Nikolai Podgorny visiting Tampere, Finland on 16 October 1969

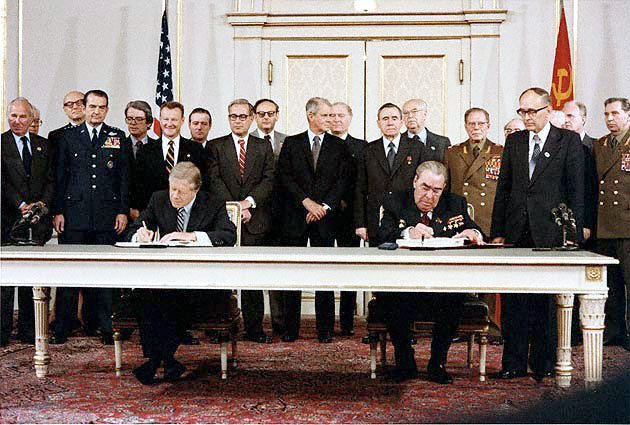
Soviet general secretary Leonid Brezhnev and US President Jimmy Carter sign the SALT II arms limitation treaty in Vienna on 18 June 1979.

The "Brezhnev Era" (from 1964 to 1982) covers the period of Leonid Brezhnev's rule of the Union of Soviet Socialist Republics (USSR). This period began with high economic growth and soaring prosperity but ended with a much weaker Soviet Union facing social, political, and economic stagnation. The average annual income stagnated because needed economic reforms were never fully carried out.

Following the ousting of Nikita Khrushchev on 14 October 1964, Brezhnev replaced him as First Secretary, and Alexei Kosygin took over as Chairman of the Council of Ministers. Anastas Mikoyan, and later Nikolai Podgorny, became Chairmen of the Presidium of the Supreme Soviet. Alongside Andrei Kirilenko as organisational secretary, and Mikhail Suslov as chief ideologue, this group formed a reinvigorated collective leadership, which contrasted in form with the autocracy that characterized Khrushchev's rule.

The collective leadership initially focused on stabilizing the Soviet Union and calming Soviet society. They also sought to accelerate economic growth, which had slowed considerably during Khrushchev's final years in power. In 1965, Kosygin initiated several economic reforms aimed at decentralizing the Soviet economy. These reforms initially spurred economic growth, but hard-liners within the Party halted them, fearing that they would undermine the Party's prestige and power. As a result, no further radical economic reforms were implemented during the Brezhnev era, leading to economic stagnation by the early-to-mid-1970s. By Brezhnev's death in 1982, Soviet economic growth had nearly come to a standstill.

During this period, Brezhnev consolidated power, and by the early 1970s, he had established himself as the preeminent Soviet leader. The stabilization policy established a ruling gerontocracy, and political corruption became increasingly prevalent. Despite this, Brezhnev never launched any large-scale anti-corruption campaigns. The Soviet Union, thanks to the military buildup of the 1960s, solidified its status as a superpower during Brezhnev's rule. However, this era was also marked by the Era of Stagnation, a period characterized by economic, political, and social decline, which persisted under Brezhnev's successors, Yuri Andropov and Konstantin Chernenko.

Nevertheless, the standard of living of the population continued to rise steadily during the Brezhnev era. Soviet citizens gradually gained access to consumer goods that had previously been uncommon—cars, refrigerators, and television sets. Wage levels and the quality of housing increased, while the state guaranteed education, medical care, housing, and paid vacations for all. Most families also enjoyed free access to childcare facilities and extracurricular activities. Full employment, disability insurance (non-contributory and generous), and the lowering of the full retirement age (55 for women and 60 for men) allowed the population to look to the future with confidence.

The Brezhnev Era also witnessed significant international actions, including the 1968 Warsaw Pact invasion of Czechoslovakia to suppress the Prague Spring reforms. Brezhnev justified this and future interventions with the Brezhnev Doctrine, which stated that any threat to Soviet rule in a Warsaw Pact state was a threat to all Warsaw Pact states, thus justifying military intervention.

Brezhnev presided over a period of détente with the West, leading to treaties on arms control such as SALT I, SALT II, and the Anti-Ballistic Missile Treaty, while simultaneously building up Soviet military might. In 1977, the third Soviet Constitution was unanimously adopted. One of the Soviet economy's key strengths during this period was its vast oil and gas reserves. The quadrupling of world oil prices during the 1973 oil crisis and another rise in the late 1970s made the energy sector the chief driver of the Soviet economy. This revenue was used to offset multiple economic weaknesses. Former Soviet Premier Alexei Kosygin once remarked that "things are bad with bread. Give me 3 million tons [of oil] over the plan." The revenue from oil exports helped to mitigate a growing food supply crisis, fund the import of equipment and consumer goods, and sustain the arms race with the US. It also underpinned risky foreign policy actions, such as the Soviet–Afghan War beginning in 1979, which effectively ended the period of détente with the West.

The long period of Brezhnev's rule culminated in his death on 10 November 1982. By this time, the Soviet Union had become increasingly stagnant, with an ageing leadership resistant to change and a deteriorating economy. Moreover, the Soviet Union's failure to modernize its economy, particularly in the field of computerization, further hindered its competitiveness with Western powers.

== Reforms and dissolution (1982–1991) ==
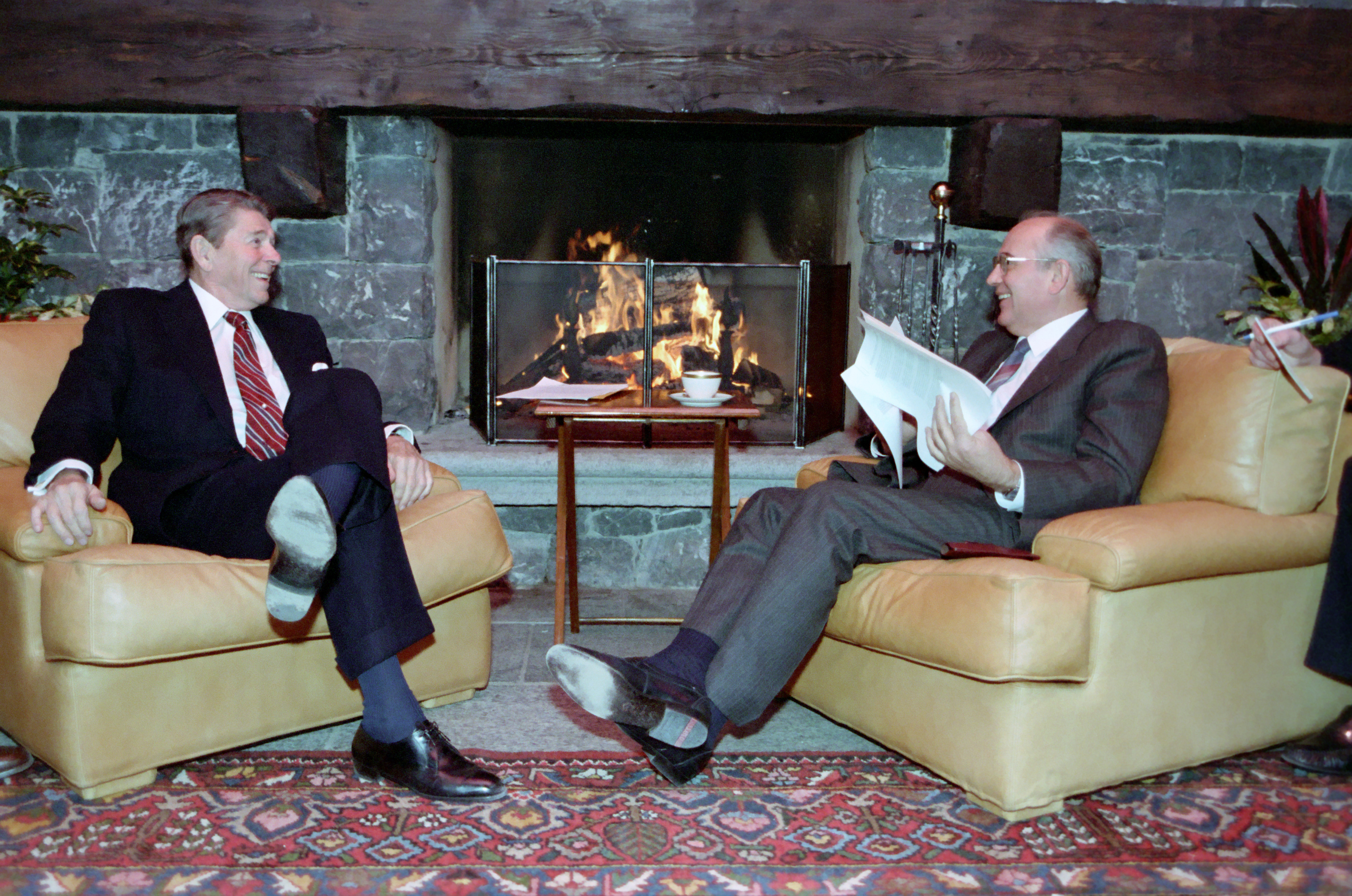
Mikhail Gorbachev in one-to-one discussions with US President Ronald Reagan (left), 1985

Two developments dominated the decade that followed: the increasingly apparent crumbling of the Soviet Union's economic and political structures, and the patchwork attempts at reforms to reverse that process. Kenneth S. Deffeyes argued that the Reagan administration encouraged Saudi Arabia to lower the price of oil to the point where the Soviets could not make a profit selling their oil, and resulted in the depletion of the country's hard currency reserves.

Brezhnev's next two successors, transitional figures with deep roots in his tradition, did not last long. Yuri Andropov was 68 years old and Konstantin Chernenko 72 when they assumed power; both died in less than two years. In an attempt to avoid a third short-lived leader, in 1985, the Soviets turned to the next generation and selected Mikhail Gorbachev. In addition to the failing economy, the prolonged war in Afghanistan led to increased public dissatisfaction with the Communist government.

In the 26 April 1986 Chernobyl disaster in Pripyat, Ukraine, one of the plant's nuclear reactors exploded, spreading radioactive contaminants across Europe and forcing tens of thousands of people to permanently evacuate from a 30 km exclusion zone. At least two dozen people died from being at the plant and many more died from radiation exposure.

The Chernobyl disaster added motive force to Gorbachev's reforms. He made significant changes in the economy and party leadership, called perestroika. His policy of glasnost freed public access to information after decades of heavy government censorship. Gorbachev also moved to end the Cold War. In 1988, the USSR abandoned its war in Afghanistan and began to withdraw its forces. In the following year, Gorbachev refused to interfere in the internal affairs of the Soviet satellite states, which paved the way for the Revolutions of 1989. In particular, the standstill of the Soviet Union at the Pan-European Picnic in August 1989 then set a peaceful chain reaction in motion, at the end of which the Eastern Bloc collapsed. With the tearing down of the Berlin Wall and with East and West Germany pursuing re-unification, the Iron Curtain between the West and Soviet-occupied regions came down.

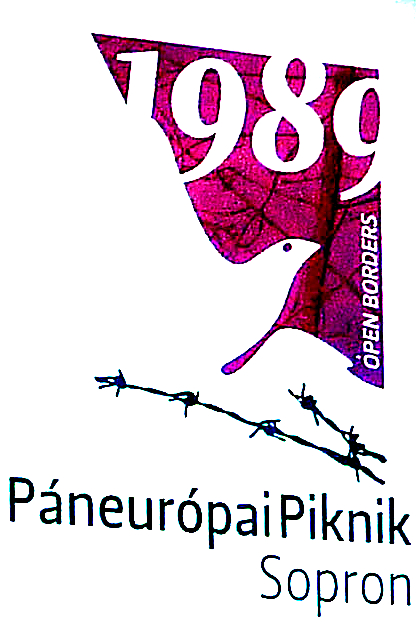
The Pan-European Picnic took place in August 1989 on the Hungarian-Austrian border.

At the same time, the Soviet republics started legal moves towards potentially declaring sovereignty over their territories, citing the freedom to secede in Article 72 of the USSR constitution. On 7 April 1990, a law was passed allowing a republic to secede if more than two-thirds of its residents voted for it in a referendum. Many held their first free elections in the Soviet era for their own national legislatures in 1990. Many of these legislatures proceeded to produce legislation contradicting the Union laws in what was known as the 'War of Laws'. In 1989, the Russian SFSR convened a newly elected Congress of People's Deputies. Boris Yeltsin was elected its chairman. On 12 June 1990, the Congress declared Russia's sovereignty over its territory and proceeded to pass laws that attempted to supersede some of the Soviet laws. After a landslide victory of Sąjūdis in Lithuania, that country declared its independence restored on 11 March 1990, citing the illegality of the Soviet occupation of the Baltic states. Soviet forces attempted to halt the secession by crushing popular demonstrations in Lithuania (Bloody Sunday) and Latvia (The Barricades), as a result of which numerous civilians were killed or wounded. However, these actions only bolstered international support for the secessionists.

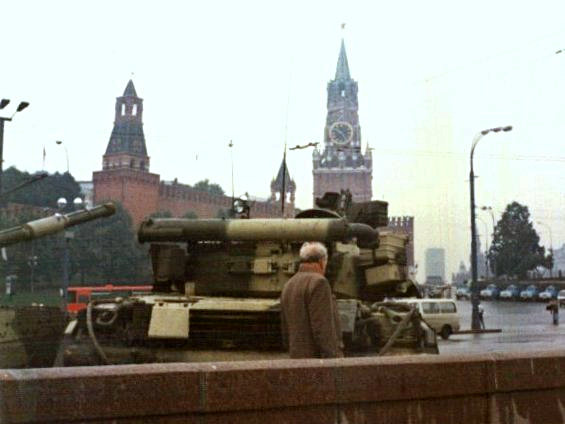
T-80 tank on Red Square during the August Coup

A referendum for the preservation of the USSR was held on 17 March 1991 in nine republics (the remainder having boycotted the vote), with the majority of the population in those republics voting for preservation of the Union in the form of a new federation. The referendum gave Gorbachev a minor boost. In the summer of 1991, the New Union Treaty, which would have turned the country into a much looser Union, was agreed upon by eight republics. The signing of the treaty, however, was interrupted by the August Coup—an attempted coup d'état by hardline members of the government and the KGB who sought to reverse Gorbachev's reforms and reassert the central government's control over the republics. After the coup collapsed, Russian president Yeltsin was seen as a hero for his decisive actions, while Gorbachev's power was effectively ended. The balance of power tipped significantly towards the republics. In August 1991, Latvia and Estonia immediately declared the restoration of their full independence (following Lithuania's 1990 example). Gorbachev resigned as general secretary in late August, and soon afterwards, the party's activities were indefinitely suspended—effectively ending its rule. By the fall, Gorbachev could no longer influence events outside Moscow, and he was being challenged even there by Yeltsin, who had been elected President of Russia in July 1991.

== Dissolution and aftermath ==
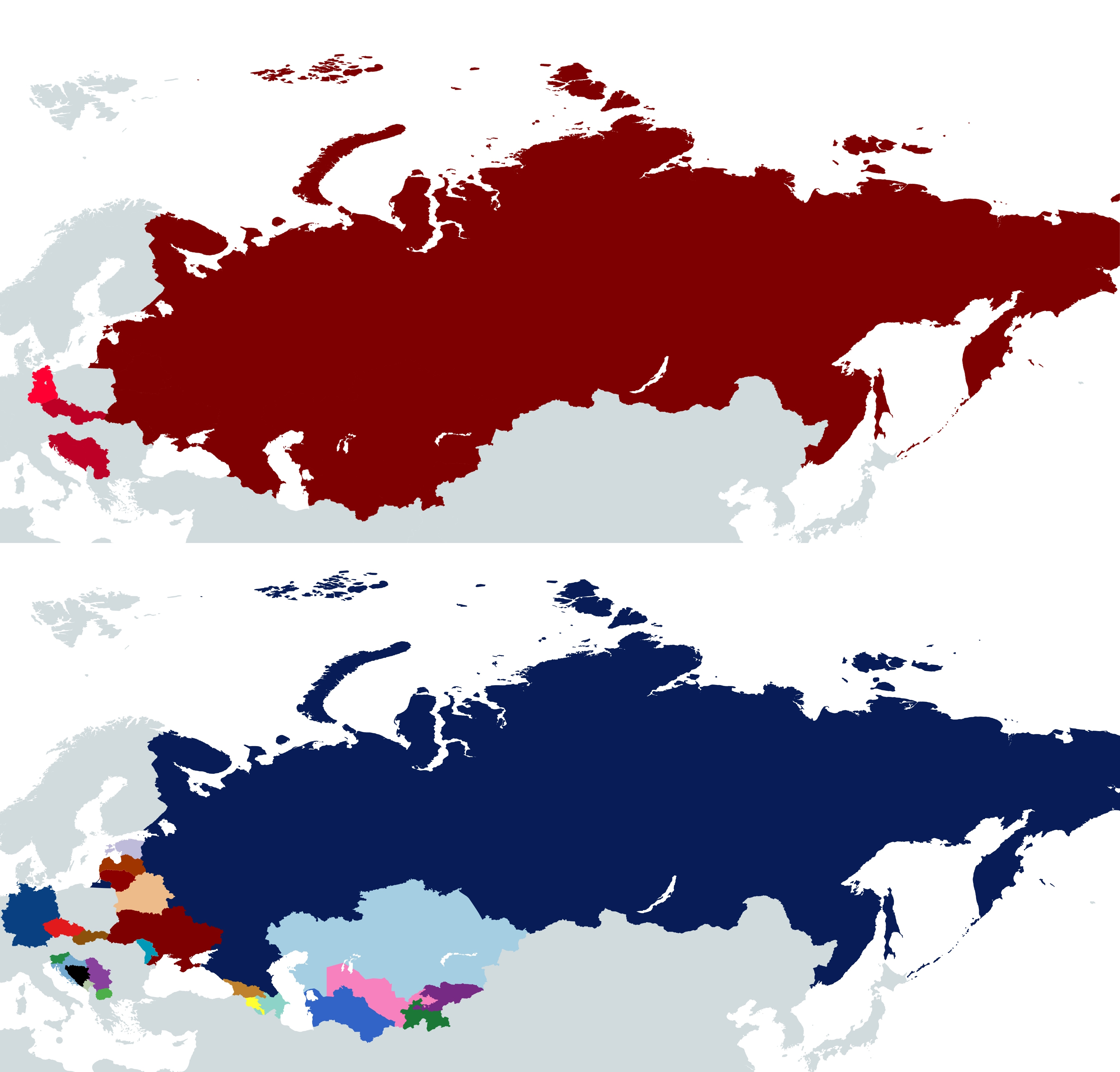
Changes in national boundaries after the end of the Cold War

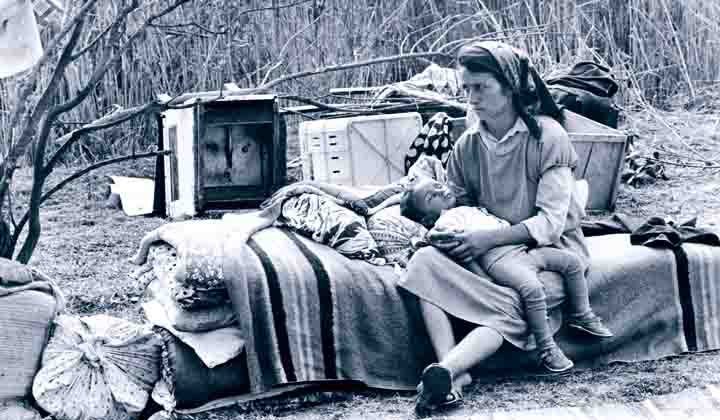
Internally displaced Azerbaijanis from Nagorno-Karabakh, 1993

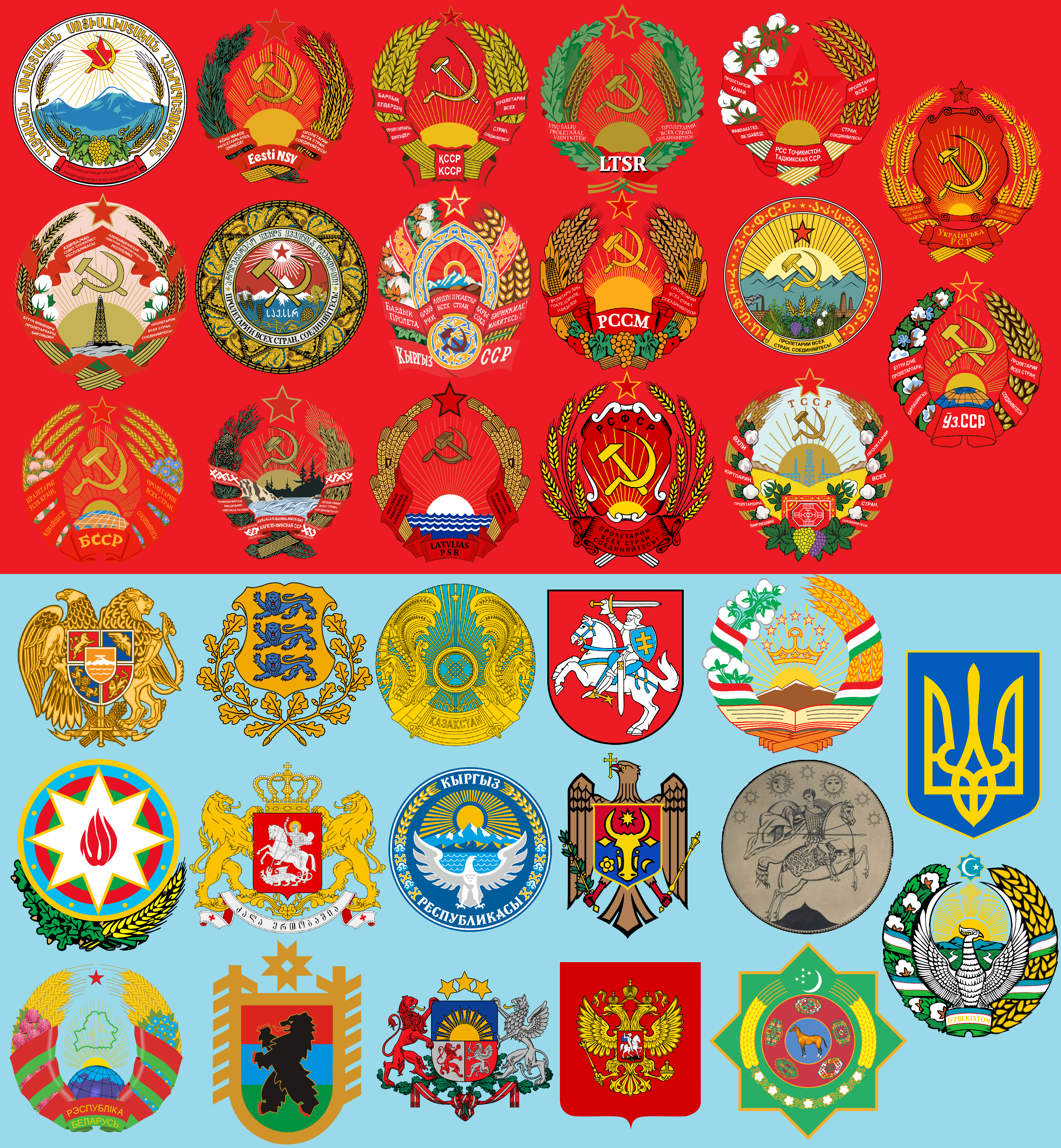
Country emblems of the Soviet Republics before and after the dissolution of the Soviet Union (the Transcaucasian Socialist Federative Soviet Republic (fifth in the second row) no longer exists as a political entity of any kind and the emblem is unofficial.)

The remaining 12 republics continued discussing new, increasingly looser, models of the Union. However, by December all except Russia and Kazakhstan had formally declared independence. During this time, Yeltsin took over what remained of the Soviet government, including the Moscow Kremlin. The final blow was struck on 1 December when Ukraine, the second-most powerful republic, voted overwhelmingly for independence. Ukraine's secession ended any realistic chance of the country staying together even on a limited scale.

On 8 December 1991, the presidents of Russia, Ukraine and Belarus (formerly Byelorussia), signed the Belavezha Accords, which declared the Soviet Union dissolved and established the Commonwealth of Independent States (CIS) in its place. While doubts remained over the authority of the accords to do this, on 21 December 1991, the representatives of all Soviet republics except Georgia signed the Alma-Ata Protocol, which confirmed the accords. On 25 December 1991, Gorbachev resigned as the President of the USSR, declaring the office extinct. He turned the powers that had been vested in the presidency over to Yeltsin. That night, the Soviet flag was lowered for the last time, and the Russian tricolour was raised in its place.

The following day, the Supreme Soviet, the highest governmental body, voted both itself and the country out of existence. This is generally recognized as marking the official, final dissolution of the Soviet Union as a functioning state, and the end of the Cold War. The Soviet Army initially remained under overall CIS command but was soon absorbed into the different military forces of the newly independent states. The few remaining Soviet institutions that had not been taken over by Russia ceased to function by the end of 1991.

Following the dissolution, Russia was internationally recognized as the USSR's legal successor on the international stage. To that end, Russia voluntarily accepted all Soviet foreign debt and claimed Soviet overseas properties as its own. Under the 1992 Lisbon Protocol, Russia also agreed to receive all nuclear weapons remaining in the territory of other former Soviet republics. Since then, the Russian Federation has assumed the Soviet Union's rights and obligations, and is widely viewed as the USSR's successor state. Ukraine has refused to recognize exclusive Russian claims to succession of the USSR and claimed such status for Ukraine as well, which was codified in Articles 7 and 8 of its 1991 law On Legal Succession of Ukraine. Since its independence in 1991, Ukraine has continued to pursue claims against Russia in foreign courts, seeking to recover its share of the foreign property that was owned by the USSR.

In summing up the international ramifications of these events, Vladislav Zubok stated: 'The collapse of the Soviet empire was an event of epochal geopolitical, military, ideological, and economic significance.' Before the dissolution, the country had maintained its status as one of the world's two superpowers for four decades after World War II through its hegemony in Eastern Europe, military strength, economic strength and scientific research, especially in space technology and weaponry.

=== Post-Soviet states ===
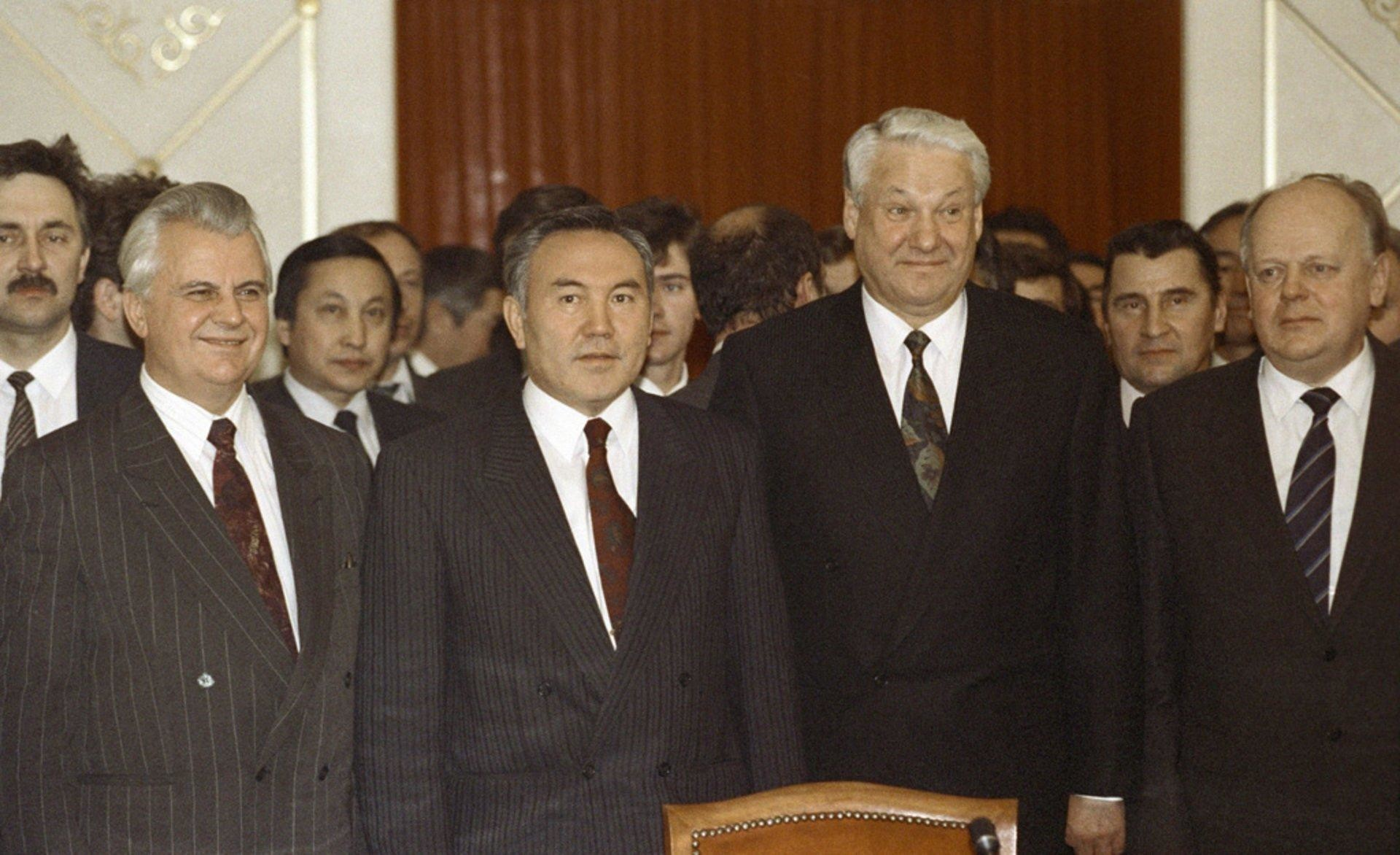
On 21 December 1991, the leaders of 11 former Soviet republics, including Russia and Ukraine, agreed to the Alma-Ata Protocols, formally establishing the Commonwealth of Independent States (CIS).

The analysis of the succession of states for the 15 post-Soviet states is complex. The Russian Federation is widely seen as the legal continuator state and is for most purposes the heir to the Soviet Union. It retained ownership of all former Soviet embassy properties, inheriting the full Soviet nuclear arsenal, and also inherited the Soviet Union's UN membership, with its permanent seat on the Security Council.

Of the two other co-founding states of the USSR at the time of the dissolution, Ukraine was the only one that had passed laws, similar to Russia, claiming it is a state-successor of both the Ukrainian SSR and the USSR. Soviet treaties laid groundwork for Ukraine's future foreign agreements as well as leading to the country agreeing to undertake 16.37% of debts of the Soviet Union for which it was going to receive its share of the USSR's foreign property. Russia's position as the 'only continuation of the USSR' that became widely accepted in the West, as well as constant pressure from the Western countries, allowed Russia to inherit Soviet state property abroad and conceal information about it. Due to that Ukraine never ratified 'zero option' agreement that Russian Federation had signed with other former Soviet republics, as it denied disclosing of information about Soviet Gold Reserves and its Diamond Fund. The dispute over former Soviet property and assets between the two former republics is still ongoing:

The conflict is unsolvable. We can continue to poke Kiev handouts in the calculation of 'solve the problem', only it won't be solved. Going to a trial is also pointless: for a number of European countries this is a political issue, and they will make a decision clearly in whose favor. What to do in this situation is an open question. Search for non-trivial solutions. But we must remember that in 2014, with the filing of the then Ukrainian Prime Minister Yatsenyuk, litigation with Russia resumed in 32 countries.

— Sergei Markov

Similar situation occurred with restitution of cultural property. Although on 14 February 1992 Russia and other former Soviet republics signed agreement 'On the return of cultural and historic property to the origin states' in Minsk, it was halted by the Russian State Duma that eventually passed 'Federal Law on Cultural Valuables Displaced to the USSR as a Result of the Second World War and Located on the Territory of the Russian Federation' which made restitution currently impossible, effectively barring the return of looted cultural heritage by Soviet troops during the Second World War to its original owners.

Russian GDP since the end of the Soviet Union

Estonia, Latvia, and Lithuania consider themselves as revivals of the three independent countries that existed prior to their occupation and annexation by the Soviet Union in 1940. They maintain that the process by which they were incorporated into the Soviet Union violated both international law and their own law, and that in 1990–1991 they were reasserting an independence that still legally existed.

Nearly all of the post-Soviet states suffered deep and prolonged recessions after shock therapy, with poverty increasing more than tenfold. In a 2001 study by the economist Steven Rosefielde, he calculated that there were 3.4 million premature deaths in Russia from 1990 to 1998, which he partly blames on the "shock therapy" that came with the Washington Consensus.

In 2011, The Guardian published an analysis of the former Soviet countries twenty years after the fall of the USSR. They found that "GDP fell as much as 50 percent in the 1990s in some republics... as capital flight, industrial collapse, hyperinflation and tax avoidance took their toll," but that there was a rebound in the 2000s, and by 2010 "some economies were five times as big as they were in 1991." Life expectancy has grown since 1991 in some of the countries, but fallen in others; likewise, some held free and fair elections, while others remained authoritarian.

There are additionally three states that claim independence from the other internationally recognized post-Soviet states but possess limited international recognition: Abkhazia, South Ossetia and Transnistria. The Armenian separatist movement of the Republic of Artsakh, Chechen separatist movement of the Chechen Republic of Ichkeria, the Gagauz separatist movement of the Gagauz Republic and the Talysh separatist movement of the Talysh-Mughan Autonomous Republic are other such cases which have already been resolved.

== See also ==
- Foreign relations of the Soviet Union
- Historiography in the Soviet Union – Study of history in the Soviet Union
  - Bibliography of the Soviet Union
  - Bibliography of the Asharshylyk
  - Bibliography of the Holodomor
- Islam in the Soviet Union
- List of Slavic studies journals – Academic journals about Slavic history and culture
- Seattle Commune in the Soviet Union
- Ukrainian nationalism – Nationalism in support of the collective identity of Ukraine

== Sources ==
- Davies, Robert; Wheatcroft, Stephen (2004). The Industrialisation of Soviet Russia Volume 5: The Years of Hunger: Soviet Agriculture 1931–1933. Palgrave Macmillan. ISBN 978-0-230-23855-8.
- Fischer, Louis (1964). The Life of Lenin. London: Weidenfeld and Nicolson.
- Goldstein, Erik (2013). The First World War Peace Settlements, 1919–1925. London: Routledge. ISBN 978-1-31-7883-678.
- Lee, Stephen J. (2003). Lenin and Revolutionary Russia. London: Routledge. ISBN 978-0-415-28718-0.
- Leggett, George (1981). The Cheka: Lenin's Political Police. Oxford: Oxford University Press. ISBN 978-0-19-822552-2.
- Mccauley, Martin (2014). The Rise and Fall of the Soviet Union. Taylor & Francis. ISBN 978-1-317-86783-8.
- Read, Christopher (2005). From Tsar to Soviets. Taylor & Francis. ISBN 978-1-135-36625-4.
- Ryan, James (2012). Lenin's Terror: The Ideological Origins of Early Soviet State Violence. London: Routledge. ISBN 978-1138815681.
- Service, Robert (2000). Lenin: A Biography. London: Macmillan. ISBN 978-0-333-72625-9.
- Service, Robert (2005). A History of Modern Russia from Nicholas II to Vladimir Putin. Harvard University Press. ISBN 978-0-674-01801-3.
- Wheatcroft, Stephen (1996). "The Scale and Nature of German and Soviet Repression and Mass Killings, 1930–45" (PDF). Europe-Asia Studies. 48 (8): 1319–1353. doi:10.1080/09668139608412415. JSTOR 152781.
- White, James D. (2001). Lenin: The Practice and Theory of Revolution. European History in Perspective. Basingstoke, England: Palgrave. ISBN 978-0-333-72157-5.
