= Shamim =

Shamim or Shameem may refer to

- Shamim (name), an Arabic male given name
- Shamim Reza Rubel murder in Bangladesh
- Mr. Shamim, a 2014 Pakistani sitcom drama series
- Baalshamin, a Northwest Semitic god and a title

== See also ==
- Shammi (disambiguation)
