= Shimi =

Shimi may refer to:

- a figure in the Bible; see Shimi (biblical figure)
- Shimi, Iran, a village in Semnan Province, Iran
