= Islam in the Soviet Union =

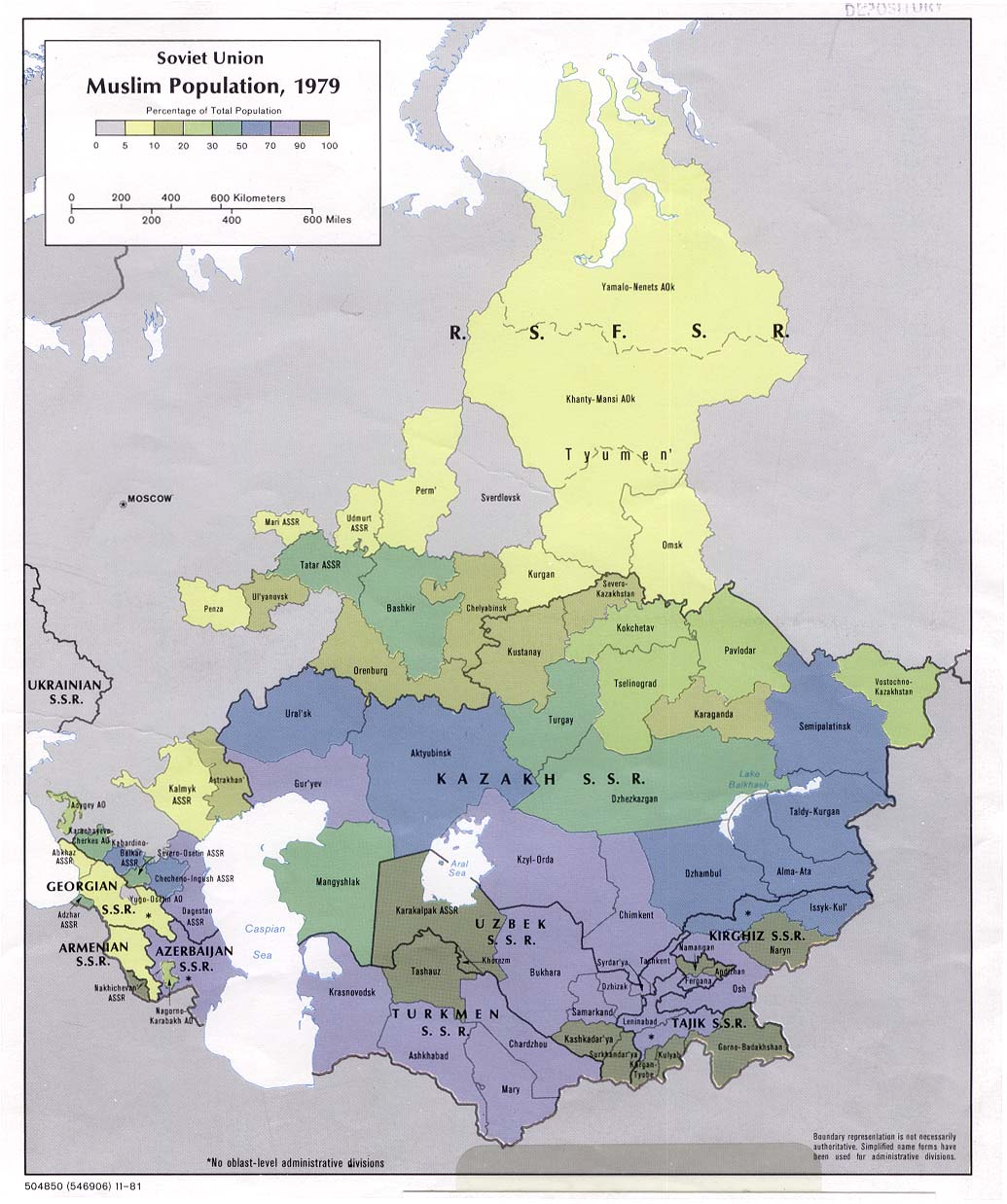
Demographic distribution of Muslims within the Soviet Union, as a percentage of the population by administrative division (1979)

Islam in the Soviet Union was the country's second-largest religion, and 90% of Muslims were adherents of Sunni Islam, with only around 10% adhering to Shia Islam. Excluding the Azerbaijan SSR, which had a Shia-majority population, all of the Muslim-majority Union Republics had Sunni-majority populations. In total, six Union Republics had Muslim-majority populations: the Azerbaijan SSR, the Kazakh SSR, the Kyrgyz SSR, the Tajik SSR, the Turkmen SSR, and the Uzbek SSR. There was also a large Muslim population across Volga–Ural and in the northern Caucasian regions of the Russian SFSR. Across Siberia, Muslims accounted for a significant proportion of the population, predominantly through the presence of Tatars. Many autonomous republics like the Karakalpak ASSR, the Chechen-Ingush ASSR, the Bashkir ASSR and others also had Muslim majorities.

Following their seizure of power, the Bolsheviks wanted to include as much territory of the former Russian Empire as possible into the nascent Soviet Union. However, they experienced difficulties during their attempts to impose communism within regions that had been under traditionalist Islamic influence for centuries (i.e., onto the Turkic peoples). While the communist state actively pursued a policy of state atheism, Soviet authorities allowed limited religious activities to continue in the six Muslim-majority Union Republics. Mosques operated in most large cities within these territories, though their numbers decreased dramatically; there were 25,000 mosques across the Russian Empire at the time of the Bolshevik Revolution in 1917, and only 500 mosques across the Soviet Union in the 1970s.

In 1989, as part of new Soviet policies that relaxed religious restrictions throughout the country, a number of new Muslim associations were formed and many of the mosques that had been closed by the government were reopened. The Soviet government also announced plans to permit the education of a limited number of imams in the cities of Ufa and Baku.

In the years leading up to the dissolution of the Soviet Union, between 45 and 50 million Soviet citizens identified as Muslims, though only around 500 mosques were in operation across the country. Islam was prosecuted and Soviet law forbade all Islamic religious activities outside of mosques and madrasas. All Islamic religious facilities were supervised by four "Spiritual Directorates" established by the Soviet government in order to provide oversight. Sunni Muslims were overseen by the Spiritual Directorate for Central Asia and Kazakhstan, the Spiritual Directorate for the European Soviet Union and Siberia, and the Spiritual Directorate for the Northern Caucasus and Dagestan. Shia Muslims were overseen by the Spiritual Directorate for Transcaucasia, though this establishment served Sunni Muslims as well.

== Lenin's rule ==
In 1917, Bolshevik revolutionary Vladimir Lenin published Imperialism, the Highest Stage of Capitalism, a highly influential text that shaped communist attitudes towards anti-capitalist struggles, and led to a policy of cultivating left-wing nationalists within the Muslim communities of the Russian Empire and in foreign colonies. After the February Revolution, an All-Russia Muslim Congress was held in Moscow in May 1917, celebrating the end of Tsarism. Following the October Revolution, representatives of the Muslim Congress met with Joseph Stalin, who agreed to transfer to them the Samarkand Codex of the Quran of Uthman, an important Islamic relic forcibly removed to the Imperial Public Library in Saint Petersburg during the Russian imperial conquest of Central Asia. Lenin and Anatoly Lunacharsky approved the Quran's repatriation in December 1917, representing the earliest known case of formerly-colonized peoples reclaiming cultural property looted during imperial conquest citing the principle of decolonization. In January 1918 the Quran was sent to the Muslim Congress' capital at Ufa and in August 1923 was returned to Turkestan.

Compared to the Christians (who comprised the state majority), Muslims in the Soviet Union were initially given more religious autonomy. This was in contrast to life under the tsars, when Muslims were suppressed and the Eastern Orthodox Church served in an official capacity in the Russian Empire, an erstwhile Christian state. On 24 November 1917, weeks after the Bolshevik Revolution, the Bolsheviks issued an appeal to "All the Muslim Workers of Russia and the East" under Lenin:

Muslims of Russia… all you whose mosques and prayer houses have been destroyed, whose beliefs and customs have been trampled upon by the tsars and oppressors of Russia: your beliefs and practices, your national and cultural institutions are forever free and inviolate. Know that your rights, like those of all the peoples of Russia, are under the mighty protection of the Revolution.

Furthermore, some principles of Islamic law were instituted alongside the communist legal system, Jadids and other Islamic socialists were given positions of power within the government, and an affirmative action system called korenizatsiya was implemented to help local Muslim populations develop an ideological harmony with Soviet communism. In the Union Republics of Central Asia, all of which hosted overwhelmingly Muslim-majority populations, Soviet law mandated Friday as a legal day of rest.

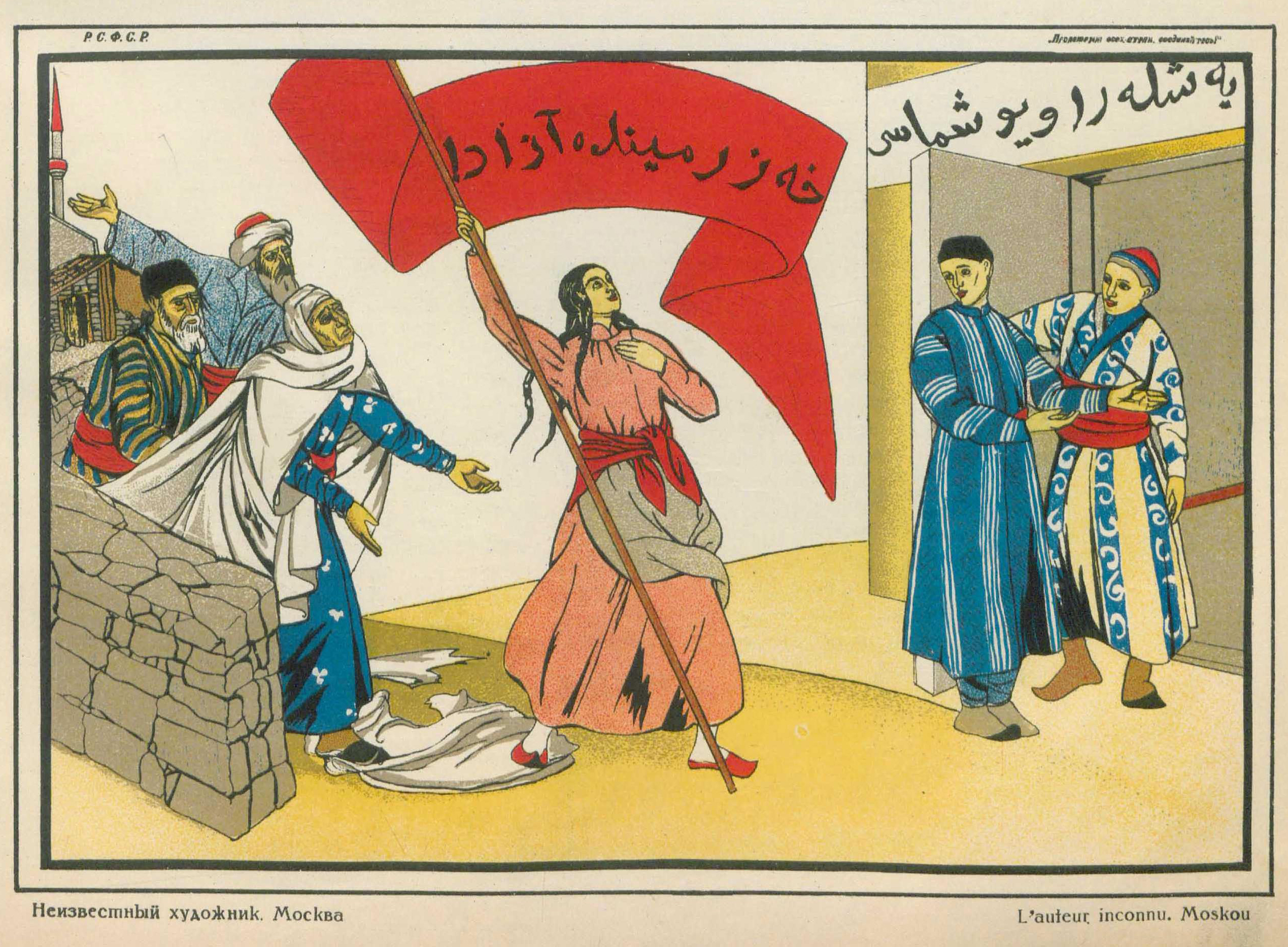
"I am free now!" communist propaganda poster by an unknown artist, encouraging the young women of Soviet Turkestan to join the Komsomol. Issued in Moscow in 1921.

=== Muslim national communism ===
Left-wing socialist Muslims began to develop a distinct variant of communism (i.e., national communism), which continued in the Soviet Union until 1928. National communists believed that the fate of the worldwide communist revolution ultimately depended on events within Asia and not within Europe. They also argued that alliances with the Russian bourgeoisie were necessary for the success of such a revolution; the overarching fear was that the failure to lessen class divisions would lead the bourgeoisie to ally with the Western world and thus ensure the collapse of the Soviet Union and the communist ideology.

The Soviet government believed that such variation from the traditional doctrines of the Communist Party of the Soviet Union would draw the attention of capitalist Western powers, inviting foreign intervention. It prompted the communist establishment to reject the arguments of the national communists as impractical at the Congress of the Peoples of the East, held in Baku in September 1920. Later, the perceived lack of united ideals also triggered further action against the larger national communist movement.

In 1928, a large-scale purging of the Muslim-majority Union Republics' leadership began with the execution of Veli İbraimov of the Tatar Communist Party and Milliy Firqa, who sought to push a nationalist ideology in favour of the Crimean Tatars. These were followed by the elimination of the leaders of the Muslim Social Democratic Party, the Tatar Communist Party, the Tatar Union of the Godless, and the Young Bukharans.

== Stalin's rule ==
When Joseph Stalin consolidated power in the second half of the 1920s, his policies regarding religion had changed. Mosques began to be closed or turned into warehouses throughout Central Asia, religious leaders were persecuted, religious schools were closed down, and waqfs were outlawed. The Soviet government interpreted the paranja (a traditional Central Asian female robe) as an embodiment of Muslim oppression against women; Stalin's policies led to the initiation of Hujum, a Soviet campaign that sought to strong-arm Islamic systems in Central Asia in order to eliminate practices that were seen as perpetuating male–female inequality, particularly the practice of pardah, which directed the large-scale seclusion of women from society. However, the campaign was unsuccessful, and Islamic veiling practices became more popular than ever among Muslim workers, whereas it had formerly been worn only by Muslim bourgeoisie. In the 1930s, during the period of Stalin's Great Purge, thousands of Muslim religious clerics were arrested and executed. Between 1929 and 1941, the vast majority of the country's mosques were shut down.

In addition to his anti-religion policies, Stalin's cult of personality effectively shut out Soviet citizens' freedom to practice Islam, Christianity, or any other religions.

=== Ethnic cleansing of Crimean Tatars ===
During World War II, particularly in 1943–1944, the Soviet government carried out a series of deportations to Siberia and the Union Republics of Central Asia. Collaboration with Nazi Germany was cited as the official reason for this policy, but this has been disputed by individuals and organizations, who characterize them as Soviet attempts at ethnic cleansing. In addition to non-Muslim ethnic groups, Muslim ethnicities subject to deportation policies included the Crimean Tatars, the Chechens, the Ingush, the Balkars, the Karachays, and the Meskhetian Turks. The Soviet deportation campaign resulted in a massive loss of life, in addition to widespread displacement.

Formally, the mass deportation of Crimean Tatars began on 17 May 1944. More than 32,000 officers of the People's Commissariat for Internal Affairs (NKVD) participated in displacing over 193,865 Crimean Tatars; 151,136 were sent to the Uzbek SSR, 8,597 were sent to the Mari ASSR, 4,286 were sent to the Kazakh SSR, and the remaining 29,846 were sent to various regions within the Russian SFSR. According to official NKVD figures, nearly 20% of the deportees died over the following year and a half, while Crimean Tatar activists have instead placed the casualty rate at around 46%.

== See also ==
- Deportation of the Crimean Tatars
- Operation Lentil (Caucasus)
- Persecution of Muslims in the Soviet Union
- Population transfer in the Soviet Union
- Shami-Damulla
- Soviet Orientalist studies in Islam
- Hujum
