= Shammi =

Shammi, Shammy or Shamy may refer to:

== People ==
=== Given name ===
- Shammi (actress) (1929–2018), Indian film actress
- Shammi Akhtar (1957–2018), Bangladeshi playback singer
- Shammi Iqbal (born 1975), English cricketer
- Shammi Kapoor (1931–2011), Indian film actor and director
- Shammi Narang (born 1956), Indian voice-over artist, news anchor, emcee, and entrepreneur
- Shammi Silva (born 1960), Sri Lankan cricket administrator
- Shammi Thilakan, Indian film actor
- Shammi Rana, (born 1978) Indian sports executives and administrators

=== Surname ===
- Ahmed Ismail El Shamy (born 1975), Egyptian boxer
- Aya El Shamy (born 1995), Egyptian volleyball player
- Mohamed El Shamy (born 1993), Egyptian footballer
- Hasan M. El-Shamy (born 1938), Egyptian-American folklore professor

== See also ==
- Chamois leather
- Shami (disambiguation)
- Shamim (disambiguation)
- Shamokin Shammies, early 20th century New York-Pennsylvania baseball team
