= Law on the Succession of Ukraine =

1991 law

Verkhovna Rada (Ukraine)
- Long title: Law of Ukraine on the Succession of Ukraine
- Citation: 1543-XII
- Enacted by: Verkhovna Rada
- Enacted: 12 September 1991
- Signed by: Chairman of the Verkhovna Rada
- Effective: 5 October 1991
- Status: In force

The Law on the Succession of Ukraine (Note: Ukrainian: Закон «Про правонаступництво України», romanized: Zakon «Pro pravonastupnytsvo Ukrajiny») is a key legal document (N 1543-XII) that played a particularly important role during the transitional period of Ukraine after the fall of the Soviet Union. The law was adopted by the Verkhovna Rada (Parliament of Ukraine) on 12 September 1991 and consisted of nine articles. The law became effective on 5 October 1991.

== Composition ==
- Article 1. From the moment of announcement the independence of Ukraine, the supreme state power in Ukraine is the Verkhovna Rada of Ukraine (Parliament of Ukraine) in the deputy composition of the Verkhovna Rada of the Ukrainian SSR.
- Article 2. Until the adoption of the new Constitution of Ukraine, the Constitution (Fundamental Law) of the Ukrainian SSR is in force on the territory of Ukraine.
- Article 3. Laws of the Ukrainian SSR and other acts adopted by the Verkhovna Rada of the Ukrainian SSR are in force on the territory of Ukraine in so far as they do not contradict the laws of Ukraine adopted after the announcement of the independence of Ukraine.
- Article 4. State authorities and agencies, offices of prosecutor, courts and arbitration courts that were formed on the basis of the Constitution (Fundamental Law) of the Ukrainian SSR are in force in Ukraine until the creation of state authorities and agencies, offices of prosecutor, courts and arbitration courts on the basis of the new constitution.
- Article 5. The state border of the USSR that separates the territory of Ukraine from other countries and border between the Ukrainian SSR and the Byelorussian SSR, the Russian SFSR, Moldova on 16 July 1990 is the state border of Ukraine.
- Article 6. Ukraine confirms its obligations under international treaties signed by the Ukrainian SSR before the announcement of the independence of Ukraine.
- Article 7. Ukraine is a legal successor of rights and obligations under international treaties of the USSR, which do not contradict the Constitution of Ukraine and interests of the republic.
- Article 8. Ukraine gives consent to service the foreign debt of the USSR on 16 July 1990 in the part that is defined by a separate international treaty. Ukraine is not obligated to credit contracts and agreements the USSR awarded after 1 July 1991 without the consent of Ukraine.
- Article 9. All citizens of the USSR who at the moment of announcement of the independence of Ukraine permanently lived on the territory of Ukraine are citizens of Ukraine. Ukraine guarantees to ensure human rights to every citizen of Ukraine, regardless of nationality or other factors according to international legal acts on human rights. The order of preservation, acquisition and loss of citizenship of Ukraine is regulated by the Law "On citizenship of Ukraine".

== Sources ==
- Zadorozhnii, Oleksandr (2016). International Law in the Relations of Ukraine and the Russian Federation. Kyiv: K.I.S. ISBN 978-617-684-146-3.
