= Shami Hassan =

Qatari footballer (born 1984)

Personal information
- Full name: Shami Hassan Al-Abdullah
- Date of birth: 8 March 1984 (age 42)
- Place of birth: Qatar
- Height: 1.80 m (5 ft 11 in)
- Position: Defender

Senior career*
Years	Team	Apps	(Gls)
2005–2009	Al-Rayyan		
2009–2010	Al-Kharaitiyat		
2010–2012	Al-Ahli		
2012–2014	Al-Wakra		
2014–2015	Al-Shahania		
2015–2016	Al-Khor		
2016–2017	Al-Kharaitiyat		
- * Club domestic league appearances and goals

Shami Hassan (Arabic:شامي حسن; born 8 March 1984) is a Qatari footballer who plays as a defender.
