= Shamim (name) =

Shamim or Shameem (Bengali: শামীম, Urdu: شمیم) is an Arabic/Persian unisex name that may refer to

Given name

- Shamim Aftab, Pakistani politician
- Shamim Ahamed Roni (born 1986), Bangladeshi film director and screenwriter
- Shamim Ahmad (born 1972), Indian politician
- Rana Shamim Ahmed Khan (born 1942), Pakistani politician
- Shamim Ahmed Khan (1938–2012), Indian sitarist and composer
- Shameem Akhtar, Bangladeshi film director and screenwriter
- Shamim Akhtar (born 1954), Pakistani politician
- Shamim Alam Khan (1937–2021), Pakistani general
- Shamim Ara (1938–2016), Pakistani film actress, film director and film producer
- Shamim Ara Nipa, Bangladeshi dancer and choreographer
- Shamim Ara Panhwar, Pakistani politician
- Shamim Azad (born 1952), Bangladeshi-born British poet, storyteller and writer
- Shamim Bano (1914–1984), Indian and Pakistani film actress
- Shamim Chowdhury, English television and print journalist
- Shameem Dev Azad (born 1955), Indian singer
- Shamim Farooqui (1943–2014), Indian Urdu poet
- Shamim Haider Patwary (born 1981), Bangladeshi politician
- Shamim Hanfi (1938–2021), Urdu critic and dramatist
- Shamim Hashimi (born 1947), Urdu and Persian poet
- Shamim Hashmi (1940–2006), Indian politician
- Shamim Hilaly (born 1947), Pakistani actress
- Shamim Hossain (born 2000), Bangladeshi cricketer
- Shamim Jairajpuri (1942–2024), Indian zoologist
- Shamim Jawad, Afghan children worker
- Shamim Kabir (1944–2019), Bangladeshi cricketer
- Shamim Kaisar Lincoln (born 1980), Bangladesh politician
- Shamim Karhani (1913–1975), Urdu-language poet
- Shamim M. Momin (born 1973), American art director
- Shamim Mumtaz (born 1957), Pakistani politician
- Shamim Osman (born 1961), Bangladesh politician
- Shamim Sarif (born 1969), British novelist and filmmaker
- Shaikh Shamim Ahmed (1938–2019), Indian politician and social worker
- Shamim Sikder (born 1953), Bangladeshi sculptor

Surname

- Aftab Iqbal Shamim (1936–2024), Urdu-language poet
- Alhaj Shamim Uddin (1931–2021), Pakistani politician
- Anwar Shamim (1931–2013), Pakistani Air Chief Marshal
- AKM Enamul Haque Shamim (born 1965), Bangladesh politician
- AKM Shamim Chowdhury, Bangladeshi journalist
- Arshad Shamim (born 1999), Singaporean professional footballer
- Bridget Shamim Bangi (born 1993), Ugandan badminton player
- Halitha Shameem, Indian film director, screenwriter and editor
- Khalid Shameem Wynne (1953–2017), Pakistani general
- Nazhat Shameem (born 1960), Fijian judge
- Rameen Shamim (born 1996), Pakistani cricketer
- S. A. Shamim, Indian politician
- Sardar Muhammad Shamim Khan (born 1958), Pakistani jurist
- Shaista Shameem, Fijian lawyer
- Zahidunnabi Dewan Shamim (born 1968), Bangladeshi physician, biomedical researcher, politician and social worker
