= Shimi, Iran =

Village in Semnan province, Iran

Shimi Persian: شیمی
- Village
- Location within Iran
- Coordinates: 35°27′08″N 54°36′18″E
- Country: Iran
- Province: Semnan
- County: Damghan
- District: Amirabad
- Rural District: Qohab-e Rastaq

Population (2016)
  - Total: 187
- Time zone: UTC+3:30 (IRST)

Shimi (Persian: شیمی) (Note: Also romanized as Shīmī; also known as Shemī) is a village in Qohab-e Rastaq Rural District of Amirabad District in Damghan County, Semnan province, Iran.

== Demographics ==
=== Population ===
At the time of the 2006 National Census, the village's population was 156 in 38 households. The following census in 2011 counted 227 people in 61 households. The 2016 census measured the population of the village as 187 people in 55 households.
