= Shami-Damulla =

Muslim scholar in Soviet Central Asia (d. 1932)

Shami-Damulla (died 1932) (Russian: Шами-дамулла) was a nickname for Sa‘id ibn Muhammad ibn ‘Abd al-Wahid ibn ‘Ali al-‘Asali al-Tarablusi al-Shami al-Dimashqi, an important figure in the development of Islamic fundamentalism in Soviet Central Asia. Among his followers was Ziyauddin Babakhan, the second mufti of the Spiritual Administration of the Muslims of Central Asia and Kazakhstan.

Before settling in Central Asia in 1919, Shami-Domulla travelled to Iran, Afghanistan and Kashmir. Originally from Cairo, he was an Al-Azhar educated scholar. Shami-Domulla seems to have been influenced by the movement during the 15-20 years that he lived in Xinjiang; the Salafist movement was particularly influential in Xinjiang where it was a counter to Sufism. He moved to Tashkent in 1919 with the support of the Russian consul in Kashgar.

The Bolsheviks then saw him as a potential support of “Islamic socialism”, but came to arrest him in 1932 for fundamentalism. His followers nonetheless continued his work and contributed to the development of Islamic fundamentalism in Soviet Central Asia.
