= 1917 Moscow District Duma elections =

Elections to Moscow District Dumas were held on October 7 [O.S. September 24] 1917. It was the second of the three general elections in Moscow in 1917, between the City Duma election of June 1917 and the All-Russian Constituent Assembly election in November. The Bolshevik Party won a landslide victory, obtaining an absolute majority in 11 out of 17 districts and a plurality in another 3 districts. The Kadet Party finished in second place, able to retain most of their support base from the June 1917 Moscow City Duma election whilst the support for the moderate socialists who had won the June 1917 election collapsed. The electoral participation was low.

== 1917 administrative district reform ==
Following the 1917 February Revolution, roles previously performed by the Czarist police and city administration in Moscow were taken over by local citizens committees. These citizens committees in turn operated as local organs of the Committee of Public Organizations. Over fifty such committees existed by mid-1917. After the election of a new City Duma in June 1917 a process to regulate the local administrations in the city began. On July 13 [O.S. June 30] 1917, the Commission on District Dumas was created, in which all major political parties were represented. The Commission on District Dumas was tasked with the reorganization of districts into larger units and technical preparations for district-level elections. The Commission on District Dumas outlined the plan for creating 17 new administrative districts. On August 18 [O.S. August 5] 1917 the Commission on District Dumas adopted a resolution stating that it was 'considered desirable to hold elections to district dumas on the basis of universal, direct, secret and equal suffrage in September'.

On September 4 [O.S. August 22] 1917 the Moscow City Duma adopted a resolution deciding to replace the now defunct pre-revolutionary police sectors with 17 administrative districts 'in order to organize the public city life'. Notably, these geographic boundaries of these 17 new administrative districts did not line up with the boundaries of the 11 soviet districts that had emerged in March 1917.

By the decision of the Moscow City Duma on September 4 [O.S. August 22] 1917, elections for District Dumas (municipal assemblies) to govern the 17 new administrative districts were scheduled for October 7 [O.S. September 24] 1917 - thus providing roughly a month for the political parties to conduct their election campaigns. Administrative districts with a population of up to 75,000 eligible voters would elected a District Duma consisting of 30 members, districts whose population ranged from 75,000 to 100,000 voters would elect 35 members, districts with from 100,000 to 125,000 eligible voters 40 members, districts with 125,000 to 150,000 eligible voters would elect 45 members, and lastly districts with more than 150,000 eligible voters would elect District Dumas with 50 members.

No.	Areas from the previous Czarist administration	New district name	No. of District Duma seats	Map of the new districts
1.	Myasnitskaya Sector in Bely Gorod, Yauzskaya Sector in Zemlyanoy Gorod, Sretenskaya Sector	Myasnitsko-Yauzsky District	50	
2.	Tverskaya Sector in Bely Gorod	Gorodskoi District	45	
3.	Prechistenskaya Sector and Arbatskaya Sector in Zemlyanoy Gorod	Prechistensko-Arbatsky District	45	
4.	Yakimanskaya Sector in Zemlyanoy Gorod	Kaluzhsky District	40	
5.	Pyatinitskaya Sector in Zemlyanoy Gorod, without Nizhnie Kotly	Pyatnitsky District	50	
6.	Third Precinct of the Rogozhsky Sector, Simonovsky Precinct in the suburbs	Simonovsky District	35	
7.	The First and Second Precincts of the Rogozhsky Sector, a part of the Third Precinct of the Lefortovo Sector, Novoandronyevsky Precinct in the suburbs	Rogozhsky District	45	
8.	Second Precinct of Lefortovo Sector, Cherkizovo, Blagusha	Preobrazhensky District	35	
9.	Second and Fourth Precincts of the Meshchansky Sector, a part of the First Precinct of Lefortovo Precinct, Bogorodsky Precinct, the Pogonny-Losiny Ostrov suburb	Sokolnichesky District	40	
10.	Second Precinct of the Yauzsky Sector in Zemlyanoy Gorod, Basmannye Sector, parts of the First and Third Precincts of the Lefortovo Sector, Syromyatniki	Lefortovo District	50	
11.	Alekseevsky Precinct in the suburbs, as well as the suburbs Vladykino, Ostankino, Rostokino, Nizhny Likhobory, Leonovo, Marfino	Alekseevsky District	30	
12.	First and Third Precincts of the Meshchansky Sector, First and Third Precincts of the Sushchevsky Sector	Meshchansky District	45	
13.	Sushchevsky Sector and Mar'insky Precinct in the suburbs	Sushchevsky-Mar'insky District	50	
14.	Petrovsko-Razumovskoye	Butyrsky District	30	
15.	new entity	Petrovsky District	30	
16.	Presnensky Sector	Presnensky District	45	
17.	Khamovnicheskaya Sector, and suburbs Poklonnaya Gora and Potylikha	Khamovnichesky District	45	

== Parties in the fray and electoral campaigning ==
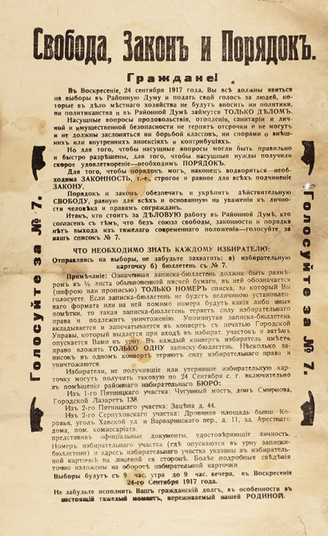
Leaflet calling on voters to support List 7

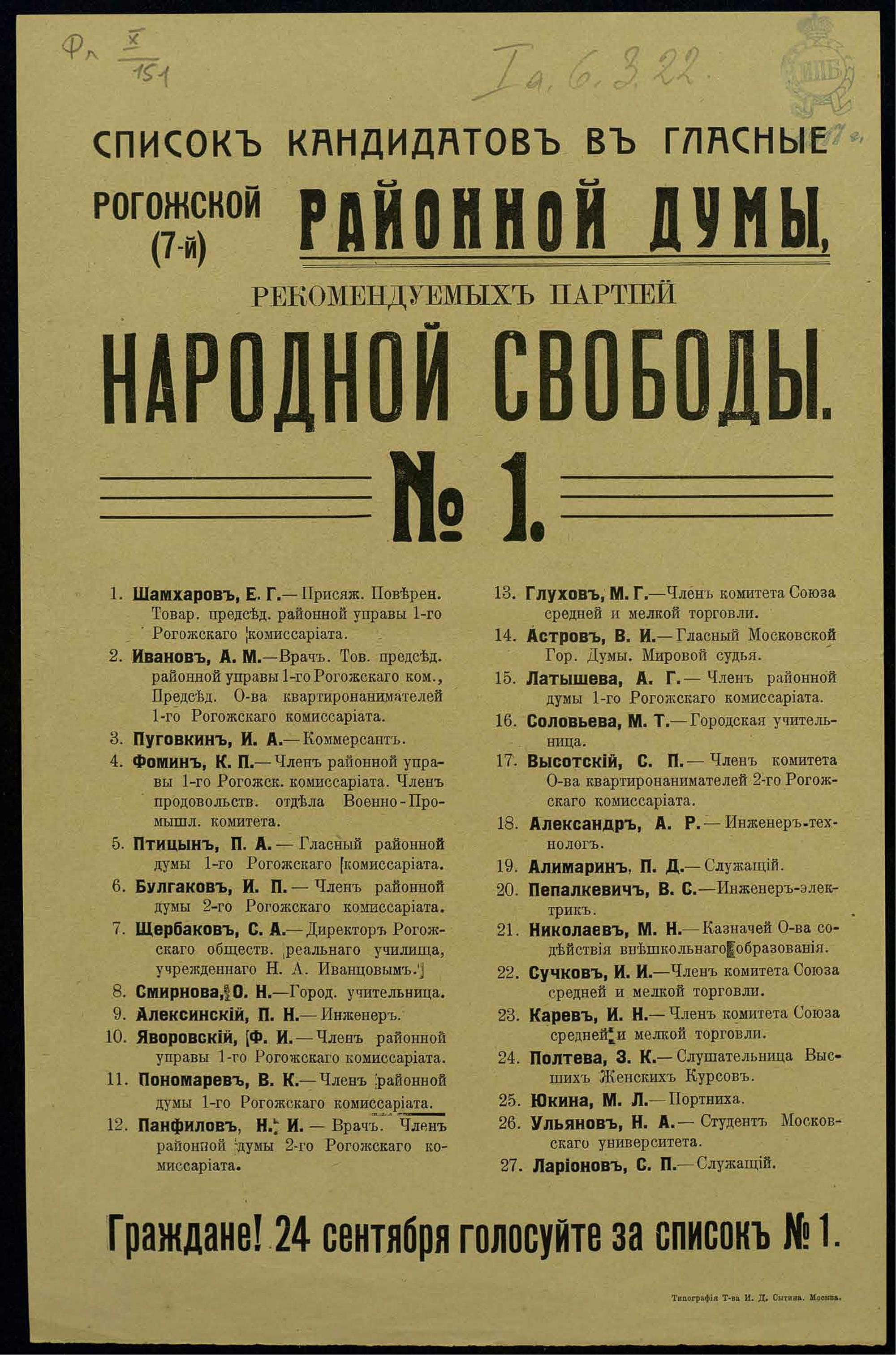
List of Kadet candidates in the Rogozhsky District

Overall the electoral campaigns were dull and muted, as both the political parties and the electorate showed little interest in the District Duma elections. The Moscow press (dailies like Zemlya i Volya, Vlast Naroda, Vpered, Trud and Svobodny Narod) provided very limited coverage on the election campaign. Most of the high-ranking political leaders were too busy with other national political issues to spend time campaigning a local-level election. Some political parties had presented their slate of candidates in the last minute before the deadline.

On September 19 [O.S. September 6] 1917 the District Duma Election Commission approved the submitted lists of candidates, marking the formal beginning of the election campaign. 18 lists were registered, but List 9 was removed to avoid confusion with List 6. The parties with the largest numbers of candidates were the Socialist-Revolutionaries (648 candidates), Bolsheviks (558 candidates), Kadets (518 candidates) and the Mensheviks (347 candidates). In two districts there was no Menshevik list in the fray.

By the time of the District Duma election campaign the United Social Democratic faction was in shambles. They had stopped publishing their newspaper Proletary in June 1917 due to financial problems and many of their leaders had now defected to other factions. Nevertheless, they fielded their own slate in 8 districts. They had initially adopted a resolution calling for forming a joint electoral bloc with the Bolsheviks. But the Moscow Committee of the Bolshevik Party vehemently rejected the invitation. The United S-D leader Nikolai Rozhkov then reached out to the Mensheviks, but they also rejected an electoral alliance with Rozhkov's faction (based on experiences of having had a joint electoral bloc with the United S-D in the June 1917 City Duma election). On the right, the Octobrists were still trying to recover from their set-backs in the June 1917 City Duma election and opted not to field any candidature of their own. Instead the Octobrists threw their weight behind the Kadets, supplying the Kadet electoral campaign with significant financial resources.

A notable feature of the Moscow District Duma election was the emergence of several 'non-party' lists; Home-Owners Union (list 7), Business Group (list 11), Union of Apartment Tenants (list 12), Association of Tenants of Rooms, Corners and Beds (list 13), Non-Party Group (list 14), Union of Parents of Students (list 15, for which no votes were recorded in any district), Economic and Business Group (list 16), Group of Public Workers (list 17) and Group of Residents of the Khamovnichesky District (list 18). These groups tended to play on slogans of 'less talk, more action', and arguing that the business acumen of their leaders would make them better representatives than the main political parties. Commenting on the phenomenon of the 'non-party lists' in the Moscow District Duma election, Josef Stalin wrote that "[t]here is no doubt that under the flag of non-party lists are hiding pro-Cadet bourgeois who are afraid to come out openly and who are trying to sneak into district dumas by contraband".

The group that attached more significance to the District Duma election was the Bolshevik Party. The Bolsheviks felt emboldened by the results of the recent Petrograd City Duma election. Following the political line laid out by the Sixth Party Congress, the Moscow Committee of the Bolshevik Party sought to use the election campaign to promote the party line among the masses and mobilized all of its capacities for agitation and propaganda. Bolshevik candidates were reviewed by the Municipal Commission of the Moscow Committee of the party, to be confirmed by a general meeting of the Moscow Committee and Bolshevik deputies.

Mikhail Vladimirsky led the Bolshevik electoral campaign. The trade union leader Mikhail Tomsky helped organize the campaign. The Bolshevik election campaign sought to link the general political line of the party with the every-day issues of workers, soldiers and the urban poor. The Bolshevik election campaign included slogans on housing shortage, bread queues and capitalist sabotage of the Moscow economy. The campaign argued that through local governance, problems of food and economy could be resolved locally in Moscow. The party organ Sotsial-Demokrat reported in detail on work of the District Duma Election Commission. Sotsial-Demokrat' would repeatedly publish calls for vigilance on electoral irregularities, calling on readers to report any complaints. In parallel to the District Duma election campaign, the Bolsheviks won control over the Moscow Soviet in the election of soviet deputies on October 2 [O.S. September 19] 1917.

Bolshevik candidates in the 1917 Moscow District Duma election
No.	District	Top candidate of the Bolshevik Party
1	Myasnitsko-Yauzsky District	Grigory Usievich
2	Gorodskoi District	Aleksandr Borshevsky
3	Prechistensko-Arbatsky District	Vadim Podbelsky
4	Kaluzhsky District	Georgy Oppokov (Lomov)
5	Pyatnitsky District	Josef Fradkin (Boris Volin)
6	Simonovsky District	Nikolai Bukharin
7	Rogozhsky District	Ivan Skvortsov
8	Preobrazhensky District	Andrei Znamensky
9	Sokolnichesky District	Ivan Rusakov
10	Lefortovo District	Vasily Yesin
11	Alekseevsky District	I. P. Frolov
12	Meshchansky District	Josef Fradkin (Boris Volin)
13	Sushchevsky-Mar'insky District	Vasily Likhachev (Blas)
14	Butyrsky District	Grigory Usievich
15	Petrovsky District	Yefim Afonin
16	Presnensky District	Yemelyan Yaroslavsky
17	Khamovnichesky District	Zinovy Solovyov

== Results ==
Voting took place on October 7 [O.S. September 24] 1917, a Sunday. There was a high degree of voter abstention. Out of the 1,028,700 eligible voters, some 37% cast their ballots in the election.

=== Bolshevik victory ===
The result of the District Duma election was a decisive victory of the Bolsheviks. Their vote had increased by 162% since the June 1917 City Duma election. The working-class areas tended to have higher rates of participation, which contributed to increasing the Bolshevik share of votes. The Bolsheviks won an absolute majority of the votes in 11 out of the 17 districts. In these 11 districts, where the Bolshevik vote ranged to 50.8% to 69.4%, there was a working-class majority and many military garrisons were located there. In the remaining 6 districts (Myasnitsko-Yauzsky, Gorodskoi, Prechistensko-Arbatsky, Alekseevsky, Meshansky and Presnensky) where there were large numbers of aristocratic and petty bourgeoisie elements among the voters. The Bolsheviks obtained about a third of the votes in these 6 districts. Only in 3 inner-city districts did the Kadets win more votes than the Bolsheviks. In the 'silk-stocking' Prechistensko-Arbatsky District the Kadets won an absolute majority of the votes and the Bolsheviks scored their lowest vote share compared to all other Moscow districts. Bolsheviks leaders elected to the District Dumas included Rosalia Zemlyachka, Yemelyan Yaroslavsky, Ivan Skvortsov-Stepanov, Mikhail Vladimirsky, Vasily Likhachev (Blas)), Mikhail Olminsky, Grigory Usievich, Vadim Podbelsky and Ivan Rusakov.

Per Koenker (2014) there was a notable turnout among chemical industry workers (who represented some 7% of the Moscow workforce), among whom the Bolsheviks had a strong support. But on the other hand she argues that districts with metal and textile industry workers tended to have lower participation, even though the metal industry workers was a group known to support the Bolsheviks.

=== Polarization of the electorate ===
The Kadets received a similar number of votes in each district as in the June 1917 City Duma election. Per Koenker (2014) it is probable that the Kadets continued to appeal to literate and female voters, which were groups among whom the Bolsheviks were weaker. In the period between the June and September elections (during which the July Days and the Kornilov Affair had occurred), the electorate had been polarized along class lines between the Kadets and the Bolsheviks. Parties that had a more mixed class character were routed.

In the June 1917 City Duma election, the Socialist-Revolutionaries had been the most-voted party in all sectors of the city. Now the SR vote had collapsed, losing votes everywhere. The sharpest decline of SR votes took place in the Preobrazhensky District, an area of recent industrial expansion. The smallest decline of SR vote occurred in the Petrovsky District, which had a significant population of soldiers. The Menshevik vote also collapsed. But according to Koenker (2014) the Bolshevik vote had grown mainly at the expense of the SRs, as in areas with the greatest increases of Bolshevik votes where places where the Mensheviks had a weak performance in the June 1917 City Duma election.

=== Evacuees ===
Per Koenker (2014) there is correlation between the number of evacuees from the western provinces. In districts were the evacuees was a larger group (at most they constituted 16% of the electorate in a single district) the SRs and Mensheviks fared better. However, Koenker states that it is not certain whether the evacuees were more likely to vote for the SRs and Mensheviks or whether the presence of large numbers of refugees prompted other residents to be swayed towards defencist positions.

=== Military votes ===
Commenting on the election result the Kadet newspaper Russkie Vedomosti complained that "[t]he victory of the Bolsheviks was significantly facilitated by [the voting at] military units". Sotsial-Demokrat published results from the voting at 15 out the 24 military units in the city. At these 15 military units the Bolsheviks obtained 14,467 votes out of 17,819 total votes cast. At a number of military units the Bolsheviks obtained more than 90% of the votes cast. At the heavy artillery workshops 2,286 votes went to the Bolsheviks out of a total of 2,347 votes cast (97.4%).

=== Detailed results ===
==== Summary of election result ====
List No.	Party	Votes	%	Seats
5	Bolsheviks	199,337	51.47%	359
1	Kadet Party	101,826	26.29%	184
3	Party of Socialist-Revolutionaries	54,410	14.05%	103
4	Mensheviks	15,794	4.08%	32
10	Council of Working Intelligentsia Deputies	4,007	1.03%	6
2	Popular Socialist Party	3,801	0.98%	7
8	United Social Democrats	2,314	0.60%	4
12	Union of Apartment Tenants	1,519	0.39%	4
14	Non-Party Group	1,482	0.38%	7
7	Home-Owners Union	883	0.23%	1
13	Association of Tenants of Rooms, Corners and Beds	489	0.13%	1
16	Economic and Business Group	485	0.13%	1
17	Group of Public Workers	433	0.11%	1
6	Unity	413	0.11%	0
11	Business Group	62	0.02%	0
18	Group of Residents of the Khamovnichesky District	12	0.00%	0

There are some minor discrepancies between different sources regarding the exact vote count between some of the contemporary reporting on the election.

==== Votes per list and district ====
District		Lists																
No.	Name	1	2	3	4	5	6	7	8	10	11	12	13	14	16	17	18	Total
1	Myasnitsko-Yauzsky District	11,547	507	4,435	910	8,109	101			295								25,904
2	Gorodskoi District	9,814	363	3,057	676	7,306				197								21,413
3	Prechistensko-Arbatsky District	13,238	563	2,315	836	4,407	251		87	997								22,694
4	Kaluzhsky District	7,182	196	2,386	1,007	13,554			101	186								24,612
5	Pyatnitsky District	6,762	280	4,231	1,489	24,334		883	96	353	62							38,490
6	Simonovsky District	2,254		2,287		9,979			348			343	23	514				15,748
7	Rogozhsky District	4,259	151	3,864		15,831			519	94		368	83		485			25,654
8	Preobrazhensky District	2,774		2,130	995	14,055								301				20,255
9	Sokolnichesky District	3,603	100	3,909	2,071	12,171				445			383					22,682
10	Lefortovo District	6,772	177	4,639	972	20,759	61			296		319						33,995
11	Alekseevsky District			949	317	1,870						200		667				4,003
12	Meshchansky District	9,183	227	3,886	1,252	10,803			201	252								25,804
13	Sushchevsky-Mar'insky District	8,954	487	4,045	1,443	16,406			500	250		191						32,276
14	Butyrsky District	1,671	177	1,308	288	5,256												8,700
15	Petrovsky District	1,493		1,926	420	8,632						98				433		13,002
16	Presnensky District	6,230	295	5,842	1,835	10,499				372								25,073
17	Khamovnichesky District	6,090	278	3,201	1,283	15,366			462	270							12	26,962
	Total	101,826	3,801	54,410	15,794	199,337	413	883	2,314	4,007	62	1,519	489	1,482	485	433	12	387,267

==== Percentage of votes per list and district ====
District		Lists															
No.	Name	1	2	3	4	5	6	7	8	10	11	12	13	14	16	17	18
1	Myasnitsko-Yauzsky District	44.58	1.96	17.12	3.51	31.30	0.39			1.14							
2	Gorodskoi District	45.83	1.70	14.28	3.16	34.12				0.92							
3	Prechistensko-Arbatsky District	58.33	2.48	10.20	3.68	19.42	1.11		0.38	4.39							
4	Kaluzhsky District	29.18	0.80	9.69	4.09	55.07			0.41	0.76							
5	Pyatnitsky District	17.57	0.73	10.99	3.87	63.22		2.29	0.25	0.92	0.16						
6	Simonovsky District	14.31		14.52		63.37			2.21			2.18	0.15	3.26			
7	Rogozhsky District	16.60	0.59	15.06		61.71			2.02	0.37		1.43	0.32		1.89		
8	Preobrazhensky District	13.70		10.52	4.91	69.39								1.49			
9	Sokolnichesky District	15.88	0.44	17.23	9.13	53.66				1.96			1.69				
10	Lefortovo District	19.92	0.52	13.65	2.86	61.06	0.18			0.87		0.94					
11	Alekseevsky District			23.71	7.92	46.71						5.00		16.66			
12	Meshchansky District	35.59	0.88	15.06	4.85	41.87			0.78	0.98							
13	Sushchevsky-Mar'insky District	27.74	1.51	12.53	4.47	50.83			1.55	0.77		0.59					
14	Butyrsky District	19.21	2.03	15.03	3.31	60.41											
15	Petrovsky District	11.48		14.81	3.23	66.39						0.75				3.33	
16	Presnensky District	24.85	1.18	23.30	7.32	41.87				1.48							
17	Khamovnichesky District	22.59	1.03	11.87	4.76	56.99			1.71	1.00							0.04
	All 17 districts	26.29	0.98	14.05	4.08	51.47	0.11	0.23	0.60	1.03	0.02	0.39	0.13	0.38	0.13	0.11	0.00

==== Seat distribution per District Duma ====
No.	District	1	2	3	4	5	7	8	10	12	13	14	16	17	Total
1	Myasnitsko-Yauzsky District	22	1	8	2	16			1						50
2	Gorodskoi District	21	1	6	2	15									45
3	Prechistensko-Arbatsky District	26	1	5	2	9			2						45
4	Kaluzhsky District	12		4	2	22									40
5	Pyatnitsky District	9		6	2	32	1								50
6	Simonovsky District	5		5		22		1		1		1			35
7	Rogozhsky District	7		7		28		1		1			1		45
8	Preobrazhensky District	5		4	2	24									35
9	Sokolnichesky District	6		7	4	21			1		1				40
10	Lefortovo District	10		7	2	31									50
11	Alekseevsky District			8	3	11				2		6			30
12	Meshchansky District	16		7	2	19			1						45
13	Sushchevsky-Mar'insky District	14	1	6	2	26		1							50
14	Butyrsky District	6	1	4	1	18									30
15	Petrovsky District	4		4	1	20								1	30
16	Presnensky District	11	1	10	3	19			1						45
17	Khamovnichesky District	10	1	5	2	26		1							45
	Total	184	7	103	32	359	1	4	6	4	1	7	1	1	710

==== Comparison with June 1917 City Duma election ====
		Bolshevik				Kadets				Soc-Rev.				Menshevik				Others				Total	
No.	District	Votes	+/–	%	+/–	Votes	+/–	%	+/–	Votes	+/–	%	+/–	Votes	+/–	%	+/–	Votes	+/–	%	+/–	Votes	+/–
1	Myasnitsko-Yauzsky District	8,109	+5,669	31.30	+25.77	11,547	-638	44.58	+16.94	4,435	-20,579	17.12	-39.62	910	-2,080	3.51	-3.27	903	-554	3.49	+0.18	25,904	-18,182
2	Gorodskoi District	7,306	+5,579	34.12	+29.29	9,814	-398	45.83	+17.30	3,057	-17,111	14.28	-42.08	676	-2,011	3.16	-4.35	560	-433	2.62	-0.16	21,413	-14,374
3	Prechistensko-Arbatsky District	4,407	+3,172	19.42	+16.31	13,238	-1,852	58.33	+20.29	2,315	-15,251	10.20	-34.09	836	-3,399	3.68	-6.99	1,898	+362	8.36	+4.49	22,694	-16,968
4	Kaluzhsky District	13,554	+6,732	55.07	+37.77	7,182	+1,369	29.18	+14.44	2,386	-18,901	9.69	-44.30	1,007	-3,907	4.09	-8.37	483	-105	1.96	+0.47	24,612	-14,812
5	Pyatnitsky District	24,334	+15,967	63.22	+46.75	6,762	-493	17.57	+3.29	4,231	-24,829	10.99	-46.22	1,489	-3,881	3.87	-6.70	1,674	+930	4.35	+2.88	38,490	-12,306
6	Simonovsky District	9,979	+7,481	63.37	+54.73	2,254	-406	14.31	+5.12	2,287	-17,144	14.52	-52.66		-2,664		-9.21	1,228	-440	7.80	+2.03	15,748	-13,173
7	Rogozhsky District	15,831	+13,082	61.71	+53.78	4,259	+372	16.60	+5.38	3,864	-17,220	15.06	-45.78		-5,870		-16.94	1,700	+639	6.63	+3.56	25,654	-8,997
8	Preobrazhensky District	14,055	+6,379	69.39	+50.21	2,774	-846	13.70	+4.65	2,130	-20,613	10.52	-46.33	995	-4,761	4.91	-9.47	301	+86	1.49	+0.95	20,255	-19,755
9	Sokolnichesky District	12,171	+8,668	53.66	+43.03	3,603	-811	15.88	+2.49	3,909	-13,697	17.23	-36.21	2,071	-4,374	9.13	-10.43	928	-46	4.09	+1.13	22,682	-10,260
10	Lefortovo District	20,759	+11,543	61.06	+43.90	6,772	-950	19.92	+5.54	4,639	-21,461	13.65	-34.98	972	-4,822	2.86	-7.93	853	-3,995	2.51	-6.52	33,995	-19,685
11	Alekseevsky District	1,870	+952	46.71	+35.12		-704		-8.89	949	-4,362	23.71	-43.37	317	-617	7.92	-3.88	867	+816	21.66	+21.01	4,003	-3,915
12	Meshchansky District	10,803	+7,779	41.87	+33.65	9,183	+2,433	35.59	+17.25	3,886	-18,035	15.06	-44.49	1,252	-3,252	4.85	-7.38	680	+69	2.64	+0.98	25,804	-11,006
13	Sushchevsky-Mar'insky District	16,406	+9,645	50.83	+40.22	8,954	-742	27.74	+12.53	4,045	-32,975	12.53	-45.55	1,443	-7,766	4.47	-9.98	1,428	+382	4.42	+2.78	32,276	-31,456
14	Butyrsky District	5,256	+3,306	60.41	+48.30	1,671	-395	19.21	+6.37	+1,308	-8,722	15.03	-47.29	288	-1,518	3.31	-7.91	177	-65	2.03	+0.53	8,700	-7,394
15	Petrovsky District	8,632	+7,524	66.39	+58.65	1,493	-2,886	11.48	-19.11	1,926	-5,679	14.81	-38.32	420	-653	3.23	-4.27	531	+382	4.08	+3.04	13,002	-1,312
16	Presnensky District	10,499	+7,621	41.87	+35.27	6,230	-106	24.85	+10.32	5,842	-23,988	23.30	-45.11	1,835	-2,099	7.32	-1.70	667	+39	2.66	+1.22	25,073	-18,533
17	Khamovnichesky District	15,366	+11,749	56.99	+48.03	6,090	+195	22.59	+7.98	3,201	-21,971	11.87	-50.49	1,283	-3,787	4.76	-7.80	1,022	+409	3.79	+2.27	26,962	-13,405
	Total	199,337	+132,848	51.47	+40.80	101,826	-6,858	26.29	+8.84	54,410	-302,538	14.05	-43.26	15,794	-57,461	4.08	-7.68	15,900	-1,524	4.11	+1.55	387,267	-235,533

== Aftermath ==
The Bolshevik victory in the District Duma election contributed to the decline of political power of the Moscow City Duma. As the newly elected District Dumas gathered, the Bolshevik deputies participated in a unified and disciplined way.

- Ahead of the opening of the Myasnitsko-Yauzsky District Duma, the Bolsheviks called of the SRs to form a socialist bloc in the District Duma. The SRs demanded that the Kadets be included in the bloc, a proposition that the Bolsheviks rejected. The SRs and Kadets formed a majority bloc, in which the SRs got the Duma chairman post and one of the members of the Myasnitsko-Yauzsky District Administration.
- The Kaluzhsky District Duma elected the Old Bolshevik Mikhail Olminsky as its chairman. The Bolshevik Boris Volin (Fradkin) was named as chairman of the Kaluzhsky District Administration and Pyotr Arutyunyants was named as its secretary. The Bolsheviks Konstantin Ostrovityanov, Artemic Khalatov and S. P. Kirillov were named as members of the Kaluzhsky District Administration.
- The Pyatnitsky District Duma elected the Bolshevik Mikhail Vladimirsky as its chairman. The Bolshevik Nikolai Semashko was named chairman of the Pyatnitsky District Administration. The Bolshevik Anna Weisman and Bernard Zaks of the Social Democracy of the Kingdom of Poland and Lithuania were named the members of Pyatnitsky District Administration.
- The Simonovsky District Duma would appoint the Bolshevik Nikolai Goncharov as the chairman of the District Administration.
- In the Rogozhsky District, the District Duma named one of its deputies, the Bolshevik Piskarev, as the chairman of the Rogozhsky District Administration.
- The Sokolnichesky District Duma appointed the Bolshevik Ivan Rusakov as the chairman of the District Administration. The Bolshevik Dominik Yefremov was named as a member of the District Administration.
- Samuil Vulfson chaired the Bolshevik faction in the Lefortovo District Duma.
- The Alekseevsky District Duma elected the Bolshevik factory worker Oto Vērzemnieks as its chairman.
- In the Meshchansky District Duma, the SRs and Kadets formed a majority bloc, and elected the justice of the peace and Kadet District Duma deputy N. N. Andreyev as the District Duma Chairman.
- The Sushchevsky-Mar'insky District Duma elected the Bolshevik I. G. Batyshev (metal worker, board member of the Metal Workers Union and chairman of the factory committee at the Military Artillery Plant) as its chairman. The Bolshevik M. V. Kamarinets was named chairman of the Sushchevsky-Mar'insky District Administration. The Bolsheviks G. P. Uspensky and Samuil Filler were named members of the District Administration.
- The Butyrsky District Duma elected the Bolshevik Grigory Usievich as its chairman. The Bolshevik Minaev was named chairman of the Butyrsky District Administration.
- The Petrovsky District Duma elected the Bolshevik A. E. Lisitsyn as its chairman. The Bolshevik Yefim Afonin was named chairman of the Petrovsky District Administration.
- The Presnansky District Duma elected the Bolshevik Vadim Podbelsky as its chairman. The Bolshevik Vasily Likhachev (Blas)) was named as chairman of the District Administration.
- In the Khamovnichesky District elected the Bolshevik Nikolai Klestov (Angarsky) as its chairman. The Bolshevik Zinovy Solovyov was named as the chairman of the Khamovnichesky District Administration.

On October 27 [O.S. October 14] 1917 the Council of District Dumas was constituted at the initiative of the Bolsheviks. The Council of District Dumas denounced the Moscow City Duma for 'taking the side of the counter-revolutionary bourgeoisie', and called for the building of an inter-district organization to challenge the power of City Duma. The District Dumas and the Council of District Dumas were abolished in March 1918, as the Moscow Soviet began to function as the sole city government.

Elwood (1976) argued that the 1917 Moscow District Duma elections "loom large in [Soviet] Russian historiography because Lenin attached so much importance to them and used them as proof that the time for the seizure of power had come, or, if you like, that a Bolshevik government would be, not only possible, but also legitimate, because it would have mass support in Petrograd and Moscow". A few days after the election, Lenin wrote the article This Crisis Has Matured, in which he stated that the "vote in the elections to the district dumas in Moscow is in general one of the most striking symptoms of the profound change which has taken place in the mood of the whole nation. [...] There can be no shadow of doubt that we, together with the Left Socialist-Revolutionaries, now have a majority in the Soviets, in the army, and in the country." Trotsky would later write that "throughout all these [municipal] elections there appears like a red thread one unchanging fact: the growth of the Bolsheviks. The elections to the district dumas of Moscow astonished the country especially with the sharp change they indicated in the mood of the masses." In 1933 Osip Piatnitsky wrote in Communist International that "[t]he sharpening of the revolutionary crisis and the drift of the proletarian and semi-proletarian masses of Moscow in the direction of Bolshevism were revealed most strikingly during the municipal elections to the district dumas held on September 24. [...] The elections to the district dumas revealed a particularly striking change of sentiment amongst the soldier masses, 90 per cent of whose votes were given to the Bolsheviks. This shift among the soldiers, which was a direct result of agitation and organisation, carried out, despite all obstacles, in the garrisons by the Military Bureau of the Bolshevik Party, reflected at the same time the growing revolutionary sentiments amongst the toiling masses of the peasantry".

The Kadets also framed the Moscow District Duma elections as a victory for their party, as they had routed their moderate socialist opponents. The Kadets saw the low electoral participation as an indication of the seriousness of the national problems Russia were facing, whereby the populace would be preoccupied with other matters than municipal politics.

Effectively, the local governance reform that the District Duma elections were supposed to produce was never fully implemented. The Moscow City Duma, dominated by the now routed Socialist-Revolutionaries, blocked all attempts to formalize the legislative powers or transfer funds to the newly elected District Dumas. After the October Revolution the Moscow City Duma and the District Dumas would be abolished. In the November 1917 Constituent Assembly election in Moscow the Bolsheviks obtained 366,148 votes (47.88%) and the Kadets 263,859 votes (34.50%).
