= Council of District Dumas =

Local government body in Moscow (1917–1918)

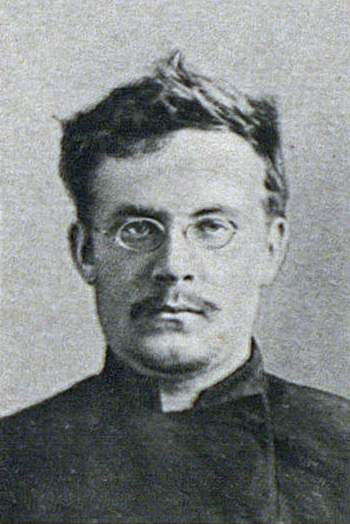
Mikhail Vladimirsky, chairman of the Council of District Dumas

The Council of District Dumas (Russian: Совет районных дум, romanized: Sovet rayonnykh dum, abbreviated SRD) was an institution which, following the October Revolution, functioned from October 1917 to March 1918 as the city government of Moscow. During its tumultuous existence, the Council of District Dumas attempted to revive the municipal governance of the city, but struggled with financial difficulties and a protracted strike movement by city administration employees. The Council and its executive were chaired by the Bolshevik leader Mikhail Vladimirsky.

== Background ==
Elections to District Dumas were held on October 7, 1917, whereby 17 Moscow district dumas (local municipal assemblies) were elected. The Bolshevik Party won a majority of seats in eleven district dumas and a plurality of seats in another three district dumas, whilst the Party of Socialist-Revolutionaries (SR) that had won the June 1917 Moscow City Duma election did not win a single district.

On October 10, 1917, the Moscow City Duma issued instructions for the formation of a Council of Representatives of District Dumas, which awarded a very narrow set of mandates to the Council – on one hand limited to coordinating the work of district administration and on the other hand that all resolutions issued by the Council needed to be approved by the Moscow City Duma.

On November 4, 1917, a provisional council of Bolshevik commissars (including Boris Weisbrod, Mikhail Vladimirsky, Vladimir Obukh and Aleksei Nikitin) was set up under the Moscow Military Revolutionary Committee (VRK), tasked to handle the affairs of Moscow municipal governance and city finances. On November 5, 1917, the VRK declared the SR-dominated Moscow City Duma dissolved. On November 7, 1917, the VRK announced that fresh elections for a new Moscow City Duma would be held on November 26, 1917.

== Foundation of the Council of District Dumas ==
By November 8, 1917, the VRK changed its mind, and decided that instead of electing a new City Duma the role of city governance would be taken over by a Council of District Dumas with a Bureau as its executive organ. On November 9, 1917, some 300 District Duma deputies gathered at the Sukharev People's Palace. The meeting took place at the same time as the ultimatum of the Commander of the Moscow Military District Konstantin Ryabtsev. Representatives of the VRK rushed the site to inform the meeting participants about the Ryabtsev ultimatum. When the meeting opened at 6:30 p.m. Kadet Party politician Prince Dmitry Shakhovskoy requested to speak and stated to the assembly that all District Duma deputies had not been properly informed and that thus the meeting lacked legitimacy. Shakhovskoy's statement provoked strong reactions from the floor, and he was pressured to retract his comment.

Following Shakhovskoy's intervention, the chairman of the meeting tried to read out a draft resolution, but he was constantly interrupted by protests from the Kadet and SR deputies in attendance. The draft resolution consisted of five points,

1. To express complete confidence in the Moscow Military Revolutionary Committee as the sole local organ of government.
2. Immediately to organise a Joint Council of District Dumas to consist of two members from each District Duma and one from each [District] administration.
3. The Council was to elect from its own number an Executive Revolutionary Bureau of seven members.
4. To instruct the Bureau immediately to draft measures concerning food distribution and supply, city finances, and the maintenance of revolutionary order in Moscow and its environs.
5. These draft measures, after endorsement by the Joint Council, are to be submitted to the Moscow Military Revolutionary Committee and enforced at once.

A motion to vote on this proposal without debate provoked further protests from the Kadets and SRs, with one deputy demanding to be allowed to speak. The VRK member Vladimirsky seized the podium and reminded the meeting participants that Ryabtsev had issued an ultimatum to the VRK to dissolve and that the shelling by the counter-revolutionary forces against the VRK had already begun. He asked that all discussions be halted and that the Bolsheviks should return to their district and prepare for emergency measures. After Vladimirsky's address the Kadet, SR and Menshevik deputies left the venue in protest. The remaining meeting participants, overwhelmingly Bolsheviks, then voted in favour of adopting the resolution. 213 votes were cast in favour of the resolution. Once the vote was over the meeting participants hastened to return to their respective districts.

The Council of District Dumas had 39 members, representing 13 out of the 17 districts of the city. Contrary to the instructions of the Moscow City Duma (which outlined that there should have been 12 representatives of the Moscow City Duma and the central city administration in the Council of District Dumas) no seats on the Council were given to the Moscow City Duma nor the central city administration.

== Bureau of District Dumas ==
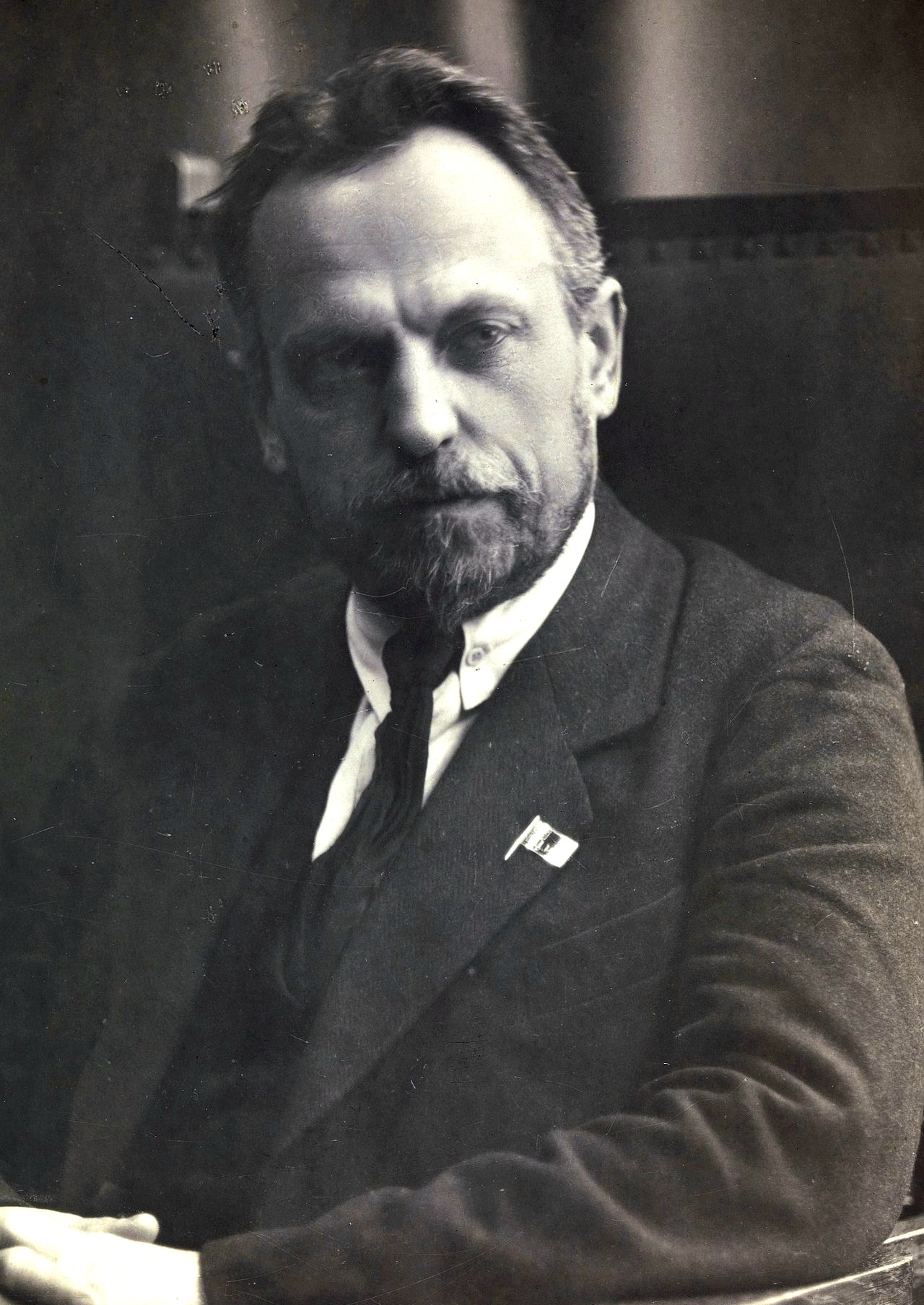
Nikolai Semashko, Head of the Health Department

The Council of District Dumas in turn elected a 18-member Bureau to function as its executive organ. Nine of the eighteen Bureau members were named as head of departments. Vladimirsky was elected as the chairman of both the Council of District Dumas and its Bureau. Obukh was named as the Head of the Social Security Department. The chairman of the Petrovsky District Administration, Yefim Afonin, was named as Head of the Financial Department. The physician and recent commissar of the City Duma, Nikolai Semashko was named Head of the Health Department. Aleksandr Piskunov was named as Head of the Public Education Department. Anna Weisman was appointed as Head of the Fuel Department. The chairman of the Simonovsky District Administration Nikolai Goncharov was named Head of the Departments for Refugees, City Lands and Rental Units. The engineer Pavel Mostovenko was named Head of the Department of City Enterprises. The chairman of the Presnensky District Administration and former secretary of the Moscow Committee of the Bolshevik Party Vasily Likhachev (Blas) was named Head of the Affairs of the Former 8th Department (in charge of fire brigades, police and military barracks). The chairman of the Kaluzhsky District Administration and former member of the Municipal Commission of the Moscow Committee of the Bolshevik Party Josef Fradkin (Boris Volin) was named Head of the Department for District Administrations.

The Bureau also included the Chairman of the Sushchevsko-Mar'insky District Administration M.V. Kamarinets and Aleksei Nikitin. Representatives of the Central Union of City Workers and Employees (V. I. Samarin, G. A. Piskarev, A. A. Andryushin, A. N. Teleshov, N. A. Ludanov and D. F. Tomkevich) were included given seats in the Bureau.

A later addition to the Bureau was Grigory Shklovsky, who was named Deputy Head of the Department of City Enterprises. E. A. Shneerson held the post of Secretary of the Bureau throughout its existence.

== One city, two municipal governments ==
Effectively there were now two competing municipal governments in Moscow: the SR-dominated Moscow City Duma and the Bolshevik-dominated Council of District Dumas. The Moscow City Duma had significant funds at its disposal, which it refused to share with the Council of District Dumas. The Moscow City Duma blocked any moves to allow for provision of loans for the District Dumas to begin operating. At a meeting of the Moscow City Duma (which rejected the legitimacy of the VRK order for it to dissolve) on November 22, 1917 the deputy mayor I. N. Kovarsky argued that the Council of District Dumas represented only 84 Bolshevik District Duma deputies.

The Council of District Dumas primarily focused on economic matters of urban governance. On November 27, 1917, the Presidium of the Moscow Soviet of Workers and Soldiers Deputies granted the Bureau of the Council of District Dumas full autonomy regarding issues pertaining to the municipal finances. The opposition parties, on the other hand, boycotted the Council of District Dumas.

Whilst the Moscow City Duma and the Council of District Dumas competed over the running of city affairs, there were also difficulties in defining the delimitation of the roles between of the Moscow Soviet and the Council of District Dumas, as well as between the roles of the District Dumas and District Soviets. To a large extent this problem arose from a lack of clarity regarding the supposed roles of the District Dumas. Whilst the Council of District Dumas and the Moscow Soviet had friendly relations and actively cooperated, at times the Council of District Dumas reminded the Moscow Soviet regarding the delimitation of powers of local self-government and state power.

== Financial difficulties ==
The financial resources at the disposal to the Council of District Dumas was far short of the requirements to run a city government. One of the first plans of the Council of District Dumas to solve their money shortage was to seize a railway car stacked with safes holding private bank deposits. However, the VRK rejected the plan. The Council of District Dumas then began to expropriate funds from the Moscow Headquarters of the State Bank, in a first move with Vladmirsky himself led an armed squad that stormed the bank and seized about a million rubles. By January 1, 1918, the Council of District Dumas had reportedly confiscated some 38 million rubles. The Council of District Dumas also received funds from loans, central government subsidies, the accounts of the All-Russian Union of Towns and imposing new taxes.

Over time the Council of District Dumas became more and more functional. The Department of City Enterprises became active in November–December 1917 and became one of the most important agencies of the Council of District Dumas.

The Council of District Dumas tried to increase tax incomes, but tax collected did not match expenditures. In March 1918, the gas fee was raised from 10 to 18 rubles per 100 cubic feet and the fee for water went up to 6.5 rubles per 1000 buckets. Likewise the fee for the restaurant industry was increased 5 times.

== City employees strike ==
About a week prior to the constitution of the Council of District Dumas, the majority of white collar employees of the Moscow City Duma had initiated a strike over pay and procedures. A large section of the white collar employees did not recognize the authority of the Council of District Dumas, and prolonged their strike action. In mid-November 1917, the Moscow City Duma mayor Vadim Rudnev announced all employees received full salaries for the time they had been on strike and that those employees fired by the VRK would be reinstated. Many employees returned to their posts, but in the eyes of Vladimirsky the returning officers were engaged in a go-slow action refusing to carry out their duties. In December 1917 Vladimirsky dismissed all those employees and conditioned re-employment with a signature of a loyalty oath.

Various repressive measures were used against the striking city employees – arrests, searches, trial by revolutionary tribunals, evictions from service apartments, deprivation of the right to ride on the front section on trams. On the other hand, commitments for benefits and salary increases were made for to motivate employees to abandon the strike. By February 1918, the strike movement fizzled out, and the city employees were now willing to abandon any political slogans against the Bolsheviks. However, by this juncture the Council of District Dumas was no longer interested in re-incorporating strike participants as many posts had already been filled by other individuals. In March 1918, the strike movement was called off without any conditions. The outcome of the strike strengthened the position of the Council of District Dumas.

== Housing policy ==
In November 1917 the Council of District Dumas and the Moscow Soviet began to apply a common housing policy, taking over the management of housing committees (which would exist in all buildings) and regulating relations between landlords and tenants. On November 29, 1917 the Presidium of the Moscow Soviet issued a mandatory decree on the municipalization of real estate. Rents would now be collected by housing committees, rather than landlords. The housing committees could keep up to half of the collected rents for the upkeep of the building whilst the remainder would the given to the Council of District Dumas. A housing commission was set up under the Council of District Dumas in December 1917, and district housing councils were set up under each District Duma.

In the midst of a sense of increasing lawlessness, some housing committees began forming local crime-fighting squads. The Council of District Dumas and the Moscow Soviet rejected such moves.

== District Dumas abolished ==
By mid-January 1918, the central government adopted a policy that sought to merge the old municipal administrations with soviets. This shift provoked a debate on the future of local governance in Soviet Russia. A section of the Bolshevik Party (like the People's Commissar for Self-Government Vladimir Trutovsky) as well as the Party of Left Socialist-Revolutionaries (internationalists) favoured retaining the old municipalities within the Soviet fold. Another section of the Bolshevik Party advocated abolishing the old municipalities altogether. The latter line prevailed and on March 20, 1918, the People's Comissariat of Self-Government was abolished.

On January 24, 1918, the Moscow Soviet dispersed the Alekseevsky District Duma (where the Bolsheviks constituted a minority faction. The Alekseevsky District Duma affair prompted a debate at a joint session of the Moscow Committee of the Bolshevik Party and the Bolshevik faction in the Moscow Soviet Executive on January 29, 1918, which ended with a resolution from the meeting calling for the merger of the Moscow Soviet and the Council of District Dumas. On February 21, 1918, the Presidium of the Moscow Soviet issued a resolution endorsing a merger of the two entities.

On March 18, 1918, the Council of District Dumas adopted a resolution which laid out that the Council would be dissolved and its functioned overtaken by a new Soviet of City Services. This proposed Soviet of City Services would be attached to the Moscow Soviet, its board would be appointed by the latter but it would operate autonomously in the running of municipal affairs. On March 29, 1918, a joint meeting of the Council of District Dumas and chairmen of district soviets adopted a new resolution, put forth by Vladimirsky, which affirmed that all management of municipal affairs would be handled over to the Moscow Soviet without any mentions of a Soviet of City Services. The resolution was passed with 14 votes in favour and 8 votes against.

On April 25, 1918, the Council of District Dumas ceased to exist, and the Moscow Soviet took over all aspects of municipal governance of the city. In one of its last decisions in April 1918, the Council of District Dumas decided to remove old Czarist names of various streets and squares in the city. The name changes were effective from May 1, 1918, and included renaming Resurrection Square as Revolution Square, Old Basmannaya Street as Karl Marx Street, Skobelev Square as Sovetskaya Square, and Catherine Square as Commune Square.
