= Alexey Nikitin =

Alexey Nikitin may refer to:

- Aleksei Nikitin, Russian footballer
- Alexey Nikitin (politician), Russian politician
- Aleksei Nikitin (revolutionary) (1870–1938), Russian Bolshevik revolutionary
