= Anna Weisman =

Russian Bolshevik revolutionary (1875–1942)

Anna Ilyinichna Weisman (Russian: Анна Ильинична Вейсман, 1875–1942) was a Russian Bolshevik revolutionary. A paramedic and teacher by profession, she was active in the underground revolutionary movement in southern Russia and Moscow during the Czarist period. In the wake of the October Revolution she served in municipal government roles in Moscow.

== Youth and entry into politics ==
Weisman was born into a bourgeois family in Bakhmut, Yekaterinoslav Governorate, in 1875. She worked as a teacher and librarian in Armavir and Maikop from 1895. As of 1901 Weisman studied at a paramedic course in Saratov. In Saratov she came into contact with the Russian Social Democratic Labour Party. In 1902 she smuggled literature and printing fonts to help establish an underground printing house in Saratov. After completing her studies, she worked as a paramedic in Maikop. In Maikop she distributed revolutionary literature and conducted propaganda work at an oil mill. In 1906 she joined the Russian Social Democratic Labour Party, and was a member of the Bolshevik faction. Soviet playwright Evgeny Schwartz recalled in his memoirs that around the time of the 1906 State Duma election, he saw Weisman speaking at a rally in Maikop, coming directly from the hospital in her white uniform, speaking calmly, and calling to raise the issue of women's rights in the State Duma electoral struggle.

== In the underground ==
In 1906 Weisman fled from Maikop, where she was facing arrest, and went to Moscow. In Moscow she worked at the city government. She was part of the Moscow Regional Bureau of the Russian Social Democratic Labour Party, and help organize the underground organization of the movement (such as conducting encrypted correspondence, organizing safe houses, fundraising). In 1910 Bolshevik leader Iosif Dubrovinsky was arrested in her apartment, after which Weisman was arrested and exiled from Moscow for three years. She moved to a place near Kharkov, but later returned (illegally) to Moscow where she stayed near the Losinoostrovskaya railway station.

== October Revolution and Moscow municipal government ==
After the 1917 Moscow District Duma elections, Weisman became a member of the Pyatnitsky District Administration. In early November 1917 the Moscow Military Revolutionary Committee dissolved the Moscow City Duma and announced that a provisional 4-member council would govern municipal affairs of the city, with Weisman as its secretary. In the Council of District Dumas, an institution set up by the Bolsheviks to function as the city municipal government in lieu of the dissolved Moscow City Duma, Weisman was a member of its Bureau (executive organ of municipal government) and was named Head of the Fuel Department. After the Council of City Dumas was dissolved and its municipal government functions overtaken by the Moscow Soviet, Weisman served as Head of the Second Economic Department of the Moscow Soviet from April 25, 1918, to July 19, 1918, and then again from August 31, 1918, to December 3, 1918. She served as Head of the Fuel Department of the Moscow Soviet from September 12, 1918, to January 4, 1919.

== Later period ==
As of 1932 she was a member of the Moscow Section of the All-Union Society of Old Bolsheviks. Weisman died in 1942.
