= History of Moscow =

Historical affiliations

Vyatichi (until 1147)
Kievan Rus' (1147–1238)
∟ city and fortress destroyed during the Mongol siege (1238)
Golden Horde (1238–1263)
Grand Principality of Moscow (1263–1547)
∟ tributary to the Golden Horde / Great Horde under the Tatar yoke until the Great Stand on the Ugra (1480)
∟ suburbs burned and temporary tributary status signed during the Crimean raid (1521)
Tsardom of Russia (1547–1610)
∟ city completely destroyed by fire during the Crimean raid (1571)
Polish–Lithuanian Commonwealth occupation (1610–1612)
Tsardom of Russia (1612–1721)
Russian Empire (1721–1812)
First French Empire occupation (1812)
Russian Empire (1812–1917)
Russian Republic (1917)
Russian Soviet Federative Socialist Republic (1917–1922)
Soviet Union (1922–1991)
Russia (since 1991)

The city of Moscow gradually grew around the Moscow Kremlin, beginning in the 14th century. It was the capital of the Grand Duchy of Moscow (or Muscovy) and then the Tsardom of Russia until the capital was moved to Saint Petersburg by Peter the Great. Moscow was the capital of the Russian Soviet Federative Socialist Republic from 1918, which then became the Soviet Union (1922 to 1991), and since 1991 has served as capital of the Russian Federation.

Situated on either bank of the eponymous Moskva River, the city during the 16th to 17th centuries grew up in five concentric divisions, formerly separated from one another by walls: the Kremlin ("fortress"), Kitaigorod ("walled town", but interpreted as "Chinatown" by folk etymology), Bielygorod ("white town"), Zemlianoigorod ("earthworks town"), and Miestchanskygorod ("bourgeois town") outside the city walls.

After the fire of 1812, the city ramparts were replaced with the Boulevard Ring and Garden Ring roads, replacing the walls around Bielygorod and Zemlianoigorod, respectively. The city's population grew from 250,000 to over a million in the 19th century, and from one to ten million in the 20th century, putting it among the top twenty of the world's most populous cities today.

The modern coat of arms of Moscow (adopted 2000) shows Saint George and the Dragon, based on a heraldic tradition originating in the 11th century with Yaroslav I of Kiev and adopted by the leader of Vladimir-Suzdal in the 12th century (Alexander Nevsky) and eventually by Muscovy in the 14th century (Dmitry Donskoy).

== Prehistory ==
The oldest evidence of humans on the territory of Moscow dates from the Neolithic Schukinskaya site on the Moscow River. Within the modern bounds of the city other late evidence was discovered to be a burial ground of the Fatyanovskaya culture, as well as the site of an Iron Age settlement of the Dyakovo culture, on the territory of the Kremlin, Sparrow Hills, Setun River and Kuntsevskiy forest park, etc.

The name of the city is thought to be derived from the name of the Moskva River. There have been proposed several theories of the origin of the name of the river. Finnic Merya and Muroma people, who were among the several pre-Slavic tribes which originally inhabited the area, called the river supposedly Mustajoki, in English: Black river. It has been suggested that the name of the city derives from this term.

In the 9th century, the Oka River was part of the Volga trade route, and the upper Volga watershed became an area of contact between the indigenous Uralic peoples such as the Merya and the expanding Turkic (Volga Bulgars), Germanic (Varangians) and Slavic peoples.

The earliest East Slavic tribes recorded as having expanded to the upper Volga in the 9th to 10th centuries are the Vyatichi and Krivichi. The Moskva River was incorporated as part of Rostov-Suzdal into the Kievan Rus in the 11th century. By CE 1100, a minor settlement had appeared on the mouth of the Neglinnaya River.

== Early history (1147–1283) ==
The first reference to Moscow dates from 1147 as a meeting place of Sviatoslav Olgovich and Yuri Dolgorukiy. At the time it was a minor town on the western border of Vladimir-Suzdal Principality.

In 1156, Kniaz Yury Dolgoruky fortified the town with a timber fence and a moat. In the course of the Mongol invasion of Rus, the Golden Horde burned the city to the ground and killed its inhabitants.

The timber fort na Moskvě "on the Moscow river" was inherited by Daniel, the youngest son of Alexander Nevsky, in the 1260s, at the time considered the least valuable of his father's possessions. Daniel was still a child at the time, and the fort was governed by tiuns (deputies), appointed by Daniel's paternal uncle, Yaroslav of Tver.

Daniel came of age in the 1270s and became involved in the power struggles of the principality with lasting success, siding with his brother Dmitry in his bid for the rule of Novgorod. From 1283 he acted as the ruler of an independent principality alongside Dmitry, who became Grand Duke of Vladimir. Daniel has been credited with founding the first Moscow monasteries, dedicated to the Lord's Epiphany and to Saint Daniel.

== Grand Duchy (1283–1547) ==
Daniel ruled Moscow as Grand Duke until 1303 and established it as a prosperous city which would eventually eclipse its parent principality of Vladimir by the 1320s.

In 1282 Daniel founded the first monastery of Moscow on the right bank of the Moskva River, the wooden church of St. Daniel-Stylite. It is now known as the Danilov Monastery. Daniel died in 1303, at the age of 42. Before his death he became a monk and, according to his will, was buried in the cemetery of the St. Daniel Monastery.

Moscow was stable and prosperous for many years and attracted a large numbers of refugees from across Russia. The Rurikids maintained large landholdings by practicing primogeniture, whereby all land was passed to the eldest sons, rather than dividing it up among all sons. By 1304, Yury of Moscow contested with Mikhail of Tver for the throne of the principality of Vladimir. Ivan I eventually defeated Tver to become the sole collector of taxes for the Mongol rulers, making Moscow the capital of Vladimir-Suzdal. By paying high tribute, Ivan won an important concession from the Khan.

While the Khan of the Golden Horde initially attempted to limit Moscow's influence, when the growth of the Grand Duchy of Lithuania began to threaten all of Russia, the Khan strengthened Moscow to counterbalance Lithuania, allowing it to become one of the most powerful cities in Russia. In 1380, prince Dmitry Donskoy of Moscow led a united Russian army to an important victory over the Mongols in the Battle of Kulikovo. Afterwards, Moscow took the leading role in liberating Russia from Mongol domination. In 1480, Ivan III had finally broken the Russians free from Tatar control and overthrew the Mongols. Moscow later became the capital of an empire that would eventually encompass all of Russia and Siberia, and parts of many other lands.

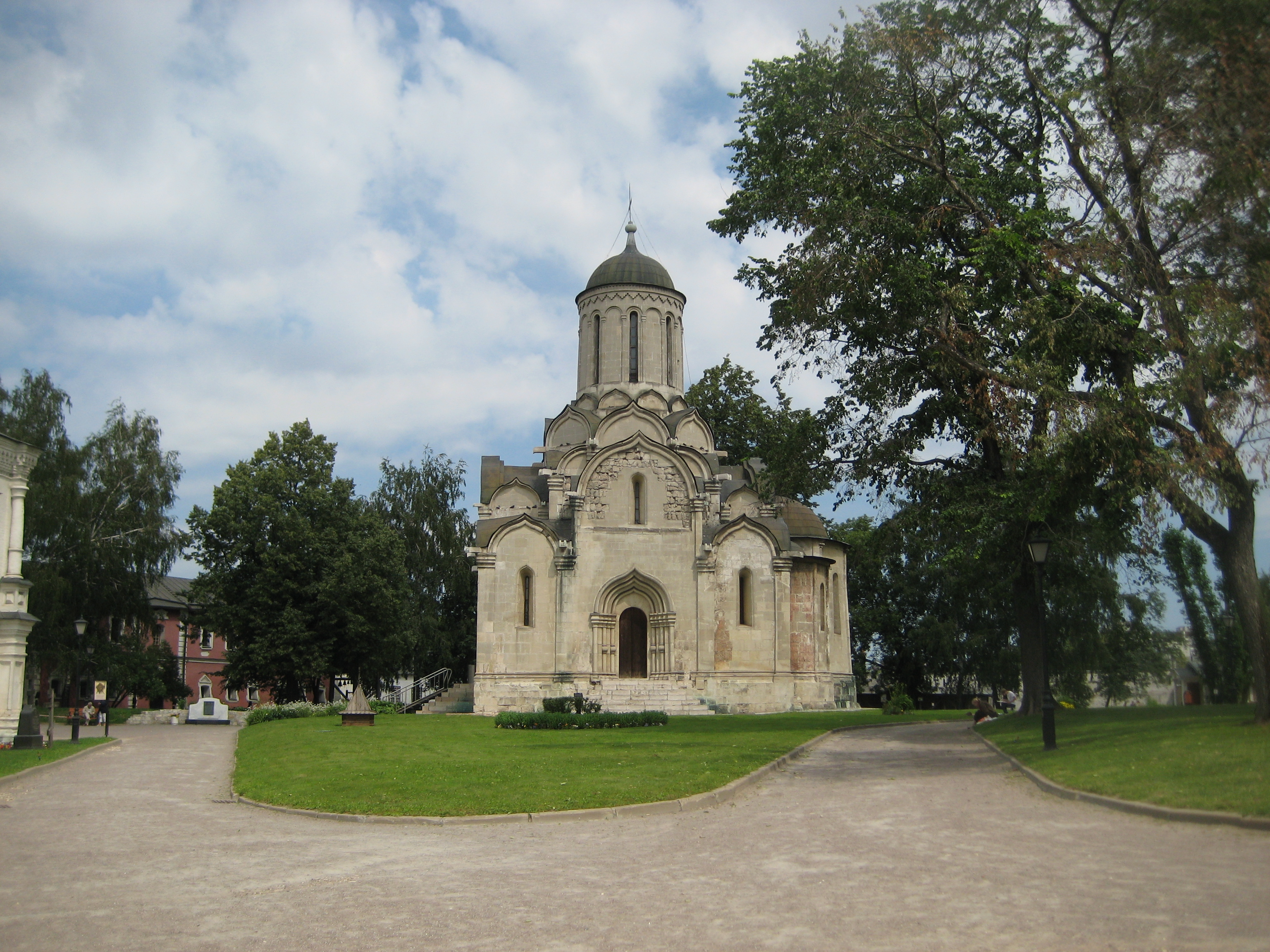
Church of the Holy Mandylion at Andronikov Monastery was built in the 15th century.

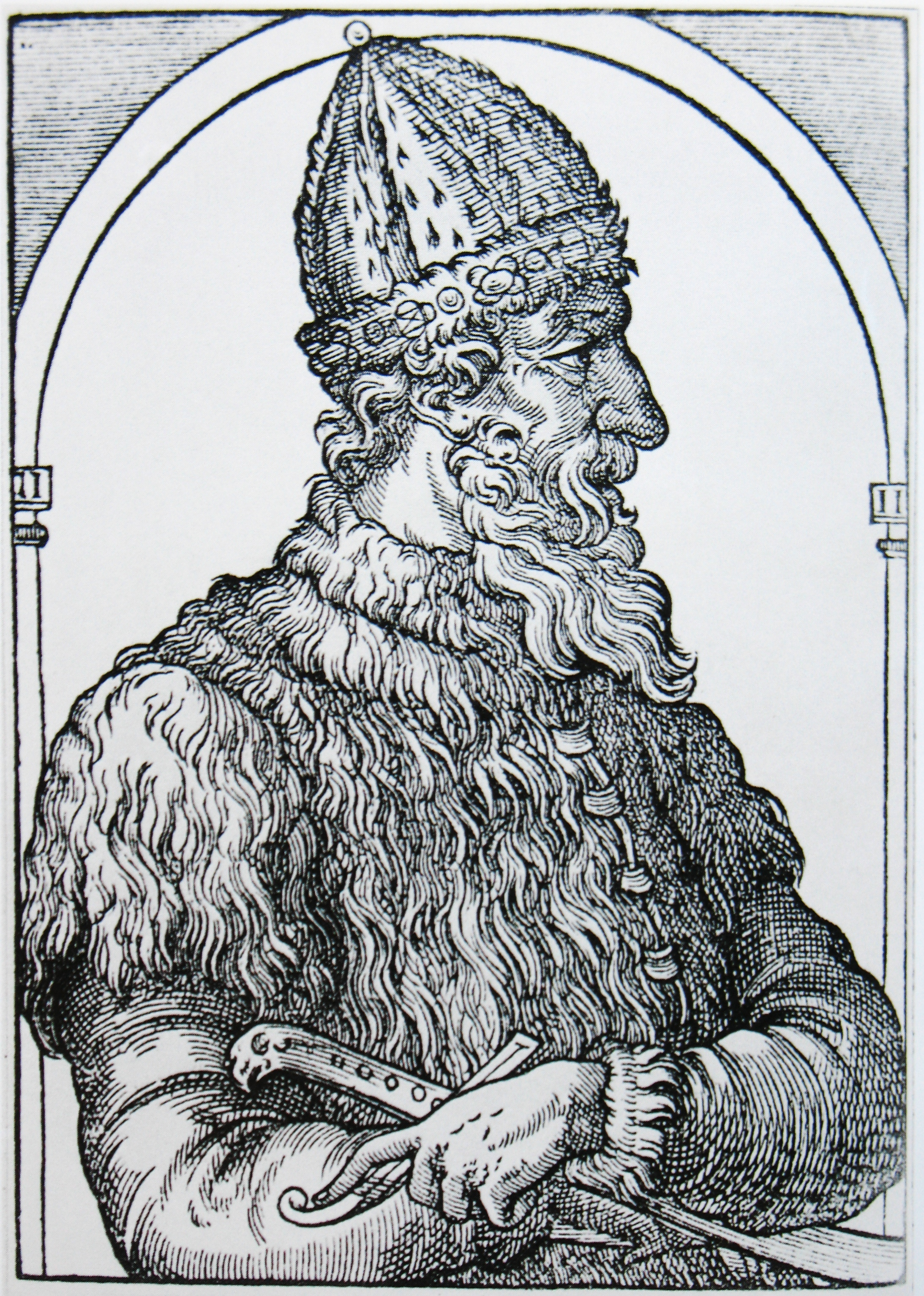
Ivan III

In 1462 Ivan III, known as Ivan the Great (1440–1505) became Grand Prince of Moscow (then part of the medieval Muscovy state). He began fighting the Tatars, enlarged the territory of Muscovy, and enriched his capital city. By 1500 it had a population of 100,000 and was one of the largest cities in the world. He conquered the far larger principality of Novgorod to the north, which had been allied to the hostile Lithuanians. By this conquest Ivan III enlarged his territory seven-fold, expanding from 430,000 to 2,800,000 square kilometers. He took control of the ancient "Novgorod Chronicle" and made it a propaganda vehicle for his regime.

The original Moscow Kremlin was built during the 14th century. It was reconstructed by Ivan, who in the 1480s invited architects from Italy, such as Petrus Antonius Solarius, who designed the new Kremlin wall and its towers, and Marco Ruffo who designed the new palace for the prince. The Kremlin walls as they now appear are those designed by Solarius, completed in 1495. The Kremlin's Great Bell Tower was built in 1505–08 and augmented to its present height in 1600. A trading settlement, or posad, grew up to the east of the Kremlin, in the area known as Zaradye (Зарядье). In the time of Ivan III, the Red Square, originally named the Hollow Field (Полое поле) appeared.

In 1508–1516, the Italian architect Aleviz Fryazin (Novy) arranged for the construction of a moat in front of the eastern wall, which would connect the Moskva and Neglinnaya and be filled in with water from Neglinnaya. This moat, known as the Alevizov moat, had a length of 541 meters, a width of 36 meters, and a depth of 9.5–13 m. It was lined with limestone and, in 1533, fenced on both sides with low, 4-meter-thick cogged brick walls.

== Tsardom (1547–1721) ==
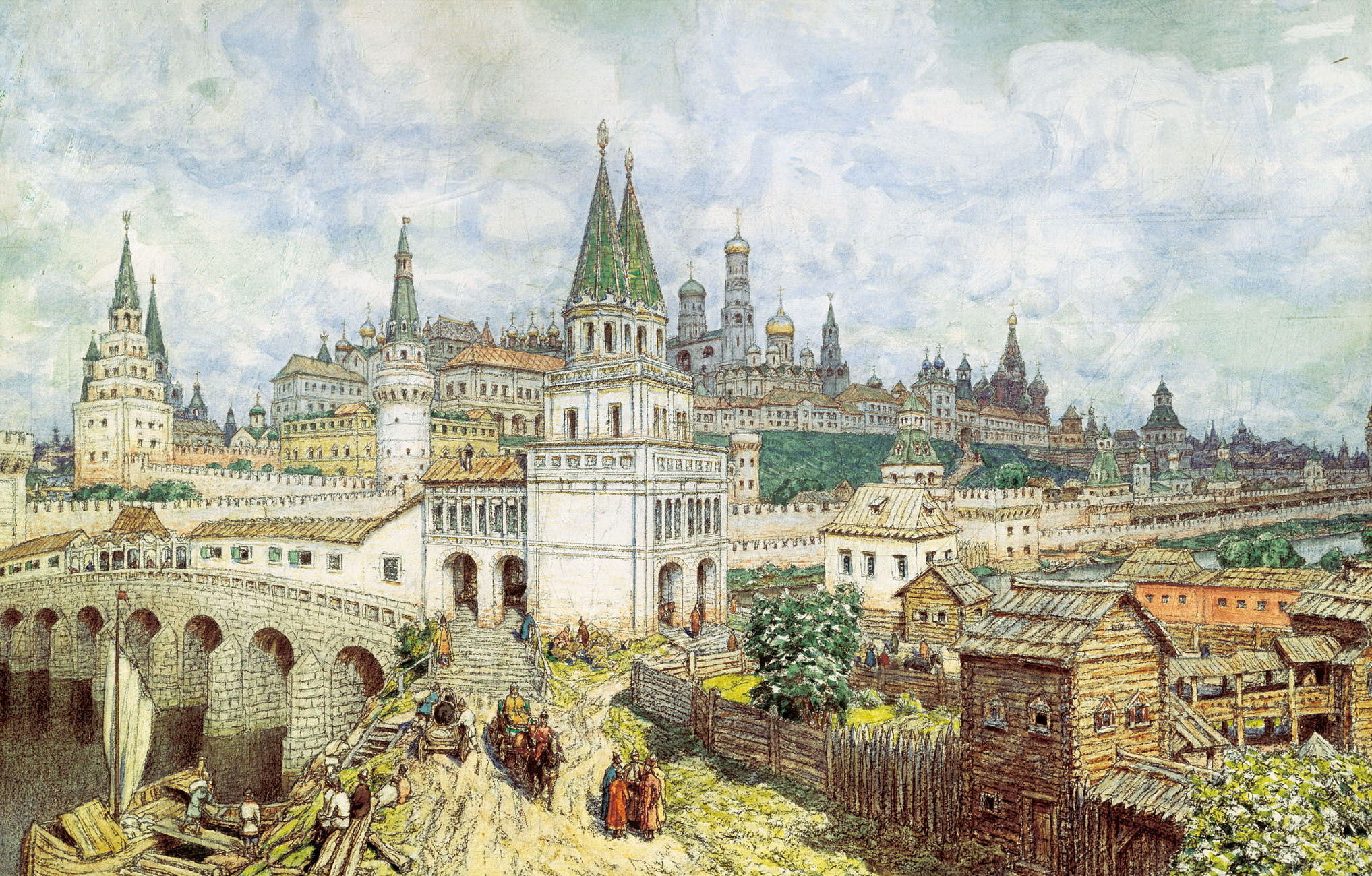
View of 17th-century Moscow (1922 drawing by Apollinary Vasnetsov)

In the 16th and 17th centuries, the three circular defenses were built: Kitay-gorod (Китай-город), the White City (Белый город) and the Earthen City (Земляной город). However, in 1547, two fires destroyed much of the town, and in 1571, the Crimean Tatars, supported by the Ottomans, burned down Moscow. The annals record that only 30,000 of 200,000 inhabitants survived.

The Crimean Tatars attacked again in 1591, but this time were held back by new defense walls, built between 1584 and 1591 by a craftsman named Fyodor Kon. In 1592, an outer earth rampart with 50 towers was erected around the city, including an area on the right bank of the Moscow River. As an outermost line of defense, a chain of strongly fortified monasteries was established beyond the ramparts to the south and east, principally the Novodevichy Convent and Donskoy, Danilov, Simonov, Novospasskiy, and Andronikov monasteries, most of which now house museums. From its ramparts, the city became poetically known as Bielokamennaya, the "White-Walled". The limits of the city as marked by the ramparts built in 1592 are now marked by the Garden Ring.

Map of Moscow by Adam Olearius in 1638

Three square gates existed on the eastern side of the Kremlin wall, which in the 17th century, were known as: Konstantino-Eleninsky, Spassky, Nikolsky (owing their names to the icons of Constantine and Helen, the Savior and St. Nicholas which hung over them). The last two were directly opposite the Red Square, while the Konstantino-Elenensky gate was located behind Saint Basil's Cathedral.

The Russian famine of 1601–1603 killed perhaps 100,000 in Moscow. From 1610 through 1612, troops of the Polish–Lithuanian Commonwealth occupied Moscow, as its ruler Sigismund III tried to take the Russian throne. In 1612, the people of Nizhny Novgorod and other Russian cities conducted by prince Dmitry Pozharsky and Kuzma Minin rose against the Polish-Lithuanian occupiers, besieged the Kremlin, and expelled them. In 1613, the Zemsky sobor elected Michael Romanov tsar, establishing the Romanov dynasty.

During the first half of the 17th century, the population of Moscow doubled from roughly 100,000 to 200,000. It expanded beyond its ramparts in the later 17th century. By 1682, there were 692 households established north of the ramparts, by Ukrainians and Belarusians abducted from their hometowns in the course of Russo-Polish War (1654–1667). These new outskirts of the city came to be known as the Meshchanskaya sloboda, after Ruthenian meshchane "town people". The term meshchane (мещане) acquired pejorative connotations in 18th-century Russia and today means "petty bourgeois" or "narrow-minded philistine".

The entire city of the late 17th century, including the slobodas which grew up outside of the city ramparts, are contained within what is today Moscow's Central Administrative Okrug.

Numerous disasters befell the city. The plague killed upwards of 80% of the people in 1654–55. Fires burned out much of the wooden city in 1626 and 1648.

== Empire (1721–1917) ==
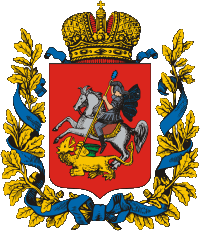
The coat of arms of Moscow Governorate

Moscow ceased to be Russia's capital (except for a brief period from 1728 to 1732 under the influence of the Supreme Privy Council) when Peter the Great moved his government to the newly built Saint Petersburg on the Baltic coast in 1712.

After losing the status as capital of the empire, the population of Moscow at first decreased, from 200,000 in the 17th century to 130,000 in 1750. But after 1750, the population grew more than tenfold over the remaining duration of the Russian Empire, reaching 1.8 million by 1915.

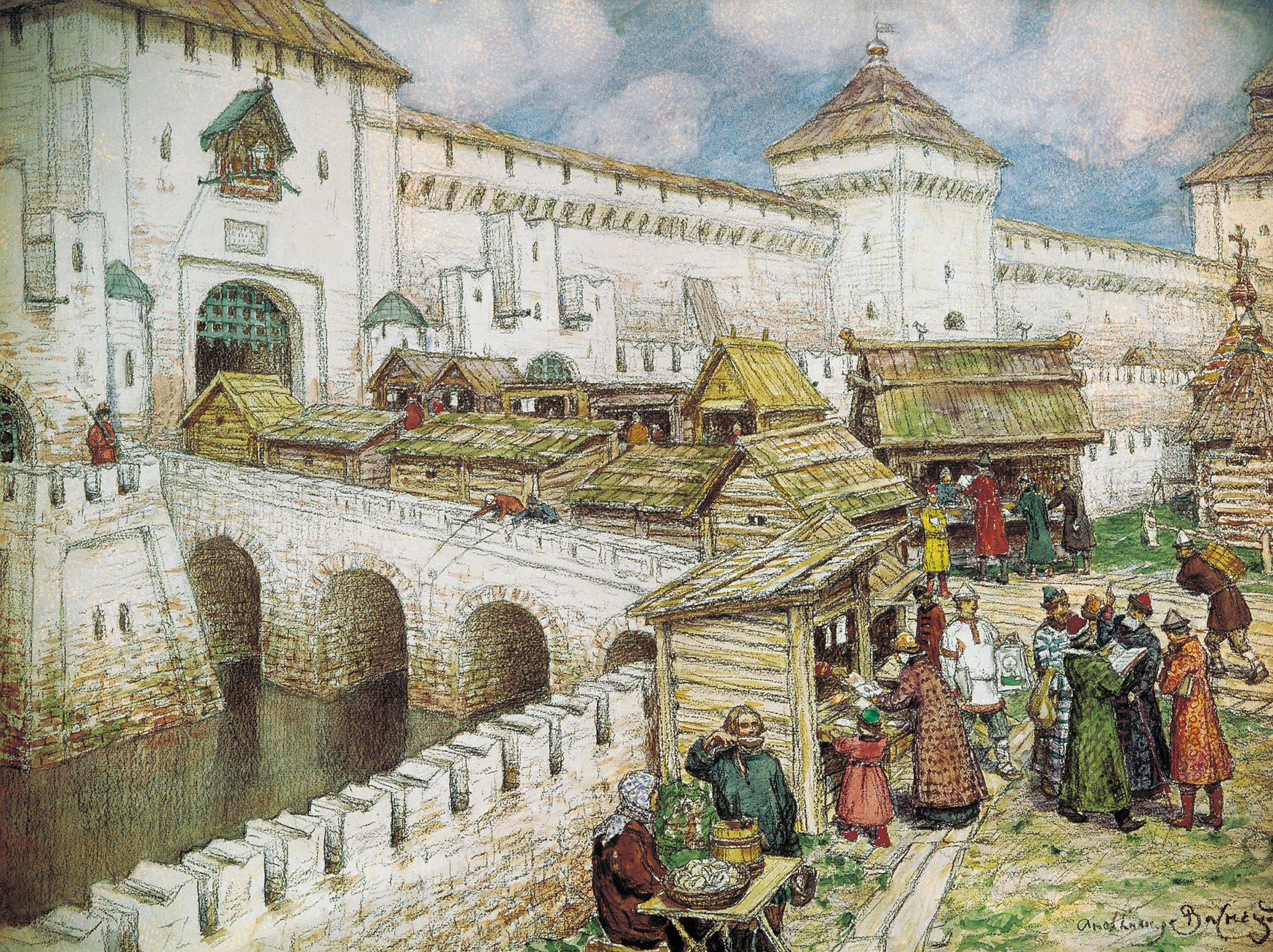
Book shops at the Spassky bridge, by Apollinary Vasnetsov

By 1700, the building of cobbled roads had begun. In November 1730, permanent street light was introduced, and by 1867 many streets were lit by gas. In 1883, near the Prechistinskiye Gates, arc lamps were installed. In 1741 Moscow was surrounded by a barricade 25 miles long, the Kamer-Kollezhsky rampart, with 16 gates at which customs tolls were collected. Its line is traced today by a number of streets called val (Russian: вал). Between 1781 and 1804 the Mytischinskiy water pipeline (the first in Russia) was built. In 1813 a Commission for the Construction of the City of Moscow was established. It launched a great program of rebuilding, including a partial replanning of the city-center. Among many buildings constructed or reconstructed at this time were the Grand Kremlin Palace and the Kremlin Armoury, the Moscow University, the Moscow Manege (Riding School), and the Bolshoi Theatre. In 1903 the Moskvoretskaya water pipeline began operations. In the early 19th century, the arch of the Konstantino-Eleninskaya Tower's gate was paved with bricks, but the Spasskaya Tower was the main front gate of the Kremlin and used for royal entrances. From this gate, wooden and (following the 17th-century improvements) stone bridges stretched across the moat. Books were sold on this bridge, and stone platforms (roskaty) were built nearby for guns. The Tsar Cannon was located on the platform of the Lobnoye mesto.

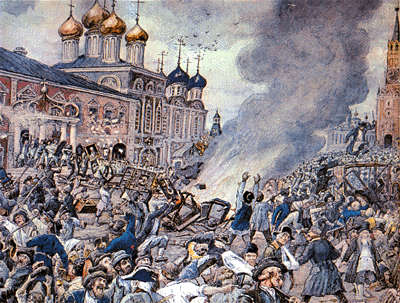
Moscow plague riot of 1771

The road connecting Moscow with St. Petersburg, now the M10 highway, was completed in 1746, its Moscow end following the old Tver road which had existed since the 16th century. It became known as Peterburskoye Schosse after it was paved in the 1780s. Petrovsky Palace was built in 1776–1780 by Matvey Kazakov as a railway station specifically reserved for royal journeys from Saint Petersburg to Moscow, while coaches for lesser classes arrived and departed from Vsekhsvyatskoye station.

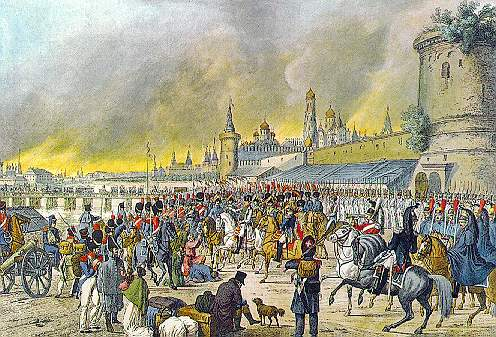
French troops in Moscow in 1812

When Napoleon invaded Russia in 1812, the Moscovites were evacuated. It is suspected today that the Moscow fire which ensued initially started as a result of Russian sabotage. In the fire's wake, an estimated three-quarters of the city lay in ruin.

Moscow State University was established in 1755. Its main building was reconstructed after the 1812 fire by Domenico Giliardi. The Moskovskiye Vedomosti newspaper appeared from 1756, originally in weekly intervals, and from 1859 as a daily newspaper.

The Arbat Street had been in existence since at least the 15th century, but it was developed into a prestigious area during the 18th century. It was destroyed in the fire of 1812 and was rebuilt completely in the early 19th century.

In the 1830s, general Alexander Bashilov planned the first regular grid of city streets north from Petrovsky Palace. Khodynka field south of the highway was used for military training. Smolensky Rail station (forerunner of present-day Belorussky Rail Terminal) was inaugurated in 1870. Sokolniki Park, in the 18th century the home of the tsar's falconers well outside of Moscow, became contiguous with the expanding city in the later 19th century and was developed into a public municipal park in 1878. The suburban Savyolovsky Rail Terminal was built in 1902.

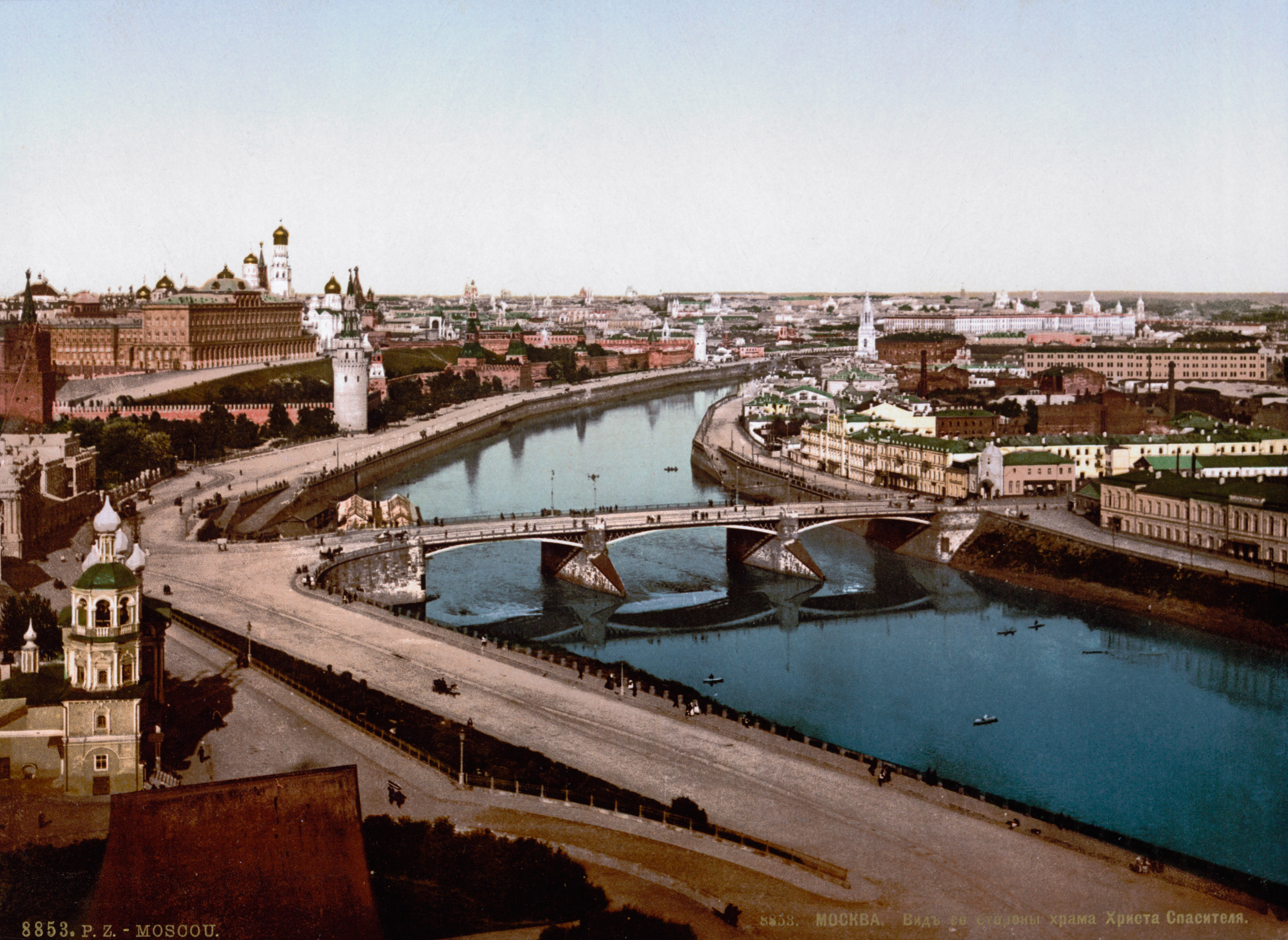
Moscow in late 19th century

In January 1905, the institution of the City Governor, or Mayor, was officially introduced in Moscow, and Alexander Adrianov became Moscow's first official mayor.

The 645-kilometer long railway between Moscow and Saint-Petersburg began operating in 1851. While technically it was not the first railway in Russia, its construction is generally seen as the beginning of the railway era in Russia. As railways grew in subsequent decades, Moscow served as the central railway hub of Russia.

When Catherine II came to power in 1762, the city's filth and smell of sewage was depicted by observers as a symptom of the disorderly lifestyles of lower-class Russians recently arrived from the farms. Elites called for improving sanitation, which became part of Catherine's plans for increasing control over social life. National political and military successes from 1812 through 1855 calmed the critics and validated efforts to produce a more enlightened and stable society. There was less talk about the smell and the poor conditions of public health. However, in the wake of Russia's failures in the Crimean War in 1855–56, confidence in the ability of the state to maintain order in the slums eroded, and demands for improved public health put filth back on the agenda.

== Soviet era (1917–1991) ==
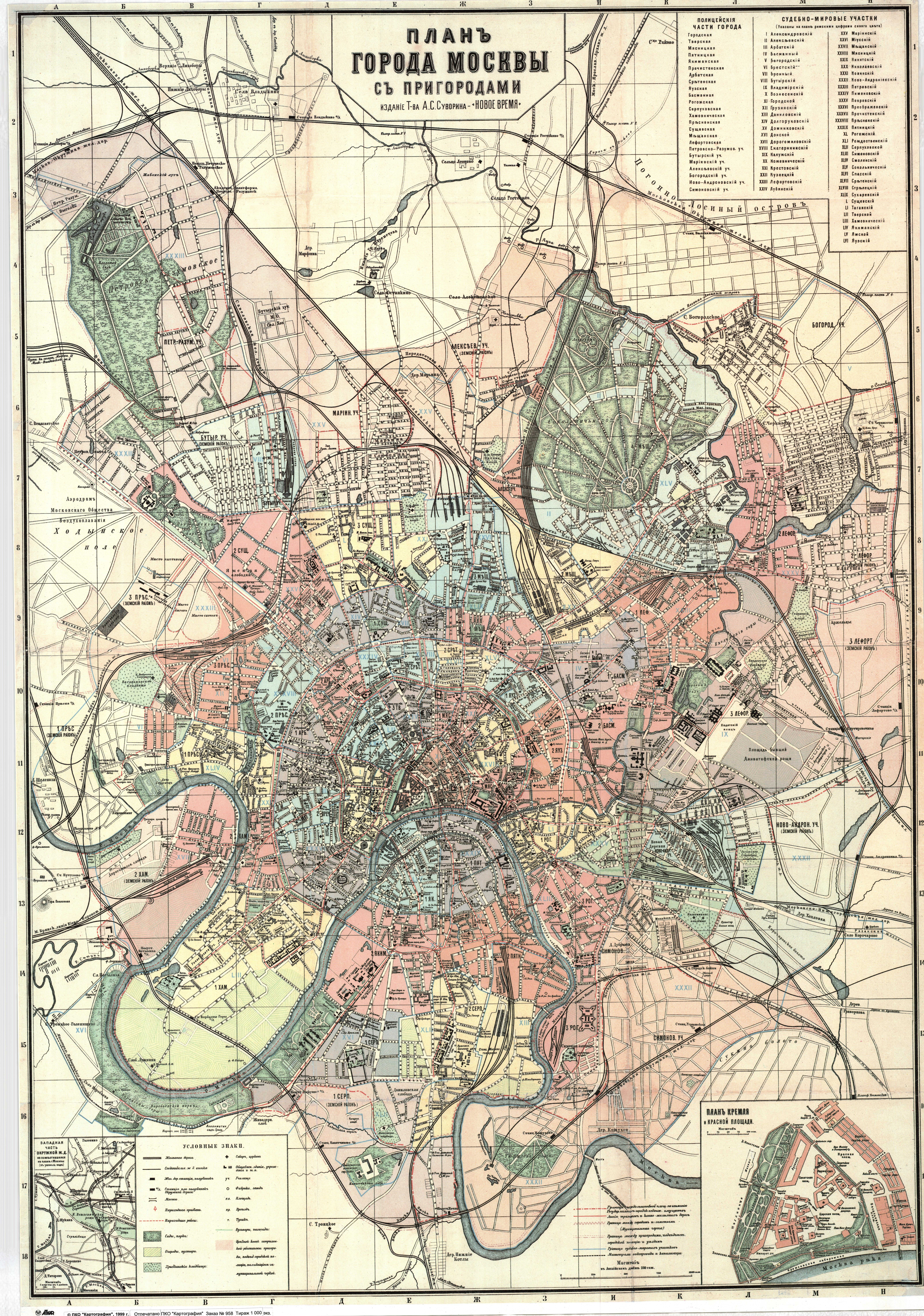
Plan of Moscow, 1917

External videos
- Song from the Soviet "New Moscow", 1938 film
- "The Best City on Earth" Song by Muslim Magomayev

In November 1917, upon learning of the uprising happening in Petrograd, Moscow’s Bolsheviks also began their uprising. On November 2 (15), 1917, after heavy fighting, Soviet power was established in Moscow.

Then Vladimir Lenin, fearing possible foreign invasion, moved the capital from Petrograd (Saint Petersburg) back to Moscow on March 12, 1918.

Soviet poster, issued on the 800th anniversary of Moscow. The inscription reads: "glory to you, invincible Moscow, beauty and pride of the Russian people".

During the Great Patriotic War, the Soviet State Committee of Defense and the General Staff of the Red Army were located in Moscow. In 1941, 16 divisions of the national volunteers (more than 160,000 people), 25 battalions (18,000 people) and 4 engineering regiments were formed among the Muscovites. On 6 December 1941, German Army Group Centre was stopped at the outskirts of the city and then driven off in the course of the Battle of Moscow. Many factories were evacuated, together with much of the government, and from October 20 the city was declared to be in a state of siege. Its remaining inhabitants built and manned antitank defenses, while the city was bombarded from the air. On May 1, 1944 a medal "For the defense of Moscow" and in 1947 another Medal "In Commemoration of the 800th Anniversary of Moscow" were instituted.

During the postwar years, there was a serious housing crisis, solved by the invention of high-rise apartments. Apartments were built and partly furnished in the factory before being raised and stacked into tall columns. The popular Soviet-era comic film Irony of Fate parodies this construction method.

The city of Zelenograd was built in 1958 at 37 km from the city center to the north-west, along the Leningradskoye Shosse, and incorporated as one of Moscow's administrative okrugs. Moscow State University moved to its campus on Sparrow Hills in 1953.

On May 8, 1965 due to the actual 20th anniversary of the victory in World War II Moscow was awarded a title of the Hero City. In 1980 it hosted the Summer Olympic Games.

The MKAD ring road was opened in 1961. It had four lanes running 109 km along the city borders. The MKAD marked the administrative boundaries of the city of Moscow until the 1980s, when outlying suburbs beyond the ring road began to be incorporated.

In 1991 Moscow was the scene of a coup attempt by conservators opposed to the liberal reforms of Mikhail Gorbachev.

=== Metro ===
The Moscow Metro opened in 1935 and immediately became the centerpiece of the transportation system. More than that it was a Stalinist device to awe and control the populace, and give them an appreciation of Soviet realist art. It became the prototype for future Soviet large-scale technologies. Lazar Kaganovich was in charge; he designed the subway so that citizens would absorb the values and ethos of Stalinist civilization as they rode. The artwork of the 13 original stations became nationally and internationally famous. For example, the Sverdlov Square subway station featured porcelain bas-reliefs depicting the daily life of the Soviet peoples, and the bas-reliefs at the Dynamo Stadium sports complex glorified sports and the physical prowess of the powerful new "Homo Sovieticus." (Soviet man). The metro was touted as the symbol of the new social order—a sort of Communist cathedral of engineering modernity. Soviet workers did the labor and the art work, but the main engineering designs, routes, and construction plans were handled by specialists recruited from the London Underground. The Britons called for tunneling instead of the "cut-and-cover" technique, the use of escalators instead of lifts, and designed the routes and the rolling stock. The paranoia of Stalin and the NKVD was evident when the secret police arrested numerous British engineers for espionage—that is for gaining an in-depth knowledge of the city's physical layout. Engineers for the Metropolitan Vickers Electrical Company were given a show trial and deported in 1933, ending the role of British business in the USSR.

Until nowadays Moscow metro is one of the most important heritage of architecture of the USSR period. The most inspiring metro stations of the Stalin's era are Revolution Square, Kievskaya, Beloruskaya, Mayakovskaya, Novoslobodskaya, Dostoevskaya, Prospekt mira, Komsomolskaya and Taganskaya.

== Recent history (1991 to present) ==
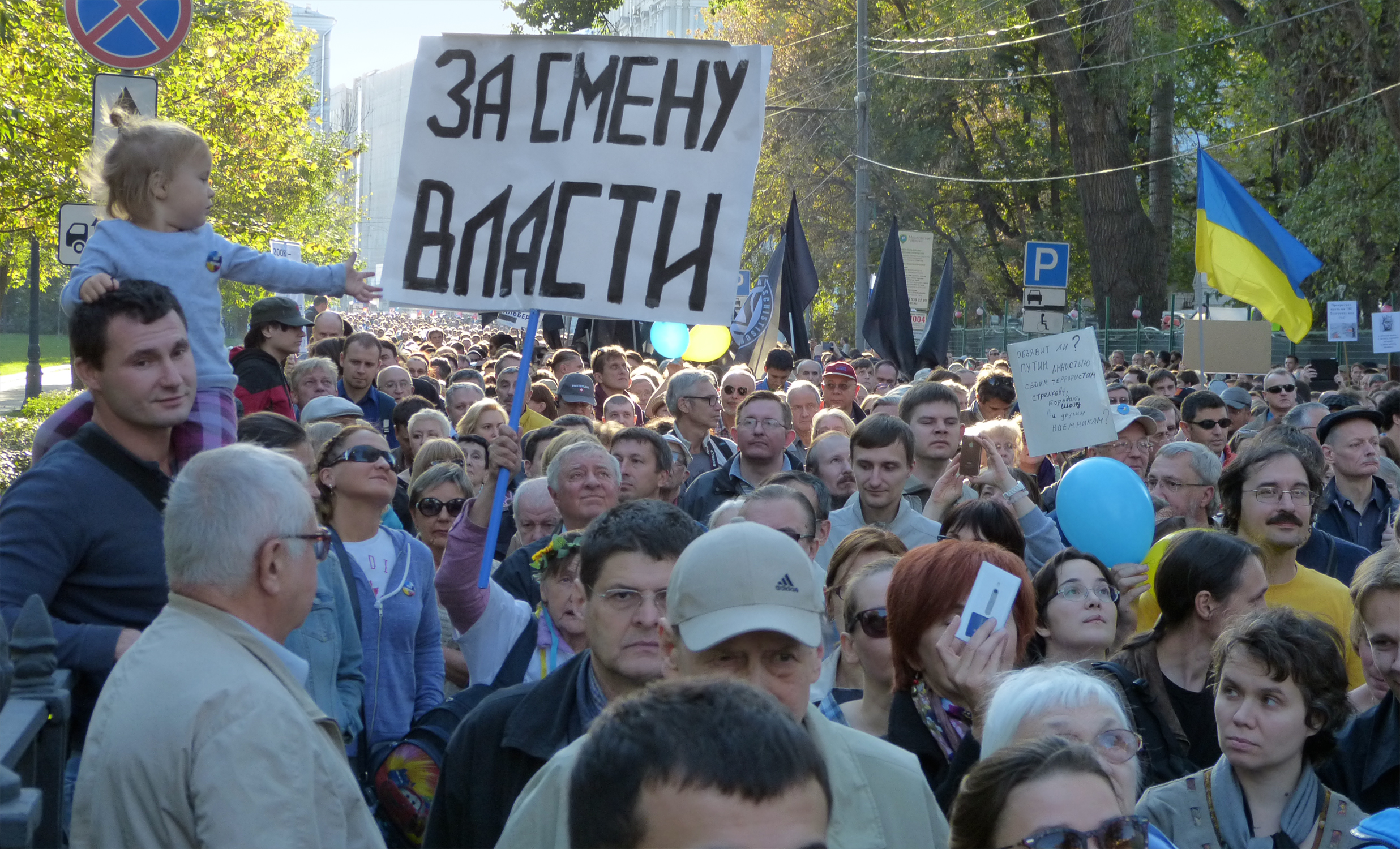
2014 anti-war protests in Moscow

When the USSR was dissolved in the same year, Moscow became the capital of the Russian Federation. Since then a market economy has emerged in Moscow, producing an explosion of Western-style retailing, services, architecture, and lifestyles.

Even with Russia's population shrinking by 6 million after the fall of the USSR, Moscow has continued to grow during the 1990s to 2000s, its population rising from below nine to above ten million. Mason and Nigmatullina argue that Soviet-era urban-growth controls (before 1991) produced controlled and sustainable metropolitan development, typified by the greenbelt built in 1935. Since then however, there has been a dramatic growth of low-density suburban sprawl, created by a heavy demand for single-family dwellings as opposed to crowded apartments. In 1995–1997 the MKAD ring road was widened from the initial four to ten lanes. In December 2002 Bulvar Dmitriya Donskogo became the first Moscow Metro station that opened beyond the limits of MKAD. The Third Ring Road, intermediate between the early 19th-century Garden Ring and the Soviet era outer ring road, was completed in 2004. The greenbelt is becoming more and more fragmented, and satellite cities are appearing at the fringe. Summer dachas are being converted into year-round residences, and with the proliferation of automobiles there is heavy traffic congestion.

== Historical demographics ==
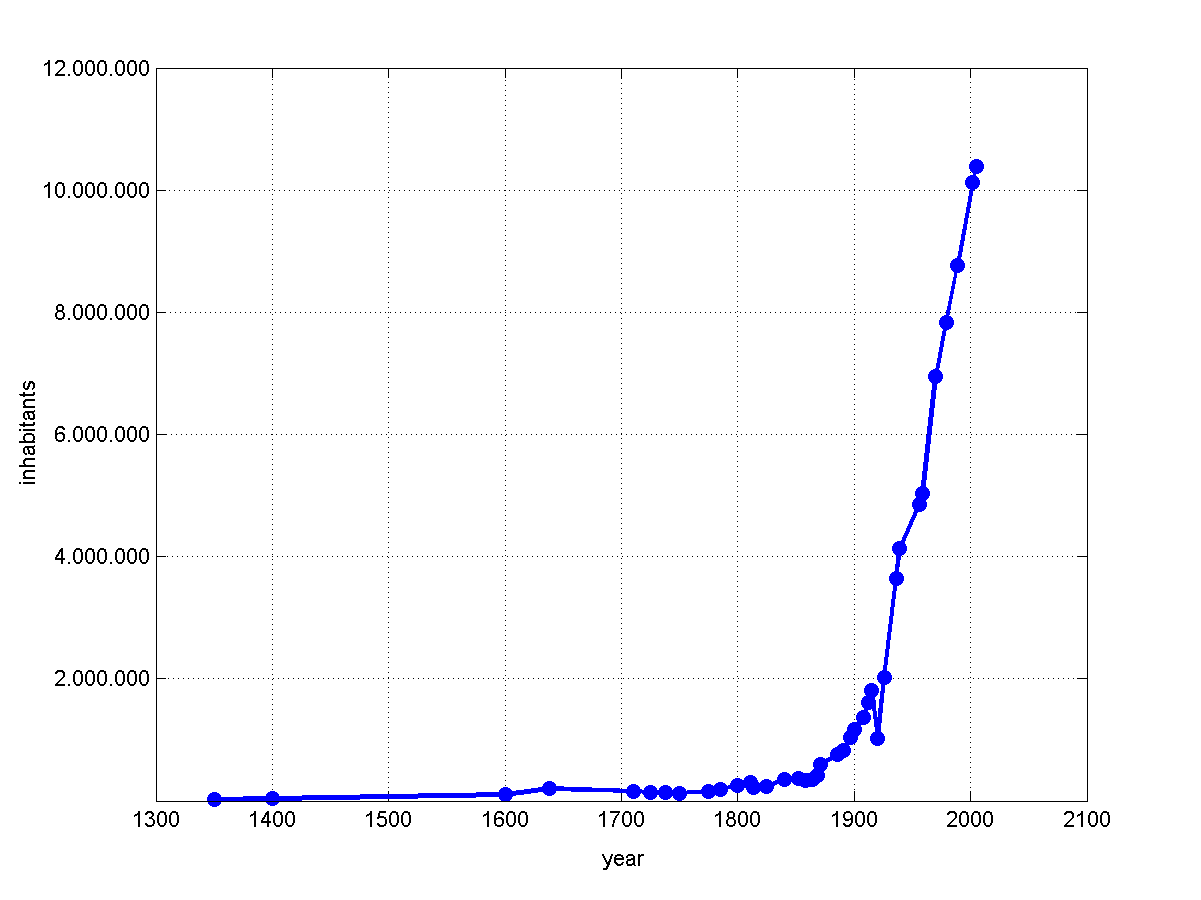
Graphic: population progress

The city's population is rapidly increasing. The ubiquitous presence of legal and illegal permanent and temporary migrants plus merging suburbs raise the total population to about 13.5 million people.

Year	Population
1350	30 000
1400	40 000
1600	100 000
1638	200 000
1710	160 000
1725	145 000
1738	138 400
1750	130 000
1775	161 000
1785	188 700
1800	250 000
1811	300 000
1813	215 000

Year	Population
1825	241 500
1840	349 100
1852	373 800
1858	336 400
1864	351 600
1868	416 400
1871	601 969
1886	753 459
1891	822 400
1897	1 038 600
1900	1 175 000
1908	1 359 200
1912	1 617 157

Year	Population
1915	1 817 000
1920	1 028 200
1926	2 019 500
1936	3 641 500
1939	4 137 000
1956	4 847 000
1959	5 032 000
1970	6 941 961
1979	7 830 509
1989	8 769 117
2002	10 126 424
2005	10 407 000
2012	11 500 000
