= Aleksandr Arosev =

Russian revolutionary, Soviet diplomat and writer

- Алекса́ндр Аро́сев
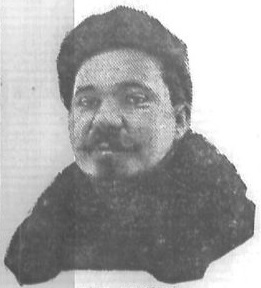
- Picture of Arosev on the Vechernyaya Moskva newspaper, 1927
- Born: Aleksander Yakovlevich Arosev; 6 June 1890; Kazan, Russian Empire
- Died: 10 February 1938 (aged 47); Moscow, Russian SFSR, Soviet Union
- Occupations: Diplomat, writer
- Children: 3, including Olga Aroseva

Aleksander Yakovlevich Arosev (Russian: Алекса́ндр Я́ковлевич Аро́сев; 6 June [O.S. 25 June] 1890 – 10 February 1938) was a Russian revolutionary, Soviet diplomat and writer.

== Biography ==
=== Revolutionary career ===
Arosev was born in to the family of a tailor. His mother was the daughter of the Narodnaya Volya member August Johann Goldschmidt (of German Baltic descent); his father was the son of former serfs.

In 1905 he joined the Party of Socialist Revolutionaries and participated in the 1905 Revolution. In 1907, under the influence of his old friend Vyacheslav Skryabin (later Vyacheslav Molotov), he joined the Bolshevik faction of the Russian Social Democratic Labour Party.

After he joined the Bolsheviks, Arosev was repeatedly arrested until he fled abroad in 1909. He then studied at the Faculty of Philosophy in the University of Liège. In 1911 he met Maxim Gorky in Capri and later returned to Moscow and was again arrested. He served his sentence and was mobilised in the Imperial Russian Army in 1916 as a warrant officer until and served there until the February Revolution.

During the October Revolution he was a member of the Moscow Military Revolutionary Committee and commanded Bolshevik detachments. It was on his order that shelling was fired at the Kremlin, which was in the hands of the Cadets. In 1918, he became Commissar of Glavvozdukhflot. On September 18 of the same year, in Spassk, Kazan Provence, his mother, Maria Avgustovna Vertynskaya, who was a Socialist-Revolutionary, was shot by the White Czechoslovak Corps. In 1919, he was the commissar of the headquarters of the 10th Army of the Southern Front.

=== Soviet official and diplomat ===
In 1920 he was appointed the Chairman of the Supreme Revolutionary Tribunal of Ukraine. From 1921 he worked as deputy director at the Institute for the History of the Party and the October Revolution, which in 1924 was renamed the Lenin Institute. Until 1927, Arosev was also active in the Soviet state security forces of the Cheka and the OGPU.

In 1927 Arosev was the Soviet ambassador to Lithuania, from 1929 to 1933, the plenipotentiary ambassador in Czechoslovakia, then he worked in the Soviet embassy in France. From 1934 to 1937, Arosev was the Chairman of the Society of Cultural Relations with Foreign Countries (VOKS). He was a Delegate of the 1st All-Union Congress of Writers. In 1935 he acted as an interpreter at a meeting between Romain Rolland and Joseph Stalin during a visit to the USSR by the writer. Arosev was a resident of the famous apartment complex House on the Embankment.

=== Arrest and execution ===
Arosev was arrested during the height of the Great Purge on 3 July 1937 after he went to see Nikolai Yezhov, whom he knew since the Civil War. During the investigation, in order to avoid torture, he signed all the confessions that the investigators demanded from him, but during the trial he retracted them, saying that he had given confessions under pressure. Arosev wrote multiple letters to his old friend Vyacheslav Molotov during this period pleading for him to intervene in his trial, however he never got any response.

In 1938 he was sentenced to death by the Military Collegium of the Supreme Court of the USSR. On 10 February 1938 he was shot, together with Vladimir Antonov-Ovseenko.

Aleksander Arosev was rehabilitated in 1956.

== Literary career ==
Arosev started his writing career during his exiles. He made his debut in 1916 with the story "The Carpenters" and the poem "Beloshveyk". In 1917, Tvorchestvo magazine published several stories. In 1919 he became the editor of the provincial newspaper Znamya Revolyutsii, where he published his essays and stories.

Most of his writings were about the revolutionary struggle against tsarism and Bolshevik heroism. He also wrote some children's books. Arosev worked with Alexander Voronsky in his magazine Krasnaya Nov and later for the magazine Novy Mir. Arosev was considered to be one of the most prominent proletarian writers in the RSFSR and many of his works were published widely in magazines until his arrest. However, after his rehabilitation, only one of his books was published,The White Ladder.

== Family and memory ==
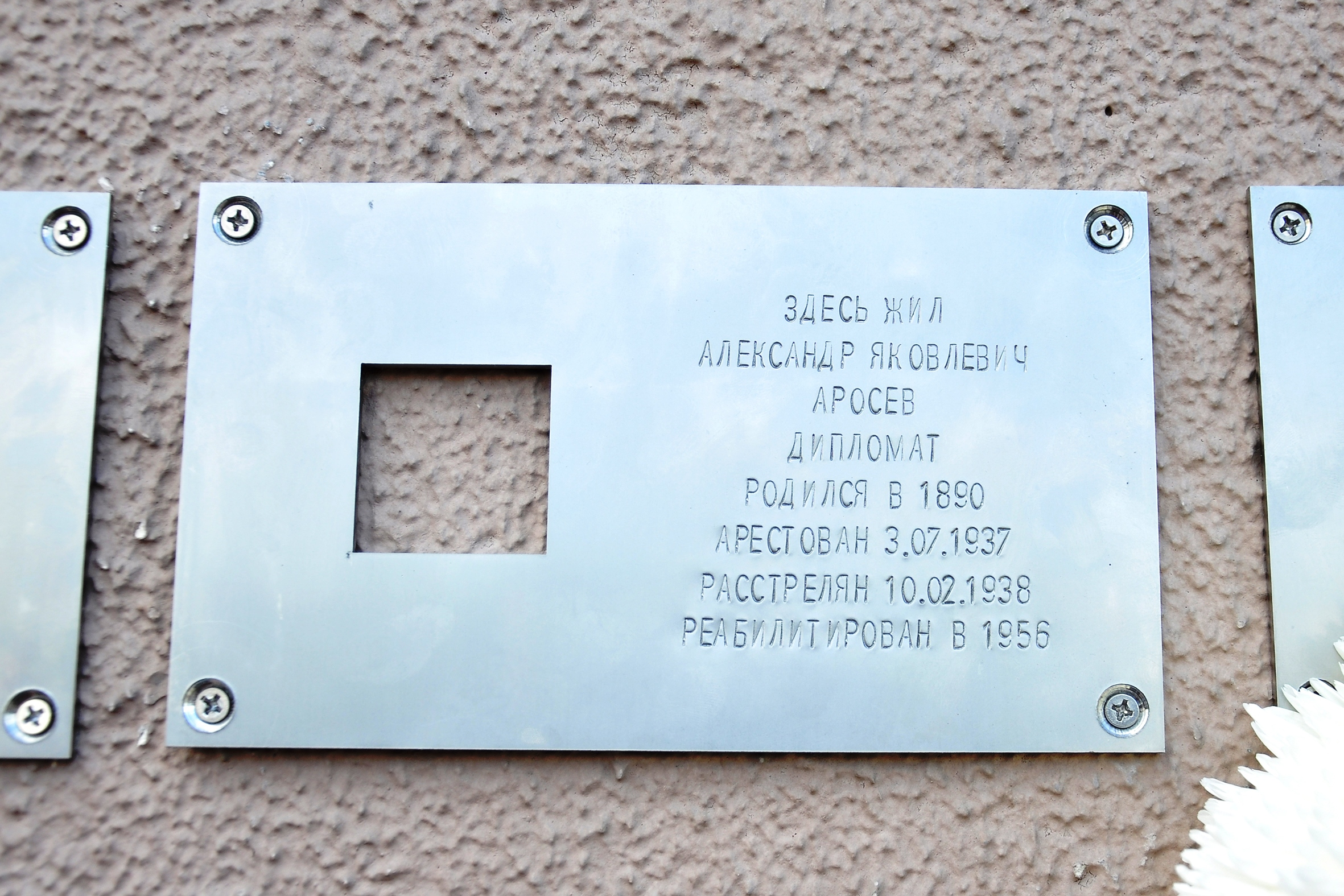
The last address of the house where Alexander and Gertrude Arosev lived.

He was father of actresses Elena (1923–2016) and Olga Aroseva. His oldest daughter, Natalia Aroseva (1919–1990) was one of the leading translators of the USSR of the Czech language, the author of the novel Footprint on the Earth, which was dedicated to her father. From his second marriage with Greta Freund, he had a son, Dmitry (1934).

In her latest book, "Who Lived Twice," released shortly before her death, actress Olga Aroseva published her father's diaries.

His cenotaph is in the Golovinsky cemetery in Moscow. Streets in Donetsk and Kryvyi Rog (renamed Krasnobalkovskaya street in 2016) in Ukraine were named after him.
