= Vechernyaya Moskva =

Russian newspaper

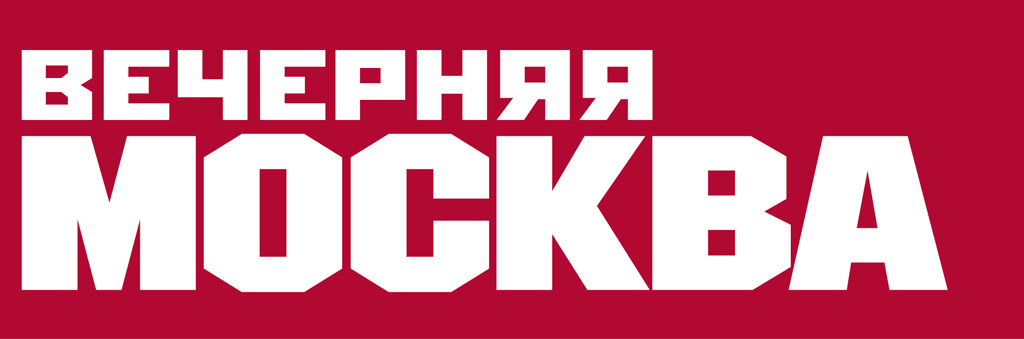
- Type: daily
- Format: A2 per spread
- Owner: Concern "Vechernyaya Moskva"
- Founded: December 6, 1923
- Political alignment: independent
- Headquarters: Moscow, Russia
- Circulation: 25,000 daily, 787,000 weekly
- Website: https://vm.ru/

Vechernyaya Moskva (Russian: Вечерняя Москва, lit. 'Evening Moscow') is a Russian local newspaper published in Moscow since 6 December 1923 daily (except Saturday and Sunday).

== History ==
It was founded as an organ of the Mossovet, later as an organ of the city committee of the CPSU and the Mossovet.

In 1948, annual competitions in skeet shooting for the prize of the newspaper "Vechernyaya Moskva" began (the winner of these competitions received a special crystal cup as a reward).

In 1969, the newspaper's circulation was 30 thousand copies. Since 1990, it has been published by the joint-stock company Concern 'Vechernyaya Moskva'.

This is the oldest evening newspaper in Russia, one of the most popular in Moscow with a current circulation of 25,000 copies per day plus 787,000 copies of weekly edition.

In 2011, the project was restarted and developed with the support of the Government of Moscow as a city newspaper of influence covering the major events in the capital, the work of urban services, governance, and the main events in the country and in the world.

== Editors-in-chief ==
- Volin, Boris Mikhailovich (1923–1924)
- Antoshkin, Dmitry Vasilyevich (1925)
- Barkov, Vladimir Nikolayevich (1926–1928)
- Lazian, Iosif Gerasimovich (1928–1930)
- Volodin, Sergey Alekseevich (1930–1931)
- Tsypin, Grigory Evgenievich (1931–1932)
- Rzhanov, Georgy Alexandrovich (1932–1933)
- Romanovsky, Abram Mironovich (1933–1937)
- Pozdnov, Mikhail Mikhailovich (1937–1942)
- Vasilenko, Vasily Stepanovich (1942–1945)
- Fomichev, Andrei Andreevich (1945–1950)
- Syrokomsky, Vitaly Aleksandrovich (1963–1966)
- Semyon Indursky (1966 – January 1988)
- Lisin, Alexander Ivanovich (1988–1998)
- Kazarin, Yuri Ivanovich (February 1998 – 2000)
- Evseev, Valery Petrovich (2000–2006)
- Brantov, Peter Yurievich (February 3 – May 5, 2006)
- Avyazova, Zhanna Semonovna (2006–2007)
- Ryazhsky, Yury Olegovich (2007–2011)
- Kupriyanov, Alexander Ivanovich (2011–2025)
