= Aleksei Nikitin (revolutionary) =

Bolshevik revolutionary (1870–1938)

Aleksei Yakovlevich Nikitin (Russian: Алексей Яковлевич Никитин, 1870–1938) was a Russian Bolshevik revolutionary. He was a statistician and land surveyor by profession. Around the time of the October Revolution, Nikitin was part of the new revolutionary city government of Moscow.

== Youth ==
Nikitin was born in 1870 into a peasants family the village of Monva, Kursky Uyezd. He graduated from the Kursk Land Surveying School. He joined the revolutionary movement in the 1890s, active in underground activities in Kursk, Oryol and Moscow. In December 1897, the Czarist authorities arrested Niktin, accusing him of membership in the for belonging to the Moscow Workers Union. He remained in jail until December 1898. Once released Nikitin was exiled to Kursk awaiting trial. In June 1899 he was sentenced to 3 years of exile to Vyatka Governorate.

== Return to Moscow ==
After Nikitin completed his period in exile, he returned to life in Moscow where he worked for the city municipal government. Nikitin was a member of the Moscow City District Committee of the Russian Social Democratic Labour Party. Nikitin was again arrested on June 25 [O.S. June 12] 1910, but he was release due to lack of sufficient evidence against him.

== October Revolution ==
In early November 1917 the Moscow Military Revolutionary Committee dissolved the Moscow City Duma, and named a 4-member provisional council to handle the affairs of Moscow municipal governance and city finances - with Nikitin as one of its members. A few days later, when the Council of District Dumas was instituted as a new municipal government, Nikitin was included in its Bureau (executive organ of government).

== Later years ==
Nikitin would go on to serve as the Deputy Director of the Central Forest Experimental Station of the Moscow Region Land Department. He died in 1938, and was buried at the Novodevichy Cemetery.
