= Vasily Yesin =

Vasily Zakharovich Yesin
- Василий Захарович Есин
- Born: 1888
- Died: 1960 (aged 71–72)
- Resting place: Novodevichy Cemetery
- Education: Electrotechnical Institute (1931); Moscow Institute for the Mechanization and Electrification of Agriculture
- Occupations: Electrician, government official
- Years active: 1913–1957
- Organization(s): GOELRO (1920–1921); Council of Labor and Defense (from 1921); GOSPLAN (1923); People's Commissariat of Agriculture of the RSFSR; State Planning Committee of the RSFSR (1934–1937)
- Known for: October Revolution, GOELRO, Deputy Chairman of State Planning Committee of the RSFSR
- Political party: Bolshevik Party (from 1913)
- Spouse: Anna Georgieva Yesina (1893–1979)

Vasily Zakharovich Yesin (Russian: Есин, Василий Захарович, 1888-1960) was a Soviet Russian revolutionary and government official. He was an electrician by profession. Yesin joined the Bolshevik Party in 1913. Between 1914 and 1915, Yesin worked on the Moscow–Kazan Railway. Between 1915 and 1919, he was employed at military vehicle repair shops.

In 1917 he was elected to the Moscow Soviet of Workers and Soldiers Deputies and the Moscow City Duma (representing the Blagusha-Lefortovo area). He headed the Bolshevik list in the 10th District (Lefortovo) in the 1917 Moscow District Duma election. Yesin was an active participant in the October Revolution.

Yesin served at the front-line of the Russian Civil War 1919-1920. He was a delegate at the 8th All-Russian Congress of Soviets held in December 1920, representing the soldiers of the Caucasus Front. He was a member of the State Commission for Electrification of Russia (GOELRO) 1920-1921.

Between 1921 and 1957 he worked in different government and economic institutions. With a recommendation from Lenin, he was appointed to the Council of Labor and Defense in 1921. As of 1923 he was the chairman of the Tractor Commission of GOSPLAN. He worked for the People's Commissariat of Agriculture of the RSFSR, heading the electrification division of the People's Commissariat (Elektrozem).

In 1931 he graduated from the Electrotechnical Institute In the 1930s he studied at the Moscow Institute for the Mechanization and Electrification of Agriculture (MIMEA). Between 1934 and 1937 he served as the Deputy Chairman of the State Planning Committee of the RSFSR. Between 1937 and 1939 he worked on the construction of the All-Union Agricultural Exhibition. From 1939 to 1957 Yesin worked at the Teplokontrol trust

Yesin retired in 1957 He died in 1960, and was he was buried at the Novodevichy Cemetery alongside his wife Anna Georgieva Yesina (1893-1979).
