= Zemlyanoy Gorod =

Outer ring of 17th-century Moscow, Russia

Coordinates: 55°45′N 37°37′E

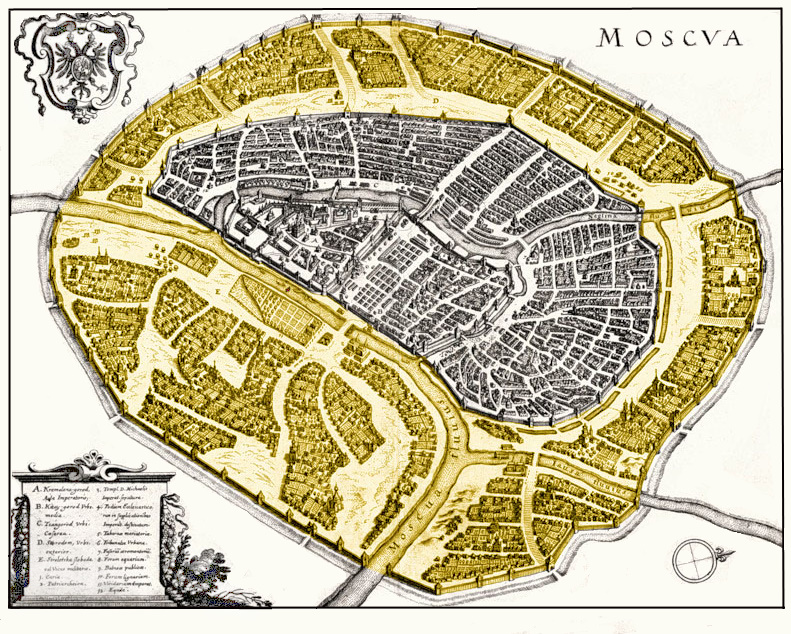
1638 plan of Moscow by Matthäus Merian, with Zemlyanoy Gorod highlighted

Zemlyanoy Gorod (Russian: Земляной город, IPA: [zʲɪmlʲɪˈnoj ˈɡorət] "Earthworks City") in 17th-century Moscow was the outer ring of the city, surrounded by ramparts and a moat. It surrounded the older moat built by Aloisio the New in the early 16th century which delimited Bely Gorod.

Historical Zemlyanoy Gorod corresponds to the area now in between the Boulevard Ring and the Garden Ring roads.
