= Moscow Military Revolutionary Committee =

Militant group of the Moscow Soviet in November 1917

- A commemorative plaque on the Moscow City Hall Building which housed the Moscow Military Revolutionary Committee
- Abbreviation: MVRK
- Predecessor: Bolshevik Military Organizations
- Successor: Political Directorate of the Soviet Army and Soviet Navy
- Formation: November 7, 1917; 108 years ago
- Dissolved: November 27, 1917; 108 years ago
- Type: Military
- Purpose: Enforcement
- Headquarters: Moscow
- Official language: Russian
- Chairman: Mikhail Pokrovsky
- Affiliations: RSDLP (Bolsheviks), Left SR, Mossoviet

Moscow Military Revolutionary Committee (Russian: Московский военно-революционный комитет) was an illegal body of the Moscow Soviet of Workers' and Soldiers' Deputies, controlled by the RSDLP(b), for the leadership of the Moscow Bolshevik Uprising. After the victory of the uprising, it acted for some time as the highest executive body in the Moscow Governorate. It existed from November 7 to 27, 1917.

== History ==
Initially, the Bolsheviks planned to start the uprising simultaneously in Petrograd and Moscow, and having begun to implement the plan for the uprising in Petrograd, the Central Committee instructed A. Lomov and Viktor Nogin to inform the Moscow regional bureau of the RSDLP(b) about this. However, Nogin was able to send the telegram only at 11:45, when practically all of Petrograd was already under the control of the rebels.

As in Petrograd, in Moscow the Bolsheviks intended to carry out the uprising in the name of the Soviet, which ensured the preservation of "legality" and gave their actions the form of self-defense, allowing them to hope for the possibility of thus bringing the garrison out onto the streets in the name of the Soviet. In connection with this, the Bolshevik leadership decided to create a special center on the basis of the Soviets for "protecting the gains of the revolution from the onslaught of counterrevolutionary forces", with the participation of factions of all socialist parties.

On the afternoon of October 25, a meeting of the bureau of all factions of the Moscow Soviet of Workers' Deputies was held with the participation of the Bolsheviks. Also present were the mayor Vadim Rudnev and Colonel Konstantin Ryabtsev, who would soon command the counteraction to the uprising. At the meeting, the Socialist Revolutionaries and Mensheviks proposed creating a "temporary democratic-revolutionary body" to fight against the "counterrevolution" and promote revolutionary order, which would include not only representatives of the Soviets, but also city government and the headquarters of the military district. The Bolsheviks did not reject this proposal, but agreed to discuss it in their faction, which was perceived as preliminary consent.

On the same day, at 5 p.m., a joint meeting of the Moscow Council of Workers' Deputies and the Council of Soldiers' Deputies opened in the Polytechnic Museum, the debate at which lasted until late at night. The cause of the disputes was a new proposal from the Bolsheviks, according to which the tasks of the committee were sharply changed, and the organization of a committee to support the Petrograd Soviet was already becoming a stage in the seizure of power into the hands of the Soviets.

The representative of the Socialist Revolutionaries E. M. Ratner believed that the creation of the committee would hinder the convocation of the Constituent Assembly, and the Menshevik I. A. Isuv also spoke out against the Bolshevik proposal. Nevertheless, the majority of the deputies gathered in the Polytechnic Museum voted for the clear and precise proposal of the Bolsheviks, and not for the vague and ambivalent position of the other left parties. As a result, by 394 votes to 106, with 23 abstentions, the Moscow Military Revolutionary Committee was sanctioned by the Moscow Council.

It consisted of 7 members and 6 candidates. From the Bolsheviks: members - Afanasi Lomov (Georgy Oppokov), Vladimir Smirnov, Grigory Usievich, Nikolay Muralov, candidates - Aleksandr Arosev, Pavel Mostovenko, Alexei Rykov and S. Ya. Budzinsky; from the Mensheviks: members - M. I. Teitelbaum, M. F. Nikolaev; from the United Internationalists - I. F. Konstantinov. According to a number of sources, the candidates from the United Internationalists were Lev Galperin (Konyaga) and V. Ya. Yasenev, but according to the historian S. P. Melgunov, the last name of the candidate from the Mensheviks was Galpern, from the United Internationalists - Yasenko.

The Socialist Revolutionaries did not participate in the voting and refused to join the Moscow Military Revolutionary Committee, the Mensheviks stated through Aron Yugov that they were not joining it in order to facilitate the seizure of power, but were pursuing the goal within the committee of fighting the “insane adventure” and softening the blows that “will fall on the heads of democracy”.

Due to the large volume of work that the elected members of the MVRK could not cope with, more than 20 people were co-opted into its composition. Among them were Bolsheviks: Chief of Staff of the Red Guard A. S. Vedernikov, Arkady Rosengolts, as well as members of the executive committee of the Moscow City Council Pyotr Smidovich, E. N. Ignatov, representatives of trade unions Grigory Melnichansky, M. V. Rykunov, P. I. Kushner, representative of the temporary committee of soldiers' deputies ("dozens") S. A. Sava-Stepnyak, N. I. Plekhanov, Socialist Revolutionary Maximalist (later Bolshevik) S. L. Pupko.

A headquarters for military operational leadership of the uprising was created under the MVRK (Smirnov, Arosev, A. M. Alter). During October 25–27 (November 7–9), MRCs, consisting mainly of Bolsheviks, were organized in all districts of the city. The work of the Bolsheviks in the Moscow Military Revolutionary Committee was controlled by the Combat Party Center, elected by a joint meeting of the Moscow Regional Bureau, the Moscow District Committee, and the Moscow Committee of the RSDLP(b) on the morning of October 25 (November 7).

== Armed uprising ==
On the afternoon of October 25, the Bolshevik Combat Party Center began using force by occupying the city post office with its patrols. An order was also issued "to stop the publication of 'bourgeois' newspapers" by forcibly occupying the corresponding printing houses.

On October 26, the MVRK began preparing for the uprising, simultaneously beginning negotiations with the Committee of Public Safety. On October 27 (November 9), Colonel Ryabtsev issued an ultimatum to dissolve the MVRK and withdraw troops from the Kremlin. The MVRK rejected the Mensheviks' demand for an agreement with the Committee of Public Safety, after which they left the MVRK, and representatives of the united forces subsequently left it as well. On the same day, military actions began, as a result of which Ryabtsev's troops occupied the Kremlin. On October 28, there was a threat of seizing the Moscow City Council building on Tverskaya Street, where the Moscow Military Revolutionary Committee was located. Then the revolutionary forces gradually began to achieve success, but at the request of the Vikzhel, the Moscow Military Revolutionary Committee agreed to declare a truce on October 30. The truce was soon broken, and the Moscow Military Revolutionary Committee was given the order to use artillery. On the night of November 2–3, the cadets and the "white guard" laid down their arms. On November 2 (15), the Moscow Military Revolutionary Committee issued an order to cease fire and declare the revolution a victory.

== After the victory of the uprising ==
On November 3, at an evening session, the Moscow Military Revolutionary Committee adopted a resolution on the reorganization of the Moscow City Duma. On November 5, 1917, the City Duma ceased to exist. The management of the city economy passed into the hands of the Council of District Dumas. The Moscow Military Revolutionary Committee removed the previous command of the Moscow Military District, appointing N. Muralov as commander, Aleksandr Arosev as his assistant, and A. Morozov as chief of staff. The Moscow Military Revolutionary Committee sent its commissars to the most important areas: to the districts and sub-districts, to institutions, to military units, to the railway, to the provinces. On November 4, 1917, a joint meeting of the Moscow Military Revolutionary Committee and representatives of the district military revolutionary committees made a decision to take measures to restore revolutionary order in the city. The maintenance of order was entrusted to the Red Guard and the police.

The question of the organizational foundations of the new government in the city was hotly discussed in the Military Revolutionary Committee, since at the same time the Bolsheviks were negotiating the formation of a government with other socialist parties. It was on the agenda of the committee meetings on November 3 and 4. The Moscow Committee of Bolsheviks and the Military Revolutionary Committee began negotiations with the Left Socialist Revolutionaries and United Internationalists; on November 5, a meeting of MK representatives with representatives of these parties was held. The representatives of the parties agreed to enter into a coalition with the Bolsheviks and supported the idea of transferring power in Moscow to the Soviets.

An inter-party conference with the participation of representatives of the five socialist parties and the Military Revolutionary Committee was convened on November 6. The Right Socialist Revolutionaries demanded the repeal of the dissolution of the city duma, while the Mensheviks demanded the restoration of democratic freedoms. The Bolsheviks refused to fulfill these demands, and soon the Mensheviks and Right Socialist Revolutionaries left the meeting. On November 7, the meeting of the executive committee of the Moscow Soviet of Workers' Deputies, despite the objections of the Mensheviks, adopted a resolution stating that the Soviets were the only revolutionary organs of power.

As the sphere of activity of the new organs of power, the Soviets, expanded, the functions of the military revolutionary committees narrowed. Therefore, on November 12, the general meeting of the military revolutionary committees of Moscow decided to dissolve them. On November 14 (27), the Moscow Military Revolutionary Committee held its last meeting, after which the leadership of the political and economic life of the city passed into the hands of the Moscow Soviet of Workers' and Soldiers' Deputies, formed on the same day as a result of the merger of the separate Soviet of Workers' Deputies and the Soviet of Soldiers' Deputies.
