= Boris Volin =

Soviet Historian (1886–1957)

Boris Mikhailovich Volin (born: Josif Yefimovich Fradkin; 13 June 1886 – 15 February 1957) was a Soviet historian, journalist and politician.

== Life ==
He was born to a Jewish family in Hlybokaye, Disnensky Uyezd, Vilna Governorate (now Hlybokaye District, Vitebsk Region, Belarus). Volin became a member of the RSDLP (b) in 1904. He published Questions of History and campaigned against alcohol consumption. He was a member of the Central Committee elected by the 17th Congress of the All-Union Communist Party (Bolsheviks). He was head of the School Department from 13 May 1935 to 1936. Volin was director of the Main Administration for Literary and Publishing Affairs (Glavit) from July 1931 to 1935. He was awarded the Order of the Patriotic War for organising partisan detachments. He was a researcher at the Marx-Engels-Lenin Institute as well as a professor at the Moscow State University. He died in Moscow and was buried at the Novodevichy Cemetery.

== See also ==
- List of mayors of Kharkiv

== Sources ==
- Lenin w Powolschje (Lenin in der Wolgaregion) 1870 bis 1893, 2. Bände, Moskau 1956.
