= Nikolayevsk incident =

Incident in the Russian Civil War

- Part of the Russian Civil War and the Red Terror
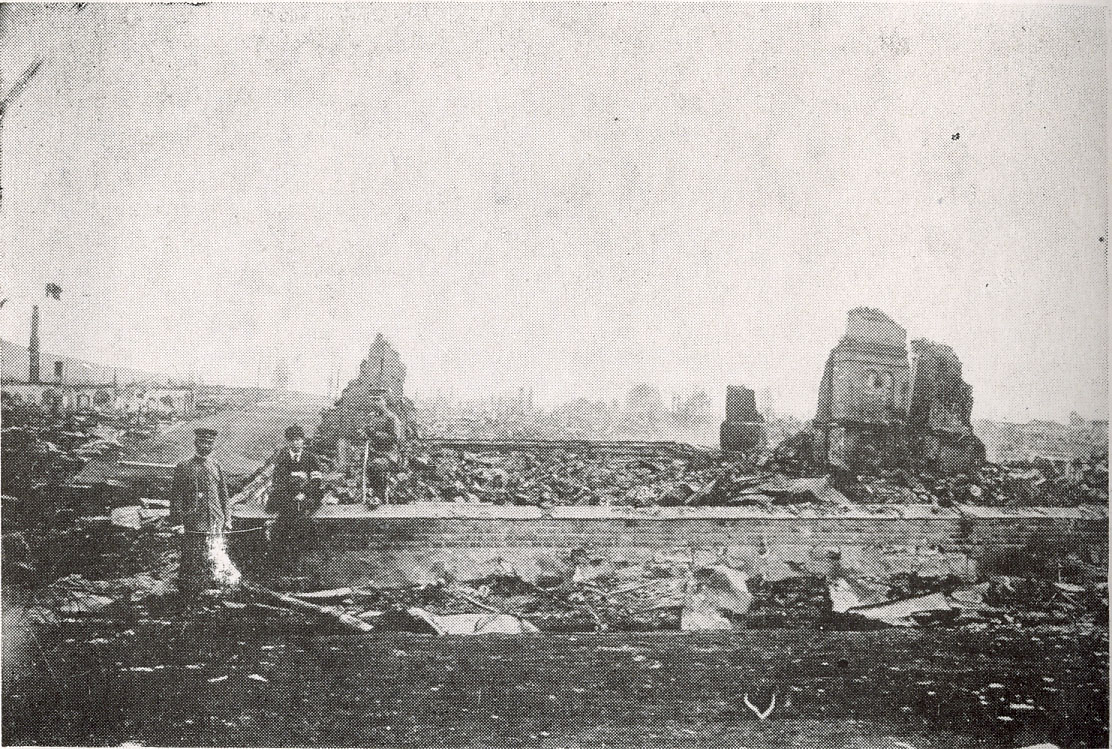
- The ruins of Nikolayevsk after the massacre
- Location: 53°08′N 140°44′E; Nikolayevsk-on-Amur, Russian SFSR
- Date: 12 March 1920 – 3 June 1920
- Target: Russian and Japanese civilians and POWs
- Attack type: Massacre
- Deaths: Thousands (half of the population)
- Perpetrator: Red Army Partisan detachment under Yakov Tryapitsyn

The Nikolayevsk incident or Nikolaevsk incident (Russian: Николаевский инцидент) was a series of mass killings that took place in the region of Nikolayevsk-on-Amur during the Russian Civil War. The massacre and terrorism perpetrated by the Red Army under Yakov Tryapitsyn (a group of Russian Bolshevik-anarchist, Chinese and Korean guerrillas led by Ilya Park killed thousands of Russians in Nikolaevsk and devastated the region.

In general, historians agree that the event was a massacre in which there was "unprecedented and unprovoked brutality". Following a hastily prepared court-martial, Tryapitsyn and 29 of his colleagues were executed, while another 33 received prison terms.

According to Bolshevik documents and trial verdicts, half of the population of Nikolaevsk was killed in the massacre, of which the majority were Russians. At the time of the massacre, Japan deliberately omitted facts about the thousands of Russians slaughtered by the Red Army and exaggerated the number of Japanese killed. As a result, the Nikolayevsk Massacre is often mistakenly perceived as a "massacre against the Japanese".

== Background ==
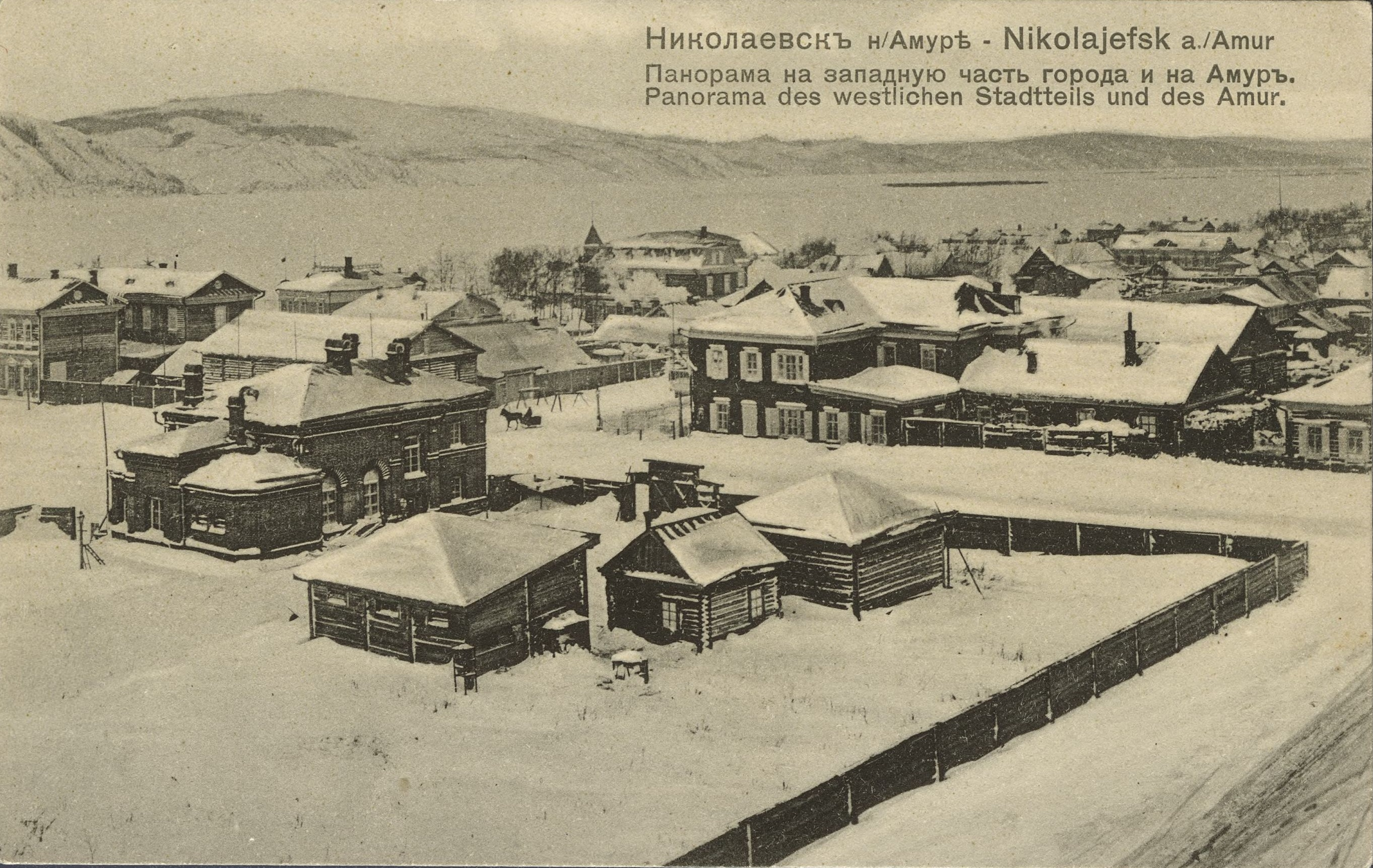
Nikolayevsk-on-Amur around year 1900

According to Dr. Alexey Teplyakov, episodes of Red massacres were not new to the inhabitants of the Russian Far East until 1920. In March 1918, Red Guards seized Blagoveshchensk after Ataman I. M. Gamov's mutiny, resulting in over a thousand resident deaths. Chekist I. P. Pavlunovsky reported in 1922 that mine workers stormed the city and massacred perceived bourgeoisie, killing those suspected of rebellion or sympathy, including most of the city administration and mining office staff.

Press reports in spring 1919 detailed Red atrocities in Blagoveshchensk, stating over 1,000 locals were shot, and grave excavations began. After the city's capture, many students reportedly joined anti-Red forces.

In early April 1920, P. V. Volgodsky, Kolchak's former head of government, met officers who escaped the Red Terror in Vladivostok. They claimed that despite a socialist coalition government, Bolsheviks were active, arresting and torturing White officers before killing them, often staging fake escape attempts.

Far Eastern Socialist-Revolutionary-Maximalist I. I. Zhukovsky-Zhuk noted that many revolutionaries in the Far East, particularly in Blagoveshchensk, employed "ragtag" methods of ruthless revolutionary struggle, including frequent extrajudicial killings. He cited Amur authorities like Matveev and S. Dimitriev, who executed numerous suspected counter-revolutionaries without trial, a practice widely known but largely unopposed, except by Blagoveshchensk anarchists.

However, according to Dr. Alexey Teplyakov, Tryapitsyn's band members managed to carry out the Red Terror in its most ruthless form, when almost all socially and nationally alien elements were physically exterminated, along with a considerable number of "socially close" people.

== Massacre ==
=== The march to Nikolayevsk-on-Amur ===
Yakov Ivanovich Tryapitsyn, an anarchist Red Army Partisan leader who came from Petrograd, was a World War I volunteer who rose to the rank of non-commissioned officer. Following the war, he served in the Olginsky district and the Suchan valley of Primorye, in the Russian Far East. In late 1919, Tryapitsyn was sent by the Military Revolutionary Staff of Red Army Partisan detachments and revolutionary organizations of Khabarovsk and Nikolayev districts to the lower reaches of the Amur River to organize an insurgency there. Tryapitsyn left with the detachment arbitrarily, dissatisfied with the passivity of Red Army Partisan command. Nina Lebedeva-Kiyashko, an active Socialist-Revolutionaries-Maximalist from Blagoveshchensk, left with him as commissar.

The movement of about two thousand troops of Tryapitsyn and Lebedeva down the Amur River was accompanied by the almost complete extermination of rural intellectuals (for revolutionary "passivity") and anyone who looked like a town "bourgeois". Priests were drowned in ice-holes, shot, and taken prisoner, including those who surrendered to the partisans.

One of Tryapitsyn's assistants, Ivan Lapta (Yakov Rogozin), organized a Red Army detachment that "raided villages and camps, robbed and killed people," destroyed those who did not give up gold at the Limursk mines, and looted the Amgun gold mines and surrounding villages. Lapta's detachments, together with the Tryapitsyns Zavarzin, Bitsenko, Dyldin, Otsevilli, and Sasov, killed hundreds of Indigenous peoples of Lower Amurian even before the occupation of the regional center.

There were about 200 Chinese and 200 more Koreans in Tryapitsyn's detachment. The Koreans were commanded by Ilya Park. The Chinese and Koreans were recruited from the gold mines of the taiga. Tryapitsyn paid them generously upfront, promising them gold from the mines and Russian women. Recruited from the mines, these troops were criminal and brutal. Partisan chiefs were appointed by the most determined and cruel personalities, who kept the units in submission by allowing them to plunder and kill.

Lepers were also victims of an incident in Nikolayevsk. In December 1919, Tryapitsyn's army invaded the living quarters of the Leper colony. For two days they captured and robbed people who passed the leprosarium on their way to and from Nikolayevsk and Krasnoye. Paramedics were forced to flee.

=== March ===
The town of Nikolayevsk-on-Amur was located some distance from the main events. However, as part of the 1918 intervention, a Japanese garrison was stationed there because of the city's strategic location at the mouth of the Amur River, opposite Sakhalin Island. In addition, Nikolayevsk had been a hub for gold mining since the late 19th century. In addition to the small garrison stationed there in 1918, Japanese citizens, including the consul and his family, lived in the town.

When the Japanese occupied Nikolayevsk in September 1918, the Imperial Japanese Navy quickly withdrew out of fear of the river freezing over, leaving only the Japanese garrison behind. In addition to the original Russian and Chinese inhabitants, the town was also home to Japanese soldiers and civilian immigrants. Nikolayevsk was cut off from the sea by the frozen river, making overland transportation difficult. The Japanese troops tyrannically controlled Nikolayevsk-on-Amur. Japan used the actions of extremist guerrilla groups of looting and terror against wealthy elites and foreigners as an excuse to delay the intervention in the south of the Russian Far East. Dr. Azarenkov said, For these extremist guerrillas, "red" was a guise.

In 1920, Soviet Russia and Japan discussed a buffer state in the Russian Far East. Recognizing that Kolchak's government had collapsed, the Japanese agreed to allow the Red Army to enter Vladivostok in late January 1920. With so many foreign troops stationed in Primorye, the Bolsheviks were forced to accept the socialist zemstvo. At the same time, Tryapitsyn besieged Nikolaevsk, and after an artillery bombardment at the end of February, captured the city, where a Japanese battalion of 350 and about the same number of White garrisons were stationed. There were no roads in or out before the ice drift, so the defenders of the city could rely only on forces already present. The Red Army entered the area after promising the Japanese garrison and the White garrison that it would not commit any atrocities, signing a pact with the Japanese garrison on February 28. Nevertheless, the Red Army immediately began looting and killing.

Survivor M. V. Sotnikov-Goremyka recalled detainees being hastily shot near the prison, stripped to their underwear. He noted that bodies piled up, many men fainted, but women faced death bravely. The militia killed 72 people. The next day, their naked corpses were taken by sledge and drowned in ice holes, with the perpetrators saying, "Let's send them to Japan."

Based on Nikolaev S. I. Burnashev's testimony, guerrillas agreed with the Japanese military not to make arrests or retaliate. However, on the night of March 8–9, they killed 93 people taken from prison. Burnashev saw the bodies on the shore near Kuenga on March 9. On March 10, the Japanese issued a flyer stating they would take shooting measures due to the Reds "ruining the people," yet arrests continued to increase. On the evening of March 11, the Reds demanded the Japanese commanders surrender their arms by the next morning. That night, around 2 a.m., shooting began as the Japanese advanced.

The red guerrilla forces entered the city after agreeing to peace with the Japanese garrison, but once inside, they ignored the agreement and killed residents. The red guerrilla forces arrested and executed civilians sympathetic to the White Movement and even wealthy civilians. Since then, red guerrilla units have provoked the Japanese garrison. The red guerrillas gave the Japanese garrison an ultimatum to disarm. The Japanese garrison refused the ultimatum. This led to the armed conflict on March 12. The Japanese realized that they were dealing with a Red Army that did not recognize any agreements, and that Tryapitsyn wanted to provoke the Japanese into action with this ultimatum. And when the Red Army gave the Japanese garrison an ultimatum to disarm, Major Ishikawa, the Japanese garrison commander, refused. He launched a preemptive strike on 13 March. Tryapitsyn received two wounds in the surprise attack but was able to organize resistance, and after a fierce battle, the Japanese garrison was crushed in numbers, and the consul and all the staff died in the consulate set on fire by the guerrillas.

Survivor S. Strode described horrific piles of mutilated prisoner corpses found during the Japanese intervention. He searched through a heap of 350-400 bodies, recognizing many familiar faces like Kvasov and engineer Komarovsky, who showed signs of severe torture. He noted Komarovsky's twisted jaw and nose, and Vishnevsky with hands tied and chest bayoneted. Strode also saw a completely broken head of Michael Andrzhievsky, a Japanese soldier with a hanging tongue, and the shipowner Nazarov, eyes gouged out but with a laughing face. Many corpses, both male and female, were dismembered or had visible bayonet wounds to their genitals, and one woman had miscarried. Strode saw the undressed bodies of women like Pluzhnikova, Kukhterina, and Klavdia Meshcherinova. Chinese workers then used poles to push these corpses into an ice-hole with "gyrating laughter." A third pile of 75-100 bodies reportedly included Mrs. E. S. Lurie and engineer Kukushkin.

Another eyewitness reported that by March 11, 1920, prisons and detention facilities held around 630 arrestees (500 in prison, 80 at the militia, 50 in the brig). On March 12 and 13, partisans killed all Russians in these facilities, totaling over 600, mostly intellectuals. Arrests, searches, property confiscations, and murders continued daily. Victims were brutally killed with checkers, axes, bayonets, and logs, often by Red Army partisans specifically aiming to "kill at least one bourgeois."

The archives speak of the numerous sincere complaints of both Red Army Partisan and the newly born Soviet authorities in the affluent Siberian and Far Eastern regions about the bourgeoisie of the population, poorly enriched with a proletarian layer. The authorities assessed the composition of the urban population of Novonikolaevsk as petty-bourgeois and speculative. According to the assessment of the local revcom, half of the population of Pavlodar, Semipalatinsk province in 1920 was "counter-revolutionary Cossacks", and a third was bourgeoisie. Secretary of the Altai provincial committee of the RCP (b) Ya. R. Yelkovich noted in the spring of 1921 that "most of the population of the province was kulak peasantry". In March 1921, the staff of the Gosudolitohrana of the DVR characterized Zabaikalsk Nerchinsk as "a center of counterrevolution and speculation". D. S. Buzin (Beach) noted that Nikolaevsk-on-Amur's population primarily consisted of "fishermen, goldsmiths, steamship owners, speculative traders, and bourgeoisie officials," with very few workers or supporters of the revolution. But a native resident of the city wrote about the labor layer differently: in 1919, the booming fishing industry attracted "new entrepreneurs and masses of workers" to the city. However, the latter negatively perceived the Bolshevik agitation to join the Red Army Partisan, because they received good salaries and were afraid of the Japanese.

Tryapitsyn's personal and secret counterintelligence had control over everything, including the Investigative Committee, which was typical of the behavior of the leaders of large partisan units. For example, according to the testimony of A. A. Tabanakov, the former chief of counterintelligence who served in I. Y. Tretiak's Altai Mountain Division in the fall of 1919, this Bolshevik was the head of the Investigative Committee. This Bolshevik commissar hid in the mountains after the fall of the Soviets and, together with accomplices, carried out "robberies of the local population" until September 1919, then joined the guerrillas, having been given a very responsible Chekist post in Tretiak's division, which demonstrated the proximity of its holder to the leadership. Similar characters filled the functions of the secret police and Tryapitsyn. Having established a terrorist state commune, the Tryapitsyns went as far as possible along the path of social cleansing, deciding to undertake the total destruction of even the families of those who were "bourgeois", Jews, or simply "not their own". The "Deep Purge" was planned, carefully prepared, and carried out without the slightest hesitation.

Dr. Alexey Teplyakov comments that Tryapitsyn, an "erudite proletarian," relied on abundant criminal elements within his partisan units for social cleansing. This partisan terror, fueled by Chekists and active partisans, exhibited typical Bolshevik/anarchist traits: mass ruthlessness, destruction based on social and national grounds, and terror against "their own."

In the captured city for three months there existed the so-called Nikolaevskaya commune with all the necessary attributes: requisitions, confiscations, generalization of fishing gear, prohibition of trade and introduction of cards, and an emergency commission. The anarchist Tryapitsyn and the Socialist-Revolutionaries-Maximalist Lebedeva, having arrested and killed "their" Communists on suspicion of conspiracy, pursued - and in an extreme version - the policy of war communism, being officially recognized by Moscow. Tryapitsyn's inner circle consisted of persons with criminal backgrounds - Bitsenko, Budrin, Lapta, Otsevilli-Pavlutsky, and Sasov.

=== April and May ===
On April 4 and 5, 1920, the Japanese troops launched an all-out attack against the Bolsheviks in the Russian Far East. General Ōi Shigemoto led an all-out attack against the Bolsheviks. One of the factors that influenced Oi's decision was the Nikolayevsk-on-Amu clashed in March 1920. At that time, Japanese troops clashed with guerrillas commanded by Iakov Triapitsyn(who were Russian, Chinese and Koreans). And In addition, the Japanese government was at that time ordering the Japanese military to stop the ongoing guerrilla struggle of the Koreans in the Russian Far East. While attacking the local Bolsheviks, the Japanese captured many Korean politicians and fighters. And according to Bolshevik Petr Mikhailovich Nikiforov (who was in charge of the economic part of the Vladivostok coalition government), The actions of groups opposed to the buffer state in Vladivostok led to a full-scale attack by Japanese forces. According to Dr. Ivan Sablin, the extent to which Tokyo directed these attacks is unclear. However, the occupation of northern Sakhalin in the summer of 1920 was authorized by the Japanese government in retaliation for the Nikolayevsk-on-Amur massacre.

The armed intervention of the Japanese on 4–5 April 1920 dealt such a cruel blow to the Red forces that there was nothing to think about any serious response of the immediately scattered Red Army Partisan and the army of the Russian Far East. Japan saw the killing of the military garrison, the consul, and his family as sufficient grounds to send additional troops to the city and to occupy northern Sakhalin (opposite Nikolaevsk-on-Amur) indefinitely. Japanese units were sent from Khabarovsk to the mouth of the Amur, and warships approached the coast in May.

In the summer of 1920, Amur revcom prepared to withdraw from Blagoveshchensk in anticipation of a Japanese offensive. Amur revcom's plan at that time was as follows.

"hastily removed all valuables to a safe place and organized a conspiratorial troika consisting of the communists Bushuev and Nilander and the Socialists-Revolutionaries-maximalist S. Bobrinev, who were instructed to hastily work out a plan to destroy Blagoveshchensk. Bobrinev, who were instructed to hastily work out an evacuation plan and outline those fortified stone buildings which the Revkom intended to blow up in case of abandonment of the city, so that they would not be used by the Japanese! - He who is not with us is against us! This was the general mood of the revolutionary circles of Blagoveshchensk. No one felt sorry for the city, which was doomed to destruction, because it was decided that the entire Red labor population would go to the taiga with the partisans, and only the counter-revolutionary element could remain, to whom no stone would be left unturned...".

Blagoveshchensk survived, but during the panic retreat from Khabarovsk on 22 December 1921, the Bolsheviks, as the Whites noted, burned the railway station, "blew up the church[,] the hospital [and] many state and private houses[,] wagons [with] shells and other property." A member of the Dalbureau of the Central Committee of the RCP (b), V. A. Maslennikov wrote about the "unnecessary destruction" during the retreat of the Dobroflot steamships and the station: "A number of destruction of valuables made at Khabarovsk station also, of course, left a very depressing impression on the mood of the average citizen." Here Maslennikov also noted that "one had to imagine the indignation of the population", who learned about "unnecessary shooting of 22 arrested GPO when leaving the city".

Tryapitsyn, like all Red authorities, clearly divided the population under his control into "his own" and "bourgeois". The latter were subject to looting and selective extermination; active dissidents were killed and isolated, while the rest were usually subdued. On the eve of the collapse of the Nikolaev Commune, Tryapitsyn and his team maximized the contingent of socially and nationally alien people to be eliminated. According to K. A. Emelianov (who worked under Tryapitsyn as a clerk at the headquarters and knew well the documents of the "commune"), after receiving news of the approaching Japanese troops at a meeting of the revstab and the emergency commission at the suggestion of Tryapitsyn and Lebedeva

"... it was decided to burn the city to the ground, evacuate some of the inhabitants and destroy some of them. The Cheka received extraordinary powers to make not only mass arrests, but also executions. The chairman of the emergency committee was appointed peasant village Demidovka Mikhail Morozov, who received the uncontrolled right to dispose of the lives of Nikolayev's inhabitants. <...> At the same secret meeting they drew up lists of proscription, the material for which was the information requested in advance from all the commissariats. The order of mass murder was established as follows: in the first place were Jews and their families, in the second place were the wives and children of officers and soldiers, in the third place were designated all the families of persons previously arrested and killed by the verdicts of the tribunals or by orders of Tryapitsyn, in the fourth place were persons acquitted by the tribunal for any reason and released, as well as their families. The fifth were officials, commercial employees, artisans and some groups of workers who did not sympathize with the policy of the Red Staff. According to the lists drawn up, about three and a half thousand people were to be exterminated. For almost a month, approximately until May, the intensified work according to the planned plan continued. Those on the lists were systematically killed in small batches in a predetermined order. The executions were carried out by specially designated detachments of Russian Red Army partisans, Koreans and Chinese loyal to Tryapitsyn. Every night they went to the prison and killed a certain number of victims (30–40 people) according to a list. By that time there were about 1,500 people in the Nikolayev detention centers".

Tryapitsyn openly said that three quarters of the city's population consisted of counter-revolutionaries and lurking "creeps". Tryapitsyn and Lebedeva, shouting at meetings of the plenipotentiary military-revolutionary headquarters created by the regional executive committee on 13 May: "Terror! Terror without pity!", signed very eloquent documents with instructions to the heads of commissariats and institutions to hastily liquidate the enemies. For example: "Mandate to Pakhomov. You are urgently instructed to compile a list of persons to be eliminated. The revolutionary conscience is yours." Or the order of 24 May to the commander of the 1st Regiment: "The Military Revolutionary Staff orders you to carry out the death sentence on the arrested Japanese in the infirmary, as well as on the convicted persons in prison”. The peak of the terror came at the end of May.

Tryapitsyn's unit exterminated Jewish children and women during the purge. Children were destroyed along with their mothers, and women were raped before being executed. The guerrillas deliberately destroyed children as an unnecessary burden. Members of the Jewish community were taken by steamboat to the Amur River and drowned, young and old.

Ideologically, the children of the "bourgeois" were also considered "bourgeois" by the unit. In response to the question: "Did you say that it is necessary to destroy six-year-old children in the city[,] since there is not enough milk in the city?", the chairman of the Sakhalin Regional Executive Committee, F.V. Zhelezin, replied that he "He actually said that bourgeois children over the age of 12-13 are already incorrigibly harmful."

An elderly criminal and Red Army, Oska Krucheny (Osip Trubchaninov), when questioned about the sacking of Nikolaevsk-on-Amur, when asked if he participated in the murder of women and children, calmly replied: "Chopped. We're used to it."

The executions were carried out by specially designated squads of Russian Red Army partisans, Koreans and Chinese loyal to Tryapitsyn. Every night they went to the prison and killed a certain number of victims according to a list.

On 28 May, the Red Army partisans began to burn the surrounding area, destroying fishing villages opposite Nikolaevsk-on-Amur, and on 29 May - to burn dwellings and blow up large stone buildings of the regional center. In total 1,130 residential buildings were destroyed - almost 97% of all housing stock. Of the public buildings only the prison and the trade school survived. Tryapitsyn officially announced to the village revcoms: "The city is all burned. large buildings are blown up, the Japanese were left with only ashes. There is no stone left of Nikolaevsk". Loaded with looted goods, including half a ton of gold and many confiscated jewels, the partisans left the ashes. They fled up the Amgun River to the mining settlement of Kerby, setting fire to villages, mines and dredges and killing everyone along the way.

Tryapitsyn's unit retreated only after laying waste to the entire city, setting fire to wooden buildings and blowing up stone structures. In the last days of May and the first days of June 1920, on the orders of Tryapitsyn's headquarters, himself and a group of people close to him, the town of Nikolaevsk-on-Amur was blown up and burned, the surrounding fishing grounds along the coast were burned, the inhabitants of the town were destroyed according to the censorship of "trustworthiness" and social affiliation; surviving Japanese, who were kept as prisoners, as well as Red Army partisans who did not agree with Tryapitsyn's actions. As a result of the evacuation of part of the population to the taiga, almost all children under the age of 5 died.

The remaining population of the city retreated together, and they were taken out of the city by force. The survivors were taken by force by the Red Army through the taiga to the middle Amur (the so-called "Red Island"). A desolate ashes were left in the place of Nikolaevsk. The Red Army massacred thousands of Russians.

=== After the devastation of Nikolayevsk-on-Amur ===
The Red Terror did not stop with the destruction of Nikolayevsk. Civilian massacres took place during a march of several days through the taiga of nine thousand forcibly evacuated townspeople, when Red Army partisans, according to the memory of G. G. Milovanov, "rode on people on horseback," and weakened women and children were killed on the spot. Another eyewitness recalled: "Terrible atrocities were committed in Kerby. Armed men came at night and told us to evacuate. People were picked up and taken out of the village. No one came back. Without rifle fire, everyone was cut down with sabres. Bodies were floating down the river". Many bodies floated down the Amgun: "Women, children, and seldom men floated with cut off ears, noses, severed fingers, with slashed, stabbed bayonet wounds. It was forbidden to bury them."

As reported by M. V. Sotnikov-Goremyka "appointed a commission to examine the corked boxes and found money in papers, gold and silver, and gold earrings torn off along with earlobes. Protocols were drawn up for corpses fished out of lakes and rivers. Women had their breasts cut off, and men had their cores crushed. All the fished corpses had bare [scalped] skulls."

According to Dr. Alexey Teplyakov, the extermination of the families of those who had already suffered from the terror was practiced on the Don during the Raskazachivanie of 1919, and a little later - during the Chekist terror of 1920–1921 in the occupied Crimea. Thus, Tryapitsyn is one of the ideologists and practitioners of mass purges of the civilian population, including the deliberate extermination of children.

=== Wartime sexual violence ===
In Nikolayevsk, there was also brutal wartime sexual violence. Wartime sexual violence in the Russian Civil War had a cultural component. Traditionally, a conquering warrior had the right to rape the defeated. Irregular units were characterized by an increased propensity to violence of all kinds during the civil war. Some ethnographic peculiarities of the Trans-Ural peasants also contributed to the rampant sexual crime. It is known that in the Siberian village, there was an ancient custom among young people of gang rape of girls. Lack of respect for women and promiscuity of morals combined with class hatred bore their fruits. During the guerrilla years, mass rape was an omnipresent, grim reality. The rebels, who considered all women their legitimate prey, raped the wives of priests, civil servants, officers, and merchants, as well as nuns and teachers, but occasionally they willingly pounced on peasant women from neighboring villages. Mass rapes were characterized by the adventures of Y. Tryapitsyn's detachments (Sakhalin region), whose headquarters became the centers of mass rapes. The places of wartime sexual violence were the headquarters and Red Army partisans of Tryapitsyn. Tryapitsyn's unit in the captured village, accustomed to wartime rape, violated human rights. Tryapitsyn's unit in the captured village of Susanino herded all the girls into one room and raped them, then tried to burn their victims alive, but were repelled by other Red Army partisans.

Red Army partisans often raped minors, often killing them afterwards. The opera singer Vera Davydova survived Tryapitsyn's unit at the age of 14 and told Nikolaev local historian V.I. Yuzefov that after the evacuation she was immediately seized by a group of Red Army partisans, forcibly separated from her parents, for allegedly sending her to the "headquarters." Her mother's screams attracted one of the Red Army partisan leaders, who recognized her as his former teacher and intervened. Tryapitsyn's unit also sexually assaulted women during their hasty escape from Nikolaevsk-on-Amur. N.D. Kolesnikova recalled: "It was forbidden for girls from the age of 16 to leave Nikolaevsk with their families. They had to go through the taiga together with the Red Army partisans. Luckily for me, I was only 13 years old."

The pogrom in Nikolaevsk-on-Amur and the subsequent Tryapitsyn's unit atrocities led not only to rape but also to the murder of young women and girls. In the summer of 1920, many corpses, mostly women and children, were fished out of the Amgun River: "Women, children, and rarely men—with cut ears, noses, severed fingers, and slashed and stabbed bayonet wounds." One of the acts drawn up in the village of Udinskoye in early July 1920 recorded the discovery of the body of Mozgunova, a girl of 15–17 years of age, with eight dagger wounds in the chest area.

== Reactions from Chinese troops ==
On 2 May, the commander of the Soviet Russian army, Yakov Triapitsyn, Triapitsyn's aide, and others came to the Chinese consulate to ask the consulate and Captain Mao Chuicai (毛锤才) of the Li Sui for help. Captain Mao Chuicai refused Triapitsyn's request, but Triapitsyn threatened to destroy the entire village and expel the Chinese from Nikolayevsk if China did not provide assistance. Consul General Zhang Wenhuan (张文焕) and Captain Mao Chuicai had asked Triapitsyn not to torture the Japanese and to guarantee their lives in accordance with international law. Yakov Triapitsyn promised not to harm the prisoners, but Mao Chuicai and Zhang Wenhuan did not believe Triapitsyn's promise. Chuicai and Wenhuan requested a meeting with Triapitsyn to ensure the safety of the prisoners, but he refused to meet with them. Eventually, Triapitsyn broke his promise. On May 26, Triapitsyn burned the entire village and massacred not only the Japanese prisoners but also 4,000 Russians.

When the massacre took place, the Chinese garrison and Chinese consulate worked to ensure the safety of the prisoners and did not cooperate in any way with Triapitsyn's crimes.

== Criminal trials ==
Not far from the city, in the town of Kerbi, an uprising broke out. In a sudden raid by a Red Army partisans led by the chief of the regional police, I. T. Andreev, on the night of July 4, Tryapitsyn, along with 450 associates, were captured without resistance. A few days later, the felons in Tryapitsyn's unit as the by a hastily assembled 103-member court of Red Army partisans and local residents. Tryapitsyn was arrested, convicted, and executed on 9 July 1920, for the crime of undermining the confidence of the working people in the Communist regime. Khabarovsk authorities, with the help of loyal party members and Chekists, led the operation to eliminate Tryapitsyn. He was eliminated because he was hostile to the Far Eastern Republic and the Communist Party and a military provocation to the Japanese. One of the historians writes:

"Already in May 1920, the revolutionary headquarters in Khabarovsk decided to finish off Tryapitsyn and his headquarters. For this purpose, a detachment of 10 men was prepared with orders to arrest Tryapitsyn and his vile assistants, try them in a "people's court," and execute them as "traitors to the Soviet power. At the end of June, the Khabarovsk envoys snuck to Amgun. and got in touch with a group of partisans led by Andreev, who stood in opposition to Tryapitsyn."

A. A. Petrushin, who had access to the archives of the FSB, reports that the authorities, who learned about Tryapitsyn's arbitrariness,

"had to send to Priamurye the 'tamer of Siberian partisans'... Alexander Lepyokhin... Lepyokhin's Chekist special forces secretly seized the headquarters of the partisan Tryapitsyn and liquidated him along with his mistress Lebedeva-Kiyashko, atrocities no less than his friend."

On July 9, the seven main defendants were sentenced to death and shot immediately. A little later, on July 13, the rest of the active perpetrators were sentenced. A total of 133 people were tried, of whom 23 were shot, 33 were sentenced to imprisonment, 50 were released, and 27 cases were never considered. Chekist M. G. Morozov, Bitsenko's adjutant A. L. Fainberg, Bitsenko's bandit associates I. G. Zhivny, V. N. Burya, and V. Lobastov, regimental commanders, and power structure employees B. V. Amurov-Kozozozov were shot. V. Amurov-Kozodaev, L. V. Grakov, F. V. Kozodaev, M. S. Podoprigorov, F. I. Gorelov, A. S. Kozitsin, A. I. Ivanov, A. I. Volkov-Sokolov, I. D. Kulikov-Fyodorov, G. N. Konstantinov, K. I. Molodtsov. Molodtsov.

Some of the other perpetrators sentenced to imprisonment soon managed to escape to the guerrilla units operating in the area.

== Aftermath ==
=== Gradual withdrawal of Japanese forces ===
In the end, this gave Japan a pretext for a major armed intervention in Russian affairs (Japanese intervention throughout the Russian Far East, Japanese occupation of northern Sakhalin), although earlier, on 4 February 1920, the Japanese command had declared neutrality and on 17 February had begun to evacuate its troops from Russian territory.

=== Japanese occupation of Nikolaevsk-on-Amur ===
In mid-November 1921, the security officers of the DVR reported that "the Japanese are beginning to construct buildings in Nikolaevsk, and a large merchant SIMADO is building an Orthodox church." From the intelligence report of the DNRA headquarters of the DVR dated 3 August 1922, addressed to the GPU of the RSFSR, it follows that on July 15, the headquarters of the Japanese regiment stationed in Nikolaevsk-on-Amur received an order from the divisional headquarters to prepare for evacuation, in connection with which "the construction of houses [in] Nikolaevsk by the Japanese has been stopped."

=== Tryapitsyn's bandits ===
Some of Tryapitsyn's bandits remained in the region's power structures, which caused some concern among the DVR leadership. On 6 June 1921, the Dalbureau of the Central Committee of the RCP (b) decided to dismiss Vasily Ganimedov from the post of head of the Amguno-Kerbinsky district "as a ragamuffin." And in the fall of 1922, in the production of the Investigative Department of the Main Military Court of the NVRA and the Fleet of the DVR, was the case of the former chief of staff of the Military Commissioner of the Amguno-Kerbinsky mining district, P. G. Tenterev, accused of underreporting and complicity in the crimes of V. Ganimedov (Ganimedov himself, on 1 August 1922, was under arrest in the Military Department of the GPO of the DVR). However, at the same time, Tenterev was released on the surety of some high-ranking person.

=== The protagonists of the trial ===
Some of the protagonists of the trial were forced to flee Russia. I. T. Andreev went to Japan and China, and A.Z. Ovchinnikov went to the United States.

== Number of victims ==
The chairman of the Sakhalin People's Revolutionary Committee, G. Z. Prokopenko, wrote in late 1920 to the DVR government that "half of the region has been destroyed and half of the population wiped out and driven under the ice by the partisans."

At the trial, the guerrillas themselves spoke about the destruction of about half of the population of the region. By the beginning of 1920, the commune leaders estimated the number of inhabitants of the region at almost 30 thousand people. As a result of the Tryapitsyn massacre, the population of the Sakhalin region in 1920 was reduced, according to some sources, to 10 thousand people, and the region itself was soon liquidated, merging with the Primorskaya region. At the end of 1920, the leadership of the Sakhalin region determined the number of Russian population at 17 thousand, and the number of alien population at 1200 people. according to the assessment of the Sakhalin authorities - based on 18 thousand surviving population - the figure of losses in the whole region was at least 10-15 thousand people, including those who died of hunger and deprivation.

According to the Far Eastern Communists, there was a "Japanophile tendency among the peasantry" in the lower reaches of the Amur River, and then, along with the Japanese, almost half of the entire Russian population of the Sakhalin region was destroyed.

According to the official verdict, half of Sakhalin's population was wiped out by the Red Army.

Historians put the number of victims killed by the Red Army Partisan detachment under Yakov Tryapitsyn in Nikolaevsk in the thousands.

== Ties of the perpetrators to the Soviet government ==
Yakov Tryapitsyn found himself at the head of the expeditionary detachment sent to Nikolayevsk from the northern headquarters to ensure the implementation of the plan to use the resources of this region (manpower, food) for the continuation and development of guerrilla warfare in the Amur region. In January 1920 he declared himself commander of the Nikolayev front and received official recognition.

The anarchist Tryapitsyn and the Socialist-Revolutionaries-Maximalist Lebedeva, having arrested and killed "their" Communists on suspicion of conspiracy, pursued - and in an extreme version - the policy of war communism, being officially recognized by Moscow.

== Historiography ==
"Today, many historians agree in the description of Tryapitsyn's actions as unprecedented, baseless cruelty: "the intentional burning of an entire city, killing thousands killed with immeasurable ruins and devastation of the territory that had no parallels in thehistory of that war" (Nelyubova 2012, 291).

— Grishachev & Datsyshen 2019

The massacre of Russian civilians by Tryapitsyn's unit and the scorched earth policy by Tryapitsyn's unit is acknowledged by many historians, namely:

- Vladimir Prokhorovich Buldakov (2013),
- Vladimir Grigorievich Datsyshen (2014) (2019),
- Alexey Georgievich Teplyakov (2013) (2015) (2017) (2018),
- Alexander Alexeyevich Azarenkov (2019),
- Valery Vladimirovich Krivenky (2018) (2020),
- Ivan Sablin (2018),
- Li Chang (2016),
- Kurt Hackemer (1998),
- John J. Stephan (1994),
- Tatiana Linkhoeva (2018),
- Harold Henry Fisher (1935),
- and Ian R. Stone (1995).

== In popular culture ==
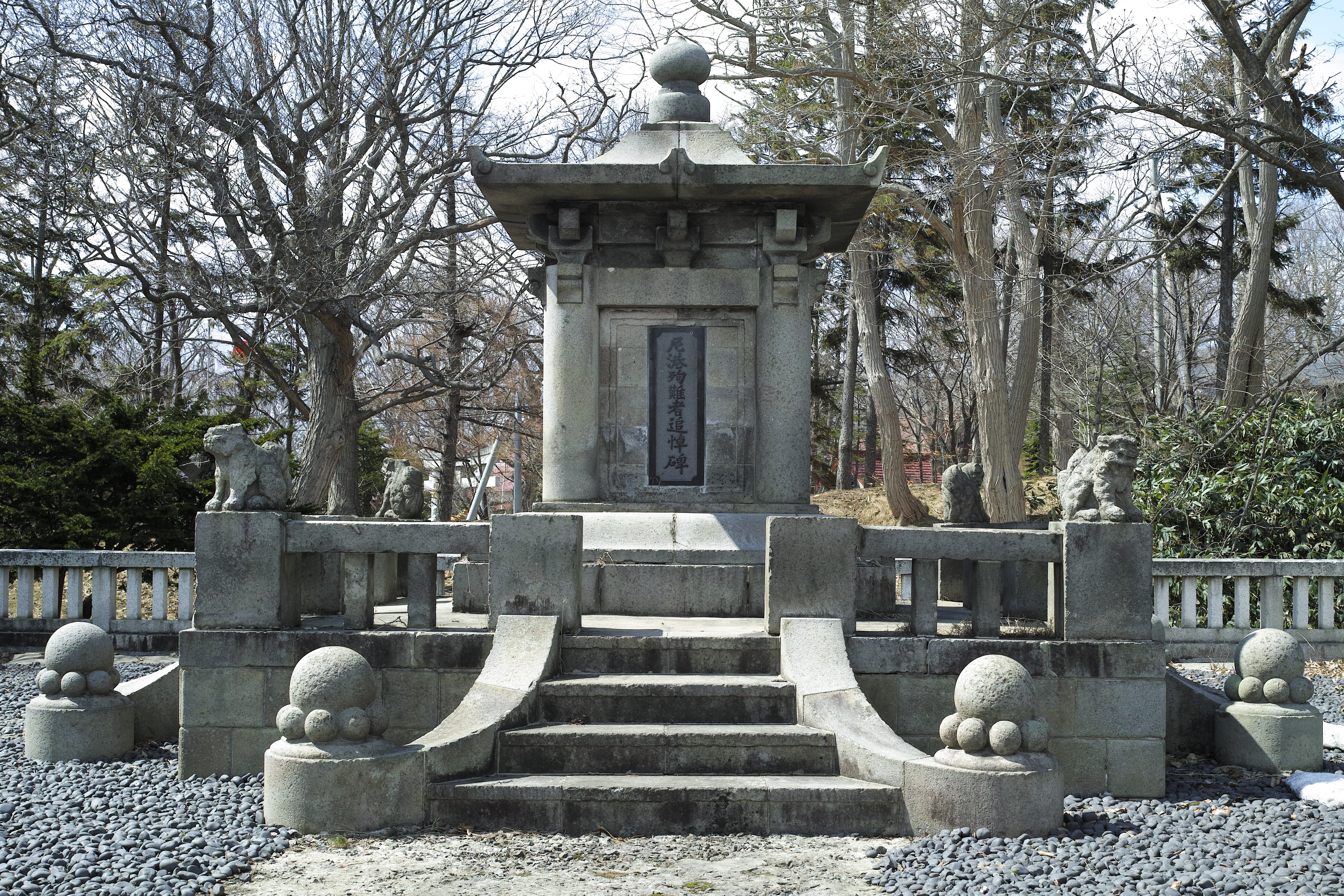
The memorial of Nikolayevsk Incident in Otaru, Hokkaido

At the time of the massacre, Japan emphasized and exaggerated the Japanese victims, but the majority of those killed by the Tryapitsyn units were Russians, not Japanese. However, Japan's misleading propaganda omitted thousands of Russians who made up the bulk of the victims massacred by the Red Army.

== See also ==
- Soviet war crimes
- Red Terror
