= Yakov Tryapitsyn =

Soviet general

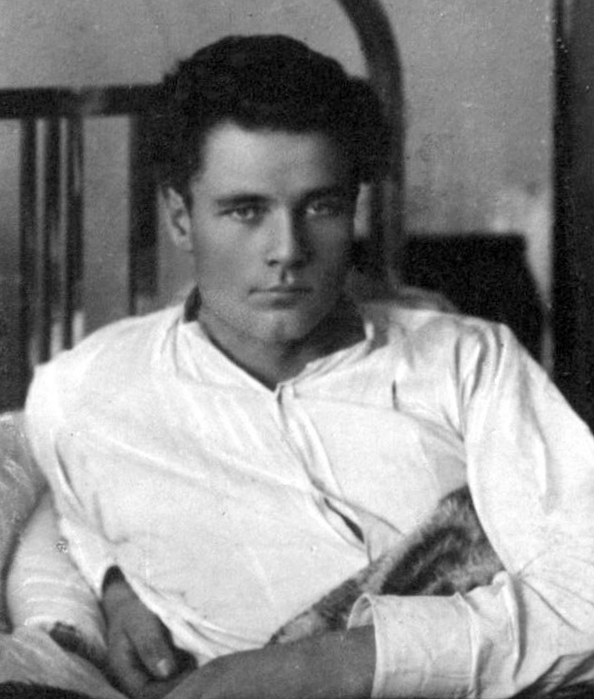
- Born: 25 April 1897; Muromsky Uyezd, Vladimir Governorate, Russian Empire
- Died: 9 July 1920 (aged 23); Kerbi, Primorskaya Region, Far Eastern Republic
- Cause of death: Execution by firing squad
- Military career
- Allegiance: Russian Empire; Russian SFSR; Far Eastern Republic
- Branch: (Russian Empire) Imperial Russian Army (Russian Soviet Federative Socialist Republic) Red Army; People's Revolutionary Army of the Far Eastern Republic
- Service years: 1916–1920
- Rank: (Russian Empire) Praporshchik; Partisan Commander (Russian Soviet Federative Socialist Republic) Front Commander (Far Eastern Republic) Front Commander
- Commands: Partisan Detachment (Russian Soviet Federative Socialist Republic) Nikolayevsk Front (Far Eastern Republic) Okhotsk Front
- Conflicts: World War I; Russian Civil War; Allied Intervention; Siberian Intervention; Eastern Front (executed)
- Awards: Cross of St. George

Yakov Ivanovich Tryapitsyn (Russian: Я́ков Ива́нович Тряпи́цын) (25 April 1897 – 9 July 1920) was a Russian and Soviet military and political figure. A wartime officer holding the rank of Praporshchik in the Imperial Russian Army during the First World War, he subsequently joined the Red Guards, and was appointed the Commander of the Nikolayevsk Front and the Nikolayevsk Military District of the Red Army of the Russian SFSR and the Okhotsk Front of the People's Revolutionary Army of the Far Eastern Republic. He took an active role in establishing Soviet power in Siberia and the Far East as a participant in the Civil War. He is best known for the role he played in the Nikolayevsk incident in 1920, in which he massacred the entire population of Nikolayevsk-on-Amur and burned the town to the ground.

Tryapitsyn then embarked on a reign of terror in the region, executing all civilians whom he deemed a threat. To conserve ammunition, one of the methods to execute the victims was to stab them with a bayonet and thrust them in a hole under the ice of the river Amur. Several thousand inhabitants of the town were killed in this manner and other methods. Following a hastily convened court-martial, Tryapitsin, his staff, regimental commanders, and the Chief of Staff of the Okhotsk Front, seven people in total, were executed. After a second trial, another 23 perpetrators were executed, while 33 received prison terms.

== Early life and career ==
Yakov Ivanovich Tryapitsin was born on 25 April 1897 in the village of Savasleyka in the Muromsky District of the Vladimir Province of the Russian Empire, in the family of a peasant, Ivan Stepanovich Sidorov-Tryapitsyn. He studied at the 4-year school, which he graduated from with a commendable record. In 1915 he entered the work of an assistant to the machinist on a locomotive in the factory's inner yard of the Mordovshchik shipyard.

In the summer of 1916, he was enlisted in the Kexholm Regiment of the Imperial Russian Army. He fought in the First World War - rose to the rank of Ensign (Praporshchik), and was twice awarded the Cross of St. George. In the spring of 1918, he was demobilized from the active army, in connection with the Peace of Brest-Litovsk, and upon returning to Russia, he joined the Red Guard.

He subsequently participated in the suppression of the Samara insurrection from June to October 1918. In the autumn of 1918, he was sent through the Eastern Front to Siberia.

== Partisan commander ==
At the end of 1918, traveling through Omsk, where he met with a fellow soldier, he left for Eastern Siberia and the Far East, according to the memoirs of the soldier to, "Fight for Soviet Power."

In January 1919, he was arrested in Irkutsk by Admiral Kolchak's forces, but managed to escape from prison. At the end of March of the same year, Tryapitsyn arrived in Vladivostok, where he joined an underground organization consisting of port loaders, who stocked up weapons and recruited volunteers to fight the Japanese interventionists supporting the White Movement. Under the leadership of Tryapitsyn, a raid was carried out on the Vladivostok military garrison depot, after which, fearing persecution, he fled with other underground workers into the taiga.

From the end of the spring of 1919 - he served in the Tsimikhinsky (Sucean) Partisan detachment, led by G.M. Shevchenko in Primorye, and engaged in combat with the Japanese, Americans, and White Russians near the town of Suchan. As a result of disagreements with the commander of the detachment, he left to the river Iman, where he organized his own Partisan detachment.

In the summer of 1919, he moved with his detachment to the Amur River, to the Khabarovsk District, where he continued his fight against the White Army and the intervening Allies. The operational area of the actions of the Partisan detachment, under his leadership, was in the district of the Kruglikovo and Verino stations of the Ussuri railway. On 2 and 3 November 1919, at a meeting of representatives of various Partisan detachments in the village of Anastasievka in the Khabarovsk District, it was decided to create a military revolutionary headquarters under the command of D.I. Boyko-Pavlov. Disagreeing with the decision by the assembled council, Tryapitsyn left Anastasievka before the arrival of the Red Army with his detachment of only 19 fighters.

Fulfilling his vow, on 10 November 1919, a detachment of Tryapitsyn consisting of 35 initial fighters began their march from Vyatka to Nikolayevsk-on-Amur. In the village of Malmyzh, a meeting was held with the Partisan detachment of Ocevilli-Pavlutsky. The former commander of this detachment, Mizin, became the first deputy of Tryapitsyn. On 26 November, the Partisan cavalry detachment near the Pulsa telegraph and postal station was ambushed by a punitive detachment of Kolchak's main force, and was defeated. After that, the White Guards moved to Zimmermanovka, where the main forces of the Partisan detachment of Tryapitsyn were concentrated.

During the defense of Zimmermanovka, the guerrillas, under the leadership of Tryapitsyn, routed the attackers. Pursuing the surviving White Guards, the Partisans took the village of Kalinovka. After learning of this defeat, the chief of the Nikolayevsk-on-Amur garrison, Colonel Medvedev, mobilized carts from the local population, assigned soldiers and volunteers, and sent a detachment to assist his beleaguered forces. Tryapitsyn left to engage in negotiations with the commanding officer of the White detachment, Colonel Witz. The appearance of the commander of the Partisan movement, from the position of Kolchak's men, and the transfer of letters and gifts from their relatives had a strong demoralizing effect on them. During the negotiations, Witz responded to Tryapitsyn with a refusal to surrender, but, realizing that his detachment was disintegrating, gave an order to retreat to De-Kastri Bay, as the road to Nikolayevsk was cut off. However, this order was carried out by only a few, the bulk of the soldiers subsequently defected to the side of the Partisans of Tryapitsyn. As a result, the Partisans detachment began to number about 1,400 soldiers.

== Command of the Nikolayevsk Front ==
In the village of Lyci, a council of Red Army commanders was convened, at which a number of decisions were taken on regarding the transformation of the Partisan army into a Front of the regular Red Army, subsequently known as the Nikolayevsk Front. The staff of the Red Army headquarters of the Nikolayevsk Front included Yakov I. Tryapitsyn as front commander, D.S. Buzin-Beach as deputy commander, T.B. Naumov-Medved as chief of staff, A.I. Pokrovsky-Cherny as staff secretary, and F.V. Zhelezin, A.I Komarov, and S.I Sheriy as senior staff members. It was this headquarters that began to reorganize Partisan detachments into regular regiments of the Red Army.

Since September 1918, Nikolayevsk was occupied by Japanese troops during the intervention in the Far East. By early 1920, in the city, in addition to the Russian population of around 15,000, and White detachments of about 300 men, a Japanese garrison of 350 men from the 14th Infantry Division of the Japanese Imperial Army under the command of Major Ishikawa was stationed, in addition to about 450 Japanese civilians.

On 10 February 1920, the soldiers and partisans of the Nikolayevsk Front, with the assistance of some former soldiers and officers of the former fortress of Chnyrra, who controlled the approaches to Nikolayevsk-on-Amur, captured and transferred it to the Sakhalin Revkom, together with its weapons. After the shelling of the positions of the Japanese units near Nikolayevsk from the guns captured by the Red Army in the fortress of Chnyrra, under the pressure of foreign consulates, the Japanese recalled the declaration of Lieutenant General Shiroodzu, commander of the 14th Japanese Infantry Division, on the observance by the Japanese army of neutrality in the civil war in Russia from 4 February 1920, and they sent representatives to the negotiations that took place on 25-28 February 1920. Two White Army officers were in attendance as observers: Captains Murgabov and Nemchinov. The Japanese were forced to sign an agreement on neutrality, on the basis of which parts of the Red Army entered the city. Under the agreement, parts of the Japanese Army were to maintain neutrality and remain in the places of their deployment.

At the funeral of 19 former Soviet and party officials who were arrested and executed by White and Japanese forces earlier that year, Tryapitsyn addressed a speech to the inhabitants of Nikolayevsk:

"You, the henchmen of capital and the defenders of bloodthirsty imperialism, who walked yesterday with white armbands, do not dream that you will be saved by the red bows attached today. Remember that secretly behind our back, you will not be able to work. Your kingdom has departed! You will no longer ride on the bent back of the worker and peasant. Go to those whose interests you have defended, because in our ranks you do not have a place. Remember you all, comrades, that only those who will work will eat. If you do not work, you do not eat!"

In the hands of the Extraordinary Commission (Cheka), were almost all documents of the White counterintelligence, with which nearly all employees implicated were arrested and subsequently shot. Those officials and representatives of the pre-revolutionary city council, who in 1918 signed a joint petition to the Japanese Emperor with the request to send troops to the Amur to aid them in defeating the Red Army were also arrested and executed.

On 12 March 1920, a congress of Soviets of the Sakhalin Region was held in Nikolayevsk-on-Amur, which marked the restoration of Soviet power in the whole region and enshrined the legal sovereignty of the Russian SFSR over the territory of Northern Sakhalin and the Lower Amur.

== Far Eastern Command ==
On 10 March 1920, Tryapitsyn issued an ultimatum to the Japanese garrison to voluntarily disarm and turn over their weapons and ammunition to the Red Army, to which he was sure the Japanese would refuse, giving the Red Army the excuse it needed to expel the garrison from the city. In the early morning hours of 12 March, however, Japanese soldiers launched an attack on the central command of the Nikolayevsk Front, stationed in Nikolayevsk-on-Amur. As a result of the sudden attack by the Japanese, Tryapitsyn himself was seriously wounded and received two injuries as a result, while his deputy, Mizin, and his chief of staff, T.B. Naumov, were both killed. At least 150 soldiers and commanders of the Nikolayevsk Front were killed and more than 500 soldiers were wounded. At the first stage of the fighting in the city, the initiative, thanks to the surprise attack and the loss of leadership by units of the Red Army, belonged to the Japanese garrison, which was supported by a large part of the Japanese population. But a day later, the Gorno-Amguno-Kerbinsk regiment, dislocated in the village of Kerbi, led by its commander, I.A Budrin, approached Nikolayevsk and assumed leadership of the fighting in the city.

The fighting lasted several days and ended with the victory of the Red Army. By the evening of 14 March, the main forces of the Japanese were defeated, and on 15 March at noon the last group capitulated, only surrendering when the Japanese High Command ordered them to do so. Most of the Japanese died in battle, while 117 soldiers and 11 women were taken prisoner. Even so, Tryapitsyn decided to take revenge, which resulted in the execution of the surviving garrison along with many Japanese civilians. After this, Tryapitsyn was free to start a reign of terror and execute all those he deemed dangerous to his forces. Among foreign citizens, the British manager of one of the largest fisheries in the town was arrested and shot on the charges of counter-revolutionary activity.

Tryapitsyn believed that the attack on the Red Army in Nikolayevsk was in fact a rehearsal for Japan for the coordinated attack of its occupying forces in the Russian Far East on Soviet authorities and military garrisons of the Far East. During the formation of the Far Eastern Republic, Tryapitsyn expressed his disagreement with this decision. From a telegram to Moscow:

"It has become clear to us that you are absolutely incorrectly informed about the situation here, and would like to ask who informed you about the situation here, as well as to Moscow, which passed a resolution on the buffer state in the Far East, the creation of which is absolutely not advisable ... You indicate, that the goal is the creation of such a state that Japan can recognize, therefore, a state not of the Soviet, but secretly acting at the direction of the Central Committee. How absurd this was for us, it was quite clear from the first moment. First of all, the state is, if it is Zemstvo, not Soviet, can not conduct the policy of the Soviets, and during its existence has clearly revealed the policy of the White Guard, which is proved by the events in Khabarovsk and Vladivostok; the second is that the Japanese would not allow the Soviet buffer policy and immediately it would be noticed, and such accusations from them already were, they pointed out that under the screen of the Zemstvo, the Bolsheviks nest; and it is possible that this motive is also one of the reasons for their speech, namely, to destroy the Soviet elements, and they achieved this ... thinking of avoiding a clash with Japan and ending occupation by peaceful means, you expected that Japan, having recognized Zemstvo, would abandon occupation objectives and will leave a similar pozdorovu. The Japanese are inferior only in force. And you achieved exactly the opposite results, instead of getting rid of the Japanese, the state gave us an even more bitter war, even more; you ruined the already prepared victory of the Red Army in the East by your stupid buffer, for I dare to assure you that if it had not been for the provocation of the buffers and Zemstvos, then the Japanese, under the pressure of our forces, would have left from everywhere, as they left the Amur Region and Nikolayevsk."

Despite the vehement disagreements of Tryapitsyn with the decision to establish the Far Eastern Republic, on 22 April 1920, according to the order No. 66 of the Commander-in-Chief of the People's Revolutionary Army, he was appointed Commander of the Okhotsk Front. By the same order, Sergey Lazo was appointed commander of the Primorsky Front.

== Nikolayevsk incident and death ==
In late May, as a Japanese relief expedition approached, Tryapitsyn ordered the evacuation of all Red Army soldiers, staff, and Soviet personnel from the city, and subsequently executed all of the remaining inhabitants of the town, both Japanese and Russian, including children and the elderly, and burned the town to the ground. All Japanese still in Nikolayevsk were massacred. Being short with ammunition, one of the methods to execute the victims was to stab them with a bayonet and thrust them in a hole under the ice of the river Amur. Several thousand inhabitants of the town were killed in this fashion and many others were beaten to death with rifles. Hundreds of others were shot on the banks of the Amur. The buildings of the town were set on fire or blown up with explosives following the massacre, as well as the fortress of Chnyrra and any weapons, artillery, ammunition, medical supplies, and provisions that could not be secured by the Red Army. Following the retreating army along the banks of the Amur River, on 3 June 1920, Tryapitsin left with his staff.

Upon learning of the massacre, the Japanese government lodged a protest against the Bolshevik government in Moscow, demanding compensation. Tryapitsin had already lost much of his favor with the Central Committee in Moscow due to his frequent railings against Soviet policy and criticism of the central government, and in response to the Japanese demands, Tryapitsin, along with his regimental commanders and entire staff, was arrested in the town of Kerbi in Primorsky on the orders of the Soviet government on 7 July. I.T. Andreev, a member of the Bolshevik-aligned Central Committee of the Sakhalin Region and a former White Army officer, presided over a brief improvised trial in which Tryapitsin, his staff, regimental commanders, and the Chief of Staff of the Okhotsk Front, Nina Lebedeva, were condemned to death and subsequently shot on 9 July. Even so, the Japanese government felt that this was not sufficient, and used the incident as an excuse to occupy the northern half of Sakhalin island, and to delay diplomatic recognition of the Soviet Union until 1925.
