= Government Printing Office (disambiguation) =

Government Printing Office may refer to:

Organisations

- United States Government Publishing Office, formerly known as the United States Government Printing Office
- Australian Government Publishing Service, formerly known as the Australian Government Printing Office

Other

- Government Printing Office Workers, a set of sculptures at the United States Government Publishing Office
- Queensland Government Printing Office, a heritage-listed government building in Brisbane, Australia
