= Harold Henry Fisher =

American historian (1890–1975)

Harold Henry Fisher (1890–1975) was a US historian specializing in Russian history.

Fisher was born in Morristown, Vermont; he received an AB from the University of Vermont in 1911. He served as a field artillery captain during World War I, and was appointed chief of the Historical Department of American Relief Administration during the post-war famine in Eastern Europe and Russia. His collection of Tsarist and Bolshevik documents subsequently became a permanent part of the Hoover Institution's holdings.

Fisher became a lecturer at Stanford University in 1924. He was later named Curator of the American Relief Administration Archives (1924–1934), Secretary of the Directors (1925–1930), Director of the Russian Revolution Institute (1929–1940), Vice-chairman of the Directors (1931–1943), Chairman of the Directors (1943–1952), and chairman of the advisory board (1952–1955). After World War II he served the United Nations in various advisory capacities. He retired from Stanford in 1955, but went on to serve as a visiting professor at the University of California at Berkeley, San Francisco State College, Columbia University, and Tokyo University. The Hoover Institution established the Harold H. Fisher Endowment Fund in 1969; its purpose was the collection of documents relating to the history, economy, and politics of the Soviet Union and Eastern Europe.

Non-profit organization positions
Preceded by Ralph Haswell Lutz	Director of the Hoover Institution; 1944–1952	Succeeded by Charles Easton Rothwell
