= Minister of Defence (Soviet Union) =

Soviet government minister

Minister of Defence of the Soviet Union
- Министр обороны СССР
- Standard of the Minister of Defence (1964–1991)

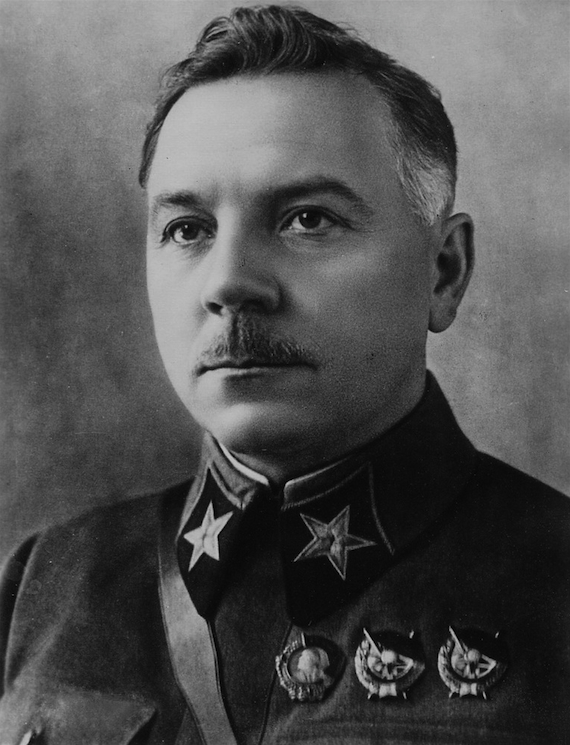
- Longest serving Kliment Voroshilov; 6 November 1925 – 7 May 1940
- Ministry of Defense
- Status: Abolished
- Reports to: General Secretary; Premier
- Nominator: Council of Defence
- Appointer: Politburo
- Precursor: Minister of War (Russian Empire)
- Formation: 8 November 1917
- First holder: Council on War and Navy Affairs
- Final holder: Yevgeny Shaposhnikov
- Abolished: 14 February 1992
- Succession: Commander-in-Chief of the CIS Armed Forces (1992–1993); Minister of Defence (Russian Federation)

The Minister of Defence of the Soviet Union (Russian: Министр обороны СССР) refers to the head of the Ministry of Defence who was responsible for defence of the Russian Soviet Federative Socialist Republic from 1917 to 1922 and the Soviet Union from 1922 to 1992.

== People's Commissars for Military and Naval Affairs (1917–1934) ==
No.	Portrait	People's Commissar for Military and Naval Affairs	Took office	Left office	Time in office
1	Council	Council (Note: The council of the Petrograd Military Revolutionary Committee consisted of Vladimir Antonov-Ovseenko, Pavel Dybenko, and Nikolai Krylenko. On 10 November 1917 Ovseenko was taken hostage during the Petrograd Junker mutiny and was released next day with the help of American journalist Williams. Later Ovseenko headed the Petrograd Military District until December when he was dispatched to Ukraine. Dybenko continued to supervise the naval affairs as the Supreme Navy College that was formed sometime in late November. He stayed in charge until 16 March 1918 when he was stripped of all posts and revoked membership in the Bolshevik Party due to desertion. On 25 November 1917 Krylenko was appointed the Supreme Commander-in-Chief of the Red Army.)	8 November 1917	15 November 1917	7 days
2	Nikolai Podvoisky	Nikolai Podvoisky (1880–1948)	15 November 1917	13 March 1918	118 days
3	Leon Trotsky	Leon Trotsky (1879–1940)	14 March 1918	25 January 1925	6 years, 317 days
4	Mikhail Frunze	Mikhail Frunze (1885–1925)	25 January 1925	31 October 1925 †	279 days
5	Kliment Voroshilov	Kliment Voroshilov (1881–1969)	6 November 1925	20 June 1934	8 years, 232 days

== People's Commissars of Defense (1934–1946) ==
No.	Portrait	People's Commissar of Defense	Took office	Left office	Time in office
1	Kliment Voroshilov	Marshal of the Soviet Union; Kliment Voroshilov (1881–1969)	20 June 1934	7 May 1940	5 years, 322 days
2	Semyon Timoshenko	Marshal of the Soviet Union; Semyon Timoshenko (1895–1970)	7 May 1940	19 July 1941	1 year, 73 days
3	Joseph Stalin	Marshal of the Soviet Union; Joseph Stalin (1878–1953)	19 July 1941	25 February 1946	4 years, 221 days

== People's Commissars of the Navy (1937–1946) ==
No.	Portrait	People's Commissar of the Navy	Took office	Left office	Time in office
1	Pyotr Smirnov	Army Commissar of 1st rank Pyotr Smirnov (1897–1939)	30 December 1937	30 June 1938	182 days
2	Mikhail Frinovsky	Komandarm 1st rank Mikhail Frinovsky (1898–1940)	8 September 1938	20 March 1939	193 days
3	Nikolai Kuznetsov	Vice Admiral; Nikolai Kuznetsov (1904–1974)	28 April 1939	25 February 1946	6 years, 303 days

== People's Commissar for the Armed Forces (1946) ==
No.	Portrait	People's Commissar for the Armed Forces	Took office	Left office	Time in office
1	Joseph Stalin	Marshal of the Soviet Union; Joseph Stalin (1878–1953)	25 February 1946	15 March 1946	18 days

== Ministers of the Armed Forces (1946–1950) ==
No.	Portrait	Minister of the Armed Forces	Took office	Left office	Time in office
1	Joseph Stalin	Marshal of the Soviet Union; Joseph Stalin (1878–1953)	15 March 1946	3 March 1947	353 days
2	Nikolai Bulganin	Marshal of the Soviet Union; Nikolai Bulganin (1895–1975)	3 March 1947	24 March 1949	2 years, 21 days
3	Aleksandr Vasilevsky	Marshal of the Soviet Union; Aleksandr Vasilevsky (1895–1977)	24 March 1949	25 February 1950	338 days

== Minister of War (1950–1953) ==
No.	Portrait	Minister of War	Took office	Left office	Time in office
1	Aleksandr Vasilevsky	Marshal of the Soviet Union; Aleksandr Vasilevsky (1895–1977)	25 February 1950	15 March 1953	3 years, 18 days

== Ministers of the Navy (1950–1953) ==
No.	Portrait	Minister of the Navy	Took office	Left office	Time in office
1	Ivan Yumashev	Admiral; Ivan Yumashev (1895–1972)	25 February 1950	20 July 1951	1 year, 145 days
2	Nikolai Kuznetsov	Admiral of the Fleet of the Soviet Union; Nikolai Kuznetsov (1904–1974)	20 July 1951	15 March 1953	1 year, 238 days

== Ministers of Defence (1953–1992) ==
No.	Portrait	Minister of Defence	Took office	Left office	Time in office	Leader	Premier
1	Nikolai Bulganin	Marshal of the Soviet Union; Nikolai Bulganin (1895–1975)	15 March 1953	9 February 1955	1 year, 331 days	Georgy Malenkov; Nikita Khrushchev	Georgy Malenkov
2	Georgy Zhukov	Marshal of the Soviet Union; Georgy Zhukov (1896–1974) (Note: Dismissed by Nikita Khrushchev in the aftermath of the Anti-Party Group affair.)	9 February 1955	26 October 1957	2 years, 259 days	Nikita Khrushchev	Nikolai Bulganin
3	Rodion Malinovsky	Marshal of the Soviet Union; Rodion Malinovsky (1898–1967)	26 October 1957	31 March 1967 †	9 years, 156 days	Nikita Khrushchev; Leonid Brezhnev	Nikolai Bulganin; Nikita Khrushchev; Alexsei Kosygin
4	Andrei Grechko	Marshal of the Soviet Union; Andrei Grechko (1903–1976)	12 April 1967	26 April 1976 †	9 years, 14 days	Leonid Brezhnev	Alexsei Kosygin
5	Dmitry Ustinov	Marshal of the Soviet Union; Dmitry Ustinov (1908–1984)	30 July 1976	20 December 1984 †	8 years, 143 days	Leonid Brezhnev; Yuri Andropov; Konstantin Chernenko	Alexsei Kosygin; Nikolai Tikhonov
6	Sergei Sokolov	Marshal of the Soviet Union; Sergei Sokolov (1911–2012) (Note: Dismissed by Mikhail Gorbachev as a result of the Mathias Rust affair.)	22 December 1984	29 May 1987	2 years, 158 days	Konstantin Chernenko; Mikhail Gorbachev	Nikolai Tikhonov; Nikolai Ryzhkov
7	Dmitry Yazov	Marshal of the Soviet Union; Dmitry Yazov (1924–2020) (Note: Dismissed by Mikhail Gorbachev for being a member of the GKChP during the 1991 coup attempt.)	30 May 1987	28 August 1991	4 years, 90 days	Mikhail Gorbachev	Nikolai Ryzhkov; Valentin Pavlov
8	Yevgeny Shaposhnikov	Marshal of Aviation; Yevgeny Shaposhnikov (1942–2020) (Note: On 14 February 1992, by the decision of the Council of CIS Heads of State, Marshal Yevgeny Shaposhnikov was appointed Commander-in-Chief of the United Armed Forces of the CIS.)	29 August 1991	14 February 1992	169 days	Mikhail Gorbachev (until Dec. 1991)	Ivan Silayev

== See also ==
- College of War
- Ministry of War of the Russian Empire
- List of heads of the military of Imperial Russia
- Ministry of Defense (Soviet Union)
- Ministry of Defense Industry (Soviet Union)
- Ministry of Defence (Russia)
- General Staff of the Armed Forces of the Russian Federation
  - Chief of the General Staff (Russia)
- Cheget
