= Medvedki =

Medvedki (Russian: Медведки) is the name of several rural localities in Russia.

== Arkhangelsk Oblast ==
As of 2022, one rural locality in Arkhangelsk Oblast bears this name:

- Medvedki, Arkhangelsk Oblast, a village in Votlazhemsky Selsoviet of Kotlassky District

== Ivanovo Oblast ==
As of 2022, one rural locality in Ivanovo Oblast bears this name:

- Medvedki, Ivanovo Oblast, a village in Puchezhsky District

== Kaluga Oblast ==
As of 2022, one rural locality in Kaluga Oblast bears this name:

- Medvedki, Kaluga Oblast, a village in Meshchovsky District

== Kostroma Oblast ==
As of 2022, four rural localities in Kostroma Oblast bear this name:

- Medvedki, Ostrovsky District, Kostroma Oblast, a village in Klevantsovskoye Settlement of Ostrovsky District
- Medvedki, Severnoye Settlement, Susaninsky District, Kostroma Oblast, a village in Severnoye Settlement of Susaninsky District
- Medvedki, Severnoye Settlement, Susaninsky District, Kostroma Oblast, a village in Severnoye Settlement of Susaninsky District
- Medvedki, Sumarokovskoye Settlement, Susaninsky District, Kostroma Oblast, a village in Sumarokovskoye Settlement of Susaninsky District

== Moscow Oblast ==
As of 2022, two rural localities in Moscow Oblast bear this name:

- Medvedki, Istrinsky District, Moscow Oblast, a village in Yadrominskoye Rural Settlement of Istrinsky District
- Medvedki, Volokolamsky District, Moscow Oblast, a village in Ostashevskoye Rural Settlement of Volokolamsky District

== Oryol Oblast ==
As of 2022, one rural locality in Oryol Oblast bears this name:

- Medvedki, Oryol Oblast, a village in Medvedkovsky Selsoviet of Bolkhovsky District

== Smolensk Oblast ==
As of 2022, five rural localities in Smolensk Oblast bear this name:

- Medvedki, Demidovsky District, Smolensk Oblast, a village under the administrative jurisdiction of Demidovskoye Urban Settlement of Demidovsky District
- Medvedki, Kholm-Zhirkovsky District, Smolensk Oblast, a village in Tupikovskoye Rural Settlement of Kholm-Zhirkovsky District
- Medvedki, Novoduginsky District, Smolensk Oblast, a village in Izvekovskoye Rural Settlement of Novoduginsky District
- Medvedki, Sychyovsky District, Smolensk Oblast, a village in Bekhteyevskoye Rural Settlement of Sychyovsky District
- Medvedki, Ugransky District, Smolensk Oblast, a village in Rusanovskoye Rural Settlement of Ugransky District

== Tula Oblast ==
As of 2022, three rural localities in Tula Oblast bear this name:

- Medvedki, Chernsky District, Tula Oblast, a village in Fedorovskaya Rural Administration of Chernsky District
- Medvedki, Leninsky District, Tula Oblast, a selo in Aleshinsky Rural Okrug of Leninsky District
- Medvedki, Venyovsky District, Tula Oblast, a selo in Gatsky Rural Okrug of Venyovsky District

== Vologda Oblast ==
As of 2022, one rural locality in Vologda Oblast bears this name:

- Medvedki, Vologda Oblast, a village in Krasavinsky Selsoviet of Velikoustyugsky District

== Yaroslavl Oblast ==
As of 2022, two rural localities in Yaroslavl Oblast bear this name:

- Medvedki, Danilovsky District, Yaroslavl Oblast, a village in Shagotsky Rural Okrug of Danilovsky District
- Medvedki, Tutayevsky District, Yaroslavl Oblast, a village in Metenininsky Rural Okrug of Tutayevsky District
