= Nikolai Kuznetsov (admiral) =

Soviet naval officer (1904–1974)

- Никола́й Кузнецо́в
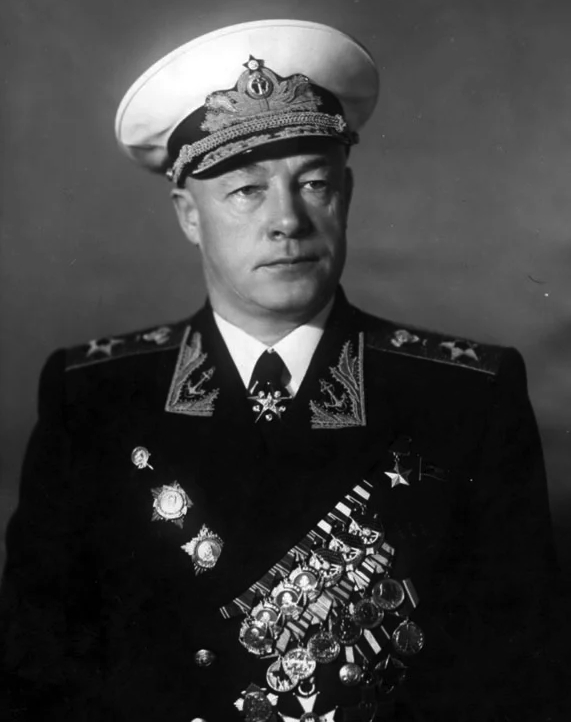

Commander-in-Chief of the Navy
- In office 15 March 1953 – 5 January 1956
- President: Kliment Voroshilov
- Prime Minister: Georgy Malenkov; Nikolai Bulganin
- General Secretary: Georgy Malenkov; Nikita Khrushchev
- Preceded by: Himself (as Minister of the Navy)
- Succeeded by: Sergey Gorshkov
- In office 25 February 1946 – 17 January 1947
- President: Mikhail Kalinin; Nikolai Shvernik
- Prime Minister: Joseph Stalin
- General Secretary: Joseph Stalin
- Preceded by: Himself (as People’s Commissar for the Navy)
- Succeeded by: Ivan Yumashev

Minister of the Navy
- In office 20 July 1951 – 15 March 1953
- President: Nikolai Shvernik
- Prime Minister: Joseph Stalin
- General Secretary: Joseph Stalin; Georgy Malenkov
- Preceded by: Ivan Yumashev
- Succeeded by: Himself; Nikolai Bulganin (Defense Minister)

People’s Commissar for the Navy
- In office 28 April 1939 – 25 February 1946
- President: Mikhail Kalinin
- Prime Minister: Vyacheslav Molotov; Joseph Stalin
- General Secretary: Joseph Stalin
- Preceded by: Mikhail Frinovsky
- Succeeded by: Office Abolished

Personal details
- Born: 24 July 1904 Medvedki, Russian Empire
- Died: 6 December 1974 (aged 70) Moscow, Russian SFSR, Soviet Union
- Party: Communist Party of the Soviet Union (1924–1956)

Military service
- Allegiance: Russian SFSR (1919–1922); Soviet Union (1922–1956)
- Branch/service: Soviet Navy
- Years of service: 1919–1956
- Rank: Admiral of the Fleet of the Soviet Union
- Commands: 5th Fleet (1950–1951); Pacific Fleet (1938–1939); Cruiser Chervona Ukraina (1933–1936)
- Battles/wars: Spanish Civil War; World War II; Winter War; Black Sea campaigns

Nikolai Gerasimovich Kuznetsov (Russian: Никола́й Гера́симович Кузнецо́в; 24 July 1904 – 6 December 1974) was a Soviet naval officer who achieved the rank of Admiral of the Fleet of the Soviet Union and served as People's Commissar of the Navy during the Winter War and the Second World War. The Kuznetsov Naval Academy and the lead ship of the Kuznetsov-class aircraft carrier are named in his honor.

== Biography ==
=== Early years and career ===
Kuznetsov was born in a peasant family of Serbian paternal ancestry, in the village of Medvedki, Velikoustyuzhsky Uyezd, Vologda Governorate, Russian Empire (now in Kotlassky District of Arkhangelsk Oblast, Russia).

In 1919, Kuznetsov joined the Northern Dvina Naval Flotilla, having added two years to his age to make himself eligible to serve. In 1920, he was stationed at Petrograd and in 1924, as a member of a naval unit, he attended the funeral ceremony of Vladimir Lenin.

That same year, he joined the Communist Party.

Upon graduation from the Frunze Higher Naval School in 1926, Kuznetsov served on the cruiser Chervona Ukraina, first as watch officer and then as First Lieutenant. In 1932, he graduated from the Naval College after studying operational tactics. Upon graduation, he was offered two options – a desk job with the general staff or a command post on a ship.

Kuznetsov successfully applied for the post of executive officer on the cruiser Krasnyi Kavkaz. Within a year, the young officer earned his next promotion. In 1933, he returned to the Chervona Ukraina, this time as her commander. Under Kuznetsov, the ship became an outstanding example of discipline and organization, quickly drawing attention to her young captain.

From 5 September 1936 to 15 August 1937, Kuznetsov served as the Soviet naval attaché and chief naval advisor to Republican Spain. During his time advising the Republican side in the Spanish Civil War, Kuznetsov developed a strong dislike of fascism.

On returning home on January 10, 1938, he was promoted to the rank of flag officer, 2nd rank, and given command of the Pacific Fleet. While in this position, he came face to face with Stalin's purge of the military. Kuznetsov himself was never implicated, but many of the officers under his command were. Kuznetsov resisted the purges at every step, and his intervention saved the lives of many Soviet officers.

On 28 April 1939, Kuznetsov, still only thirty-four, was appointed the People's Commissar (Minister) of the Navy, a post he would hold throughout the Second World War until 1946. In 1939, despite Stalin's negative attitude to the Nikolaevsky Engineering Academy, Nikolay Gerasimovich Kuznetsov ordered the return of the Naval Engineering faculty from Moscow to Leningrad, and set up the Military Engineering-Technical University to educate engineers for the construction of naval bases.

=== The Second World War ===
Kuznetsov played a crucial role during the first hours of the war – at this pivotal moment, his resolve and blatant disregard for orders averted the destruction of the Soviet Navy. By June 21, 1941, Kuznetsov was convinced of the inevitability of war with Nazi Germany. On the same day Semyon Timoshenko and Georgy Zhukov issued a directive prohibiting Soviet commanders from responding to "German provocations". The Navy, however, constituted a distinct ministry (narkomat), and thus Kuznetsov held a position which was technically outside the direct chain of command. He utilized this fact in a very bold move.

According to Nicholas G. Shadrin, the Soviet Navy had been alerted to readiness state No. 2 on 19 June 1941 and, by Kuznetsov's order, was placed in readiness state No. 1 at 23:35 on 21 June. At 3:15 am that same morning, the Wehrmacht began Operation Barbarossa.[1] Shadrin states that, despite German air strikes on Sevastopol and Baltic Fleet naval bases on 22 June, no Soviet ships were lost on the first day of the war.

In the following two years, Kuznetsov's primary concern was the protection of the Caucasus from a German invasion. Throughout the war, the Black Sea remained the primary theater of operations for the Soviet Navy. During the war years, Kuznetsov honed Soviet methods of amphibious assault. A notable subordinate in the Black Sea and in command of the Azov Flotilla was S.G. Gorshkov who would later succeed him as Commander-in-Chief of the Navy. In May 1944 he was given the rank of Admiral of the Fleet – a newly created position initially equated to that of a four-star general. In the same year, Kuznetsov was given the title of Hero of the Soviet Union. On May 31, 1945, his rank was equated to the rank of Marshal of the Soviet Union with a similar insignia. In August 1945, he took part in Operation August Storm in the Far East, helping to provide support for the Soviet Navy fleet under Commander-in-Chief of USSR Forces in the Far East Marshal Aleksandr Vasilevsky.

=== The first fall ===
From 1946 to 1947 he was the Deputy Minister of the USSR Armed Forces and Commander-in-chief of the Naval Forces.

In 1947 he was removed from his post on Stalin's orders and in 1948 he, as well as several other admirals were put on trial by the Naval Tribunal. Kuznetsov was demoted to Vice admiral, while the other admirals received prison sentences of varying length.

In 1951 Stalin ended Kuznetsov's pariah status, once again placing him in command of the Navy (as the Minister of the Navy of the USSR), but without restoring his military rank, which was returned to him upon Stalin's death in 1953. In the same year, he became the First Deputy Minister of Defense of the USSR. In 1955, Kuznetsov was made Commander-in-Chief of the Naval Forces. His rank was raised to Admiral of the Fleet of the Soviet Union and he was awarded the Marshal's star.

=== The second fall and retirement ===
His newfound prominence brought him into direct conflict with now Defense Minister Marshal Zhukov, with whom he had clashed during the war years. On December 8, 1955, using the loss of the battleship Novorossiysk as a pretext, Zhukov removed the Admiral from his post. The commission that inspected the ship's loss was headed by Vyacheslav Malyshev and its findings were used by Zhukov to blame Kuznetsov. In February 1956 he was again demoted to the rank of vice-admiral, retired and expressly forbidden "any and all work connected with the navy."

During his retirement he wrote and published many essays and articles, as well as several longer works, including his memoirs and an officially sanctioned book, "With a Course for Victory", which dealt with the Patriotic War. His memoirs, unlike those of many other prominent leaders, were written by him personally and are noted for their style.

Kuznetsov also authored several books on the war, on Stalin's repressions, and on the navy which were published posthumously. In these he was highly critical of the Party's interference in the internal affairs of the military, and insisted that "the state must be ruled by law."

=== Rehabilitation and legacy ===
After the retirement of Zhukov in 1957, and of Khrushchev in 1964, a group of naval veterans began a campaign addressed to the Soviet leadership to restore Kuznetsov's rank, with all benefits, and to make him one of the General Inspectors of the Ministry of Defence. Not until July 26, 1988, under Andrey Gromyko did the Presidium of the Supreme Soviet of the USSR reinstate Kuznetsov to his former rank of Admiral of the Fleet of the Soviet Union. Kuznetsov is now recognized as one of the most prominent men in the history of the Soviet and, today, of the Russian Navy. In recognition, the Russian Navy's largest surface warship, its only remaining aircraft carrier, is named in his honor.

=== Death ===
Kuznetsov died on 6 December 1974 in Moscow, at the age 70, and was buried with full military honors at the Novodevichy Cemetery.

== See also ==
- Kuznetsov-class aircraft carrier
  - Admiral Kuznetsov
- Marko Voinovich
- Marko Ivelich
- Matija Zmajević
- Nikolai Dabić

Military offices
Preceded by Himself (as Minister of the Navy)	Commander-in-Chief of the Soviet Navy; 1953–1956	Succeeded by Sergey Gorshkov
Preceded by Himself (as People’s Commissar for the Navy)	Commander-in-Chief of the Soviet Navy; 1946–1947	Succeeded by Ivan Yumashev
Preceded by Ivan Yumashev	Minister of the Soviet Navy; 1951–1953	Succeeded by Himself; Nikolai Bulganin (as Minister of Defence )
Preceded by Mikhail Frinovsky	People's Commissar of the Soviet Navy; 1939–1946	Succeeded by Office Abolished
