= Minoboron =

Minoboron may refer to:

- Ministry of Defense (Soviet Union) (Министерство обороны СССР)
- Ministry of Defence (Russia) (Минобороны России)
