= Soviet cruiser Admiral Yumashev =

Soviet Kresta II-class cruiser

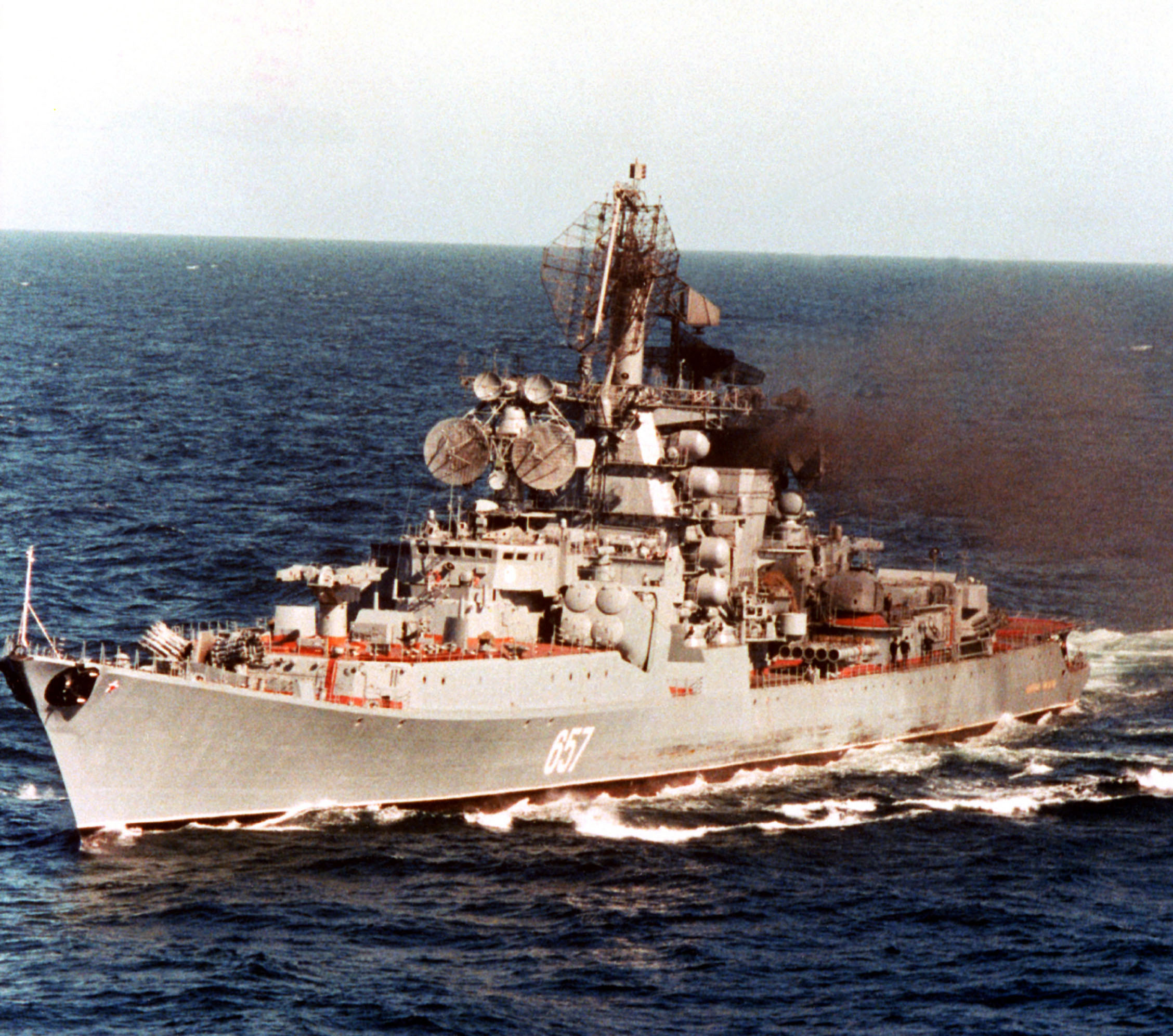
- Admiral Yumashev in 1982

History

Russia
- Name: Admiral Yumashev; (Адмирал Юмашев)
- Namesake: Ivan Yumashev
- Ordered: 15 January 1973
- Builder: Zhdanov Shipyard, Leningrad
- Yard number: 730
- Laid down: 14 April 1975
- Launched: 30 September 1976
- Commissioned: 30 December 1977
- Decommissioned: 30 July 1992
- Stricken: 31 December 1992
- Identification: See Pennant numbers
- Fate: Scrapped, 1994

General characteristics
- Class & type: Kresta II-class cruiser
- Displacement: 5,600 tonnes (5,512 long tons) standard; 7,535 tonnes (7,416 long tons) full load
- Length: 159 m (522 ft)
- Beam: 17 m (56 ft)
- Draught: 6 m (20 ft)
- Propulsion: 2 shaft steam turbines; 4 boilers; 91,000–100,000 shp (68–75 MW)
- Speed: 34 kn (63 km/h; 39 mph)
- Range: 10,500 nmi (19,400 km; 12,100 mi) at 14 kn (26 km/h; 16 mph); 5,200 nmi (9,600 km; 6,000 mi) at 18 kn (33 km/h; 21 mph)
- Endurance: 1,830 tonnes (1,801 long tons) fuel oil
- Complement: 380
- Sensors & processing systems: Don Kay; Don-2; Top Sail; Head Net; 2 x Head Lights; 2 x Muff Cob; 2 x Bass Tilt; Bull Nose sonar
- Armament: 2 × quad SS-N-14 'Silex' anti-submarine missiles; 2 × twin SA-N-3 'Goblet' surface-to-air missile launchers (72 missiles); 2 × twin 57-mm/70-cal AK-725 anti-aircraft guns; 4 × 30mm AK-630 CIWS; 2 × quintuple 533mm torpedo tubes; 2 x RBU-6000 12-barrel anti-submarine rocket launchers; 2 x RBU-1000 6-barrel anti-submarine rocket launchers
- Aircraft carried: 1 × Kamov Ka-25
- Aviation facilities: Hangar and helipad

Admiral Yumashev was a Kresta II-class cruiser of the Soviet Navy.

== Development and design ==
By the mid-1960s, the rapid growth of the threat of nuclear missile strikes from sea areas began to require an early quantitative and qualitative increase in the power of the anti-submarine defense forces of the USSR Navy to eliminate this threat. The fleet began to focus on creating a far zone of anti-submarine defense by building anti-submarine ships capable of finding and destroying nuclear submarines with ballistic missiles in the ocean of a potential enemy, the United States.

The Kresta II-class cruisers or also known as Project 1134A was developed in the northern PKB in 1964-1965. V. F. Anikiev was appointed chief designer, and deputy chief designer: Yu. A. Babich, M. S. Natus and V. D. Rubtsov. The main observers from the Navy on Project 1134-A were Captain 2nd Rank OT Safronov, then Captain 2nd Rank MA Yanchevsky, and since 1970 - Engineer-Captain 2nd Rank MA Kotler.

Despite the fact that the project number and its code clearly show a connection with its predecessor (Project 1134 Berkut), in terms of its combat purpose it was already a completely different ship, with significant changes not only in the composition of weapons, but also in design. The main dimensions of the ship according to the project have changed slightly. The width remained the same, the length increased slightly, which was due to the limited size of the building places of the closed slipway of the Leningrad plant named after A. A. Zhdanova. The designers tried to unify as much as possible the component equipment of the new and old projects (already mastered by the industry).

The tests of the ships of the series took place in a tense atmosphere typical of the Cold War. The state test program included: six to eight firings with an anti-aircraft missile system, up to 10 artillery fires with an AK-725 complex, five to six firings with anti-submarine weapons. Verification of hydroacoustic stations was carried out according to the range of determining the location of the Project 613 submarine (depth 30 m, speed 6 knots). Detection ranges of air and surface targets with all radars in service were tested on the Il-28 aircraft at an altitude of 11,000 m and patrol ships of Project 1135. State tests usually did not exceed three months, but during this period the ships passed at least 6,000 nautical miles. The displacement and stability of the ships of the project were determined by the results of the inclining of the lead ship. The test results showed quite satisfactory seaworthiness of the ships of Project 1134A.

== Construction and career ==
The ship was built at Sevmash in Severodvinsk and was launched on 30 September 1976 and commissioned on 26 September 1977.

The first commander of the ship is Captain 3rd Rank Yu. P. Gutsenko.

She entered service on 30 December 1977 and on 17 February 1978, she was enlisted in the Northern Fleet in the 170th brigade of anti-submarine ships of the 7th operational squadron.

In the winter of 1978-1979, the ship represented the interests of the USSR and monitored the movements of a potential enemy in the Mediterranean Sea, together with the Smyshlyonyi participated in escorting the Kiev aircraft carrier. In connection with the attack of the PRC on Vietnam, the ship was for a long time at the entrance to the Suez Canal for a possible transition to the conflict area. When on 5 March, the PRC leadership announced the withdrawal of its troops and the conflict was settled, the ship continued to carry out combat service. From September to October 1979, she supported the interests of the USSR in the area of NATO OVMS exercises (Ocean Hunt '79). In the same year, he took part in the only operational-tactical exercise in the history of the Soviet Navy with the real use of forces and means - the AUG Encounter Battle, between the TAVKR Kiev and Minsk.

From February 22 to February 27, 1982, she made a goodwill call at the port of Bizerte (Tunisia). In order to prevent possible provocations, by order of the General Staff of the Navy, the ship did not provide assistance to an Italian fishing schooner in distress with four fishermen on board. As a result, the ship was shown on Italian television with very unflattering comments about Soviet naval solidarity. In 1983, the ship was awarded a commemorative sign of the Murmansk regional executive committee - The best surface ship of the Northern Fleet, and the crew was presented with a commemorative banner of the Murmansk regional committee of the Communist Party of the Soviet Union, the regional executive committee and the council of people's deputies

From February 25 to March 20, 1984, she monitored the ships of a potential enemy during the NATO exercises Team Spirit '84.

In the period from 3 May to 30 December 1984, the ship was on a long voyage in the region of southwestern Africa (visits to Luanda in Angola, Pointe Noire in Congo, Praia and Mindelo on the Cape Verde Islands, Cotonou in Benin, Sao Tome and Principe).

On 13 July 1992, she was disarmed and decommissioned from the navy in connection with the transfer to the department of stock property (OFI) for dismantling and sale.

The descent of the naval flag took place on 23 February 1992.

On 31 December 1992, her crew was disbanded.

In 1994, she was sold to a private Indian company for scrap.

=== Pennant numbers ===
Date	Pennant number
	730
1977	597
	582
1978	219
1978	631
1978	657
1979	607
1980	647
1981	657
1984	688
1987	682
1990	627

== See also ==
- Cruiser
- Kresta II-class cruiser
- List of ships of the Soviet Navy
- List of ships of Russia by project number
