= Ivan Yumashev =

Soviet admiral (1895–1972)

- Иван Юмашев
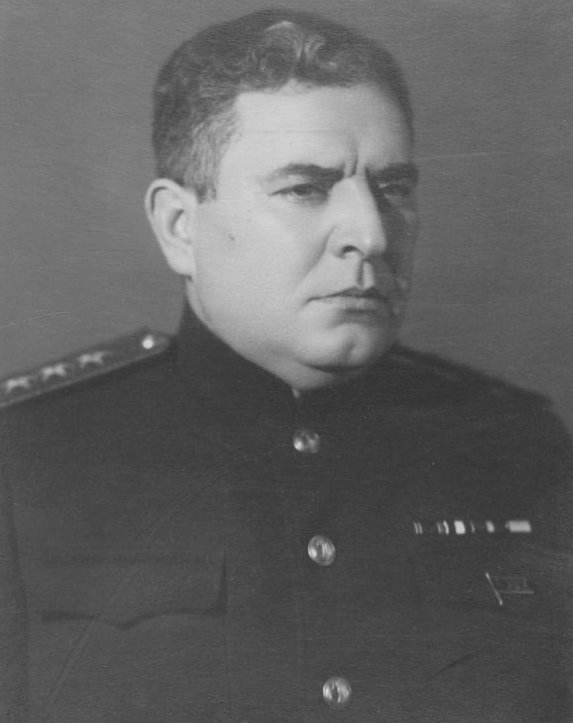
- Yumashev in 1944

Director of the Kuznetsov Naval Academy
- In office 1951–1957
- President: Nikolai Shvernik; Kliment Voroshilov
- Prime Minister: Joseph Stalin; Georgy Malenkov; Nikolai Bulganin
- General Secretary: Joseph Stalin; Georgy Malenkov; Nikita Khrushchev
- Preceded by: Yuri Panteleyev
- Succeeded by: Vladimir Andreyev

Minister of the Navy
- In office 25 February 1950 – 20 July 1951
- President: Nikolai Shvernik
- Prime Minister: Joseph Stalin
- General Secretary: Joseph Stalin
- Preceded by: Himself
- Succeeded by: Nikolai Kuznetsov

Commander-in-Chief of the Navy
- In office 17 January 1947 – 25 February 1950
- President: Nikolai Shvernik
- Prime Minister: Joseph Stalin
- General Secretary: Joseph Stalin
- Preceded by: Nikolai Kuznetsov
- Succeeded by: Himself

Personal details
- Born: 9 October 1895 Tiflis, Russian Empire
- Died: 2 September 1972 (aged 76) Leningrad, Russian SFSR, Soviet Union
- Resting place: Serafimovskoe Cemetery
- Party: Communist Party of the Soviet Union (1918–1957)

Military service
- Allegiance: Russian Empire (1912–1917); Russian SFSR (1919–1922); Soviet Union (1922–1957)
- Branch/service: Imperial Russian Navy; Soviet Navy
- Years of service: 1912–1917; 1919–1957
- Rank: Non-commissioned officer (Russian Empire); Admiral (Soviet Union)
- Commands: Pacific Fleet (1939–1947); Black Sea Fleet (1938–1939); Cruiser Krasny Krym (1932–1934); Destroyer Dzerzhinsky (1927–1931)
- Battles/wars: World War I; Russian Civil War; World War II; Soviet–Japanese War; Soviet invasion of Manchuria; Seishin Operation

Ivan Stepanovich Yumashev (Russian: Иван Степанович Юмашев; 9 October [O.S. 27 September] 1895 – 2 September 1972) was a Soviet Navy Admiral, Hero of the Soviet Union (14 September 1945), and Commander-in-Chief of the Soviet Navy from January 1947 to February 1950 and Minister of the Soviet Navy from February 1950 to July 1951.

== Early years and career ==
Yumashev was the son of a clerk. In 1910, he was expelled from the fifth grade of school, due to his family being unable to afford school fees. At the age of 15, he began to work as a shoemaker, worker at a cement factory and delivery man in the administration of the Transcaucasian Railways. After the death of his father, he moved with his mother to the village of Kapustin Yar in Astrakhan Oblast, where he began to work as a clerk of a volost government.

In September 1912, he entered the Boatswain and Apprentices School in Kronstadt. Yumashev joined the Baltic Fleet, where he was assigned to the cruiser Bogatyr. He served as a fireman and machinist, before being promoted to a non-commissioned officer. Immediately after the February Revolution, he was elected chairman of the Sailors' Committee of the Coastal artillery in Reval. In September 1917, he was dismissed from the Navy due to illness and returned to Krasny Yar. After the October Revolution, he became chairman of the local Committee of the Poor Peasants and chairman of a Selsoviet. In August 1918, he joined the Russian Communist Party, and became the commander of the Red Volunteer detachment.

In February 1919, he voluntarily joined the Red Army Naval Forces and participated in the Russian Civil War on the ships of the Astrakhan-Caspian and Volga-Caspian military flotillas. Serving as a gunner, senior gunner and battery commander, he fought on the Volga River and the Caspian Sea, and took part in the defense of Astrakhan.

From August 1920, Yumashev served in the Baltic Fleet. From 1920 to 1921, he was the commander of an artillery unit on the battleship Marat, before serving as assistant commander of the ship. During the Kronstadt rebellion in March 1921, he was arrested by the rebels and was in prison until the end of the storming of the fortress by the Red Army.

In 1924 he took part in the first long-distance cruise of the Soviet fleet, which involved the passage of the Vorovskiy messenger ship from Arkhangelsk to Vladivostok. In 1925, he educated at special courses for commanding officers of the fleet. Yumashev served on the destroyers Lenin and Voikov, which was assigned to the Baltic Fleet. He served as second assistant to the commander of the battleship Marat in 1932.

In 1926 he transferred to the Black Sea Fleet as captain of the cruiser Komintern. He subsequently commanded the cruiser Profintern and destroyer flotillas. In 1932, he attended tactical courses for commanders of ships at the Naval Academy. With the introduction of personal military ranks in the USSR, by order of the People's Commissar of Defense of the USSR No. 2488 of November 28, 1935, I. S. Yumashev was awarded the military rank of flagship of the 2nd rank. In September 1937, he became chief of staff of the Black Sea Fleet and in January 1938 commander of the Black Sea Fleet.

== World War II ==
In March 1939, he became commander of the Pacific Fleet and commanded it until 1947. He made a great contribution to the development and strengthening of the fleet, by constructing naval bases, airfields and coastal defense in the Soviet Far East. On June 4, 1940, he was promoted to the rank of Vice Admiral and on May 31, 1943, he was awarded the rank of Admiral.

From August to September 1945, he led the Pacific Fleet war against Japan during Operation August Storm. Under his command, the Pacific Fleet successfully assisted the troops of the 1st and 2nd Far Eastern Fronts in defeating the Kwantung Army, participated in the liberation of South Sakhalin and the Kuril Islands. He also oversaw the Seishin Operation at the northern part of the Korean Peninsula.

For commanding the fleet in the battles with Japanese troops, on September 14, 1945, he was awarded the title of Hero of the Soviet Union and the Order of Lenin.

== Post war ==
In 1947 he was promoted to Commander in Chief of the Soviet Navy and in 1950 became Minister of the Navy, replaced one year later by Nikolai Kuznetsov. Since 1951 he was director of the Naval Academy. Yumashev retired in 1957 and died in Leningrad in 1972.

== Awards and honours ==
- Soviet Union:
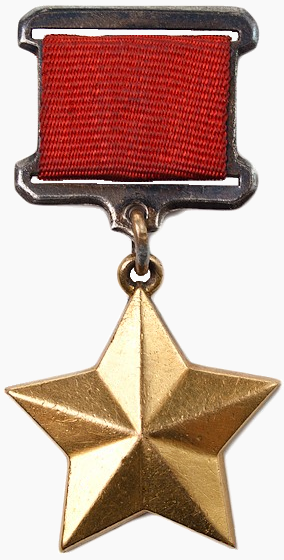
  - Hero of the Soviet Union (14 September 1945)
  - Order of Lenin, six times (31 May 1943, 21 February 1945, 10 August 1945, 14 September 1945, 8 October 1955, 9 October 1965)
  - Order of the Red Banner, three times (22 February 1938, 3 November 1944, 10 June 1949)
  - Order of the Red Star (23 December 1935)
  - Medal "For the Victory over Germany in the Great Patriotic War 1941–1945" (1945)
  - Medal "For the Victory over Japan" (1945)
  - Jubilee Medal "Twenty Years of Victory in the Great Patriotic War 1941–1945" (1965)
  - Jubilee Medal "In Commemoration of the 100th Anniversary of the Birth of Vladimir Ilyich Lenin" (1969)
  - Jubilee Medal "XX Years of the Workers' and Peasants' Red Army" (1938)
  - Jubilee Medal "30 Years of the Soviet Army and Navy" (1948)
  - Jubilee Medal "40 Years of the Armed Forces of the USSR" (1957)
  - Jubilee Medal "50 Years of the Armed Forces of the USSR" (1967)
- Other countries:
  - Medal of Sino-Soviet Friendship (China)
  - Order of the National Flag, 1st class (North Korea)
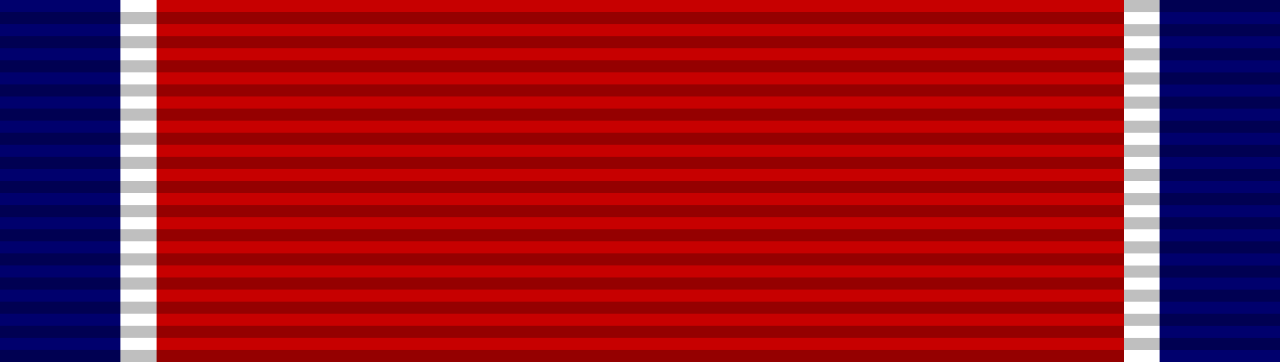
  - Medal for the Liberation of Korea (North Korea)
  - Order of Polonia Restituta (Poland)

Streets in the cities of Vladivostok, Sevastopol and Yekaterinburg are named after Yumashev. A Cruiser in the Soviet Navy (Kresta II-class cruiser) and a frigate in the Russian Navy (Admiral Gorshkov-class frigates) are also named after Yumashev.

Military offices
Preceded by Yuri Panteleyev	Kuznetsov Naval Academy; 1951–1957	Succeeded by Vladimir Andreyev
Preceded by Himself	Minister of the Navy; 1950–1951	Succeeded by Nikolai Kuznetsov
Preceded by Nikolai Kuznetsov	Commander-in-Chief of the Soviet Navy; 1947–1951	Succeeded by Himself
