= Military Affairs (magazine) =

Soviet military magazine

- The journal is military-scientific, an organ in the part of the general staff
- Editor: Editorial team
- Categories: Military journal
- Frequency: Weekly
- Publisher: Literary and Publishing Department of the Political Administration of the Revolutionary Military Council
- Founder: People's Commissariat for Military and Naval Affairs
- First issue: June 1, 1918
- Final issue: March 1920
- Country: Soviet Russia
- Based in: Moscow
- Language: Russian

"Military Affairs" was a popular Russian-language military (military-scientific) magazine on military affairs, the press organ of the People's Commissariat for Military and Naval Affairs on the part of the General Staff. It was published once a week. Until 1920, it was the only periodical in Russia designed for a wide range of readers and was intended for the command and political composition of the Workers' and Peasants' Red Army.

The main objectives of the magazine: to clarify the policies and activities of the Russian Communist Party (Bolsheviks) and the Soviet government on the military construction of the Workers' and Peasants' Red Army, methods of training and education of personnel, coverage of the theory and practice of the use of troops of the Workers' and Peasants' Red Army, the use of military affairs for abroad.

Motto: "Knowledge and Skill – Strength".

Editorial office: Moscow.

Subscription price in 1919:

- 1 month – 12 rubles;
- 3 months – 35 rubles;
- 1/2 year – 65 rubles.

The price of a separate issue of the magazine was 3 rubles.

== History of the magazine ==
It was founded in June 1918, and the first issue was released on June 1, 1918.

Published under this name until March 1920.

- From March 1920 – 1921 – "Military Scientific Journal of the Workers' and Peasants' Red Army";
- 1921 – 1922 – "Military Science and Revolution";
- 1922 – 1925 – "Military Thought and Revolution";
- 1925 – 1936 – "War and Revolution";
- 1936 – "Military Thought" (the predecessor of "Military Thought" is considered to be the Military Collection journal founded in 1858 on the initiative of Professor of the Imperial Military Academy Dmitry Milyutin. The current Military Thought is the main military-theoretical publication of the Ministry of Defense of the Russian Federation – is the direct successor of the publication "Military Affairs", the first issue of which was published on June 1, 1918 (since 1936 – "Military Thought")).

"...Shaposhnikov, who during the Soviet–Polish War in the magazine "Military Affairs" published an unusually rude chauvinistic article in the spirit of the good tsarist era ("Insidious Poles", etc.)..."

— Leon Trotsky

== Content ==
- Articles;
- Printed works of Boris Shaposhnikov in the journal:
  - A Month Behind Enemy Lines. Magazine "Military Affairs", Moscow, 1918, No. 27;
  - Mirage And Reality. "Military Affairs", 1919, No. 2;
  - Cavalry Raids. "Military Affairs", 1919, No. 28–29;
  - Horse Masses. "Military Affairs", 1919, No. 34–35;
  - The Review of Military Operations of the Red Army (From November 7 to December 1). "Military Affairs", 1919, No. 34–35;
  - Review of the Fighting of the Red Army for December 1919. "Military Affairs", 1920, No. 1;
  - Review of the Fighting of the Red Army in January 1920, "Military Affairs", 1920, No. 2;
  - Review of the Fighting of the Red Army in February 1920, "Military Affairs", 1920, No. 4;
  - The Review of Military Operations of the Red Army in March 1920. "Military Affairs", 1920, No. 9;
  - Police Cavalry. "Military Affairs", 1920, No. 10;
  - The Review of Military Operations of the Red Army in April 1920. "Military Affairs", 1920, No. 11;
  - Police Cavalry. "Military Affairs", 1920, No. 12;
  - The First Combat Steps of Marshal Pilsudski. "Military Affairs", 1920, No. 13;
  - Review of the Fighting of the Red Army in May 1920, "Military Affairs", 1920, No. 13;
  - Polish Army. "Military Affairs", 1920, No. 15.
- Black and white photographs.

== Sources ==
- Release Date of the First Issue
