= People's Commissariat of the Navy of the Soviet Union =

- Народный комиссариат Военно-морского флота СССР
- All ministry seals of the Soviet Union used the USSR coat of arms

- Flag of the People's Commissariat of the Navy

Agency overview
- Formed: December 30, 1937
- Preceding agency: People's Commissariat for Military and Naval Affairs
- Dissolved: February 25, 1946
- Superseding agency: People's Commissariat of Defense of the Soviet Union
- Jurisdiction: Soviet Union
- Headquarters: Moscow
- Parent department: Council of People's Commissars of the Soviet Union

The People's Commissariat of the Navy of the Soviet Union (Russian: Народный комиссариат Военно-морского флота СССР) was the central governing body that exercised leadership of the Soviet Navy from December 30, 1937, to February 25, 1946. The People's Commissariat was formed from the Navy Directorate of the Red Army, which was part of the People's Commissariat of Defense of the Soviet Union.

The People's Commissariat was responsible for developing plans for the construction, armament and manning of the Navy, developing combat equipment, weapons and coastal construction, monitoring the fulfillment of orders for the Navy; managing the operational use of the Navy, its operational, combat, political and mobilization training and organization of air defense, training personnel for the fleet.

The People's Commissariat was abolished in connection with the formation of the People's Commissariat of the Soviet Armed Forces.

== History ==
In connection with the development of the fleet and the change in the nature of its tasks, the organization of the management of fleets and flotillas changed. Since 1918, the People's Commissariat for Naval Affairs existed, and the supreme command of the fleet and army was exercised by the Revolutionary Military Council. In 1924, the People's Commissariat for Military and Naval Affairs became the central body of the Soviet Armed Forces. In 1926, the Red Army Navy Directorate was created to manage the fleet and flotillas, and the Main Naval Staff was formed.

In order to further develop the Soviet Navy, the Central Committee of the Communist Party of the Soviet Union and the Soviet government recognized the need to create an independent all-Union People's Commissariat of the Soviet Navy. The resolution on its establishment was adopted by the Central Executive Committee and the Council of People's Commissars of the Soviet Union on December 30, 1937. The first People's Commissar of the Navy was Army Commissar 1st Rank Pyotr Smirnov.

On March 13, 1938, by the Resolution of the Central Committee of the Communist Party of the Soviet Union and the Council of People's Commissars of the Soviet Union, the Main Military Council of the Workers' and Peasants' Red Army was established under the People's Commissariat of Defense, and on April 23, 1938, the Main Military Council of the Navy was established under the People's Commissariat of the Navy, consisting of P. A. Smirnov (chairman), Lev Galler, Andrei Zhdanov, Ivan Isakov, Nikolai Kuznetsov, Gordey Levchenko and others. In the districts, fleets and armies, Military Councils were established on May 10, 1937.

The Military Councils of the fleets, commanders and military commissars of the flotillas, naval educational and research institutions were subordinate to the People's Commissar of the Navy (in addition to the central administrations).

Initially, the central bodies of the People's Commissariat of the Navy of the Soviet Union included the Main Naval Staff; directorates: political (from June 1940, the Main Directorate of Political Propaganda of the Navy, from July 1941, the Main Political Directorate of the Navy), naval aviation (from February 25, 1941, the Naval Air Force Directorate), EPRON, shipbuilding, armament and ammunition supply, technical, hydrographic, supply, engineering, construction, naval educational institutions, command; independent departments: intelligence, communications, sanitary and financial; naval inspection, control and inspection group, general department. In 1939–1940, the following were created: the Main Directorate of Ports (from May 25, 1942, the Main Directorate of the Rear Services of the Navy) and other new directorates (combat training, reconnaissance, mine and torpedo, artillery, chemical, air defense, submarine navigation, communications, quarters and operations, sanitary, affairs) and departments, a scientific and technical committee, the Secretariat of the People's Commissar of the Navy, a permanent acceptance committee for ships, and a naval publishing house.

During the Great Patriotic War, the People's Commissariat of the Navy of the Soviet Union exercised control over the construction and combat operations of the Navy. From 31 March 1944, after the fleets were withdrawn from the operational subordination of the commanders of the coastal fronts, the People's Commissar of the Navy began to exercise the functions of the Commander-in-Chief of the Navy and was responsible at the Stavka of the Supreme High Command for organizing operational and strategic interaction between the fronts and fleets. On June 22, 1941, the Navy Emergency Rescue Department was created, and on July 16, 1943, the Radar Department and other central bodies were created.

== People's Commissars of the Navy ==
No.	Portrait	Commissar	Took office	Left office
1	Pyotr Smirnov	Pyotr Smirnov (1897–1939)	30 December 1937	30 June 1938
2	Pyotr Smirnov-Svetlovski [ru]	Pyotr Smirnov-Svetlovski (1897–1940)	30 June 1938	8 September 1938
3	Mikhail Frinovsky	Mikhail Frinovsky (1898–1940)	8 September 1938	6 April 1939
4	Nikolai Kuznetsov	Nikolai Kuznetsov	28 April 1939	25 February 1946

== See also ==
- United States Department of the Navy
