= Ministry of Defense (Soviet Union) =

Government ministry of the Soviet Union

Ministry of Defence of the Soviet Union
- Министерство обороны СССР
- Standard of the Minister of Defence (1964–1991)

Agency overview
- Formed: 1919
- Preceding agency: People's Commissariat of Defense of the Soviet Union (1934–1946)
- Dissolved: 16 March 1992
- Jurisdiction: Council of Ministers of the Soviet Union
- Headquarters: Khamovniki District, Moscow, RSFSR
- Minister responsible: Kliment Voroshilov, Minister of Defence (longest serving)
- Parent department: Council of Ministers of the Soviet Union; Central Committee of the Communist Party of the Soviet Union; Council of Defence; Stavka of the Supreme High Command

The Ministry of Defense (Minoboron; Russian: Министерство обороны СССР) was a government ministry in the Soviet Union, which supervised the Soviet Armed Forces. The first Minister of Defense was Nikolai Bulganin, starting in 1953.

== History ==
The Ministry of Defence has been renamed several times.

From 1923 to 1934, it was known as the People's Commissariat for Military and Naval Affairs, which was grandfathered from the People's Commissariat for Military and Naval Affairs of the Russian SFSR. Starting from 1934 to 1946, it was named the People's Commissariat of Defense of the Soviet Union, while in 1937 the People's Commissariat of the Navy split from it. The first people's commissars of the separate naval institution were NKVD officials rather than naval officers. The first career naval officer to be appointed to the naval institution was Nikolay Kuznetsov on 28 April 1939. On February 25, 1946, under Stalin, the People's Commissariat of Defense of the Soviet Union and the People's Commissariat of the Navy of the Soviet Union were amalgamated into a Ministry of the Armed Forces of the Soviet Union (Russian: Министерство Вооружённых Сил СССР). The ministry became responsible for:

"developing long-term plans for the development of the army and navy and improving organization and logistics [of] all types and branches of troops of the Armed Forces, which were controlled through the corresponding main commands in accordance with the specific responsibilities assigned to them." [..According to the “Regulations on the Ministry of the Armed Forces of the USSR”, approved by the Council of Ministers of the USSR on June 3, 1946.]

In 1950, the ministry was again separated with the War Ministry (Russian: Военное министерство СССР) and Navy Ministry (Russian: Военно-морское министерство СССР) recreated, responsible to the Council of Ministers, "which had the Supreme Military Soviet as its highest organ," responsible for directing the Armed Forces. In 1953, the two were unified again as the Ministry of Defence.

=== Disbandment ===
The Ministry of Defense of the Russian Federation was established on 16 March 1992. An agreement to set up a joint Commonwealth of Independent States military command was signed on 20 March 1992, but the idea was discarded as Russia created its own defence ministry and the other former Soviet republics decided to establish up separate national armed forces.

== Organization ==
The Ministry of Defence, an all-union ministry, was technically subordinate to the Council of Ministers, as well as to the Supreme Soviet and the Central Committee of the Communist Party of the Soviet Union. In 1989 it was, however, larger than most other ministries and had special arrangements for party supervision of, and state participation in, its activities. The Ministry of Defence was made up of the General Staff, the Main Political Directorate of the Soviet Army and Soviet Navy, the Warsaw Pact, the five armed services, and the main and central directorates. The General Staff was created by Stalin in 1935, as the development of more complex military forces required leaders with greater training and specialization. It acted as the main organ of control for all Soviet military forces during World War II. The five armed services were the navy, the ground forces, the military air forces, the air defense forces and the rocket forces. Higher level subunits in the Ministry would have an associated military collegium, essentially a council responsible for dealing with various issues, all under the ultimate command of the Central Committee of the Communist Party. Both the Ministry of Defence and the General Staff were predominantly led by the Ground Forces.

=== Ministry structure ===
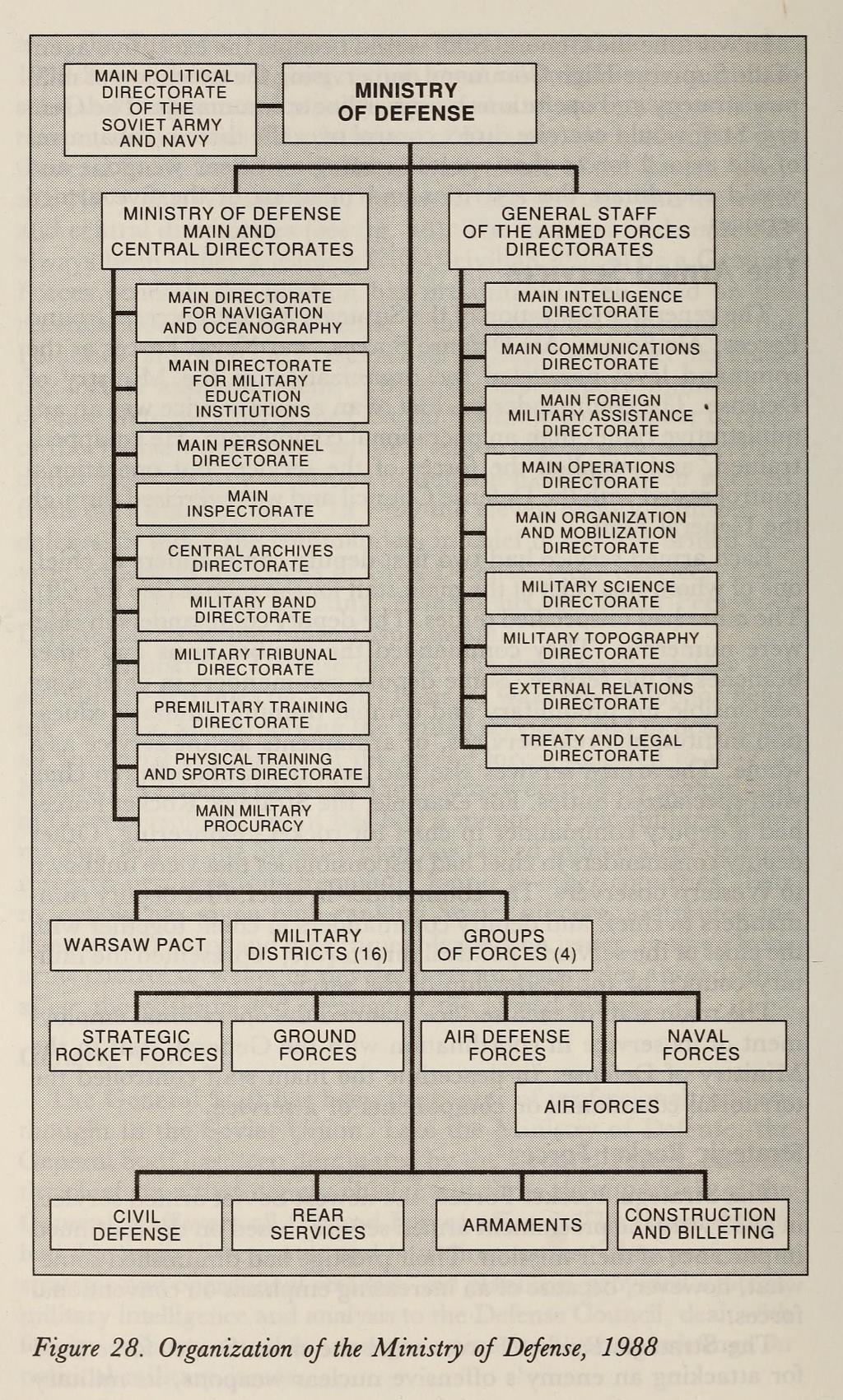
Organisation of the Ministry of Defence of the Soviet Union, 1988

=== Leadership ===
==== Minister of Defence ====
The minister of defence was always either a leading Communist Party civilian official or a Ground Forces general; the position was presumably filled on the recommendation of the Defence Council with the approval of the Politburo, although the Presidium of the Supreme Soviet made the formal announcement. After Minister of Defence General Georgy Zhukov was removed from his position in the Politburo in 1957, the Minister of Defense would not be made a part of Politburo again until 1973. In the 1980s, the Minister of Defense would only maintain alternate membership in the Politburo.

==== Deputy ministers ====
The three first deputy ministers of defense were the chief of the General Staff, the commander in chief of the Warsaw Pact, and another senior officer with unspecified duties. First deputy ministers of defense have also been selected from the Ground Forces. In 1989 the eleven deputy ministers of defense included the commanders in chief of the five armed services as well as the chiefs of Civil Defense, Rear Services, Construction and Troop Billeting, Armaments, the Main Personnel Directorate, and the Main Inspectorate.

=== Departments and directorates of the Ministry ===
- Main Political Directorate of the Soviet Army and Soviet Navy, a ministerial directorate and a department of the Central Committee of the Communist Party of the Soviet Union
- General Staff of the Armed Forces of the Soviet Union
- Main and Central Directorates
- Warsaw Pact (Supreme Commander of the Unified Armed Forces of the Warsaw Treaty Organization)
- Military districts of the Soviet Union
- Groups of Forces: Group of Soviet Forces in Germany, Northern Group of Armed Forces (Poland), Central Group of Forces, Southern Group of Forces
- Branches of the Armed Forces and supporting agencies: Strategic Rocket Forces, Ground Forces, Air Defence Forces, Air Forces, Naval Forces, Civil Defense, Rear Services, Construction and Troop Billeting, Armaments

==== Press ====
- Krasnaya Zvezda (Red Star) was the "central organ" – official newspaper of the Ministry.

== Responsibilities ==
The Ministry of Defence directed the five armed services and all military activities on a daily basis. It was responsible for fielding, arming, and supplying the armed services, and in peacetime all territorial commands of the armed forces reported to it. The design, equipment and staffing of the military services, as well as the development of their individual doctrines was the responsibility of various deputies ministers, overseen by the General Staff. The Ministry of Defense has been staffed almost entirely by professional military personnel, and it has had a monopoly on military information because the Soviet Union has lacked independent defense research organizations frequently found in other countries. This monopoly has given high-ranking Soviet officers undisputed influence with party and government leaders on issues, ranging from arms control to weapons development to arms sales abroad, that affect the position and prestige of the armed forces. The Ministry of Defense was capable of calling on various Soviet academies and institutes for analysis and studies on military matters, as well as the each service's own academies capable of running field tests. Virtually all of this analysis, studies, and testing was classified secret, and non-military actors had no access to it.

The General Staff was responsible for overseeing war plans, training, mobilization and combat readiness of forces. During times of war, the General Staff would act as the executive arm of the Supreme High Command, exercising direct control over the five military forces. The top leadership of the Ministry of Defense (the Minister of Defence, the three first deputy ministers of defense, the eleven ministers of defence and the chief of the Main Political Directorate of the Soviet Army and Navy) formed the Main Military Council. At this time, the Main Military Council would become the headquarters of the Supreme High Command. The Main Military Council would also resolve conflicts between the five services and present the Defense Council with the budgetary requirements of the military determined by the General Staff.

== See also ==
- Minister of Defence (Soviet Union)
- Ministry of Defense Industry (Soviet Union)
- List of heads of the military of post-imperial Russia
