= Pyotr Smirnov =

Soviet commissar, deputy minister of defence, and commander of the Soviet Navy

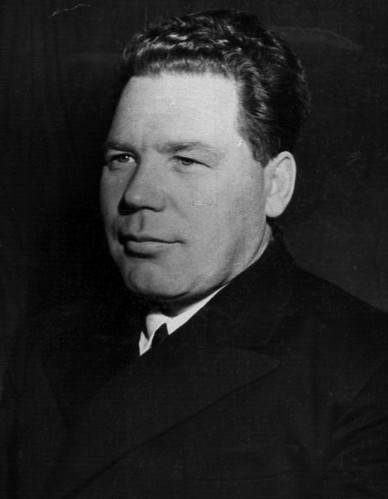
- Smirnov in 1938

People’s Commissar for the Navy
- In office 30 December 1937 – 30 June 1938
- Preceded by: Mikhail Viktorov
- Succeeded by: Mikhail Frinovsky

Personal details
- Born: 29 May 1897 Vyatka, Russian Empire
- Died: 23 February 1939 (aged 41) Moscow, Soviet Union
- Party: All-Union Communist Party (Bolsheviks) (1917–1938)
- Awards: Order of Lenin; Order of the Red Banner

Military service
- Allegiance: Russian Soviet Federative Socialist Republic (1918–1922); Soviet Union (1922–1938)
- Branch/service: Red Guards; Red Army; Soviet Navy
- Years of service: 1918–1938
- Rank: Army Commissar of 1st rank
- Battles/wars: Russian Civil War

Pyotr Alexandrovich Smirnov (Russian: Пётр Александрович Смирнов; 29 May 1897 – 23 February 1939) was a Soviet politician who served as People's Commissar of the Navy of the Soviet Union .

== Biography ==
Smirnov was born in a workers family in a village near Vyatka in 1897. He finished school and worked as a smith in a timber mill from 1913. He joined the Bolsheviks in March 1917 and was a member of the Red Guards. He fought in the Civil War ending as a brigade commander and a political officer of an army. In 1921 he took part in the suppression of the Kronstadt rebellion.

In the 1920s he was a political commissar of the Volga and North Caucasus military districts. From 1926 he joined the political directorate of the armed forces and was political commissar of the Baltic Fleet and Military districts.

In 1937 he was involved in the purge of military leaders including Yakov Gamarnik. In October 1937 he became deputy minister of defence, and was People's Commissar of the Navy from December 1937.

== Repression ==
He was arrested in June 1938 and executed by firing squad in February 1939. He was rehabilitated in 1956.

== Awards ==
- The order of Lenin;
- Order of the Red Banner (1921).

Military offices
Preceded by Mikhail Viktorov	Commander-in-Chief of the Soviet Navy; 1937–1938	Succeeded by Mikhail Frinovsky
Preceded by None	People's Commissars for the Navy; 1937–1938	Succeeded by Mikhail Frinovsky
