= People's Commissariat of Defense of the Soviet Union =

Highest military department of USSR (1934–1946)

- Народный комиссариат обороны Советского Союза

Agency overview
- Formed: June 20, 1934
- Preceding agency: People's Commissariat for Military and Naval Affairs
- Dissolved: February 25, 1946
- Superseding agency: People's Commissariat of the Armed Forces of the Soviet Union
- Jurisdiction: Soviet Union
- Headquarters: Moscow
- Agency executives: Clement Voroshilov; Semyon Tymoshenko; Joseph Stalin
- Parent department: Council of People's Commissars of the Soviet Union

The People's Commissariat of Defense of the Soviet Union (Russian: Народный комиссариат обороны Советского Союза, romanized: Narodnyy komissariat oborony Sovetskovo Soyuza) was the highest military department of the Soviet Union from 1934 to 1946.

== History ==
In the 1920–1930s, the highest military authority of the Russian Socialist Federative Soviet Republic/Soviet Union was called the People's Commissariat for Military and Naval Affairs.

On June 20, 1934, the People's Commissariat for Military and Naval Affairs was transformed into the People's Commissariat of Defense of the Soviet Union. On December 30, 1937, the People's Commissariat of the Navy of the Soviet Union was detached from it.

On February 1, 1944, in connection with the adoption of the Law of the Soviet Union on the creation of military formations of the Union republics, the People's Commissariat of Defence of the Soviet Union was transformed from the All–Union People's Commissariat into the Union–Republican. The Russian Soviet Federative Socialist Republic has created its own People's Commissariat of Defence.

On February 25, 1946, by decree of the Presidium of the Supreme Soviet of the Soviet Union, the People's Commissariat of Defence of the Soviet Union merged with the People's Commissariat of the Navy of the Soviet Union into a single Union–Republican People's Commissariat of the Armed Forces of the Soviet Union. Under this name, the central authority was designated in documents for less than a month, since in accordance with the Law of the Soviet Union of March 15, 1946 on the transformation of the Councils of People's Commissars of the Soviet Union and Union Republics into Councils of Ministers, it was renamed the Ministry of Armed Forces of the Soviet Union. On February 25, 1947, in accordance with the aforementioned decisions, amendments were made to the Constitution of the Soviet Union.

The printing organ of the People's Commissariat for Military and Naval Affairs in the part of the General Staff was the Military Affairs magazine.

The central organ of the People's Commissariat of Defence of the Soviet Union to educate the commanding and rank-and-file staff of the Red Army, to promote combat training tasks and to develop advanced military thought was the Krasnaya Zvezda newspaper.

Draft regulations on the People's Commissariat of Defence of the Soviet Union

Regulation on the People's Commissariat of Defence of the Soviet Union [See note 1 to the text]

Section 1

Chapter I. People's Commissariat of Defence of the Soviet Union

1. The People's Commissariat of Defence of the Soviet Union, in accordance with Article 77 of the Constitution of the Union of Soviet Socialist Republics, is the All-Union People's Commissariat of the Union of Soviet Socialist Republics.
2. The People's Defense Commissariat of the Soviet Union is concentrating on the leadership of the combat, mobilization and political training of the ground and air forces of the Red Army and their operational use in wartime.
The People's Commissariat of Defence is entrusted with:
– development and submission for approval by the Government of the Soviet Union of plans for organizing and arming the Red Army;
– development of plans for the defence of the country and the operational use of ground and air forces and means and the organization of the rear and material support of the Red Army;
– the organization of ground and air forces of the Red Army, in accordance with the instructions of the Government;
– combat training of troops;
– political education of the personnel of the Red Army;
– leadership in the implementation of measures to train personnel of the Red Army, both personnel and stock, rank-and-file and commanding personnel;
– setting goals and monitoring the conduct of military training of citizens in the institutions of the Society for the Promotion of Defence, Aviation and Chemical Construction, the Russian Red Cross Society, civilian people's commissariats and other central institutions of the Soviet Union;
– fulfillment of the Government’s tasks on organizing the air defence of the Soviet Union, inspecting the preparations for the local air defense of air defence points and objects, and checking the state of combat readiness of these points and objects, regardless of their departmental affiliation;
– military zoning of the Red Army;
– deployment and movement of troops;
– carrying out, on the basis of the Law, calls of citizens of the Soviet Union for serving active military service and training camps;
– scheduling diseases and physical disabilities, according to which the drafted is exempted from active military service;
– manning the army with horseback;
– development and improvement of all weapons and military equipment;
– conducting experimental mobilization;
– armament of the Red Army with all types of military equipment;
– supplying the army with all types of allowances;
– implementation of the defensive construction of the Red Army;
– management of the sanitary and veterinary services of the Red Army;
– training and accounting personnel of the command and rank and file;
– leadership, on the basis of the Law, of the initial and pre-conscription training of students;
– providing pensions and benefits to personnel of the Red Army;
– accounting for military stock;
– accounting of all types of transport, horse and harness to be trained by the Red Army for mobilization;
– verification of the mobilization readiness of industry, the central institutions of the Soviet Union and public organizations;
– the production of military geodesic, military topographic and military aerial photographs throughout the Soviet Union;
– the establishment, on the basis of the Law, of a regime for citizens living in areas of fortified areas, military depots, training grounds and military airfields;
– development of military legislation;
– organization of enterprises operating on the basis of economic calculation and approval of their charters.
3. The People's Commissariat of Defense of the Soviet Union publishes:
a) the orders of the People's Commissar for the Army for leadership of the Red Army;
b) the orders of the People's Commissar of Defense to manage the activities of the People’s Commissariat of Defense;
c) the orders of the People's Commissar for the army;
d) combat regulations of the Red Army, regulations, instructions and instructions on the combat and operational use of the armed forces of the Soviet Union, device and service of troops;
e) the rules for the registration of military personnel and those liable for military service and the rules on the procedure for granting them deferrals and benefits on conscription;
f) orders related to compulsory military service;
g) the rules for keeping records of vehicles, horses and harnesses belonging to departments and the population, which are to be supplied by the Red Army for mobilization.

Chapter II. People's Commissar of Defence of the Soviet Union

4. At the head of the People's Commissariat of Defence of the Soviet Union is the People's Commissar of Defense of the Soviet Union, who is also the Commander-in-Chief of all ground and air forces of the Soviet Union.
5. The People's Commissar of Defence is appointed and dismissed by the Supreme Council of the Soviet Union.
6. The People's Commissar of Defence is a member of the Committee of Defence under the Council of People's Commissars of the Soviet Union.
7. The People's Commissar of Defence is responsible for the state of combat, political and mobilization readiness of the ground and air forces of the Red Army.
8. The People's Commissar of Defence enter representations in the Government on cases to be resolved in the highest bodies of state power and bodies of state administration.
9. People's Commissar of Defence of the Soviet Soviet Union:
a) appoints and dismisses the commanding staff of the Red Army, and also enters, as appropriate, with representations to the Government on these issues;
b) assigns military ranks to commanders, up to and including the colonel;
c) represent the commanding staff for the appropriation of general ranks;
d) represents the personnel of the army for awarding orders and medals.
10. The People's Commissar of Defence is the manager of loans of the People's Commissariat of Defence, according to the Law.
11. In extraordinary circumstances, the People’s Commissar of Defence resolves issues subject to the supreme authority, if the resolution of these issues cannot be postponed without prejudice to state interests.

Chapter III. Deputies People's Commissar of Defence

12. Deputies of the People's Commissar of Defence are appointed and dismissed by the Council of People's Commissars of the Soviet Union and report directly to the People's Commissar of Defence of the Soviet Union.
13. One of the deputies of the People's Commissar of Defence is the first deputy and replaces the People's Commissar in his absence.
14. Deputies of the People's Commissar of Defence are the closest and immediate assistants to the People's Commissar of Defence. The circle of their activities is determined by the people's commissar.
15. In the absence of the People's Commissar of Defense and his first deputy, the People's Commissar replaces one of the remaining deputies, as directed by the People's Commissar.

Section 2. The Main Military Council of the Red Army

16. To consider the main issues of organization and organization, combat and mobilization training, weapons and technical equipment of the Red Army, the Main Military Council of the Red Army is formed.
17. The chairman of the Main Military Council of the Red Army is the People's Commissar of Defense of the Soviet Union.
18. The composition of the Main Military Council of the Red Army is established by the Council of People's Commissars of the Soviet Union.
19. The Main Military Council is entrusted with:
a) consideration of the main issues on the organization and arrangement of ground and air forces of the Red Army, manning and mobilization training of the army, and questions on all areas of activity of the People's Commissariat of Defense, put up for discussion by the People's Commissar of Defense;
b) consideration of new models of weapons and military equipment, as well as the weapons system of the Red Army;
c) discussion of measures to train army personnel;
d) discussion of draft laws to be submitted for approval by the Government.
20. Decisions of the Main Military Council are announced by orders of the People’s Commissariat of Defense.

Section 3. Central departments, inspections and departments of the People's Commissariat of Defense of the Soviet Union

21. The composition of the People's Commissariat of Defense of the Soviet Union includes:
1) General Staff of the Red Army;
2) The Main Directorate of Political Propaganda of the Red Army;
3) General Directorate of the Military Air Force;
4) Main Artillery Directorate;
5) Main Armored Directorate;
6) The main military engineering department;
7) The main quartermaster office;
8) Office of combat training;
9) Air Defense Administration;
10) Office of Communications;
11) Office of military chemical protection;
12) Fuel Supply Management;
13) Office of military schools;
14) Office of personnel;
15) Sanitary management;
16) Veterinary management;
17) Management of affairs under the People's Commissar of Defense;
18) The financial department under the People's Commissar of Defense;
19) Inspections at the People's Commissar of Defense:
a) Inspection of infantry;
b) Inspection of the cavalry;
c) Inspection of artillery;
d) Inspection of armored forces;
e) Air Force Inspection;
e) Inspection of engineering troops;
g) Inspection of communications;
20) Military publishing house;
21) Management of military stud farms of the Red Army;
22) The editors and publishers of the central organ of the People's Commissariat of Defense of the Soviet Union of the newspaper Krasnaya Zvezda.

Chapter I. General Staff of the Red Army

22. The General Staff of the Red Army is the central governing body of the People's Commissariat of Defense of the Soviet Union for the preparation and use of ground and air armed forces of the Soviet Union for the defense of the country.
23. The General Staff of the Red Army is entrusted with:
a) the development of plans for war and the operational use of ground and air armed forces and equipment;
b) the development of tasks for the operational preparation of theaters of operations in all respects;
c) the development of tasks for the operational preparation and use of communications in wartime;
d) collection and processing of military-statistical materials and information on theaters of operations and on the armed forces of foreign states;
e) the development of plans for the organization of the armed forces and the mobilization deployment scheme of the Red Army;
e) the development of instructions for driving army formations;
g) the development of general assumptions for the large maneuvers of the Red Army;
h) the development of measures for the military mobilization of the Red Army;
i) the organization of the rear and material support of the Red Army both in peacetime and in wartime;
j) planning military transport in peacetime and wartime;
k) the development of mobilization requests to the people's commissariats, the central institutions of the Soviet Union and industry for providing the Red Army with wartime resources;
l) the deployment of storage facilities for mobilization reserves;
m) management of the compilation of a consolidated annual plan of orders of the People’s Commissariat of Defense of the Soviet Union for all types of weapons, technical and material supplies;
n) leadership in the development of operational and tactical missions to improve weapons and technical means of combat;
o) leadership of the military topographic service in the Red Army;
p) the supply of troops with cards in peacetime and wartime;
c) the management of the conscription of the Red Army and the dismissal of those who have served in the military.
24. The General Staff of the Red Army issues:
a) the orders of the Chief of the General Staff given in pursuance of the instructions of the People's Commissar of Defense;
b) instructions, instructions and guidelines on the activities of the General Staff of the Red Army.
25. The General Staff of the Red Army consists of departments:
a) operational;
b) intelligence;
c) organizational;
d) military communications;
e) mobilization;
e) rear services and supplies;
g) staffing;
g) military topographic
departments:
a) fortified areas;
b) military-historical;
c) personnel;
d) economic.
Note: The head of the Military Communications Directorate of the General Staff is simultaneously the chief of military communications of the Red Army and the head of the railway troops, and the head of the Military Topographic Directorate is the head of the military topographic units.

Chapter II. Chief of the General Staff of the Red Army

26. The head of the General Staff of the Red Army is the chief of the General Staff.
27. The Chief of the General Staff is appointed and dismissed by the Council of People's Commissars of the Soviet Union [See note 2 to the text].
28. The Chief of the General Staff is the direct and closest executor of instructions and orders of the People's Commissar of Defense and, in accordance with these instructions, combines the activities of all the departments of the People's Commissariat of Defense.
29. The chief of the General Staff signs the orders of the army and the departments of the People's Commissariat of Defense, in accordance with the instructions of the People's Commissar of Defense.
30. The chief of the General Staff leads the development of plans for preparation for war and combines the work of the headquarters of the military districts in this regard.
31. The Chief of the General Staff of the Red Army is a member of the Defense Committee under the Council of People's Commissars of the Soviet Union, the Main Military Council of the Red Army and the Higher Attestation Commission.
32. The Chief of the General Staff monitors the development and improvement of all branches of military affairs and the dissemination of military knowledge in the Red Army.
33. The Chief of the General Staff supervises the military scientific work of the General Staff, the General Staff Academy and the Mikhail Frunze Military Academy are subordinate to him.

Chapter III. General Directorate of Military Air Forces

34. The Main Directorate of the Military Air Force is the central body of the People's Commissariat of Defense for the management of combat, political and technical training of the Red Army military air forces and for the material and technical supply of these troops.
35. The Main Directorate of the Military Air Force is entrusted with:
a) directing the combat and political training of units of the military air forces;
b) the management of military schools of the air forces;
c) development of issues of organization and development of the military air forces of the Red Army and their use during the war;
d) improvement of combat driving methods of aviation units;
e) studying, as directed by the General Staff of the Red Army, theaters of operations and the entire territory of the Soviet Union for the use of air forces during the war;
f) organization and management of the rear services of the military air forces;
g) selection and registration of the commanding personnel of the military air forces and participation in its certification;
h) accumulation and training of flight and technical personnel of the stock of military air forces, in accordance with decisions of the Government;
i) supply of military air forces with aviation and aeronautical assets;
j) management of technical operation and organization of repair of the aircraft materiel;
k) guidance on the improvement of aircraft, engines and special equipment;
l) development of a plan of orders for aircraft, engines, aircraft weapons, special property and equipment, and the placement of these orders in industry;
m) the development of plans for the supply of military air forces in time of war and the accumulation of mobilization reserves;
n) the construction of aviation depots, airfields and scientific research institutions of the air force;
o) the development of staffs, timesheets and standards for aviation weapons;
p) storage and accounting of all aviation technical equipment;
c) the development of charters, manuals, instructions and textbooks of manuals for the military air forces and supply them with parts of the Red Army;
r) monitoring, at the direction of the Government, the development and training of the civil air fleet, in accordance with its mobilization mission.
36. The Main Directorate of the Military Air Forces of the Red Army consists of:
1) The headquarters of the military air forces;
2) Management:
a) combat training;
b) operation and military repair;
c) personnel;
d) military educational institutions;
e) aerodrome service;
f) aircraft orders;
g) orders of motors;
h) orders of weapons and ammunition;
i) communications orders;
j) supplies;
k) repair.

Chapter IV. Main Artillery Directorate

37. The Main Artillery Directorate is the central body of the People's Commissariat of Defense in charge of the combat and technical training of artillery of the Red Army and supplying it with artillery weapons.
38. The Main Artillery Directorate is entrusted with:
a) combat training of ground and anti-aircraft artillery troops and aeronautical units;
b) the management of artillery military schools;
c) selection and registration of the commanding artillery personnel and participation in its certification;
d) supply of troops with artillery weapons of all kinds;
e) the development, at the direction of the General Staff, of proposals for the use of artillery formations and artillery means and for improving the methods of combat employment of artillery in the Red Army;
f) drawing up a plan of orders for artillery weapons and placing orders in industry;
g) management of the development, review and testing of new models of artillery weapons;
g) development of plans for the supply and accumulation of mobilization reserves of artillery weapons;
h) the construction of artillery warehouses and ranges;
i) storage and accounting of artillery property;
g) the development of staffs, timesheets and artillery weapons standards;
j) the development of charters, manuals, instructions and manuals on artillery and their supply to the Red Army.
39. The main artillery directorate consists of the following departments:
a) combat training of ground and anti-aircraft artillery;
b) weapons of ground artillery;
c) armament of anti-aircraft artillery;
d) small arms;
e) mortar weapons;
e) warehouses and arsenals;
g) repair;
g) artillery personnel;
h) artillery committee;
departments:
a) mechanical traction;
b) mobilization planning;
c) financial;
d) military schools.

Chapter V. The Main Armored Directorate

40. The Main Armored Directorate is the central body of the People's Commissariat of Defense for directing the combat and technical training of armored forces and for supplying them with means of armored weapons.
41. The Main Armored Directorate is entrusted with:
a) combat and technical training of armored forces;
b) the management of armored military schools;
c) selection and accounting of commanding personnel and participation in its certification;
d) the study, at the direction of the General Staff, of the theaters of operations with a view to using armored formations on them;
e) the development, at the direction of the General Staff, of proposals for the use of armored forces and for the improvement of combat driving methods of armored forces;
f) drawing up a plan of orders for armored weapons and placing these orders in industry;
g) consideration and testing of new models of combat vehicles and armored vehicles;
g) development of plans for the supply and accumulation of mobilization reserves of armored vehicles;
h) the construction of armored warehouses and landfills;
i) storage and accounting of armored property;
g) the development of the states, timesheets and standards for armored vehicles;
j) the development of charters, manuals, instructions and manuals for armored forces and their supply to the Red Army.
42. The main armored directorate consists of the following departments:
a) combat training of armored forces;
b) Armored;
c) Autotractor;
d) Operation and repair of armored and tractor fleets;
departments:
a) mobilization planning;
b) personnel;
c) financial;
d) the general and secret parts.

Chapter VI. Main Military Engineering Directorate

43. The Main Military Engineering Directorate is the central organ of the People's Commissariat of Defense for the management of combat and technical training of engineer troops and for strengthening the land borders of the Soviet Union.
44. The Main Military Engineering Directorate is entrusted with:
a) combat training of engineering troops and engineering training of all combat arms;
b) the management of engineering military educational institutions of the Red Army;
c) selection and registration of the commanding composition of the engineering troops and participation in its certification;
d) preparation, at the direction of the General Staff, of military theaters in fortification, camouflage, energy, hydraulic engineering, hydrogeological and road-building relations and the preparation of directories and descriptions of them;
e) defensive construction of fortified areas, construction of barracks and communications in fortified areas;
f) preparation of projects and estimates for defensive construction;
g) the development, at the direction of the General Staff, of proposals for the combat use of engineer troops and for the improvement of methods for their combat use;
g) drawing up a plan of orders for engineering weapons, engineering equipment and placing these orders in industry;
h) development of plans for the supply and accumulation of mobilization stocks of engineering weapons and engineering equipment;
i) the construction of engineering warehouses and landfills;
g) storage and accounting of engineering property;
j) management of the development, review and testing of new types of engineering weapons;
k) the development of staffs, timesheets and standards of engineering weapons and supplies;
l) the development of charters, manuals, instructions and manuals for the engineer troops and their supply to the Red Army.
45. The main military engineering department consists of the following departments:
a) military engineering training;
b) defensive construction;
c) Military engineering supplies and stocks;
d) departments:
a) organizational and methodological;
b) personnel;
c) financial and
d) administrative part.
The Main Military Engineering Directorate has a Technical Council.

Chapter VII. Main Quartermaster Office

46. The Main Quartermaster Office is the central body of the People’s Commissariat of Defense for the supply of the Red Army with food, fodder, clothing and economic equipment, and for housing allowances of troops.
47. The Main Quartermaster's Office is entrusted with:
a) the supply of the Red Army with food and fodder and household items;
b) supply of uniforms and equipment;
c) supply of carts, harnesses and camp kitchens;
d) development of plans for the supply and accumulation of mobilization stocks of food, clothing and wagon-economic property;
e) housing allowance of troops;
f) registration of housing funds of the People’s Commissariat of Defense;
g) drawing up a plan of non-defensive construction for the Red Army and monitoring the implementation of this plan by the Main Construction Directorate of the Armed Forces under the Council of People's Commissars of the Soviet Union;
g) selection and accounting of commanding staff of the quartermaster service and participation in its certification;
h) management of quartermaster military educational institutions;
i) the preparation of a plan for the procurement of food and fodder and a plan for orders for clothing and wagon-economic property and placing orders in industry;
j) management of boiler supervision and fire protection in the Red Army;
j) construction of quartermaster warehouses;
k) storage and accounting of food, clothing and economic property;
l) the development of staffs, timesheets and norms of food, clothing and welfare supplies;
m) the management of the development, consideration and testing of new models of military-economic supply;
n) the development of manuals, instructions and manuals for the commissary service and the supply of units and institutions of the Red Army;
48. The main quartermaster office consists of
controls:
a) food supply;
b) clothing supplies;
c) Economic and economic supply;
d) Housing-exploitation;
e) the Technical Committee;
departments:
a) mobilization planning;
b) organizational;
c) personnel;
d) warehouses and vehicles;
e) on the organization of trade for units of the Red Army;
inspections:
a) for fire protection;
b) boiler supervision in the Red Army;
branches:
a) secret
b) administrative.

Chapter VIII. Red Army Combat Training Directorate

49. The Combat Training Directorate of the Red Army is the central body of the People’s Commissariat of Defense for the management of all branches of combat training of infantry and airborne troops (personnel troops and reserve), as well as the combined arms training of all the combat arms.
50. The Combat Training Directorate is entrusted with:
a) verification of combat training of military units;
b) the study and generalization of the combat and training experience of our and foreign armies, the experience of using new tactics and new weapons and improving all branches of combat training of troops;
c) monitoring the correct use of combat manuals and instructions in the troops;
d) the development of new and correction of existing combined arms and infantry combat manuals and manuals, as well as military training programs;
e) providing combat training of troops with monetary and material means;
f) submission to the People’s Commissar of Defense of conclusions on annual attestations for combined arms generals, as well as for senior officers represented for appointment to senior positions;
g) submission to the People's Commissar annually by October 15 of a report on the state of combat training of troops;
g) submission for approval to the People's Commissar of the annual plan for inspecting troops.
51. The combat training department consists of the following departments:
a) combined arms training;
b) the preparation of combined arms headquarters and military rear areas;
c) program and methodological;
d) infantry combat training;
e) preparing an infantry stock;
f) combat training of the airborne troops;
g) combined arms and infantry charters;
g) planning material support for combat training;
h) the general part.

Chapter IX. Air Defense Administration

51. The Air Defense Administration is the central body of the People's Commissar of Defense for organizing air defense in the Red Army and for inspecting, on instructions from the Government, the preparations for the local Air Defense.
52. The Air Defense Administration is entrusted with:
a) combat training of the Air Defense Forces of the Red Army and parts of barrage and observation balloons;
b) the management of military schools of the Air Defense;
c) selection and registration of the commanding composition of the Air Defense forces and participation in its certification;
d) inspecting, according to the instructions of the Government, the preparations for the local Air Defense of the points and objects of the Air Defense and checking the state of combat readiness of these points, regardless of their departmental affiliation;
e) determination, according to the instructions of the Government, of the border of the part of the territory of the Soviet Union threatened by air attacks, as well as the borders of the first and second air defense zones;
f) compilation, at the direction of the Government, of a list of settlements of the threatened zone of the territory of the Soviet Union, classified as "air defense points";
g) determination of the deadlines for the readiness of measures of local Air Defense in points and objects of Air Defense in the first and second zones of Air Defense;
g) development and submission to the Government for approval through the People's Commissar of Defense of the total scope and nature of the activities of the local Air Defense, to be carried out at points and at the objects of Air Defense in the first and second zones of Air Defense;
h) the organization, at the direction of the Government, of the air surveillance, warning and communication service and the provision of timely notification of air danger to the local Air Defense service;
i) drawing up a plan of orders for the air defense weapons of the army and placing orders in industry;
d) review and testing of new air defense weapons;
j) supplying the Air Defense forces with Air Defense means;
k) development of plans for the supply and accumulation of mobilization reserves of Air Defense assets;
l) development of staffs, timesheets and standards of armament by means of Air Defense;
m) the development of charters, manuals, instructions and manuals for the Air Defense Forces and their supply to the Red Army.
53. The Air Defense Directorate consists of the following departments:
a) organizational and mobilization;
b) Air Defense Services;
c) air defense;
d) air surveillance, alerts and communications;
e) local defense;
e) personnel;
g) planning and financial;
g) export-technical [see note 3 to the text];
h) the general (secret) part.

Chapter X. Office of Communications of the Red Army

54. The Communications Directorate of the Red Army is the central authority of the People's Commissariat of Defense for the management of combat training of the communications troops, for the organization of official communications in the Red Army and for the supply of communications assets to troops.
55. The Communications Administration of the Red Army is entrusted with:
a) combat training of communications troops and all military branches on communications;
b) the management of military educational institutions of communications;
c) selection and accounting of the commanding staff of communications and participation in its certification;
d) the development, at the direction of the General Staff, of proposals for the best use of communications for the interaction of land, sea and air forces in wartime and for the preparation of the rear and theaters of operations with regard to communications;
e) drawing up a plan of orders for communications and telemechanical equipment and placing orders in industry;
f) consideration and testing of new models of communications and special equipment;
g) the development of plans to supply the army with communications and special equipment and the accumulation of mobilization reserves of these funds;
g) the construction of communications;
h) storage and accounting of communications;
i) research work on communications and telemechanics and conducting field and military tests of communications equipment;
g) the development of staffs, time sheets, and standards for supplying the army with communications and special equipment;
j) the development of charters, manuals, regulations, instructions and training manuals for communications troops and the supply of them to the Red Army;
k) monitoring, as directed by the Government, the construction of civilian radio stations, the operation of civilian broadcasting and other radio stations both in peacetime and in wartime;
l) the distribution, as directed by the Government, of wave ranges for all military and civilian radio stations;
m) the development of issues to combat radio interference;
n) organization and management of the postal service.
56. The Communications Directorate of the Red Army consists of the following departments:
a) combat training;
b) operational-technical;
c) mobilization planning;
d) telephone and telegraph weapons;
e) radio weapons;
e) special equipment;
g) warehouses and workshops;
g) personnel;
h) financial;
i) scientific and technical committee
d) the secret part and
j) the general part.
Note: The communications commander of the Red Army is directly subordinated to: communications units of the High Command reserve, communications center of the People's Commissariat of Defense, research and testing institute of communications and special equipment, central dog breeding school, and central communications warehouses.

Chapter XI. Office of Military Chemical Defense

57. The Office of the Military Chemical Defense is the central body of the People's Commissariat of Defense for the combat training of chemical forces, chemical training of all branches of the armed forces, and the supply of chemical weapons and property to units of the Red Army.
58. The Office of the Military Chemical Defense is entrusted with:
a) military and chemical training of chemical troops, chemical training of all military branches;
b) management of chemical military educational institutions of the Red Army;
c) selection and registration of the commanding composition of chemical forces and participation in its certification;
d) development, at the direction of the General Staff, of proposals for the use of chemical troops and improvement of their combat employment methods;
e) drawing up a plan of orders for chemical weapons and placing orders in industry;
f) consideration and testing of new samples of military chemical weapons;
g) development of plans for the supply and accumulation of mobilization stocks of chemical weapons, materials and means of chemical protection;
g) the construction of chemical warehouses and landfills;
h) storage and accounting of chemical weapons and property;
i) development of staffs, timesheets and chemical weapons standards;
d) drawing up charters, manuals, instructions and manuals for chemical troops and supplying them with the Red Army.
59. The Office of Military Chemical Defense consists of the departments:
a) combat training of chemical forces;
b) combat training of the chemical service;
c) organizational and staffing and combat use;
d) mobilization planning;
e) respiratory tract protection;
e) skin protection;
g) military and rear chemical machines;
g) military chemicals and degassing;
h) warehouses, bases, workshops and repairs;
i) research;
g) financial;
k) personnel and
k) the general (secret) part.

Chapter XII. Red Army Fuel Supply Administration

60. The Directorate of Fuel Supply of the Red Army is the central body of the People's Commissariat of Defense of the Soviet Union for the supply of the Red Army with all types of fuel and lubricants.
61. The Fuel Supply Administration is entrusted with:
a) combat training of the rear organs for the supply of fuels and lubricants and the preparation of means for pumping, refueling and transportation;
b) selection and registration of the commanding staff of the fuel supply service and participation in its certification;
c) development, at the direction of the General Staff, of a plan for the accumulation of mobilization reserves and mobilization training of the Red Army for the supply of fuel;
d) drawing up plans for orders for fuels and lubricants, means of mechanized pumping, transportation and placing orders in industry;
e) consideration and testing of new samples of means for pumping and transporting fuel;
f) the construction of gas depots and gas depots;
g) storage and accounting of fuels and lubricants;
g) the development of staffs, timesheets and fuel consumption standards;
h) the development of manuals, instructions and teaching aids for the fuel supply service and the supply of them to the Red Army.
62. The fuel supply department consists of the following departments:
a) mobilization;
b) supply and operation of fuels and lubricants;
c) supply and operation of containers pumping and refueling, and means of transportation of fuel;
d) operation of warehouses of fuels and lubricants;
e) scientific and technical;
e) financial;
g) capital construction of warehouses;
branches:
a) training and accounting personnel;
b) accumulation, refreshment and accounting of mobilization reserves of fuels and lubricants;
c) secret and
d) the general part.

Chapter XIII. Department of military educational institutions of the Red Army

63. The Directorate of Military Educational Institutions of the Red Army is the central body of the People's Commissariat of Defense of the Soviet Union for the programmatic and methodical management of infantry military schools and infantry improvement courses for the chief of staff and reserve.
64. The Department of Military Educational Institutions is entrusted with:
a) organization of the educational process and combat training of cadets;
b) inspection of infantry military schools and infantry courses to improve the personnel of the personnel and stock in all respects;
c) selection and registration of the commanding and teaching staff of schools and participation in its certification;
d) conducting acceptance tests, graduations and deductions of cadets of higher educational institutions;
e) drawing up a plan for the acquisition of military academies;
f) drawing up instructions and instructions on the questions of admission and graduation of students to military academies and military departments;
g) the supply of military academies with teaching aids and teaching and laboratory equipment;
g) preparation of a consolidated plan for the development of research work;
h) consideration of plans for the training and advanced training of the faculty of military academies;
i) the supply of higher education institutions with material and technical means, teaching aids and military equipment;
g) the development of manuals, instructions, teaching aids for higher education institutions of the Red Army.
The management of military educational institutions consists of the following departments:
a) educational;
b) academic;
c) personnel;
d) organizational and planning;
e) the inspectorate;
f) the general (secret) part.

Chapter XIV. Office of the Red Army

65. The personnel management of the Red Army is the central body of the People’s Commissariat of Defense of the Soviet Union for staffing the Red Army with commanding staff and accumulating a reserve of commanding staff.
66. The Personnel Department is entrusted with:
a) quantitative and qualitative accounting of the commanding composition of the frame and stock and the management of this accounting on the ground;
b) the study and selection of the commanding staff of all military branches (except for the air force, political personnel, artillery, engineering troops, communications, armored, medical and veterinary);
c) report to the People’s Commissar of Defense of issues:
1) on the appointment and relocation of the commanding staff;
2) on the appropriation of military ranks to the personnel and personnel reserve;
3) on awarding the commanding staff with orders and medals;
4) on rewarding the commanding staff with badges;
5) on the appointment of pensions and benefits to the commanding staff and their families;
67. The personnel management of the Red Army consists of the departments:
a) combined arms;
b) military schools (combined arms);
c) organizational and mobilization;
d) accounting and statistics;
e) on assignment, ranks, awards and pensions;
e) general.

Chapter XV. Sanitary Administration of the Red Army

68. The Sanitary Administration of the Red Army is the central body of the People's Commissariat of Defense of the Soviet Union for the management of the sanitary service in the Red Army.
69. The Sanitary Administration is entrusted with:
a) combat and special training of the sanitary service;
b) management of medical military educational institutions;
c) selection and registration of the commanding staff of the sanitary service and participation in its certification;
d) development of a plan for the supply and accumulation of mobilization reserves for the sanitary service;
e) development of measures for medical, medical-evacuation, anti-epidemic and sanitary-chemical services of the Red Army for wartime;
f) the construction of sanitary warehouses and sanitary medical institutions;
g) storage and accounting of sanitary property;
g) the development of staffs, timesheets and sanitary standards;
h) the development of manuals, instructions and training aids for the sanitary service and their supply to the Red Army.
70. Sanitary management consists of departments:
a) organizational and mobilization;
b) medical;
c) sanitary and epidemic;
d) health resort and child care facilities;
e) personnel;
e) medical training and health promotion;
g) supply;
g) financial;
h) departments:
a) scientific publishing and inventions;
b) toxicological and sanitary-chemical protection;
c) secret;
d) administrative.
Note: There is a scientific medical council under the head of the Sanitary Administration. Directly managed by the head of the Sanitary Administration are:
a) The Central Military Medical Commission;
b) Scientific Research Educational Sanitary Institute of the Red Army;
c) Institute of Aviation Medicine of the Red Army;
d) Central Military Hospital;
e) Central sanatoriums and rest houses of the Red Army.

Chapter XVI. Veterinary Administration of the Red Army

71. The Veterinary Administration of the Red Army is the central body of the People's Commissariat of Defense of the Soviet Union for the management of the veterinary service of the Red Army.
72. The Veterinary Administration is entrusted with:
a) combat training of the veterinary service;
b) management of veterinary military educational institutions;
c) selection and accounting of the commanding staff of the veterinary service and participation in its certification;
d) development of plans for the supply and accumulation of mobilization reserves for the veterinary service;
e) construction of veterinary warehouses and veterinary medical institutions;
f) storage and accounting of veterinary property;
g) the development of staffs, timesheets and veterinary supply standards;
g) the development of manuals, instructions and manuals for the veterinary service and the supply of them to the Red Army.
73. Veterinary management consists of departments:
a) organizational and mobilization;
b) medical and sanitary;
c) combat training;
d) planning and distribution;
e) procurement;
e) personnel.

Chapter XVII. Office of the People's Commissar of Defense

74. The Office of Affairs is the executive body of the People's Commissar of Defense for matters directly addressed to the People’s Commissar. At the head of the Department of Affairs is the head of the department, who reports directly to the People's Commissar.
75. The Office of Affairs under the People's Commissar of Defense is entrusted with:
a) the management of cases submitted to the decision of the People's Commissar;
b) the conduct of affairs of the People's Commissariat of Defense, sent for permission to higher state institutions;
c) preparation of materials for the people's commissar of defense and his deputies for meetings of the Government and the Main Military Council;
d) preliminary consideration of all legislative cases before they are submitted to the Main Military Council and to the Government and conduct of business on legislative issues;
e) combining and directing the activities of departments in drawing up a code of military decisions;
f) checking compliance with the law of draft orders submitted to the People's Defense Commissioner;
g) editing and publication of orders and instructions of the People's Commissar of Defense and resolutions of the Main Military Council;
g) publication, in accordance with the instructions of the People's Commissar of Defense, circulars of the People’s Commissariat of Defense;
h) control over the execution of orders, orders and decisions of the People's Commissar of Defense, decisions of the Main Military Council, as well as the execution of tasks of the Government of the People's Commissariat of Defense;
i) publication of collections of orders and reference books to them;
j) legal advice and issuance of certificates to departments under laws and orders;
j) special management. the activities of legal advisers of central administrations and military districts.
76. Management of affairs consists of departments:
a) administrative drill;
b) orders;
c) government tasks and the Main Military Council;
d) legislative;
e) legal advisory part.
The head of the Department of Affairs submits:
a) the reception of the People's Commissar of Defense;
b) the economic department of the central departments of the People's Commissariat of Defense;
c) the commandant's office of the People's Commissariat of Defense;
d) the depot of the People's Commissariat of Defense;
e) archive of the People's Commissariat of Defense;
f) printing house of the People's Commissariat of Defense;
g) the postal service of the People's Commissariat of Defense;
g) the telephone station of the People's Commissariat of Defense.

Chapter XVIII. Finance Department at the People's Commissar of Defense

77. The finance department is the central organ of the People's Commissariat of Defense of the Soviet Union for financing the Red Army.
78. The financial department is entrusted with:
a) financing the costs of maintaining the Red Army and the costs of mobilization during the war;
b) selection and accounting of financial workers and participation in their certification;
c) development of plans for financing industrial enterprises, construction, research and experimental work, and control of financial and budgetary discipline in units and establishments of the Red Army;
d) the development of staffs, timesheets and allowances;
e) departmental arbitration in financial disputes between units and institutions of the Red Army;
f) drawing up instructions and regulations on financial matters and supplying them to the Red Army.
79. The financial department consists of the following departments:
a) organizational and mobilization;
b) consolidated planning;
c) estimated;
d) financing order plans;
e) financing of construction;
f) financing of industrial enterprises;
g) tariffication of military personnel and full-time civilian employees;
g) monetary allowance of the personnel of the Red Army;
h) central accounting;
) frames;
i) secret record keeping;
l) financial inspection and
d) the general part.

Chapter XIX. Heads of the main and central departments

80. The chiefs of the main and central departments are the closest assistants to the People's Commissar of Defense for carrying out the tasks of combat, mobilization and political training of the Red Army and for the material and technical supply of the Red Army.
81. The chiefs of the main and central departments are appointed by the Council of People's Commissars of the Soviet Union on the proposal of the People's Commissar of Defense.
82. The chiefs of the main and central departments are responsible for the combat and mobilization readiness of the corresponding type of troops, for their material support, for the compliance of equipment with military tasks and for the correct use of personnel.
83. The duties of the heads of the main and central departments are:
a) direct the activities of the departments entrusted to them to the exact execution of the tasks assigned to them;
b) monitor the accurate and timely implementation of the decrees and orders of the Government entrusted to them by the departments;
c) monitor the fast and proper implementation of orders and instructions of the People’s Commissar of Defense, his deputies and the chief of the General Staff;
d) monitor the timely preparation of an order plan, financial plan and material and technical supply plan for the departments entrusted to them;
e) the general direction and control over the activities of the respective district departments.
84. The chiefs of the main and central departments of the Red Army enjoy the following rights:
a) give instructions on the departments and district departments entrusted to them, aimed at implementing the decisions of the Government and the orders of the People's Commissar of Defense;
b) inspect military units, institutions and establishments of the Red Army in their specialty;
c) attend meetings of the Main Military Council on issues related to the activities of the departments entrusted to them;
d) present for the assignment of the next military rank and for awards to employees of the departments entrusted to them;
e) to issue cash awards and benefits to employees of the departments entrusted to them from the amounts allocated for this purpose;
f) the chiefs of the main departments in the general management procedure and in relation to their subordinates enjoy the rights of the commander of the district troops, and the heads of the central departments – the rights of the corps commander.

Chapter XX. Heads of Departments of the People's Commissariat of Defense

85. The heads of departments of the People's Commissariat of Defense are appointed and dismissed by the People's Commissar of Defense.
86. Heads of departments are required to:
a) to distribute incoming papers by departments;
b) ensure that the execution of cases and the procurement of securities is carried out in accordance with the resolutions of the head of the department and in a timely manner;
c) ensure that reports and all outgoing papers are compiled clearly, concisely, in the prescribed form and that all laws, orders and references necessary for the report are attached;
d) ensure that all instructions and requests are executed accurately and on time, and if delayed, report to the head of the department;
e) to carry out at least once a year audits of departments and paperwork.

Chapter XXI. Inspections at the People's Commissar of Defense of the Soviet Union

87. The following are inspections of the People’s Commissar of Defense of the Soviet Union:
a) Infantry;
b) cavalry;
c) artillery;
d) military air forces;
e) armored forces;
f) Engineering troops and
g) Communications of the Red Army.
88. Inspections of the arms of service are the organ of the People's Commissar of Defense of the Soviet Union for the verification of combat training and mobilization readiness of troops.
General-General Provisions on Inspectors of the Red Army
89. Inspector Generals are elected by the People's Commissar of Defense and appointed by the Council of People's Commissars of the Soviet Union.
90. Inspector Generals report directly to the People’s Commissar of Defense.
91. Inspector Generals are obliged, each in their specialty, to systematically check the combat training of the troops, as well as the activities of institutions (other than central ones), closely connected with the combat training of the army.
92. Inspector Generals are members of the Higher Attestation Commission.
93. On the results of each inspection, inspectors submit a brief report to the people's commissar of defense, and by October 15 present him an annual report on combat training with a proposal of the necessary measures.
94. Under the Inspector General are their deputies and assistants, commanders for assignments and the office; The composition of inspections is determined by the states.
Inspector Responsibilities
95. To carry out, according to the plan approved by the People’s Commissar of Defense, personally or through their deputies, assistants and persons involved in inspections with the permission of the People’s Commissar of Defense, inspect the troops and verify their combat training in the specialty.
96. To monitor the development of the troops of their specialty, the improvement of combat training of troops and its uniformity.
97. To monitor the correct application of the charters, instructions, orders of the People’s Commissar of Defense, training programs and other provisions for the training and combat training of troops.
98. To verify the correctness of the conduct of educational and combat training in military schools and refresher courses.
99. Provide opinions on issues regarding the improvement and improvement of all branches of training, weapons, equipment and the material part of their troop role.
100. To study the formulation of the training of troops in foreign armies, to monitor the development of tactics and the emergence of new equipment, and to report on all material matters to the people's defense commissioner.
101. In case of major omissions and incorrectnesses in the training or activity of the troops that could adversely affect their combat training, immediately inform the commander of the district troops about this and report to the People’s Defense Commissioner.
Inspector Rights
102. During inspections and inspections, give instructions to the troops aimed at the correct implementation of the charters, instructions, orders of the People’s Commissar of Defense and training programs.
103. Raise questions about the measures necessary for the comprehensive improvement of all branches of training, combat training, weapons, equipment and the material part of a kind of troops.
104. Raise questions about the production of experiments necessary for the comprehensive improvement of troops.
105. Attend all maneuvers.
106. Attend meetings of the Military Council and meetings of the People’s Commissar of Defense for combat training of troops.
107. In the general management order and in relation to his subordinates, he enjoys the rights of the commander of the district troops.
About deputy inspectors
108. Deputy inspectors are elected and appointed by the People’s Commissar of Defense.
109. For all independent field trips, deputy inspectors shall enjoy the full rights of inspectors and bear the same duties.
About Inspector Assistants
110. Inspector assistants are selected by inspectors from commanders with at least three years of command experience as a separate unit and from relevant specialists and are appointed by order of the People’s Commissariat of Defense.
111. To verify combat training, assistant inspectors receive an order from the inspector that accurately defines the purpose and purpose of each mission. Upon returning from a business trip, they submit a report to their inspector.

Chapter XXII. Military Publishing House of the People's Commissariat of Defense of the Soviet Union

112. The military publishing house is the central organ of the People’s Commissariat of Defense of the Soviet Union for the publication of military and official literature.
113. The military publishing house operates on the basis of full economic calculation and has its own printing base.
114. Thematic and production and financial publishing plans of the Military Publishing House are approved by the People’s Commissariat of Defense.
115. The editorial and publishing activities of the Military Publishing House are controlled by the Main Directorate of Political Propaganda of the Red Army.
116. The military publishing house consists of the following departments:
a) a military book;
b) military-political and military-historical;
c) posters;
d) secret;
e) periodicals;
f) administrative and
g) the department of military fiction.

Chapter XXIII. Management of military stud farms of the Red Army

117. The management of military stud farms is the central administration of the People's Commissariat of Defense of the Soviet Union.
118. The management of military stud farms operates on the basis of full economic calculation.
The management of military studs is entrusted with:
a) management of production and economic activities of military stud farms;
b) drawing up production and financial plans and material supply plans for military stud farms;
c) the supply of military studs with means of transport, agricultural machinery, fuel and household equipment;
d) the development of staffs, timesheets and norms of economic supply;
e) selection, accounting, training and appointment of personnel for military stud farms;
f) the management of the military department at the Moscow Zootechnical Institute;
g) construction at military stud factories;
h) preparation of manuals, instructions and manuals for military stud farms.
119. The management of military stud farms consists of the following departments:
a) political propaganda;
b) horse breeding;
c) agriculture;
d) livestock;
e) veterinary;
f) production planning and financial accounting;
g) construction;
g) supply and
h) administrative.

Chapter XXIV. The editors and publishers of the central organ of the People’s Commissariat of Defense of the Soviet Union "Red Star"

120. The Krasnaya Zvezda newspaper is the central organ of the People’s Commissariat of Defense of the Soviet Union for the education of commanding and rank-and-file personnel of the Red Army, the promotion of combat training tasks and the development of advanced military thought.
121. The direction and control of the activities of the newspaper "Red Star" is vested in the General Staff and the Main Directorate of Political Propaganda of the Red Army.
122. The editors of the newspaper "Red Star" consists of the following departments:
a) combined arms;
b) artillery and motorized forces;
c) aviation;
d) military educational institutions;
e) propaganda;
e) culture;
g) the party-Komsomol;
g) foreign;
h) information;
i) correspondent network;
j) print and bibliography reviews;
j) letters;
k) execution;
l) the secretariat.

Russian State Military Archive. Fund 4. Inventory 14. Case 2431. Sheet 161–202. Script.

Notes:

1. It is dated according to the litter printed at the end of the document: "4 copies were sent on September 5, 1940". The first sheet of the document contains the following handwritten inscriptions: "Initial Project" (red pencil), "Case Management Option" (purple ink). At the bottom of the sheet is an office registration stamp – "No. 1687, December 31, 1940, 4th Division of the Office of the People's Commissariat of Defense".
2. The words "dismissed by the Council of People's Commissars of the Soviet Union" in the text of the document are underlined and there is a question mark in the margin.
3. So in the document. Apparently, it should be – expert-technical.

== People's Commissars ==
- Kliment Voroshilov (June 20, 1934 – May 7, 1940)
- Semyon Timoshenko (May 7, 1940 – July 19, 1941)
- Joseph Stalin (July 19, 1941 – February 25, 1946)

== Key Documents ==
Order of the People's Commissariat of Defense of the Soviet Union No. 110 declaring decrees of the Presidium of the Supreme Council of the Soviet Union on the appointment of Kliment Voroshilov as Deputy Chairman of the Council of People's Commissars of the Soviet Union and Chairman of the Defense Committee under the Council of People's Commissars of the Soviet Union, Semyon Tymoshenko – People's Commissar of Defense of the Soviet Union

Order of the People's Commissariat of Defense of the Soviet Union No. 110 announcing decrees of the Presidium of the Supreme Council of the Soviet Union on the appointment of Kliment Voroshilov as deputy chairman of the Council of People's Commissars of the Soviet Union and chairman of the Committee of Defense under the Council of People's Commissars of the Soviet Union, Semyon Tymoshenko - People's Commissar of Defense of the Soviet Union

May 8, 1940

I declare the Decrees of the Presidium of the Supreme Council of the Soviet Union of May 7, 1940.
1) on the appointment of Marshal of the Soviet Union Kliment Voroshilov as Deputy Chairman of the Council of People's Commissars of the Soviet Union and chairman of the Defense Committee under the Council of People's Commissars of the Soviet Union;
2) on the appointment of Marshal of the Soviet Union Semyon Timoshenko People's Commissar of Defense of the Soviet Union.

People's Commissar of Defense of the Soviet Union Marshal of the Soviet Union Semyon Tymoshenko

Decree of the Presidium of the Supreme Council of the Soviet Union on the appointment of Marshal of the Soviet Union Kliment Voroshilov as Deputy Chairman of the Council of People's Commissars of the Soviet Union and chairman of the Defense Committee under the Council of People's Commissars of the Soviet Union

To appoint Marshal of the Soviet Union Kliment Efremovich Voroshilov as Deputy Chairman of the Council of People's Commissars of the Soviet Union and Chairman of the Defense Committee under the Council of People's Commissars of the Soviet Union with relieving the People's Commissar of Defense of the Soviet Union.

Moscow Kremlin.
May 7, 1940

Chairman of the Presidium of the Supreme Council of the Soviet Union Mikhail Kalinin

Secretary of the Presidium of the Supreme Council of the Soviet Union Alexander Gorkin

Decree of the Presidium of the Supreme Council of the Soviet Union on the appointment of Marshal of the Soviet Union Semyon Timoshenko People's Commissar of Defense of the Soviet Union

Appoint Marshal of the Soviet Union Semyon Konstantinovich Timoshenko People's Commissar of Defense of the Soviet Union with his release from the duties of commander of the Kiev Special Military District.

Moscow Kremlin.

May 7, 1940

Chairman of the Presidium of the Supreme Council of the Soviet Union Mikhail Kalinin

Secretary of the Presidium of the Supreme Council of the Soviet Union Alexander Gorkin

– Russian State Military Archive. Fund 4. Inventory 15. Case 30. Sheet 206. Typographic Copy.

Published in collection: Russian Archive: The Great Patriotic War.
Order of the People's Commissariat of Defense of the Soviet Union No. 0036 "On the Formation of Inspections under the People's Commissar of Defense"

Order of the People's Commissariat of Defense of the Soviet Union No. 0036 "On the Formation of Inspections under the People's Commissar of Defense"

July 26, 1940

1. To inspect the troops and verify their combat training, form the following inspections under the People's Commissar of Defense of the Soviet Union: 1) Inspection of infantry of the Red Army; 2) Inspection of the cavalry of the Red Army; 3) Inspection of artillery of the Red Army; 4) Inspection of the air forces of the Red Army; 5) Inspection of armored forces of the Red Army; 6) Inspection of the engineering forces of the Red Army; 7) Inspection of communications of the Red Army.

2. At the head of the inspections, put the inspector general of the combat arms.

3. Assigned: 1) The inspector general of the infantry is Lieutenant General Andrei Smirnov. 2) The Inspector General of the Cavalry – Colonel General of the Oka Gorodovikov. 3) Artillery Inspector General – Artillery Lieutenant General Mikhail Parsegov. 4) Inspector General of the Armored Forces – Major General of the Tank Troops Boris Vershinin. 5) Inspector General of the Engineering Troops – Major General of the Engineering Troops Mikhail Vorobyov. 6) Communications Inspector General – Lieutenant General of the Communications Troops Ivan Naydenov.

4. Order: a) the inspector general of infantry to form the Inspection of infantry, having drawn up the Office of the chief of infantry on its formation; b) the cavalry inspector general to reorganize the Cavalry Inspectorate into a new state cavalry inspectorate; c) inspector generals of artillery, air force, armored forces, engineering troops and communications troops to form the appropriate Inspectorates. Inspections should be completed by August 5 of this year.

5. On July 29 of this year, the chief of the General Staff must submit for approval the states and the inspection regulations.

People's Commissar of Defense of the Soviet Union Marshal of the Soviet Union Semyon Tymoshenko

– Russian State Military Archive. Fund 4. Inventory 15. Case 26. Sheet 8 and Reverse 8. Typographic Copy.
Order of the People's Commissariat of Defense of the Soviet Union No. 0037 "On the Structure of the People's Commissariat of Defense"

Order of the People's Commissariat of Defense of the Soviet Union No. 0037 "On the Structure of the People's Commissariat of Defense" on July 26, 1940

1. In connection with the formation of the main departments of the People's Commissariat of Defense, in order to improve the leadership of the troops as part of the People's Commissariat of Defense of the Soviet Union, have: 1) General Staff of the Red Army, 2) The Main Directorate of Political Propaganda of the Red Army, 3) The Main Directorate of the Air Force of the Red Army, 4) The main artillery directorate of the Red Army, 5) The Main Armored Directorate of the Red Army, 6) The Main Military Engineering Directorate of the Red Army, 7) The main quartermaster department of the Red Army, 8) Management of combat training of the Red Army, 9) Air Defense Administration of the Red Army, 10) Office of Communications of the Red Army, 11) Office of the military chemical defense of the Red Army, 12) Fuel supply department of the Red Army, 13) Directorate of higher military educational institutions of the Red Army, 14) Office of the military educational institutions of the Red Army, 15) Office of the Red Army, 16) Sanitary Administration of the Red Army, 17) Veterinary Administration of the Red Army, 18) Management of affairs at the People’s Commissar of Defense, 19) the financial department under the people's commissar of defense.

Inspections at the People's Commissar of Defense: 1) Inspection of the infantry of the Red Army, 2) Inspection of the cavalry of the Red Army, 3) Inspection of artillery of the Red Army, 4) Inspection of armored forces of the Red Army, 5) Inspection of the Air Force of the Red Army, 6) Inspection of engineering troops of the Red Army, 7) Inspection of communications of the Red Army.

2. Assigned: The head of the Communications Department is Major General Nikolay Gapich. The head of the Office of Military Chemical Defense is Major General of the Technical Forces Pyotr Melnikov. The head of the Fuel Supply Directorate is Major General of the Tank Forces Pyotr Kotov. The head of the Directorate of Higher Military Educational Institutions is Lieutenant General Georgy Safronov. The head of the Department of Military Educational Institutions is Lieutenant General Ilya Smirnov. The head of the Sanitary Administration is the team doctor Yefim Smirnov. The head of the Veterinary Administration is the team doctor Kuzma Borkovsky. Major General Mikhail Dratvin is the head of the Office of the People's Commissar of Defense. The chief of the finance department at the people's commissar of defense is Major General of the quartermaster service Yakov Khotenko.

3. Order: 1) Rename: a) Political Directorate of the Red Army to the Main Directorate of Political Propaganda of the Red Army. b) Office of the commanding staff of the Red Army in the Office of Personnel of the Red Army.

2) Include the 5th Directorate of the Red Army in the General Staff of the Red Army.

3) Disband: a) The General Directorate of the Red Army, its functions and affairs, shall be transferred to the General Staff of the Red Army. b) Office of the Chief of Infantry, with the appeal of personnel to staff the Inspection of Infantry. c) The Department of inventions of the People's Commissariat of Defense of the Soviet Union, with the transfer of its functions and personnel to the corresponding main departments. I entrust my deputy Marshal of the Soviet Union, Comrade Kulik, with the dismissal and transfer of cases of the inventions department of the People's Commissariat of Defense of the Soviet Union to the main departments. d) the Control Group under the People's Commissariat of Defense of the Soviet Union, transferring its affairs and correspondence to the Office of Affairs under the People's Commissar of Defense of the Soviet Union. d) Inspection of Osoaviakhim, transferring the affairs and functions of the Infantry Inspection.

4) Transmit: a) Inspection of physical training and sports of the Red Army in the Inspection of infantry. b) Inspection of military bands of the Red Army in the Inspection of infantry. c) The economic department of the central administration of the People's Commissariat of Defense in the Office of Affairs under the People's Commissioner of Defense of the Soviet Union

4. By August 5, the chief of the General Staff of the Red Army should present the states, and by August 25, the draft regulations on the People's Commissariat of Defense of the Soviet Union.

5. The reorganization of the central departments of the People's Commissariat of Defense is to be completed by August 20 of this year.

6. The orders of the People's Commissar of Defense of the Soviet Union of 1939 No. 0156 and No. 0223 to cancel.

People's Commissar of Defense of the Soviet Union Marshal of the Soviet Union Semyon Tymoshenko.

– Russian State Military Archive. Fund 4. Inventory 15. Case 26. Sheet 9–10 Reverse. Typographic Copy.
Order of the People's Commissariat of Defense of the Soviet Union No. 0368 "On the Reorganization of the Air Defense Directorate into the Main Directorate of Air Defense of the Red Army"

December 27, 1940

Order: 1. To transform the Air Defense Department of the Red Army into the Main Air Defense Department of the Red Army. 2. The head of the Main Directorate of Air Defense shall be entrusted with the management of the organization of air defense of the territory of the Soviet Union and the development of issues and the use of all air defense equipment: anti-aircraft artillery, anti-aircraft machine guns, anti-aircraft searchlights, fighter aircraft dedicated to air defense points, air defense fences and air surveillance services, alerts and communications. 3. By January 5, 1941, to the Chief of the General Staff, submit for approval the states and the draft regulation on the Main Directorate of Air Defense of the Red Army.

People's Commissar of Defense of the Soviet Union Marshal of the Soviet Union Semyon Tymoshenko

– Russian State Military Archive. Fund 4. Inventory 15. Case 27. Sheet 573. Typographic reprint.
Order of the People's Commissariat of Defense of the Soviet Union No. 0011 "On the Formation of the 3rd Directorate of the People's Commissariat of Defense of the Soviet Union"

February 13, 1941^{1}

In accordance with the decree of the Government of the Soviet Union of February 8, 1941:
1. To form the 3rd Directorate under the People’s Commissar of Defense of the Soviet Union, entrusting him with the following tasks:
a) the fight against counter-revolution, espionage, sabotage, sabotage and all kinds of anti-Soviet manifestations in the Red Army;
b) identifying and informing the command of the formations and units of the Red Army about all the shortcomings in the condition of the army units and about all available compromising materials and information on the military personnel of the Red Army.
2. The 3rd Office of the People’s Commissariat of Defense of the Soviet Union performs these tasks by:
a) the organization of an agent-informational apparatus in the army and among the civilian population, having direct contact with military units, institutions, a supply apparatus and individual military personnel;
b) conducting investigations in cases of counter-revolution, espionage, sabotage, treason, sabotage in the Red Army and among the above-mentioned civilians, and through searches, arrests and seizures in connection with this.
3. To establish that the recruitment of agents among the above-mentioned civilians, as well as arrests among them, are carried out by the 3rd Directorate of the People’s Commissariat of Defense of the Soviet Union and subordinate peripheral bodies in coordination with the relevant bodies of the People’s Commissariat of State Security of the Soviet Union by territoriality.
4. To appoint Comrade Anatoly Mikheev, head of the 3rd Directorate of the People’s Commissariat of Defense of the Soviet Union, giving him the rights of the head of the Main Directorate of the People’s Commissariat of Defense, according^{2} to the Regulation on the Head of the 3rd Directorate of the People’s Commissariat of Defense of the Soviet Union.^{3}
Reception of cases, arrested, loans, cash allocations, property and vehicles of the former Special Department of the Main Directorate of State Security of the People’s Commissariat of Internal Affairs of the Soviet Union is completed within 5 days.
5. To the head of the 3rd Directorate of the People’s Commissariat of Defense of the Soviet Union, Major of State Security, Comrade Mikheev, to develop and submit for approval to me the regulation on the work of the 3rd Directorate of the People’s Commissariat of Defense of the Soviet Union.
6. The following order of subordination of bodies of the 3rd Directorate of the People’s Defense Commissariat of the Soviet Union is established:
a) the head of the 3rd Directorate of the People’s Commissariat of Defense of the Soviet Union is subordinate to the People’s Commissar of Defense of the Soviet Union;
b) the head of the third department of the military district (front) reports to the head of the 3rd Directorate of the People’s Commissariat of Defense and the People’s Commissar of Defense of the Soviet Union;
c) the head of the third department of the army reports to the head of the third department of the district (front) and the commander of the troops of the district (front);
d) the head of the third division of the corps, which is not part of the army, reports to the chief of the third division of the okrug (front) and the commander of the troops of the okrug (front);
e) the head of the third division of the corps, which is part of the army, reports to the chief of the third division of the army and the army commander;
f) the chief of the third division reports to the chief of the third division of the corps and the corps commander;
g) the authorized representative of the third division in the regiment reports to the chief of the third division and the division commander.
7. To the head of the 3rd Directorate of the People's Commissariat of Defense of the Soviet Union, Major State Security Comrade Mikheev, submit to me for approval the structure, staff, staffing and tariff list of the 3rd Directorate of the People's Commissariat of Defense of the Soviet Union and its subordinate bodies.
All appointments and relocations of operational personnel from an authorized person and above shall be given by my order.
8. To extend to the personnel of the 3rd Directorate and its organs the operation of the charters of the Red Army.^{4}
9.^{5} The internal routine, special command training in the 3rd Directorate of the People's Commissariat of Defense of the Soviet Union and its bodies is organized by the heads of the bodies separately from combined arms training, based on the specifics of operational work;^{6}
10. The commanders of divisions, corps, the commanders of armies and districts (fronts) impose penalties on the available composition of the bodies of the 3rd Directorate for misconduct not related to the performance of operational tasks.
11. To extend to the personnel of the 3rd Directorate of the People’s Commissariat of Defense of the Soviet Union and its subordinate bodies the effect of the order of the People’s Commissariat of Defense of the Soviet Union No. 227 of July 26, 1940^{7} on the procedure for applying for official matters and bringing complaints to servicemen.
12. The role and tasks of the 3rd Directorate of the People’s Commissariat of Defense of the Soviet Union should be explained to the entire commander of the Red Army up to and including the platoon commander.

People's Commissar of Defense of the Soviet Union Marshal of the Soviet Union Tymoshenko

Notes:

1. On the 1st sheet of the original document there is a resolution: “To bring the order to the commanders of the districts (front), armies and the corresponding 3 departments. Mikheev. "
2. Further, in the original text of the document, the printed words “approved by me” are crossed out.
3. The regulation is not published, partially published in the collection: 1941. Book I. Pages 763-765 (document No. 318). At the first publication, the No. and date of the order of the People's Commissariat of Defense of the Soviet Union are erroneously indicated.
4. Further, in the original text of the document, the printed word “with” is crossed out.
5. The number "9" is entered by hand instead of the printed "a)". Accordingly, the number "10" is entered by hand instead of the printed "c)".
6. Next in the text of the original document was printed paragraph "b)", crossed out. It stated: “b) the right to impose disciplinary sanctions on the personnel of bodies of the 3rd Directorate is granted to their senior staff within the framework of the approved Regulation on the 3rd Directorate”.
7. Order of the People's Commissariat of Defense of the USSR No. 227 of July 26, 1940, “On the Procedure for Appealing on Official Matters and Making Complaints by Military Personnel. Amendments to the Charter of the disciplinary and the Charter of internal service
– Russian State Military Archive. Foundation 4. Inventory 11. Case 62. Sheet 57–60. Script.

== Structure ==
=== On July 26, 1940 ===
1. General Staff of the Red Army,
2. General Directorate of Political Propaganda of the Red Army,
3. Main Directorate of the Air Forces of the Red Army,
4. Main Artillery Directorate of the Red Army,
5. Main Armored Directorate of the Red Army,
6. Main Military Engineering Directorate of the Red Army,
7. Main quartermaster department of the Red Army,
8. Department of combat training of the Red Army,
9. Air Defense Administration of the Red Army,
10. Office of Communications of the Red Army,
11. Office of the Military Chemical Defense of the Red Army,
12. Red Army Fuel Supply Administration,
13. Management of higher military educational institutions of the Red Army,
14. Department of military educational institutions of the Red Army,
15. Office of the Red Army
16. Sanitary Administration of the Red Army,
17. Veterinary Administration of the Red Army,
18. Office of the People's Commissar of Defense,
19. Finance Department at the People's Commissar of Defense.

== See also ==
- Ministry of Defense of the Soviet Union
- General base
- Ministry of Defense of the Russian Federation

== Sources ==
- Valery Artsybashev; Sergey Voitikov; et al. (2005). The Command of the Red Army in 1940–1941. The Structure and Personnel of the Central Apparatus of the People's Commissariat of Defense of the Soviet Union, Military Districts and Combined Arms Armies. Moscow, Saint Petersburg: Summer Garden. p. 272. ISBN 5-94381-137-0.
