= Kapustin Yar (selo) =

Kapustin Yar Капустин яр
- Selo
- Location within Astrakhan Oblast Location within Russia
- Coordinates: 48°34′N 45°45′E
- Country: Russia
- Region: Astrakhan Oblast
- District: Akhtubinsky District
- Time zone: UTC+4:00

Kapustin Yar (Russian: Капустин яр) is a rural locality (a selo) and the administrative center of Kapustinoyarsky Selsoviet of Akhtubinsky District, Astrakhan Oblast, Russia. The population was 5,724 as of 2010. There are 91 streets.

== Geography ==
Kapustin Yar is located 46 km northwest of Akhtubinsk (the district's administrative centre) by road. Znamensk is the nearest rural locality.
