= Mikhail Frinovsky =

Soviet security officer (1898–1940)

- Михаил Петрович Фриновский
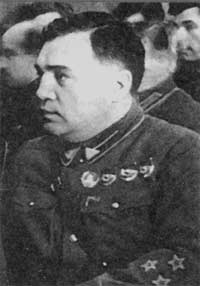
- Mikhail Frinovsky in 1935

People's Commissar for the Navy
- In office 8 September 1938 – 6 April 1939
- Preceded by: Pyotr Smirnov
- Succeeded by: Nikolai Kuznetsov

First Deputy People's Commissar for Internal Affairs and Head of the Main Directorate of State Security
- In office 15 April 1937 – 22 August 1938
- Preceded by: Yakov Agranov
- Succeeded by: Lavrentiy Beria

Chairman of the OGPU of the Azerbaijan SSR
- In office 6 August 1930 – 3 April 1933
- Preceded by: Mir Jafar Baghirov
- Succeeded by: Alexei Agrba

Personal details
- Born: Mikhail Petrovich Frinovsky; 7 February 1898 (archival records: 25 January 1900) Narovchat, Penza Governorate, Russian Empire
- Died: 4 February 1940 (aged 41) Moscow, Russian SFSR, Soviet Union
- Party: All-Union Communist Party (Bolsheviks) (1918–1939)
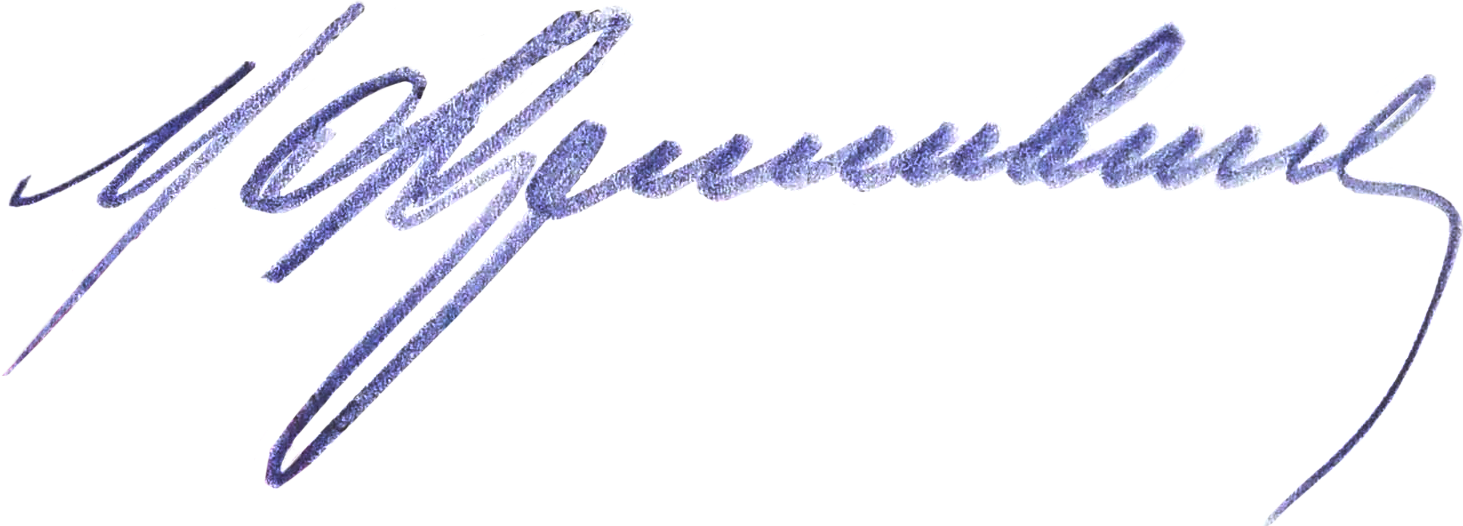
- Signature

Military service
- Allegiance: Russian Empire (1916); Russian Soviet Federative Socialist Republic (1918–1922); Soviet Union (1922–1939)
- Branch/service: Imperial Russian Army; Red Army; Cheka; GPU; OGPU; GUGB; NKVD
- Years of service: 1916; 1918–1939
- Rank: Komandarm 1st rank

Mikhail Petrovich Frinovsky (Russian: Михаи́л Петро́вич Фрино́вский; 7 February 1898 – 4 February 1940) was a Soviet state security official who served as First Deputy People's Commissar for Internal Affairs under Nikolai Yezhov during the Great Purge.

A revolutionary during the Russian Revolution, Frinovsky rose through the ranks of the Cheka and its successor agencies. During 1937–1938, he was one of the principal organizers of the Great Purge, overseeing mass arrests and executions of security, party, and military officials across the Soviet Union. In September 1938, as part of Joseph Stalin's maneuver to sideline Yezhov, Frinovsky was transferred to the post of People's Commissar of the Navy. He was arrested in April 1939 on fabricated conspiracy charges and executed in February 1940.

== Early life ==
Mikhail Petrovich Frinovsky was born on 7 February [O.S. 26 January] 1898 (according to archival records, 25 January 1900) in Narovchat in the Penza Governorate of the Russian Empire, into a Russian family of eight children. His father, Pyotr Frinovsky, was a Russian-language teacher, and his mother, Olha Semenovna (née Zheleznikova), came from the nobility. Before World War I, he studied at a religious Orthodox school in Krasnoslobodsk.

In January 1916, Frinovsky volunteered for the Imperial Russian Army, serving as a non-commissioned officer in the cavalry until deserting in August 1916. He subsequently became associated with an anarchist group and worked as an accountant at a military hospital.

In March 1917, during the February Revolution, Frinovsky took part in the assassination of Major-General Mikhail Antonovich Bem, who was suppressing anti-war protests in Penza. He also participated in the July Days in 1917. In September 1917, he joined the Red Guard in the Khamovniki District of Moscow. During the Moscow Bolshevik Uprising in October 1917, he commanded a Red Guard detachment during the storming of the Kremlin, where he was severely wounded and spent several months recovering at the hospital in Lefortovo until February 1918. Between March and July 1918, he worked as an assistant administrator at the Khodynka Hospital in Moscow.

== Career ==
In July 1918, Frinovsky joined the Russian Communist Party (Bolsheviks) and volunteered for the Red Army, serving as a squadron commander and later head of the Special Section of the 1st Cavalry Army.

In 1919, after recovering from another serious wound, he transferred to the Cheka, becoming assistant head of the active section of the Moscow Cheka Special Section. In this capacity, he took part in operations against anarchists and insurgent detachments in Ukraine. From December 1919 to April 1920, he served in the Special Section of the Southern Front. In 1920, he was chief of the active section of the Southwestern Front Special Section and deputy chief of the 1st Cavalry Army Special Section. In 1921–1922, he served as deputy chief of the Special Section and deputy commander of the operational detachment of the All-Ukrainian Cheka, and in 1922–1923 headed the general administrative section and secretariat of the Kiev provincial department of the GPU, before becoming head of the OGPU plenipotentiary representation for the South-East on 23 June 1923.

In November 1923, Frinovsky was transferred to the North Caucasus as chief of the Special Section of the North Caucasus Military District, becoming first deputy plenipotentiary representative of the OGPU in the North Caucasus in March 1924 and chief of border guards along the Black Sea coast in 1925. In July 1927, he moved to Moscow as assistant head of the Special Section of the Moscow Military District and completed senior command courses at the Frunze Military Academy that same year. From 28 November 1928 to 1 September 1930, he commanded and served as commissar of the Special Purpose Division named after F. E. Dzerzhinsky under the OGPU Collegium.

On 1 September 1930 (officially confirmed 6 August 1930), Frinovsky was appointed Chairman of the GPU/OGPU of the Azerbaijan SSR, where he helped oversee dekulakization campaigns. On 8 April 1933, he became head of the Main Directorate of Border Guards of the OGPU, directing the NKVD intervention during the Soviet invasion of Xinjiang. Following the reorganization of the security apparatus in July 1934, he headed the Main Directorate of Border and Internal Troops of the NKVD.

=== Great Purge ===
Following the dismissal of Genrikh Yagoda and the appointment of Nikolai Yezhov as head of the NKVD, Frinovsky was appointed Deputy People's Commissar for Internal Affairs on 16 October 1936, and promoted to First Deputy People's Commissar and head of the Main Directorate of State Security (GUGB) on 15 April 1937. He also served as a member of the 7th convocation of the Central Executive Committee of the Soviet Union and was elected to the 1st convocation of the Supreme Soviet of the Soviet Union in 1937.

As Yezhov's second-in-command, Frinovsky oversaw Yagoda's interrogation—in which Joseph Stalin took a personal interest—and co-managed arrest and execution quotas across the Soviet Union under NKVD Order No. 00447, as well as preparations for the Moscow Trials and purges within the Red Army. On 7 June 1937, he led a team of senior NKVD officers to Kiev to oversee the arrest of former Ukrainian NKVD chief Vsevolod Balitsky and Red Army officers linked to Iona Yakir. On 17 February 1938, he supervised the assassination of NKVD Foreign Department head Abram Slutsky, who was poisoned in Frinovsky's office. On 28 April 1938, he signed the warrant for the second arrest of poet Osip Mandelstam.

In June 1938, Frinovsky traveled by special train to Khabarovsk in the Russian Far East to direct mass purges of regional security and military personnel, resulting in the execution of 16 senior NKVD officials and the arrest of Far Eastern Army commander Marshal Vasily Blyukher. While he was in the Far East, Stalin appointed Lavrentiy Beria to replace Frinovsky as First Deputy Commissar on 22 August 1938. Returning to Moscow on 25 August, Frinovsky briefly oversaw the execution of several former NKVD officers, including Leonid Zakovsky, before relinquishing his post.

== Downfall and execution ==
On 8 September 1938, Frinovsky was appointed People's Commissar for the Navy. Although he attended a Kremlin reception marking the 21st anniversary of the October Revolution in November 1938 alongside Stalin and Beria, he was not elected to the Central Committee at the 18th Party Congress in March 1939. On 16 March 1939, he wrote to Stalin asking to be relieved of his duties on the grounds that he lacked naval expertise.

On 6 April 1939, Frinovsky was dismissed from all posts and arrested on fabricated charges of organizing a "Trotskyist–Fascist conspiracy" within the NKVD, and was held at Sukhanovo Prison. His wife Nina and 17-year-old son Oleg were arrested on 12 April 1939. All three were included on a list of 346 individuals submitted by Beria to Stalin on 16 January 1940 for execution.

On 4 February 1940, the Military Collegium of the Supreme Court of the Soviet Union sentenced Frinovsky to death; he was executed by firing squad the same day and his body was cremated at the Donskoye Cemetery. By a decree of the Presidium of the Supreme Soviet on 24 January 1941, he was posthumously stripped of all state awards and military rank. Unlike his wife and son, Frinovsky was never politically rehabilitated.

== Awards ==
- Order of Lenin (14 February 1936)
- Three Orders of the Red Banner (1924; 20 December 1932; 3 February 1935)
- Order of the Red Star (22 July 1937)
- Jubilee Medal "XX Years of the Workers' and Peasants' Red Army" (22 February 1938)
- Order of the Red Banner (Mongolia) (25 October 1937)
- Order of the Red Banner of Labour of the Azerbaijan SSR (4 March 1931)
- Order of the Red Banner of Labour of the Transcaucasian SFSR (7 March 1932)
- Badge "Honorary Worker of the VChK–GPU (V)" (1925) and "(XV)" (26 May 1933)
- (All awards and military ranks were revoked posthumously by decree on 24 January 1941.)*

== Family ==
- Brother: Georgy Petrovich Frinovsky (1908–1942), Major of State Security; served as chief of staff and, from October 1937, commander of the 225th Escort Regiment, overseeing prisoner convoys to execution sites at the Solovki prison camp. Killed during World War II.
- Wife: Nina Stepanovna Frinovskaya (1903, Ryazan – 3 February 1940), a postgraduate student at the Institute of History of the Academy of Sciences of the Soviet Union. Arrested on 12 April 1939, sentenced to death on 2 February 1940 for alleged "concealment of counter-revolutionary activities," and executed on 3 February 1940. Posthumously rehabilitated by the Plenum of the Supreme Court of the USSR on 12 January 1966.
- Son: Oleg Mikhailovich Frinovsky (1922, Kharkov – 21 January 1940, Moscow), a 10th-grade student at the 2nd Moscow Special Artillery School. Arrested on 12 April 1939, sentenced to death on 21 January 1940 for alleged participation in a "counter-revolutionary youth group," and executed the same day. Posthumously rehabilitated on 12 January 1966.

In Moscow, Frinovsky resided in a nine-room apartment on Kropotkinskaya Street (now Prechistenka Street, Building 31, Apt. 77), which after his arrest was allocated to senior NKVD officer Veniamin Gulst.

== See also ==
- Commanders of the border troops USSR and RF

Military offices
| Preceded by Pyotr Alexandrovich Smirnov | Commander-in-Chief of the Soviet Navy; 1938–1939 | Succeeded by Nikolai Gerasimovich Kuznetsov |
| Preceded by Pyotr Alexandrovich Smirnov | People's Commissar for the Navy; 1938–1939 | Succeeded by Nikolai Gerasimovich Kuznetsov |
