= Medvedki, Arkhangelsk Oblast =

Medvedki Медведки
- Village
- Location within Arkhangelsk Oblast Location within Russia
- Coordinates: 61°09′N 46°23′E
- Country: Russia
- Region: Arkhangelsk Oblast
- District: Kotlassky District
- Time zone: UTC+3:00

Medvedki (Russian: Медведки) is a rural locality (a village) in Cheryomushskoye Rural Settlement of Kotlassky District, Arkhangelsk Oblast, Russia. The population was 2 as of 2010. There are 6 streets.

== Geography ==
Medvedki is located on the Ukhtomka River, 25 km south of Kotlas (the district's administrative centre) by road. Pustosh is the nearest rural locality.
