= Konstantin Mekhonoshin =

- Константин Мехоношин
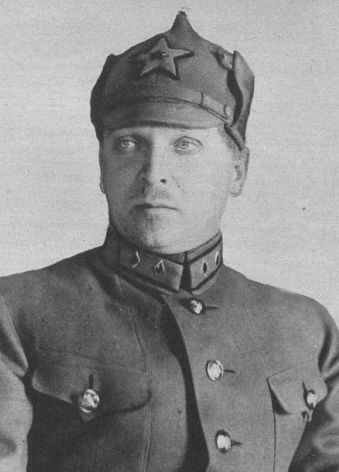

First Deputy People's Commissar of Military Affairs

Personal details
- Born: Konstantin Aleksandrovich Mekhonoshin; 30 October 1889 Zavod-Aleksandrovskii (Aleksandrovsk), Perm Oblast, Russian Empire
- Died: 7 May 1938 (aged 48) Kommunarka shooting ground, Soviet Union
- Party: Russian Social Democratic Labour Party (Bolsheviks); Russian Communist Party (b)
- Education: St Petersburg University

Military service
- Commands: Chairman of the RVS of the Caspian-Caucasian Front
- Battles/wars: First World War; Russian Civil War; Polish-Soviet War

Konstantin Aleksandrovich Mekhonoshin (Russian: Константин Александрович Мехоношин; 11 November [O.S. 30 October] 1889 – 7 May, 1938) was a Russian Bolshevik revolutionary, Soviet military figure and politician.

== Life and career ==
He was born in the settlement of Zavod-Aleksandrovskii (now the city of Aleksandrovsk, Perm Oblast). His parents were teachers in Alexandrovsk at a factory school there. In 1909, he moved to St Petersburg for his studies, where he attended the St Petersburg University. He was involved with revolutionary activities, which resulted in him being arrested twice and expelled from the city, disrupting his studies to the point of being unable to finish them. He became a member of the Russian Social Democratic Labour Party (RSDLP) in 1913.

After the period at University, he was part of a scientific expedition sent by the Russian Academy of Sciences to the Caspian from 1914 to 1915. He was then enrolled into the Russian army with the reserve battalion of the Pavlovsk Life Guard Regiment in 1915 as a private.

Mekhonoshin was an early prominent Russian Bolshevik Party activist. Following the February Revolution, he became a member of the Petrograd Soviet representing the RSDLP, as well as a member of the Bolshevik Petrograd Committee. He was a leading member of the Military Organization of the RSDLP starting in April 1917. Due to his involvement with the party, he was arrested by the Russian Provisional Government in the aftermath of the July Days and was charged with treason. He was held at Kresty Prison pending his trial. He was never brought to trial, and he was released in October 1917.

He became a member (and later the Chief of Staff) of the Petrograd Military Revolutionary Committee (PMRC) upon his release. The PMRC held its first meeting on 20 October 1917, and its headquarters was in the offices of the Petrograd council of trade unions. The PMRC was a mixture of political backgrounds: of the 66 original members, 48 were Bolsheviks, fourteen were Left Socialist-Revolutionaries and four were Anarchists. The principal figures of the PMRC were Leon Trotsky and Mikhail Lashevich; the leaders of the Bolshevik military organization were Mekhonoshin, Nevskii, Iurenev, Nikolai Podvoiskii and Pavel Lazimir. Mekhonoshin played an active role in the October Revolution in 1917. He helped defend Petrograd against the counter-attack led by Alexander Kerensky, the leader of the Russian Provisional Government, with General Krasnov's Cossacks.

He continued with senior positions and roles during the Russian Civil War, including Deputy People's Commissar for Military Affairs, Member of the Collegium of the People's Commissariat for Military and Naval Affairs, member of the All-Russian Collegium for the Organization of the Red Army and Deputy Chairman of the Supreme Military Council. He was appointed commissar on the southern front during the Russian Civil War in 1918 by Leon Trotsky in an attempt to counter Joseph Stalin's military shortcomings. Later, he was part of the 11th Army (RSFSR) Council of War overseeing the military decisions made by the 11th Army in 1921.

After the Russian civil war, he held a number of posts within the Russian Government. He was involved with the Vsevobuch program, a system of compulsory military training for men. He briefly worked as a Soviet military attache in Poland from 1926 to 1927. He also worked for a period at Gosplan, where he was chief of Gosplan's Defence Sector. He was proponent at the time of the defence sector manufacturing being undertaken by civilian factories, as they were believed to be more efficient and would allow the freeing up of resources to use for other state objectives. While at Gosplan, he was also Chairman of a special commission to review the NKVM's 1929/1930 financial five-year plan as part of a bureaucratic tug-of-war between departments.

He was first a military representative and then Chairman of the Supreme Council of Physical Culture from 1921 to 1926. In 1924, while chairman, he appointed Vasily Russo to promote checkers and chess throughout the Soviet Union. This association with Mekhonoshin later proved problematic for Russo, as he was seen as Mekhonoshin's protégé and was later sentenced to 5 years in the labor camps from 1927 to 1931.

As of 1936, Mekhonoshin was Director of the Soviet Institute of Oceanography and Vice Chief of Naval Intelligence. The Soviet Institute of Oceanography handled the scientific and economic side of the Soviet fish industry.

== Arrest and death ==
Konstantin Aleksandrovich Mekhonoshin was arrested in November 1937 and executed at the Kommunarka shooting ground as a result of the purges. He was posthumously rehabilitated by the Soviet government.
