= Football Federation of the Soviet Union =

Former sports governing body organizing association football in the Soviet Union

UEFA
- Founded: 27 December 1934
- Folded: 25 December 1991
- Headquarters: Moscow, Russian SFSR
- FIFA affiliation: 1946–1991
- UEFA affiliation: 1954 (since 1992 as the Russian Football Union)
- President: (see chairmen list below)

The Football Federation of the Soviet Union (Russian: Федерация футбола СССР) was a governing body of football in the Soviet Union and since 1972 the main governing body of football in the country. The Federation was created in late 1934 by the decision of the Supreme Council of Physical Culture of the Soviet Union (Russian: Высший Совет Физической Культуры, VSFK) as its sports section governing specifically football. It was the only organization that obtained recognition of FIFA in 1946.

== History ==
After the establishment of the Soviet regime in the former Russian Empire all its former affiliations abroad were discontinued. Football life in the country however did not stop. In July 1920, the first championship of the Russian SFSR took place, won by the collective city team of Moscow. The general government and organization of sports in Soviet Union was intended to be conducted by the All-Union Council of Physical Culture (VSFK) that was formed in 1920. In September 1923, the first championship of the Soviet Union took place which was won also by the Moscow team over a Petrograd team. With appointed of Nikolai Semashko as chairman of VSFK, a conflict ensued between him and the chairman of Red Sportintern Nikolay Podvoisky. Later this argument joined couple of other groups among which were Komsomol that was in opposition to Podvoisky since 1922 (at times of Vsevobuch) and various trade unions.

In August 1928, the first Spartakiad took place in Moscow (not to be confused with the Spartakiad of the Peoples of the USSR) which included a football tournament.

On 27 May 1934, the "Distinguished Master of Sports" achievement award was established, and given to eight footballers that same year.

On 27 December 1934, the All-Union Council of Physical Culture (VSFK) of the Central Executive Committee of the Soviet Union (TsIK USSR) established a special public organization – the Football Section of the Soviet Union – to take charge of football events in the country. In addition, there was also the Football Directorate of the Soviet Sports Committee, subordinated directly to the Soviet government.

=== First memorable exhibition games ===
On 30 August 1935, the Ukrainian SSR national team beat Red Star Olympique (from France) 6:1. Goals were scored by Shylovsky (3), Parovyshnikov (2), Shchehodsky. Team squad of UkrSSR (2-3-5):

1. Trusevych
2. K. Fomin (captain)
3. Kirillov
4. M. Fomin
5. V. Fomin
6. Hreber
7. Makhynia
8. Parovyshnikov
9. Shchehodsky
10. Laiko
11. Shylovsky

Next month a collective team of Prague visited the Soviet Union playing against team of Leningrad, Moscow, and UkrSSR. In January 1936 the Moscow team consisting of players from Dynamo Moscow and Spartak Moscow visited Racing Paris to which they lost 1:2. A single goal for the Soviets was scored by Yakushyn. Team squad of Moscow (2-3-5):

1. Akimov
2. Al. Starostin (captain)
3. Korchebokov
4. Ryomin
5. And. Starostin
6. Leuta
7. Lapshyn (Stepanov, 46)
8. Yakushyn
9. Smirnov
10. Pavlov (Velichkin, 86)
11. Ilyin

all coached by Konstantin Kvashnin and Nikolai Starostin.

=== Later history ===
In 1936, the Section of Football of the Soviet Union established the Soviet Top League as a championship among teams of Volunteer Sports Sovcieties (DSO) and agencies introducing four hierarchal groups (leagues) of eight teams.

On 22 July 1937, for the first time TsIK USSR given awards to 38 best Soviet sportsmen among which were 12 football players. The first recipient of Order of Lenin among football players became Nikolai Starostin. The Order of the Red Banner of Labour received Alexander Starostin and Sergei Ilyin, other nine players received Order of the Badge of Honor.

During parts of World War II (1941–1944), the main football events were suspended, but there were several regional competitions. When the Soviet Union was liberated from the occupation of Nazi Germany in August 1944, the next national cup competition took place as the first official post-war football event.

In July 1946, the Football Section of the Soviet Union was admitted to FIFA on the proposition of delegates from Soviet satellite states of Yugoslavia and Czechoslovakia, and on 27 September 1947 the USSR was awarded a permanent seat of the vice-president of FIFA which was taken by Valentin Granatkin. The main national football team of the Soviet Union, however, did not enter the FIFA World Cup until 1958. The first coach appointed was Boris Arkadiev who in 1952 led the team to the Olympic Games in Helsinki. Later, he and several other football specialists were accused by Joseph Stalin of sabotaging the team that was eliminated in the tournament's round of 16.

In January 1957, the Presidium of the Supreme Soviet of the USSR awarded the Order of Lenin to Vsevolod Bobrov and Lev Yashin to commemorate their achievements in sport.

In May 1959, the Football Section of the Soviet Union was reorganized as the Football Federation of the Soviet Union.

In 1960, the Soviet Union national team won the first continental championship beating the Yugoslavia national team 2–1 in extra time.

In 1963, Lev Yashin became the first Soviet player to be awarded the Ballon d'Or.

For the first time in the 1965–66 season, Soviet football clubs debuted in the European international football competitions.

In 1972, the Football Federation of the Soviet Union became a government agency of the State Committee of Sports (Goskomsport). However, because Granatkin continued to chair the Football Federation, that reorganization did not draw much attention from FIFA.

Dynamo Kiev became the first Soviet club to win a European club trophy, when they defeated Ferencvaros 3–0 in the 1975 European Cup Winners' Cup final.

On 8 February 1992, the federation was recognized as the parent association of the newly established Russian Football Union (RFS). In July of the same year, the executive committee of FIFA confirmed the succession of the Soviet federation as the Russian Football Union and readmitted it under the new name and statute.

== Regional Federations ==
- Football Federation of the Ukrainian SSR (1959?), succeeded by the Football Federation of Ukraine in December 1991
- Football Federation of the Byelorussian SSR, succeeded by the Football Federation of Belarus in 1989
- Football Federation of the Kazakh SSR (1959), succeeded by the Football Federation of Kazakhstan in 1989
- Football Federation of the Georgian SSR (1936), succeeded by the Georgian Football Federation in February 1990
- Football Federation of the Uzbek SSR (1946), succeeded by the Uzbekistan Football Federation
- Football Federation of the Tajik SSR (1936), succeeded by the Tajikistan Football Federation

== Chairmen ==
- Vyacheslav Koloskov (January 1990 – 1991)
- Lev Lebedev (May 1989 – January 1990)
- Boris Topornin (December 1980 – May 1989)
- Boris Fedosov (March 1973 – December 1980)
- Valentin Granatkin (June 1968 – March 1973)
- Leonid Nikonov (January 1968 – June 1968)
- Vladimir Moshkarkin (July 1967 – January 1968)
- Nikolai Riashentsev (January 1964 – July 1967)
- Valentin Granatkin (6 May 1959 – January 1964)

=== Chairmen of Football Section of the Soviet Union (27 December 1934 – 6 May 1959) ===
- Valentin Granatkin (1950 – 6 May 1959)
- Mikhail Kozlov (1937 – 1950)
- Aleksei Sokolov (27 December 1934 – 1937)

== The first team coaches ==
- Boris Arkadyev 1952 Olympics (qualifying and final tournaments)
- Gavriil Kachalin 1956 Olympics (qualifying and final tournaments), 1958 World Cup (qualifying and final tournaments), 1960 Olympics (qualifying tournament, failed to qualify), 1960 European Championship (qualifying and final tournaments), 1962 World Cup (qualifying and final tournaments)
- Nikita Simonyan (acting)
- Konstantin Beskov 1964 Olympics (qualifying tournament, failed to qualify), 1964 European championship (qualifying and final tournaments)
- Nikolai Morozov 1966 World Cup (qualifying and final tournaments)
- Mikhail Yakushin 1968 Olympics (qualifying tournament, failed to qualify), 1968 European championship (qualifying and final tournaments)
- Gavriil Kachalin 1970 World Cup (qualifying and final tournaments)
- Valentin Nikolayev 1972 European championship (qualifying tournament)
- Aleksandr Ponomarev 1972 European championship (final tournament), 1972 Olympics (final tournament)
- Yevgeny Goryansky 1974 World Cup (qualifying tournament, failed to qualify)
- Konstantin Beskov (replaced by Valeriy Lobanovsky) 1976 European championship (qualifying tournament, failed to qualify), 1976 Olympics (final tournament)
- Nikita Simonyan (replaced by Konstantin Beskov) 1978 World Cup (qualifying tournament, failed to qualify), 1980 European Championship (qualifying tournament, failed to qualify)
- Konstantin Beskov 1982 World Cup (qualifying and final tournaments)
- Valeriy Lobanovsky 1984 European championship (qualifying tournament, failed to qualify)
- Eduard Malofeyev 1986 World Cup (qualifying tournament)
- Valeriy Lobanovsky 1986 World Cup (final tournament), 1988 European championship (qualifying and final tournaments), 1990 World Cup (qualifying and final tournaments)
- Anatoliy Byshovets 1992 European championship (qualifying and final tournaments)

== Logos ==
First logo used

Second logo used

Third logo used, used until the fall of the Soviet Union

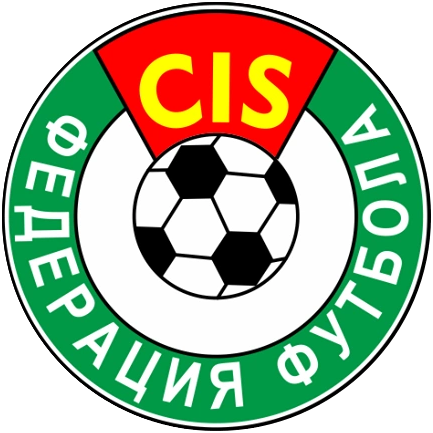
Logo used in 1992.

== See also ==
- Football Directorate
