= Military Revolutionary Committee =

1917–1918 Bolshevik organizations

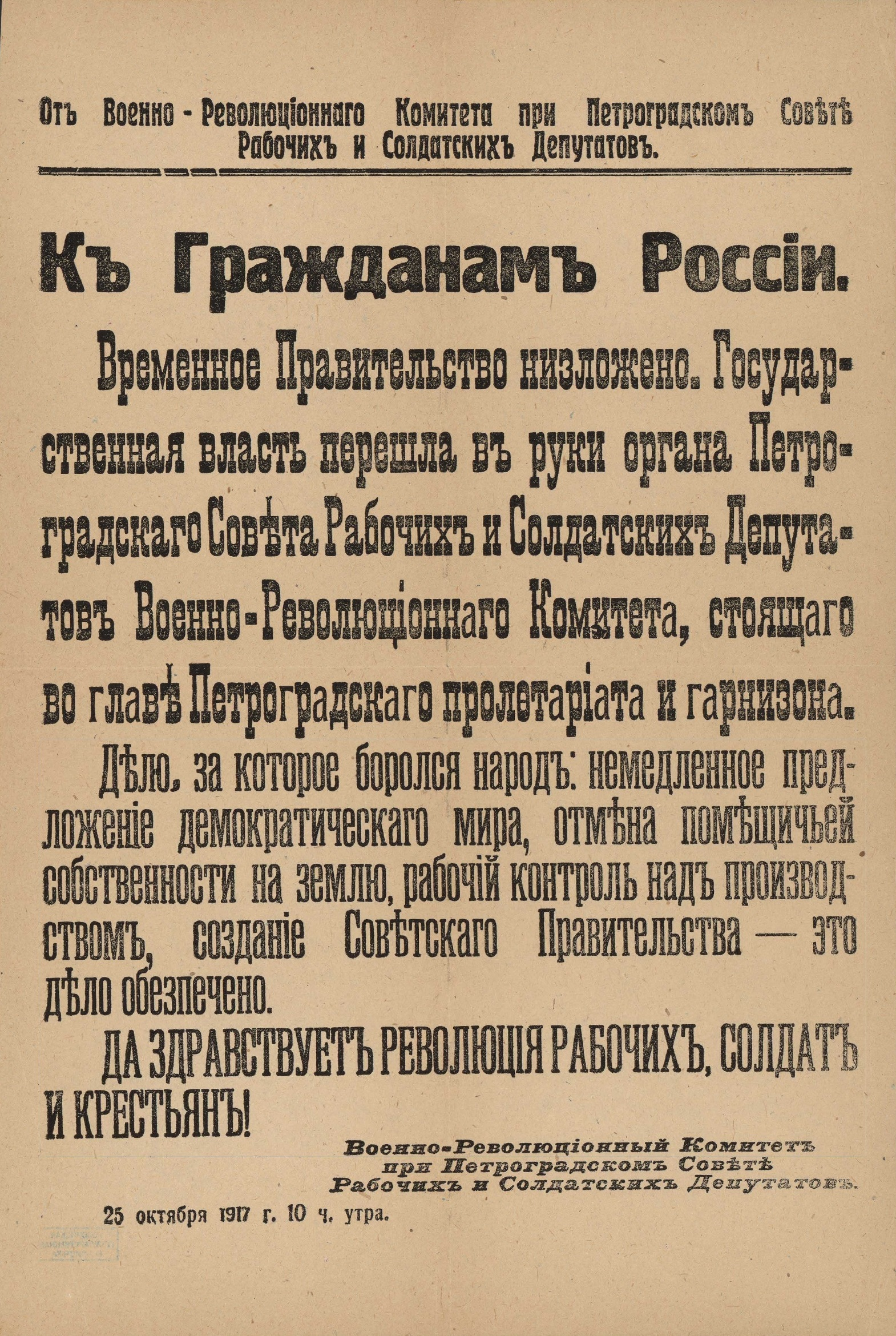
Facsimile of the Petrograd Military Revolutionary Committee proclamation of the overthrow of the Russian Provisional Government

The Military Revolutionary Committee (Milrevcom; Russian: Военно-революционный комитет, Voyenno-revolyutsionny komitet) was the name for military organs created by the Bolsheviks under the soviets in preparation for the October Revolution (October 1917 – March 1918). The committees were powerful directing bodies of revolt, installing and securing the Soviet power. They executed a role of provisional extraordinary organs the Bolshevik power.

The most notable ones were those of the Petrograd Soviet, the Moscow Soviet, and at Stavka. The Petrograd Military Revolutionary Committee was created on 29 October [O.S. 16 October] 1917.

== Creation ==
The idea for organization of the armed revolt battle center belongs to Vladimir Lenin. In his letter "Marxism and Revolt" directed to the Central Committee of RSDLP (b) in September 1917, he put on the agenda the task of preparing an armed uprising, writing:

And to treat the revolt in a Marxist way, that is, as an art, we at the same time, without losing a moment, must organize headquarters of the insurgent groups ...

The decision of Central Committee of RSDLP(b) of October 23 and 29, 1917 on enhanced preparation for the armed revolt hastened the creation of uprising bodies at central and local levels. The MRC were elected from representatives of the Bolsheviks' party, soviets, factory or soldier committees, Bolshevik Military Organizations (Voyenka), Red Guards, and others. The committees were of various levels such as gubernial, city, county, district, volost; while in the Army were frontlines, army, corps, division, and regimental. On occasions the functions of the Military Revolutionary Committee were performed by revolutionary committees. The military revolutionary committees were not uniform in terms of their social and party composition, however most of them were predominantly represented by Bolsheviks.

The first headquarters of armed uprising became the Petrograd Military Revolutionary Committee, that was created by the Petrograd Soviet on October 25, 1917. Prior to a victorious moment of the uprising in Petrograd there were over 40 Military Revolutionary Committees in the country, the main activity of which was military and technical preparations for the forthcoming revolt.

== List ==
During the "Triumphant advance of Soviet power" there was a mass establishment of MRCs. Many MRCs appeared on initiative of the arrived delegates of the 2nd All-Russian Congress of Soviets. Big squad of commissars, emissaries, agitators was sent to various country's regions by the Petrograd MRC on direction of the Central Committee of RSDLP(b). The Bolshevik's party composed the committees of experienced organizers.

Creation date	Name	Head (composition)	Notes
October 29	Petrograd MRC	Pavel Lazimir, Leon Trotsky, Nikolai Podvoisky, Vladimir Antonov-Ovseenko, Mikhail Lashevich, A. D. Sadovsky, Konstantin Mekhonoshin	
October 31	12th Army MRC	Jānis Čarin (Karl Gailis, Jānis Krūmiņš-Pilāts)	Until November 8, 1917, existed illegally in Cēsis
November 4	Estonia MRC	Ivan Rabchinsky (Jaan Anvelt, Viktor Kingissepp)	
November 4	Pskov MRC	Vasili Panyushkin	Name changed to Northern Front (from November 8, 1917)
November 7	Moscow MRC	Georgy Oppokov (Grigory Usievich, Nikolay Muralov, Jānis Pieče, Aleksandr Arosev, Vladimir Smirnov)	
November 7	Voronezh revkom	Alexey Sergeevich Moiseyev	
November 8	Ryazan MRC	Arkady Syromyatnikov	
November 9	Minsk MRC	Aleksandr Myasnikyan (Moisei Kalmanovich, Vilhelms Knoriņš, Kārlis Landers)	Renamed to Western Front and Northwestern Region
November 9	Samara MRC	Valerian Kuybyshev	
November 9	Tula revkom	Grigory Kaminsky	
November 10	Tomsk MRC	Aleksei Belenets	
November 11	Kiev MRC	Leonid Pyatakov (Andriy Ivanov, Volodymyr Zatonsky, Mykhailo Bohdanov, Oleksandr Horvits)	Recreated as Kiev revkom on January 28, 1918
November 11	Smolensk revkom	Semyon Ioffe	
November 21	Dagestan MRC	Ullubi Buinaksky	
November 27	Orenburg MRC	Samuil Tsvilling	
December 1	Southwestern Front MRC	Grigory Razzhivin (Vasili Kikvidze)	
December 15	Romanian Front MRC	Pyotr Baranov (Aleksandr Krusser, Vladimir Yudovsky)	
December 20	Barnaul MRC	Matvei Tsaplin	
December 23	Kharkov MRC	Comrade Artyom (Valery Mezhlauk, Moisey Rukhimovich)	
December 23	Yekaterinburg MRC	Nikolay Krestinsky	
December 23	Vinnitsa MRC	Nikolai Tarnogrodsky	
December 23	Odessa MRC	Vladimir Yudovsky	
December 23	Simferopol MRC	Jānis Miller	
December 29	Sevastopol revkom	Yuri Gaven	
January	Astrakhan revkom	Mina Aristov	
January	Shuya MRC	Mikhail Frunze	
January 10	Caucasus Army MRC	Grigory Korganov (Boris Sheboldayev)	
January 23	Don MRC	Fyodor Podtyolkov (Mikhail Krivoshlykov)	
January 30	Kuban - Black Sea MRC	Yan Poluyan	
March 2	Semirechye MRC	Pavel Vinogradov	

== Influence ==
In the weeks following the October insurrection, military revolutionary committees based on the MRC of Petrograd were set up throughout the other soviets and helped cement Bolshevik control. These other MRCs were formed by locals but agents from the Petrograd MRC were often in positions to give advice or direction. By the end of October 1917, representatives from the Petrograd MRC were on assignments in at least forty-four cities as well as 113 military units throughout Russia, Turkestan, and the Caucasus.

== See also ==
- Revolutionary Military Council
