= Football Directorate =

The Football Directorate (Russian: Управление футбола, Upravlenie futbola) was an agency of the State Sports Committee of the Soviet Union in charge of the association football in the country. Internationally for the communication with the "western" organizations (FIFA, UEFA) there existed the Football Federation of the Soviet Union, however the actual administration and organization of any football-related events was carried out by the Football Directorate of the Soviet Sports Committee.

From its establishing in 1934 and until 1972 it shared its governing functions with the Football Federation of the Soviet Union (Football Section). Starting from 1972 and until 1990 it was the sole governing body of the sport. In 1972 FIFA chose to ignore that the Soviet government took over administration of football in the country.

== Chairmen ==
- 1937 – 1941 Aleksandr Starostin (jailed as the enemy of the people)
- 1956 – 1958 Aleksandr Starostin
- 1972 – 1979 Valentin Granatkin
- 1979 – 1991 Vyacheslav Koloskov

== See also ==
- Football Federation of the Soviet Union
- All-Union Council on Physical Culture and Sports
