= Voluntary Sports Societies of the Soviet Union =

Soviet sports clubs

The Voluntary Sports Societies (VSS) of the USSR (Russian: Добровольные спортивные общества (ДСО) СССР, Dobrobolvolnye Sportivye Obshestva SSSR (DSO SSSR)) were the main structural parts of the universal sports and physical education (fitness) system, that existed in the USSR between 1935 and 1991.

The Departmental Sports Societies (DSS) of the USSR (DSS-USSR) (Russian: Ведомственное спортивное общество (BCO) CCCP, Vedomstvennoye Sportivnoye Obshchestvo SSSR (VSO SSSR)) were only very few:

- Dinamo
- Voluntary society in support of Army, Aviation, and Fleet (DOSAAF)
- Armed Forces sports societies (CSKA, SKA, VO, DKA, DO, others).

A special sports society was "Spartak" that was controlled by the Communist Party of the Soviet Union through its youth wing Komsomol. The Spartak sports society was mimicking a voluntary sports society claiming its heritage from the trade unions of either "industrial cooperation" or food suppliers. Following the Soviet Union expansion and occupation of neighboring territories Spartak was one of the sports societies that were established instantaneously along with Dynamo.

The VSS united sporting people, offering hiking, mountaineering, boating, and various other sports. Their goals were to develop mass physical culture and sports and to provide facilities and conditions for sports training and improvement in athletes' skills. Most of the VSS were governed by trade Unions and often were closely associated with a certain ministry (aircraft industry, food workers, tractor industry, KGB, Red Army, Soviet Air Force), with industries being state-funded. Twenty five million athletes were members of such societies in 1970.

One of the most important features of VSS were Children and Youth Sport Schools (Russian: Детско-юношеские спортивные школы, ДЮСШ), which numbered 1,350 in the 1970s and 7,500 in 1987. Later some of them were reformed into more elite Olympic reserve schools. There were also specialized sport clubs, groups of improvement athletes' skills, etc. More than 50,000 trainers and instructors worked there in these institutions.

== History ==
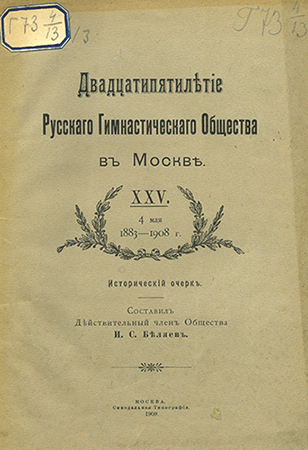
The 25th Anniversary of the Russian Gymnastics Society, 1908

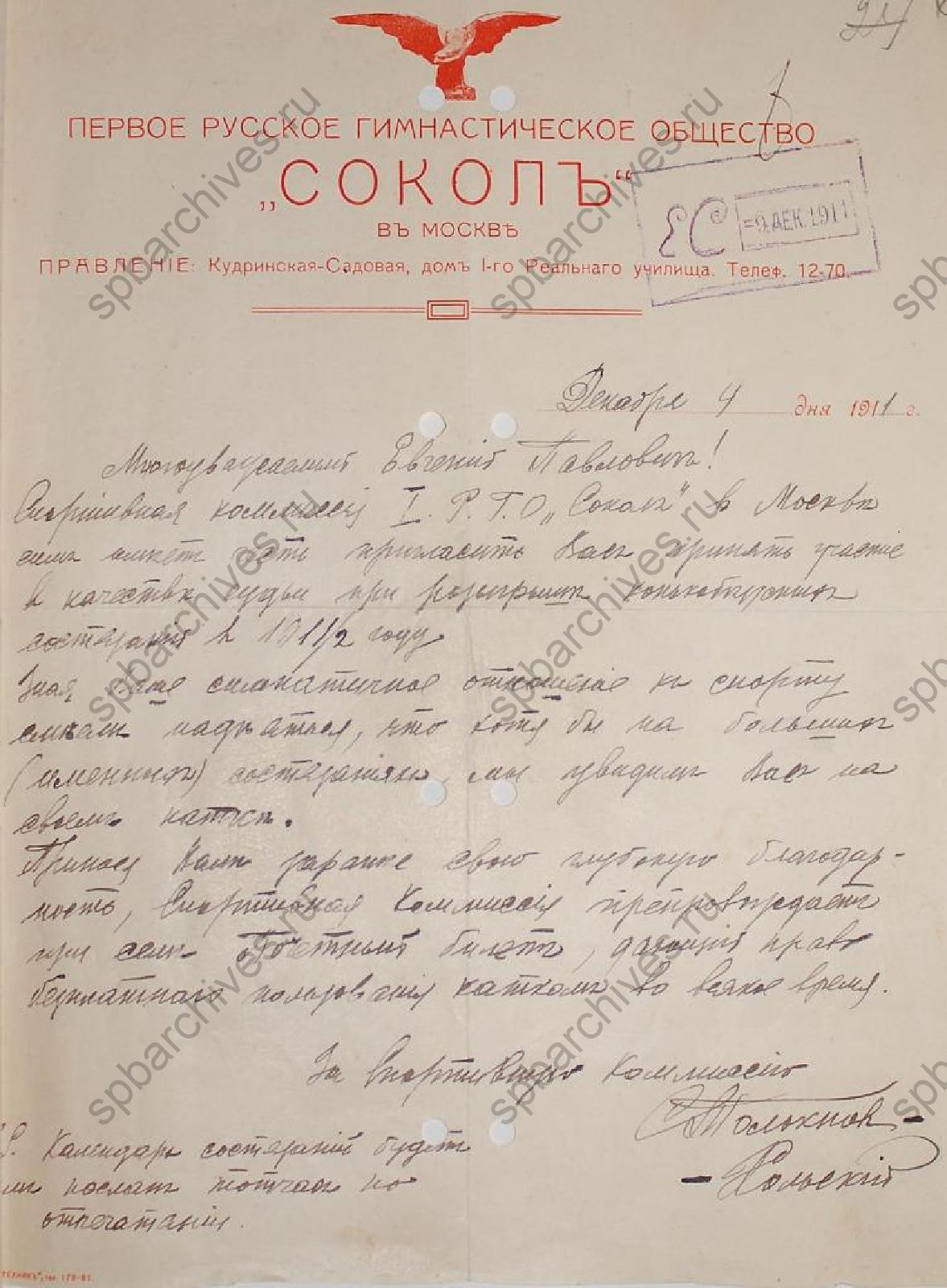
The First Russian Gymnastics Society "Sokol"

=== Background ===
Already in the first half of 19th century sports schools, clubs, societies (sailing and rowing, fencing, swimming, ice skating, cycling, and others) appeared in Saint-Petersburg, Moscow, Kiev and other cities of the Russian Empire. The yacht clubs of Moscow and Saint-Petersburg figured among the first such societies. Along with the development of the sport societies, official sports competitions started. The Great Soviet Encyclopedia states that usually those sports clubs and unions were chartered and financed by representatives of the bourgeoisie and of the nobility, and that access to them for students and working youth "was extremely limited". At the end of the 19th and start of the 20th centuries there appeared workers' sports organizations across the cities of the Russian Empire. Prominent roles in the development of the Russian sport were played by the "Petersburg's Circle of Sports Enthusiasts" (established in 1889), the "Russian Gymnastics Society" also known as RGO Sokol (1883, Moscow), the "Petersburg Society of Skating Enthusiasts" (1877), the "Circle of Athletic Enthusiasts" (1885, Petersburg), and others.

In 1896 the founder of a scientific system of fitness education, Pyotr Lesgaft (1837–1909), opened in Petersburg the courses of educators and leaders of physical education that eventually became a prototype of the higher-learning institutions in physical education established in the Soviet Union and abroad. In the beginning of the 20th century All-Russian unions on sports emerged and organized the first championships. In 1913 the First Russian Sporting Olympiad took place in Kiev where some 600 people - including females - participated. The Second Russian Sporting Olympiad followed the next year (1914) in Riga involving over 1,000 participants. The program of those Olympics consisted of light athletics, gymnastics, fencing, association football, tennis, heavy athletics, swimming, rowing, sailing, modern pentathlon, shooting, equestrian, and cycling.

In 1907 on decree of the Imperial Russian Prime Minister Pyotr Stolypin, the Russian Gymnastics Society was officially renamed as RGO Sokol and joined the Pan-Slavic Sokol movement (Sokolskoe dvizhennie). By 1910 it accounted for 60 cities in the Russian Empire that had their Sokol gymnastics societies.

The Russian Empire figured among the 12 countries, representatives of which, at the first international Olympic Congress in Paris in 1894, decided to revive the Olympics and established the International Olympic Committee. Sportsmen of the Russian Empire participated in the 1908 Olympics (5 members) and in the 1912 Olympics (174 members). In 1914 the Russian Empire had 1,200 sports unions involving some 45,000 participants out of some 332 cities and other settlements.

=== Soviet sport ===
After the October Revolution of late 1917 state oversight of the workers' physical training was assigned to the Main Department of Vsevobuch (Universal Military Training) in 1918, following this Supreme Council of Fitness Culture (VSFK) (Russian: Высший совет физической культуры) was established in 1920. In 1923 such VSFKs were set up for every Executive Committee of each Soviet region. In 1936 the council was reformed into the All-Union committee for fitness culture and sports affairs under the Council of People's Commissars of the USSR (Russian: Всесоюзный комитет по делам физической культуры и спорта при СНК СССР).

VSS Spartak, the first of the future Union-wide national sports societies, dates from 1935. The society united the workers of local industries, communal economy, culture, automobile transportation, civil aviation, and others. In the following years numerous other sport societies were set up throughout the Soviet Union. Some societies were closely associated with a single industry; others had associations with a combination of several. For example, athletes from factory schools and vocational schools were united into VSS Trudovye Rezervy in 1943. The formation of the kernel of the system was complete in the 1950s, when village VSS were established in all 16 of the then Soviet republics (including the Karelo-Finnish SSR until 1956).

== Structure ==
The main structural units of VSS were physical culture collectives by the enterprises, public-service institutions, collective farms (kolkhoz), state farms (sovkhoz), educational institutions, etc. These collectives were primary organizations of VSS and numbered 114 thousands (including 105 thousands under Trade Unions), united into 36 VSS (29 of them were of Trade Unions) as of 1971. There were six All-Union VSS (Russian: Всесоюзное добровольное спортивное общество, ВДСО) and 30 republican VSS – 15 united physical culture collectives of industrial enterprises and other 15 united rural collectives. Those were the standard societies. In 1982 all republican societies merged under the two Russian republican societies.

The Dynamo Sports Club, founded in 1923 by Felix Dzerzhinsky, represented the security services of the USSR, and were sponsored by them. The society had a special status. Another sports society was the "Sports club of the Armed Forces" (usually abbreviated as SKA - Sports Club of the Army). Like Dynamo, SKA also carried a special status, as they represented the athletes in their military service duty in the Soviet Armed Forces.

Beside those, there were also numerous other sport societies that preceded the above-mentioned or were less represented such as Vympel (River transportation) and Moryak (Sea transportation) combined into Vodnik, Stakhanovets (Mining industry) changed into Shakhter, and others. There even was a society of DOSAAF which was a volunteer society in cooperation with the Army, Air Force, and Navy (notice the combination of the last three letters) and a sister club to the SKA organization.

=== All-Union VSS ===
Name	Foundation	Industry
Burevestnik	1957	Higher Education
Vodnik	1938	Waterways communication
Zenit	1936	Defense Industry (weapons)
Lokomotiv	1936	Railways communication
Spartak	1935	Others
Trudovye Rezervy	1943	Professional Education

=== Republican VSS of industrial enterprises ===
Name/Translit/Meaning	Republic	Foundation
Труд (Trud, Labour)	Russian SFSR	1957
Авангард (Avanhard, Advance Guard)	Ukrainian SSR	1958
Чырвоны сцяг (Сhervony stsyah, Red Banner)	Byelorussian SSR	1958
Мехнат (Mekhnat, Labour)	Uzbek SSR	1958
Енбек (Enbek, Labour)	Kazakh SSR	1958
განთიადი (Gantiadi, Dawn)	Georgian SSR	1958
Нефтчи (Neftçi, Petrolman)	Azerbaijan SSR	1958
Žalgiris (after the Battle of Žalgiris)	Lithuanian SSR	1944
Молдова (Moldova)	Moldavian SSR	1958
Daugava (after the Daugava River)	Latvian SSR	1944
Алга (Alga, Forward)	Kyrgyz SSR	1958
Тоҷикистон (Tajikistan)	Tajik SSR	1958
Աշխատանք (Ashkhatank, Labour)	Armenian SSR	1958
Захмет (Zakhmet, Labour)	Turkmen SSR	1958
Kalev (after Kalev)	Estonian SSR	1944

=== Republican rural VSS ===
Name/Translit/Meaning	Republic	Foundation
Урожай (Urozhai, Harvest)	Russian SFSR	1956
Колос (Kolos, Grain ear)	Ukrainian SSR	1956
Ураджай (Uradzhai, Harvest)	Byelorussian SSR	1956
Пахтакор (Pakhtakor, Cotton farmer)	Uzbek SSR	1956
Қайрат (Kairat, Strength)	Kazakh SSR	1956
კოლმეურნე (Kolmeurne, Kolkhoznik)	Georgian SSR	1956
Мәһсул (Mekhsul, Harvest)	Azerbaijan SSR	1956
Nemunas (Nemunas River)	Lithuanian SSR	1956
Колхозникул (Colhoznicul, The Kolkhoznik)	Moldavian SSR	1956
Vārpa (Grain ear)	Latvian SSR	1956
Колхозчу (Kolkhozchu, Kolkhoznik)	Kyrgyz SSR	1958
Хосилот (Khosilot, Harvest)	Tajik SSR	1956
Սևանա (Sevan, Lake Sevan)	Armenian SSR	1956
Колхозчы (Kolkhozchi, Kolkhoznik)	Turkmen SSR	1956
Jõud (Strength)	Estonian SSR	1946

=== Reorganization in the 1980s ===
In 1982 the Presidium of the VTsSPS reorganized 33 Trade Unions' VSS. None were abolished, just the governing organization of most of them was changed from VTsSPS to another one. The eight largest Trade Unions' VSS remained under VTsSPS leadership: Burevestnik, Vodnik, Zenit, Lokomotiv, Spartak, Trud, Urozhai, FiS (Russian: ФиС - физкультура и спорт; English: fitness and sports). According to the Great Soviet Encyclopaedia, these eight VSS united 48.365 million members. VSS that did not belong to the Trade Unions were not reorganized. Two national societies from athletes from all the Union Republics had already been formed on the basis of the 15 societies in 1982.

In February 1987 all remaining VSS were abolished by the VTsSPS. On the basis of eight Trade Unions' VSS, one All-Union Volunteer Fitness and Sports Society of Trade Unions (Russian: Всесоюзное добровольное физкультурно-спортивное общество профсоюзов, ВДФСО профсоюзов, Vsesoyuznoe Dobrobolvolne Fiykultura-Sportivne Obshestvo Profsoyzhov, VDFSO Profsoyzhov) was created to serve as a unified organization encompassing athletes countrywide, but per its official charter, its charter VSS were granted autonomy as member clubs maintaining the traditions of their predecessors while maintaining VDSFO unified membership cards. Trud and Urozhai societies remained independent of the new organization.

=== Other important VSSs ===
- Torpedo (automobile and truck manufacture industries)
- Traktor (Tractor manufacture industry)
- Strela (Subway workers of the Moscow Metro)
- Neftyanik (Oil industry)
- Energia (energy and power industries)
- Stroitel (building industries)
- Start (transport drivers)
- Khimik (Chemical Industries)
- Metallurg (metals industries)
- Krasnaya Zvezda (Armed Forces)
- Shakhter (Mining industry)
- Krilya Sovietov (Aircraft production factories)
- Samolet (civil aviation)
- Chernomorets (Merchant marine and port workers)
- Sudostroitel (Ship manufacture and construction)
- Pishchevik (Food distribution and tobacco)
- Stalinets (Electrical machines)
- Zapolyarnik
- Tekstilschik (Textiles and clothing production)
- Krasnoe Znamya (Cotton industry)
- Monolit (Painters and paint manufacturers)
- Medik (Medical profession)
- Rekord (State-owned enterprises)
- Iskusstvo (visual and performing arts)

== Governing body and its functions ==
The governing body of Trade Unions' VSS was the All-Union Council of Trade Unions' VSS (Russian: Всесоюзный совет ДСО профсоюзов, Vsesoyuznyi Sovet DSO Profsoyzhov), established and governed by VTsSPS since 1957.

The Council's main activities were:

- to hold competitions between VSS, Spartakiads of Trade Unions, to arrange sports and fitness holidays
- to support the participation of VSS in All-Union and international competitions
- to control functioning of Children and Youth Sport Schools and other institutions
- to lead construction of sports facilities
- to award the best physical culture collectives the title Sport Club
- to maintain relations with foreign workers' and students' sports unions

Reporting under the Council were federations of various sports disciplines, Coach Councils, and Judging Boards which functioned to assist its duties.

The SKA and Dynamo associations, which were composed of athletes in uniformed service in the armed forces and police, and the volunteer DOSAAF organization were under the direct supervision of the Ministries of Defense and Internal Affairs and were thus independent from the unions' sports societies.

== Financing, facilities and symbols ==
VSS were financed mostly by trade unions and state (e.g. 355 million roubles in 1970). There were a lot of sports facilities constructed throughout the country using this means by 1970: 2,490 stadiums, 59,000 football grounds, 14,400 complex sports grounds, 10,200 artistic gymnastics halls, 950 artificial swimming pools, 270,000 grounds for sport games.

Each VSS had its own flag, emblem, sports uniform and pin. Societies, which were awarded orders (e.g. VSS Spartak - Order of Lenin) had their images on the flag and other symbols.

== VSS at the Olympics ==
The most represented VSS at the Olympics usually were Spartak, Burevestnik, Trud, Zenit, Avangard. For example, from 409 competitors for the USSR at the 1976 Summer Olympics 58 were from Spartak, 48 from Burevestnik, 28 from Trud, 13 from Zenit and 11 from Avangard.

== Controversy ==
According to the Olympic rules of the 20th century, only amateur athletes were eligible to participate. Top Soviet athletes were funded by the state and trained full-time but were listed in different VSS what allowed them to retain their amateur status. That created a disbalance in the international sports, and the IOC was prompted to drop outdated amateur rules and open the Olympics to all athletes, regardless of their status.

== See also ==
- Dynamo
- CSKA
- Ready for Labour and Defence of the USSR (GTO)
- Vsevobuch
- Sports club
- Departmental sports in Pakistan
