= Spartak (sports society) =

International fitness and sports society

The emblem of the VSS Spartak

Spartak (Russian: Спартак) is an international fitness and sports society that unites some countries of the former Soviet Union. In the Soviet era, the Spartak sports society was supported by the Komsomol. Since 1991, Spartak has operated under the sponsorship of the food worker's union ("Pischevik").

It was founded in 1921 in Moscow as the "Moscow Sports Circle" (MSK) by footballer Nikolai Starostin and others. In 1926 it came under the sponsorship of the food worker's union ("Pischevik"). In 1934, it adopted the name of Spartak, after the ancient Thracian slave, rebel and athlete Spartacus and became the sports society for all unions. It was dissolved in 1987 and reformed in 1991 as an international society among six nations of the former Soviet Union.

== Overview ==
Spartak was the first and the largest All-Union Voluntary Sports Society of workers of state trade, producers' cooperation, light industry, civil aviation, education, culture, health service etc. Originated in 1925-26 as several physical culture groups by small producers' artels as an all-union physical culture and sports society it was established on April 19, 1935 on the resolution of the Soviet government when its statute was approved by the All-Union Council of Physical Culture.

In 1936 Spartak organized and successfully conducted a sports parade at the Moscow's Red Square.

In 1987 Spartak was abolished and all its assets were transferred back to trade unions. In 1991 the society was reorganized as an international. Currently the society has affiliation in six countries of the former Soviet Union: Russia, Ukraine, Belarus, Kazakhstan, Kyrgyzstan, Azerbaijan. Each society's affiliation is subordinated to their respective country's government, Olympic and trade unions committees, while participating in collective events organized by the Spartak Central Council.

== Presidents ==
- Nikolai Starostin (?-1935)
- Semyon Privis (1935-?)
- Gennadiy Mikhalchuk
- Pyotr Sobolev
- Yevgeniy Arkhipov
- Vladimir Vekshin
- Nikolai Ozerov
- Anna Alyoshina

== Countries-Members ==
Since the revival in 1991.

- Azerbaijan
- Belarus
- Kazakhstan (1996) (website)
- Kyrgyzstan
- Russia (1991)
- Ukraine (1992) (website)

== Notable members (one per sport) ==
- Nellie Kim (artistic gymnastics)
- Vladimir Golubnichy (athletics)
- Aleksandr Belov (basketball)
- Anatoly Alyabyev (biathlon)
- Boris Lagutin (boxing)
- Garry Kasparov (chess)
- Nikolay Zimyatov (cross-country skiing)
- Marina Klimova (figure skating)
- Nikolai Starostin (football)
- Zinaida Turchyna (handball)
- Alexander Yakushev (ice hockey)
- Vitaly Abalakov (mountaineering)
- Klara Guseva (speed skating)
- Elena Dementieva (tennis)
