= People's Commissariat for Military Affairs (Soviet Russia) =

Military government agency of Soviet Russia (8th Nov, 1917 - 2nd Sept, 1918)

- Народный комиссариат по военным делам РСФСР
- All ministry seals of the RSFSR used the RSFSR coat of arms

Agency overview
- Formed: 8 November 1917
- Preceding agencies: Ministry of War of the Russian Empire; Provisional Ministry of War
- Dissolved: 12 November 1923
- Superseding agency: People's Commissariat for Military and Naval Affairs
- Jurisdiction: Russian Soviet Federative Socialist Republic
- Headquarters: Petrograd, (later in Moscow), RSFSR
- Parent agency: Council of People's Commissars; Revolutionary War Council

People's Commissariat for Military Affairs (Russian: Народный комиссариат по военным делам РСФСР, Narodny komissariat po voyennym delam RSFSR) was the very first military government agency (ministry of defense) of Soviet Russia, initially named as the Committee on War and Navy Affairs. The People's Commissariat was created on November 8, 1917 (day after the October Revolution) on the decree of the 2nd All-Russian Congress of Soviets "On creation of the Provisional Workers' and Peasants' Government" which was the name of the Russian Sovnarkom.

The Kornilov Affair sanctioned by Alexander Kerensky which resulted in detention of the Russian Supreme Commander-in-Chief Lavr Kornilov and the Bolshevisation of Soviets also played a major role in establishing of the Soviet military presence. The council gradually overtook the authority of the Ministry of War of the Russian Republic completely changing the defense policy of Russia.

== Historical background ==
On October 27, it was renamed the Council of People's Commissars (Sovnarkom) for Military and Naval Affairs. On this basis, on November 23, 1917, the People's Commissariat for Military Affairs was established, headed by a Board entrusted with the functions of managing the apparatus of the former War Ministry.

On October 26, 1917, the Second All-Russian Congress of Soviets issued a decree "On the Establishment of the Council of People's Commissars" establishing the Committee on Military and Naval Affairs. The committee was headed by a collegiate of the Petrograd Military Revolutionary Committee (Petrograd VRK) "Field Headquarters" (triumvirate) consisting of Vladimir Antonov-Ovseenko, Pavel Dybenko and Nikolai Krylenko. Ovseenko oversaw the ministry which succeeded the Ministry of War of the Russian Empire and internal front, Dybenko headed the Navy ministry, while Krylenko was put in charge of foreign front. However, on the next day the leadership was increased to 10 members, due to organizational complications. The same day (November 9, 1917) Vladimir Antonov-Ovseenko was placed in charge of the Petrograd Military District replacing at that post Mikhail Artemyevich Muravyov. Together with Muravyov, Antonov was placed in charge of an expeditionary force to the Southern Russia, while the acting Supreme Commander-in-Chief was General Nikolay Dukhonin.

On November 15–16, 1917 new changes took place. The committee changed its name to the Council of People's Commissars on War and Navy Affairs (Russian: Совет Народных Комиссаров по Военным и Морским Делам). Originally it consisted of the college of war minister and a leader of revolutionary forces, while later a position of the Supreme Commander-in-Chief was created and by the end of November the Supreme Navy College was added to the council. On November 22, 1917 the Soviet government appointed its own Supreme Commander-in-Chief and overran the Main Headquarters of Supreme Commander-in-Chief (Stavka) in Mogilev when the acting Supreme Commander-in-Chief General Nikolay Dukhonin was killed by enraged soldiers. On November 23, 1917, the agency named changed to People's Commissariat for Military Affairs was established The Military People's Commissariat was practically finalized and fully functional on December 10, 1917. Following the establishment of the Revolutionary Military Council of the Republic in September 1918, this body exercised overall leadership of the armed forces. Leon Trotsky served as its chairman and simultaneously as People's Commissar for Military Affairs. In February 1918 naval affairs were taken out of the commissariat's scope with the creation of the People's Commissariat for Navy Affairs.

- College of War Minister - Nikolai Podvoisky
- Commander-in-Chief of revolutionary forces against - Vladimir Antonov-Ovseyenko
- Supreme Commander-in-Chief of Army and Fleet of the Russian Republic (November 22) - Nikolai Krylenko
- Supreme Navy College (formed on November 27) - Pavel Dybenko

== Military revolutionary committees and Voyenka ==
Key role in establishing the Soviet military presence played military revolutionary committees (VRK) and the Communist Party military organization. The Soviet military majorly was based on its own military organizations of the RSDLP(b) headed by the Military organization at Central Committee, better known as Voyenka (abbreviation derived from Voyennaya Kommissiya). Upon acquiring a state power the leadership of the RSDLP(b) adopted a decision at the 7th Congress of the Russian Communist Party (Bolsheviks) on formally disbanding of its military organizations. The military organizations were used to established local military revolutionary committees throughout cities of the Russian Empire and along its frontlines. After establishing a Soviet power in the capital of Russia the council continued to rely on decisions Petrograd VRK leadership and encouraged creation of new military revolutionary committees throughout the former Russian Empire that played a key role in solidifying of the Soviet power. By the beginning of 1918 the number of military revolutionary committees jumped to 220. In the Soviet historiography the role of Petrograd VRK was depicted as a preventative against the counter-revolution (such as the Kerensky–Krasnov uprising) rather than an instigator of revolution.

=== List of Military Revolutionary Committees of Russia ===
- Petrograd VRK created on October 25, 1917 (existed until December 18, 1917)
- 12th Army VRK (Cēsis) created on October 31, 1917 (famous Latvian Riflemen)
- Estland VRK created on November 4, 1917
- Northern front VRK created on November 4–5, 1917 (until November 8 - Pskov VRK)
- Moscow VRK created on November 7, 1917
- Voronezh revkom created on November 7, 1917
- Ryazan VRK created on November 8, 1917
- Western front and Northwestern region VRK (originally Minsk VRK) created on November 9, 1917
- Samara VRK created on November 9, 1917
- Tula revkom created on November 9, 1917
- Tom VRK created on November 10, 1917
- Smolensk revkom created on November 11, 1917
- Kiev VRK created on November 11, 1917
- Dagestan VRK created on November 21, 1917
- Orenburg VRK created on November 27, 1917
- Southwestern front VRK created on December 1, 1917
- Romanian front VRK created on December 15, 1917
- Barnaul VRK created on December 20, 1917
- Kharkov VRK created on December 23, 1917
- Yekaterinburg VRK
- Vinnytsia VRK
- Odessa VRK
- Simferopol VRK
- Sevastopol revkom created on December 29, 1917
- Astrakhan revkom created in January 1918
- Caucasus Army VRK created on January 10, 1918
- Don VRK created on January 23, 1918
- Kuban-Black Sea VRK created on January 30, 1918
- Semirechye (Seven rivers) VRK created on March 2, 1918

== People's Commissars ==
- Nikolai Podvoisky (8 November 1917 — 13 March 1918)
- Leon Trotsky (14 March 1918 — 12 November 1923)
