= Petrograd Military Revolutionary Committee =

Militant group of the Petrograd Soviet from November to December 1917

- Abbreviation: PVRK
- Predecessor: Bolshevik Military Organizations
- Successor: Political Directorate of the Soviet Army and Soviet Navy
- Formation: October 19, 1917; 109 years ago
- Dissolved: December 18, 1917; 108 years ago
- Type: Military
- Purpose: Enforcement
- Headquarters: Smolny, Petrograd
- Official language: Russian
- Chairman: Pavel Lazimir
- President of the Petrograd Soviet: Leon Trotsky
- Affiliations: RSDLP (Bolsheviks), Left SR, Petrograd Soviet
- Formerly called: Committee for Struggle Against the Counter-Revolution

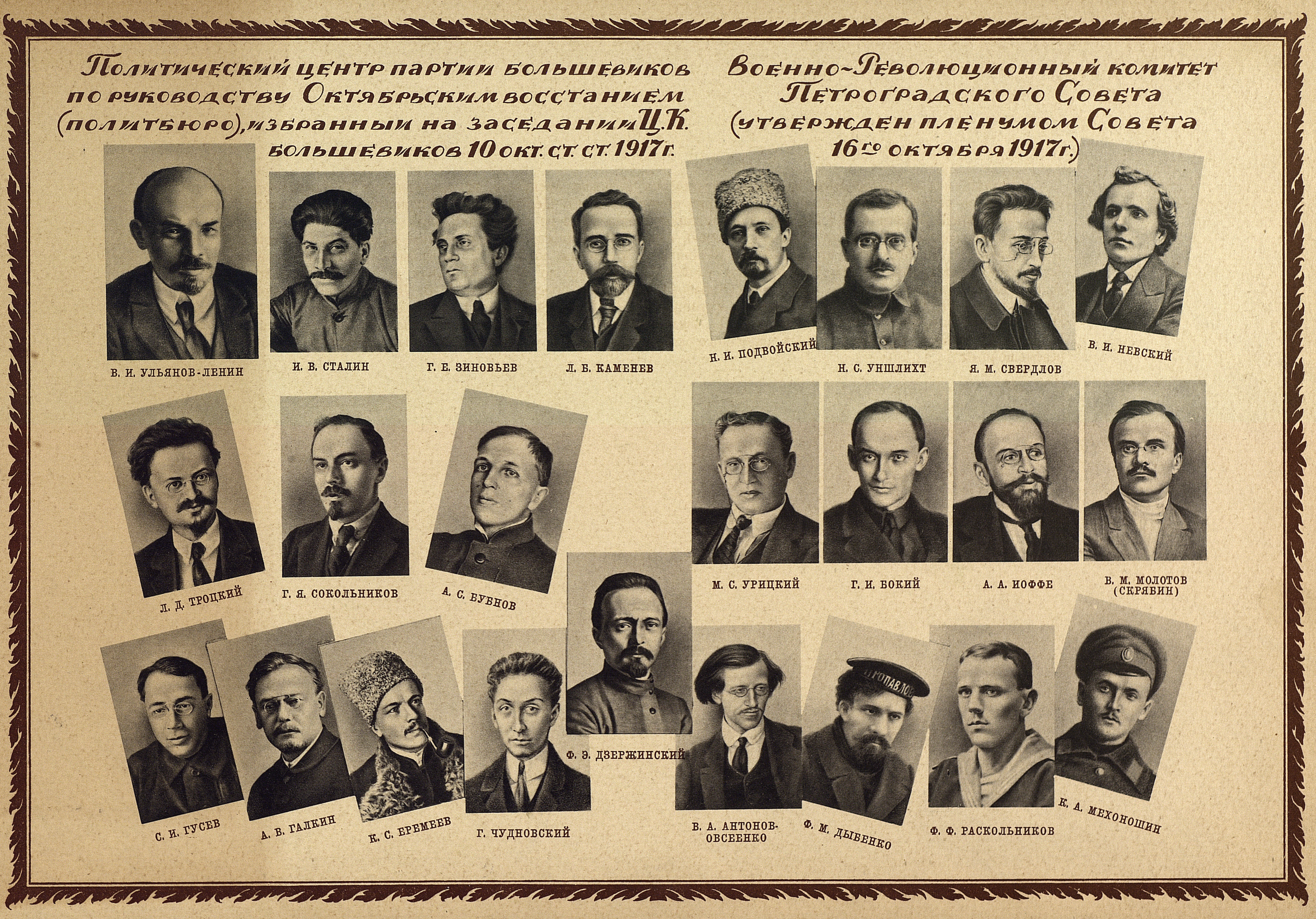
Political center of the Bolshevik Party that headed the October Uprising (Politburo) elected at a session of the Bolshevik's Central Committee on 23 October 1917 (left group) and Military Revolutionary Committee of the Petrograd Soviet (confirmed by plenum of the Soviet on 29 October 1917) (right group).

The Petrograd Military Revolutionary Committee (PMRC) (Russian: Петроградский военно-революционный комитет, romanized: Petrogradskiy voyenno-revolyutsionnyy komitet) was a militant group of the Petrograd Soviet and one of several military revolutionary committees that were created in the Russian Republic. Initially the committee was created on 25 October 1917 after the German army secured the city of Riga and the West Estonian Archipelago (see Operation Albion). The committee's resolution was adopted by the Petrograd Soviet on October 29, 1917.

From October 29 to November 11, 1917 it was a body of the Petrograd Soviet, later the All Russian Central Executive Committee. From November 8, 1917 to December 18, 1917 the committee was the highest extraordinary body of state power. All its activities were conducted under the supervision of the Central Committee of the RSDLP(b) and Lenin, who was a member, personally. Among its numerous other members were Leon Trotsky, Nikolai Podvoisky, Felix Dzerzhinsky, Yakov Sverdlov, Andrei Bubnov, Moisei Uritsky, Vladimir Antonov-Ovseenko, Joseph Stalin, and Pavel Lazimir, who was its chairman.

== Petrograd Milrevcom ==
=== Inception ===
Although it took its form and inspiration from the earlier Committee for Struggle Against the Counter-Revolution of the Kornilov Affair, the Military Revolutionary Committee itself was only formed during the last weeks, and indeed days, of the Provisional Government's existence. On 18 October [O.S. 5 October] 1917, General Polkovnikov, the commander of the Petrograd Military District, ordered the bulk of the capital's garrison units (those considered by the Provisional Government to be politically unreliable) to prepare for immediate transfer to the front. Given the inflamed political atmosphere this was, perhaps unsurprisingly, a fatal miscalculation on behalf of Alexander Kerensky and quickly sparked a "general mutiny" with most garrison units openly declaring loyalty to the Petrograd Soviet. It was in the city's soviet on 22 October [O.S. 9 October] that the crisis truly exploded and the body, by now with a Bolshevik majority, adopted a militant resolution authored by Leon Trotsky, that specifically called for the creation of a 'military revolutionary centre' to "facilitate the revolutionary defence of Petrograd... from the attacks being openly prepared by military and civil Kornilovites". Over the following days the composition and structure of this new MRC was decided upon, albeit without reference to Trotsky's inflammatory provocation to the Provisional Government, and the body was ratified by the Soviet on 29 October [O.S. 16 October]. It began to gather in the Smolny on 31 October [O.S. 18 October] and its first official meeting was not held until 2 November [O.S. 20 October]. Its chair was the Left SR turned Bolshevik Pavel Lazimir.

The following days saw the escalation of the garrison crisis as unit after unit declared their willingness to obey the Petrograd Soviet, with only three of the eighteen garrison representatives expressing confidence in the Provisional Government. Establishing its authority amongst the garrison was the immediate focus of the MRC; it began to dispatch its own commissars to the garrison formations and on 3 November [O.S. 21 October] a delegation, including Lazimir, formally asserted the committee's claim to prior command before General Polkovnikov. According to Czech historian Dr.Michal Reiman, this act can be considered the true beginning of the October Revolution: "Already on October 21 and 22 the Military Revolutionary Committee, in effect, took upon itself authority over the garrison. Its actions, from both a practical and a juridical standpoint, would be considered by any nation a clear case of mutiny and insurrection". With the loyalty of the garrisons secure, the following days would see the MRC locked into a confrontation with the Kerensky regime and culminating in the pronouncement of 6 November [O.S. 24 October]:

Citizens:

The counter-revolution has raised its criminal head. The Kornilovites are mobilising their forces in order to crush the All Russian Congress of Soviets and to wreck the Constituent Assembly. At the same time the pogrom-makers may attempt to cause trouble and slaughter in the streets of Petrograd.

The Petrograd Soviet of Workers' and Soldiers' Deputies takes upon itself the defence of revolutionary order against attempts at counter-revolution and pogroms.

Throughout the following events of the October Revolution the MRC would play the crucial role of coordinating the thousands of soldiers, sailors, and armed workers involved in seizing control of the city. It was on its authority that the Provisional Government was ultimately disbanded and power transferred to the Second All-Russian Congress of Workers' and Soldiers' Deputies' Soviets. A pamphlet titled "To the citizens of Russia" was signed by the Revolutionary Military Committee of the Petrograd Soviet of Workers' and Soldiers Deputies and dated "10am, October 25, 1917". It reads:

The Provisional Government has been deposed. State power has passed into the hands of the organ of the Petrograd Soviet of Workers' and Soldiers' Deputies – the Military Revolutionary Committee, which heads the Petrograd proletariat and the garrison.

The cause for which the people have fought, namely, the immediate offer of a democratic peace, the abolition of landed proprietorship, workers' control over production, and the establishment of Soviet power – this cause has been secured.

Long live the revolution of the workers, soldiers and peasants!

— To the citizens of Russia

Bolshevik revolutionary leader Joseph Stalin pointed out that the Military Committee was created to guard against counter-revolution by the Kerensky government, and to protect the Soviets, but this was already a significant act of armed insurrection that almost instantly translated into the overthrow of the Kerensky government. Even after the decision was made to overthrow Kerensky, the rhetoric of the Bolsheviks focused on defending the democratic gains from Kerensky though they were not only planning defense, but also revolutionary attack: "The characteristic feature of this period is the rapid growth of the crisis, the utter consternation reigning among the ruling circles, the isolation of the Socialist-Revolutionaries and Mensheviks, and the mass flight of the vacillating elements to the side of the Bolsheviks. A peculiar feature of the tactics of the revolution in this period must be noted, namely, that the revolution strove to take every, or nearly every, step in its attack in the guise of defence. Undoubtedly, the refusal to allow the troops to be withdrawn from Petrograd was an important step in the revolution's attack; nevertheless, this attack was carried out under the slogan of protecting Petrograd from possible attack by the external enemy. Undoubtedly, the formation of the Revolutionary Military Committee was a still more important step in the attack upon the Provisional Government; nevertheless, it was carried out under the slogan of organising Soviet control over the actions of the Headquarters of the Military Area. Undoubtedly, the open transition of the garrison to the side of the Revolutionary Military Committee and the organisation of a network of Soviet Commissars marked the beginning of the uprising; nevertheless, the revolution took these steps under the slogan of protecting the Petrograd Soviet from possible action by the counterrevolution. The revolution, as it were, masked its actions in attack under the cloak of defence in order the more easily to draw the irresolute, vacillating elements into its orbit. This, no doubt, explains the outwardly defensive character of the speeches, articles and slogans of that period, the inner content of which, none the less, was of a profoundly attacking nature."

In Lessons of October, Leon Trotsky, who was one of the leaders of the Russian October Revolution and considered second only to Lenin, argues that the Petrograd Soviet essentially entered a state of armed insurrection before 7 November [O.S. 25 October]: "From the moment when we, as the Petrograd Soviet, invalidated Kerensky's order transferring two-thirds of the garrison to the front, we had actually entered a state of armed insurrection... the outcome of the insurrection of October 25 was at least three-quarters settled, if not more, the moment that we opposed the transfer of the Petrograd garrison; created the Military Revolutionary Committee (October 16)...". Kerensky's order was issued not long after the Bolsheviks gained a majority in the Petrograd Soviet and Trotsky was elected Chairman (the latter took place on 9 October [O.S. 26 September] 1917. The Soviet took the view that Kerensky was attempting to remove the revolutionary-leaning troops who were following the directions of the soviet, and replace them with ones who would not oppose his orders.

=== Milrevcom as the first proletarian government ===
On the second anniversary of the October Revolution, a friend of Trotsky, Adolf Ioffe, wrote an article on the Military Revolutionary Committee of the Petrograd Soviet for the Communist International titled “The First Proletarian Government.” Leon Trotsky, who had been elected president of the MRC, stated that "[t]he decision to create a Military Revolutionary Committee, first introduced on [October] 9th, was passed at a plenary session of the Soviet only a week later [...] [f]our days more were required to form the Committee." Trotsky says that the MRC "went to work only on the 20th, five days before the insurrection." The MRC was formed in response to the decision of the Provisional Government under Kerensky to transfer to the front military units that were suspected of being too strongly under the influence of Bolsheviks or other radical parties.

Initially, the MRC had 66 identified members. Of these members, 48 were Bolsheviks, fourteen were Left Socialist-Revolutionaries, and four were Anarchists. In contrast to the Bolsheviks, the Left Socialist-Revolutionaries abided by their own official ideology of Radical Populism, and the Anarchists, from the Federation of Anarchist Groups, had Anarcho-Syndicalist views.

The Left Socialist-Revolutionaries broke off from the more moderate Socialist-Revolutionary Party in the fall of 1917 and allied with the Bolsheviks. They were considered to be the party of the peasantry and their main agenda was the redistribution of property from the landlords and their estates.

Leon Trotsky, stated that "[o]f the Social Revolutionaries only Lazimir did any work, and he was even placed at the head of the bureau in order to emphasise the fact that the Committee was a Soviet and not a party institution [...] the MRC's "chief workers [were] Podvoisky, Antonov-Ovseenko, Lashevich, Sadovsky, and Mekhonoshin" and that they all "relied exclusively upon Bolsheviks".

The MRC was made up of its headquarters and corps of commissars who reported directly to the headquarters. The commissars were mostly Bolsheviks who were formerly political prisoners of the Provisional Government. Between 3–6 November [O.S. 21–24 October] 1917, they successfully deposed the standing commissars of the Central Executive Committee of the First Congress of Soviets, who were mostly Mensheviks and Socialist Revolutionaries, and thereby ensured that the military would be under their command. On 6–7 November [O.S. 24–25 October], the Bolsheviks, through the MRC, were able to assume power.

The headquarters of the MRC was located on the third floor of the Smolny Young Ladies’ College. Originally, it had seven departments: defense, supplies, communications, information bureau, workers’ militia, reporting section, and commandant’s office. On 2 November [O.S. 20 October], the department of revolutionary air services was added, and on 6 November [O.S. 24 October], a motor transport allocation section was added. The immediate tasks the MRC faced after seizing power from the Provisional Government were curbing resistance, taking control of essential utilities and government offices, preventing pogroms and looting, and above all, defeating a coup attempt by military cadets and fighting the Cossacks who were sent by Kerensky to retake Petrograd. However, shortly after the insurrection, the MRC found itself dealing with mostly civil administration duties.

=== Functions ===
By 10 November [O.S. 28 October], the MRC appointed 185 commissars to various civil agencies. The most urgent problem facing the MRC was providing food to the population of Petrograd. After the October insurrection, levels of grain stock in Petrograd were so low that they were insufficient to supply the city with the daily ration of half a pound of bread for even one day. The MRC imposed even stricter food controls and sent “flying food-supply squads” to the other provinces, followed by stiff penalties against possible speculation on the new incoming provisions.

The MRC also took it upon itself to censor the press. In 1917, Petrograd had over 150 newspapers and other periodicals, and 450 journals. In keeping with the first point of Lenin’s three point program concerning the press, the MRC would forcibly close critical publications and hand over the facilities to Bolshevik sympathizers (the following two points were a state monopoly on advertising and allocating printing services and supplies to socialist parties and citizen groups in proportion to their size). On 8 November [O.S. 26 October], the MRC in Petrograd shut down seven newspapers that had supported the Provisional Government. During its tenure, the MRC in Petrograd shut down up to five newspapers a day on suspicions of being counter-revolutionary.

Other duties performed by the MRC included political policing against possible counter-revolutionaries, issuing of exit visas and various permits, controlling foreign trade outlets, censoring of the press, distribution of various goods to both the military and civilian population, allocation of housing, licensing of theatrical performances, etc.

Eventually, many of the duties of the MRC were overtaken by the Council of People's Commissars that was formed after the October insurrection, as well as other new and/or newly renovated administrative offices. The MRC was officially abolished on 18 December [O.S. 5 December] 1917.

== Revival ==
The committee was briefly revived as the Committee of Revolutionary Defense of Petrograd on February 21, 1918 by the Sovnarkom decree "Socialist Homeland is in Danger!" That committee was liquidated upon signing of the Treaty of Brest-Litovsk on March 3, 1918.
