= Petrograd Soviet =

City council of Petrograd (1917–1924)

Petrograd Soviet Петроградский совет (Russian)
- City council

Type
- Type: Unicameral

History
- Established: 12 March 1917
- Disbanded: 26 January 1924; 102 years ago
- Succeeded by: Lensovet

Leadership
- Chairman: Nikolay Chkheidze; Leon Trotsky; Grigory Zinoviev; Irakli Tsereteli

Meeting place
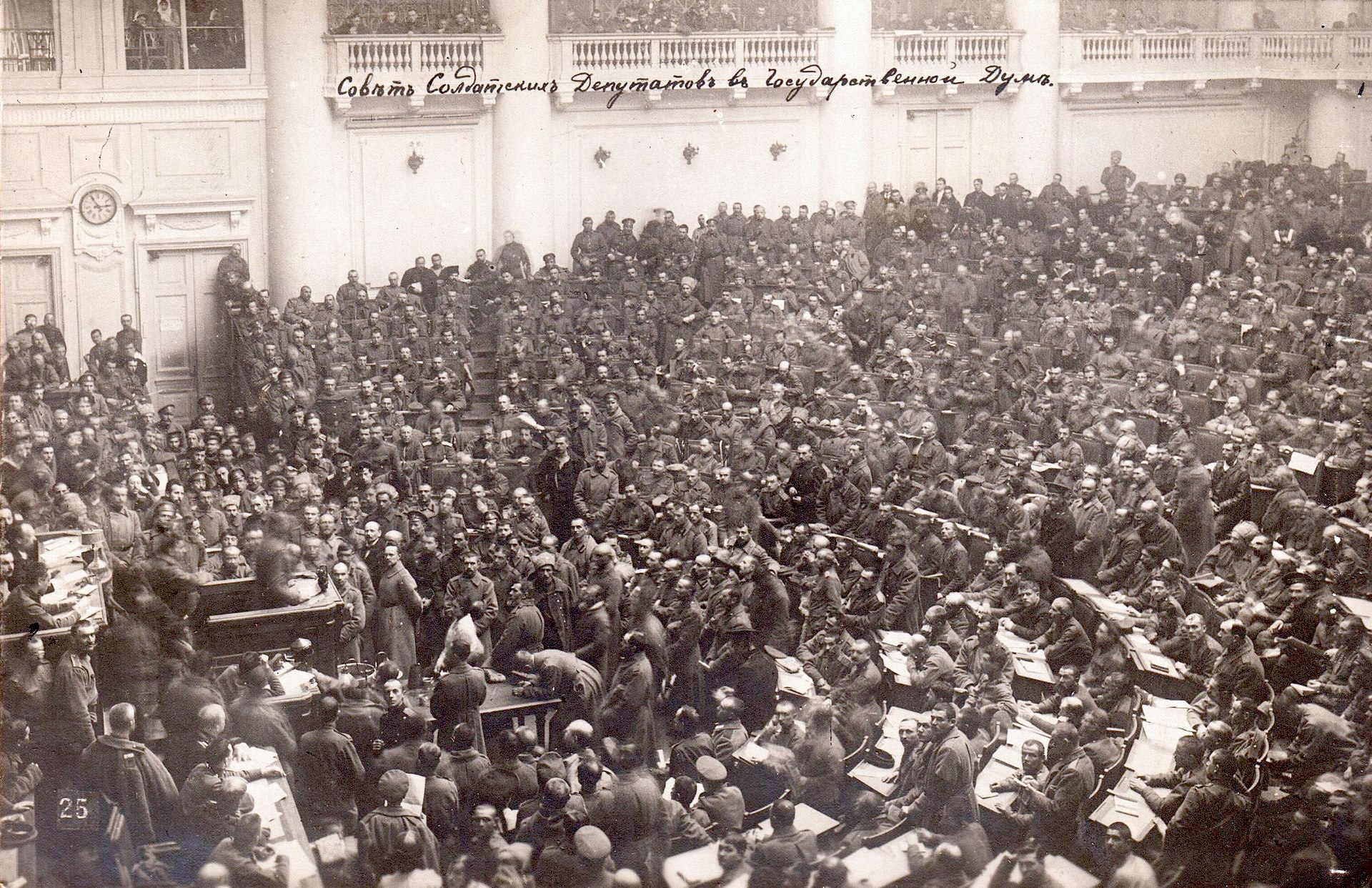
- Petrograd, Russia

The Petrograd Soviet of Workers' and Soldiers' Deputies (Russian: Петроградский совет рабочих и солдатских депутатов, Petrogradsky soviet rabochih i soldatskikh deputatov) was a city council of Petrograd (Saint Petersburg), the capital of Russia at the time. For brevity, it is usually called the Petrograd Soviet (Russian: Петроградский совет, Petrogradsky soviet).

This Soviet was established in March 1917 after the February Revolution as a representative body of the city's workers and soldiers, while the city already had its well-established city council, the Saint Petersburg City Duma (Central Duma). During the revolutionary days, the council tried to extend its jurisdiction nationwide as a rival power center to the Provisional Government, creating what in Soviet historiography is known as the dvoyevlastiye (dual power). Its committees were key components during the Russian Revolution (1917) and some of them led the armed revolt of the October Revolution.

== Formation ==
Before 1914, Petrograd was known as Saint Petersburg, and in 1905, the workers' soviet called the St Petersburg Soviet was created. But the main precursor to the 1917 Petrograd Soviet was the Central Workers' Group (Центральная Рабочая Группа, Tsentral'naya Rabochaya Gruppa), founded in November 1915 by the Mensheviks to mediate between workers and the new Central War Industry Committee in Petrograd. The group became increasingly radical as World War I progressed and the economic situation worsened, encouraging street demonstrations and issuing revolutionary proclamations.

On 27 January 1917 (all dates Old Style) the entire leadership of the Central Workers' Group was arrested and taken to the Peter and Paul Fortress on the orders of Alexander Protopopov, the Minister of the Interior in Imperial Russia. They were freed by a crowd of disaffected soldiers on the morning of 27 February, the beginning of the February Revolution, and the chairman convened a meeting to organize and elect a Soviet of Workers' Deputies that day.

That evening, between 69 and 300 people attended the meeting at the Tauride Palace. A provisional executive committee (Ispolkom) was chosen, named the "Provisional Executive Committee of the Soviet of Workers' Deputies" and chaired by Nikolay Chkheidze, and with mostly Menshevik deputies. Izvestia was chosen as the official newspaper of the group. The following day, 28 February, was the plenary session; elected representatives from factories and the military joined the soviet, and again moderates dominated. Non-representative voting and enthusiasm gave the Soviet almost 3,000 deputies in two weeks, of whom the majority were soldiers. The meetings were chaotic, confused, and unruly, little more than a stage for speechmakers. The party-based Ispolkom quickly took charge of actual decision-making.

Irakli Tsereteli was another very influential figure inside the Soviet.

=== Chairmen ===
- Nikolay Chkheidze, 12 March 1917 – 19 September 1917
- Leon Trotsky, 25 September [O.S. 8 October] 1917 – 26 October [O.S. 8 November] 1917
- Grigory Zinoviev, 13 December 1917 – 26 March 1926

=== Executive committee ===
The members of the executive committee, called Ispolkom, came only from political groups, with every socialist party given three seats (agreed 18 March). This created an intellectual and radical head to the peasant-, worker-, and soldier-dominated body. The executive committee meetings were more intense and almost as disorderly as the public meetings and were often extremely long.

On 1 March, the executive committee resolved to remain outside any new State Duma. This allowed the group to criticize without responsibility, and kept them away from any potential backlash. On 2 March, the Soviet received the eight-point program of the Provisional Committee of the State Duma, appointed an oversight committee (nabliudatel'nyi komitet), and issued a decidedly conditional statement of support. Moreover, the Soviet undermined the Provisional Government by issuing its own orders, beginning with the seven-article Order No. 1. The Soviet was not opposed to the war – internal divisions produced a public ambivalence–but was deeply worried about counterrevolutionary moves from the military, and was determined to have garrison troops firmly on its side.

=== Other committees ===
- Petrograd Military Revolutionary Committee (Milrevkom)
- Committee on Revolutionary Defense

== Power struggle with the Provisional Government ==
The Petrograd Soviet developed into an alternate source of authority to the Provisional Government under (Prince) Georgy Lvov and later Alexander Kerensky.

This created a situation described as dvoevlastie (dual power), in which the Petrograd Soviet competed for legitimacy with the Provisional Government until the October Revolution.

The Ispolkom (the "executive committee") of the Petrograd Soviet often publicly attacked the Provisional Government as bourgeois and boasted of its de facto power over de jure authority (control over post, telegraphs, the press, railroads, food supply, and other infrastructure). A "shadow government" with a Contact Commission was created on 8 March to "inform... [the Provisional Government] about the demands of the revolutionary people, to exert pressure on the government to dissatisfy all these demands, and to exercise uninterrupted control over their implementation." On 19 March, the control extended into the military front lines with commissars appointed with Ministry of War support.

In March 1917, the Petrograd Soviet was opposed to the workers, which protested its deliberations with strikes. On 8 March, the Menshevik newspaper Rabochaia Gazeta even claimed that the strikers were discrediting the soviet by disobeying it.

The Ispolkom expanded to 19 members on 8 April, nine representing the Soldiers' Section, and ten the Workers' Section. All members were socialists, the majority Mensheviks or Socialist-Revolutionaries; there was no Bolshevik representation. After the first All-Russian Congress of Soviets (June/July 1917), the Petrograd Soviet began adding representatives from other parts of Russia and the front lines, renaming itself the All-Russian Soviet of Workers' and Soldiers' Deputies. The executive committee became the All-Russian Central Executive Committee (CEC or VTsIK) with over 70 members (but no peasant representatives). The mass meetings of the body tapered from daily in the first weeks to roughly weekly by April.

== Rise of the Bolsheviks ==
The rise of the Bolsheviks throughout 1917 is known as the Bolshevization of soviets. The Bolsheviks rapidly assumed the mantle of the official opposition, and took advantage of the new socialist presence in the Cabinet to attack them for the failures of the Provisional Government. The Bolsheviks began a strong run of propaganda. In June, 100,000 copies of Pravda (including Soldatskaya Pravda, Golos Pravdy, and Okopnaya Pravda) were printed daily. In July, over 350,000 leaflets were distributed. The July Days riots from July 16–17, inspired but not led by the Bolsheviks, were without success.

The rise of Kerensky, and the later shock of the Kornilov affair, polarized the political scene. The Petrograd Soviet moved steadily leftwards, just as those of the center and right consolidated around Kerensky. Despite the events in July, the Ispolkom moved to protect the Bolsheviks from serious consequences, adopting resolutions on August 4 and August 18 against the arrest and prosecution of Bolsheviks. Still wary of the Ispolkom, the government released many senior Bolsheviks on bail or promise of good behavior.

In the August 20 municipal elections, the Bolsheviks took a third of the votes, a 50% increase in three months.

During the Kornilov affair, the Ispolkom was forced to use the Bolsheviks' military as its main force against the "counter-revolution". Kerensky ordered the distribution of 40,000 rifles to the workers of Petrograd (some Red Guards), many of which ended in the hands of Bolshevik groups.

As other socialist parties abandoned the Soviet organizations, the Bolsheviks increased their presence. On 25 September, they gained a majority in the Workers' Section and Leon Trotsky was elected chairman. He directed the transformation of the Soviet into a revolutionary organ according to Bolshevik policies.

== October days of 1917 ==
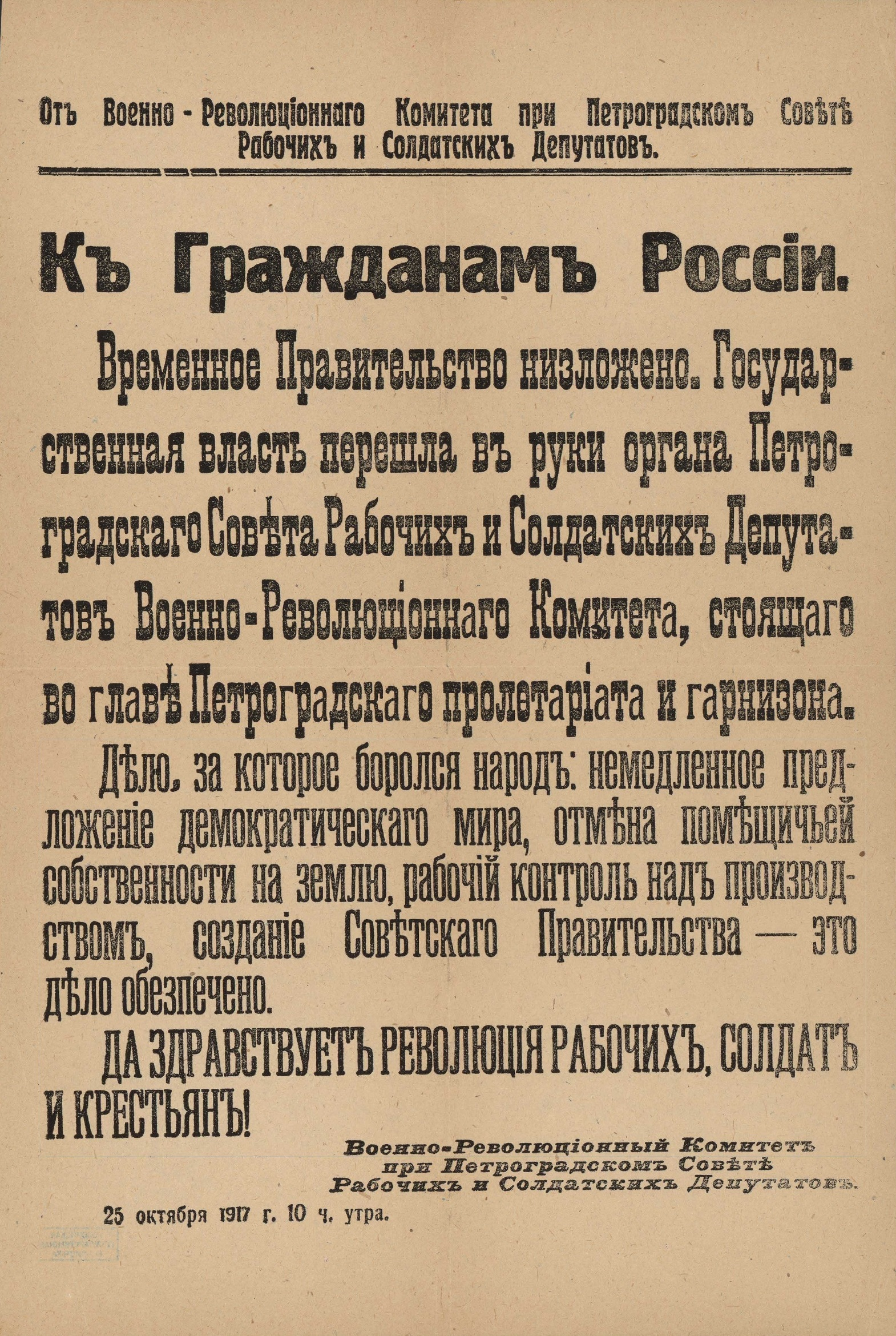
Milrevcom proclamation about the disbanding of the Russian Provisional Government

On 6 October, with a German advance threatening the city, the government - after advice from the military – made plans to evacuate to Moscow. The Ispolkom attacked the move, and Trotsky had the soldiers' section, who were mostly Mensheviks, vote on a resolution condemning the evacuation. The Provisional Government postponed evacuation indefinitely. Its attempts to dispatch Petrograd garrison units to the front were resisted by the troops and by the Ispolkom.

On 9 October, the Soviets considered the creation of a Committee of Revolutionary Defense. The Bolsheviks and Trotsky amended the resolution to include security of Petrograd against both German and domestic threats. The Plenum of the Soviet voted for a committee to "gather... all the forces participating in the defense of Petrograd... to arm the workers... ensuring the revolutionary defense of Petrograd... against the... military and civilian Kornilovites."

The Ispolkom approved the resolution, against Menshevik resistance, on 12 October, and the Soviet approved it on 16 October (despite warnings by the Mensheviks and SRs), creating the Military Revolutionary Committee (Voenno-Revoliutsionnyi Komitet), also called the Milrevcom or Military Committee.

The Military-Revolutionary Committee was chaired by Pavel Lazimir, with Nikolai Podvoisky as his deputy. It was a front for the activities of the Bolshevik's Military Organization. Podvoisky would take official control of the committee on the day of the uprising, with Vladimir Antonov-Ovseenko as secretary. The Ispolkom and the Provisional Government had been cut out of control of the forces in the Petrograd Military District, since very few of them remained loyal to them.

The Military Staff was sidelined on the night of 21 October, when the Milrevcom took exclusive control of the garrison in the name of the Soldiers' Section of the Soviet. The District Commander, Colonel Polkovnikov, refused to allow this control, and he and his staff were condemned in a Milrevcom public statement as "a direct weapon of the counter-revolutionary forces". The military command responded with an ultimatum to the Soviet, which led to delaying negotiations and meetings on 23 and 24 October.

The Bolshevik-popular uprising began on 24 October, when "liberal" forces tried to shut down Pravda and take other steps to secure the government. The Milrevcom sent armed groups to seize the main telegraph offices and lower the bridges across the Neva. That night, the Bolsheviks took control quickly and easily, since the vast majority of both the guard and the workers had sided with them, participating in the plans of the "Milrevcom".

The following morning at 10 am, the Milrevcom issued an announcement written by Lenin, declaring the end of the Provisional Government and the transfer of power to the Petrograd Soviet. In the early afternoon, Trotsky convened an Extraordinary Session of the Petrograd Soviet, to preempt the Congress of Soviets. It was packed with Bolsheviks and Left SR deputies.

That evening, the Second Congress of Soviets opened in the Assembly Hall in Smolny. The 600 or so delegates chose a Presidium of 3 Mensheviks and 21 Bolsheviks and Left SRs.

The following day, the Ispolkom rejected the workings of the Congress and called on the Soviets and the army to defend the Revolution. But in the evening, the Congress dismissed the Ispolkom and replaced it with a new group of 101 members (62 Bolsheviks) under Lev Borisovich Kamenev. It also approved the Decree on Peace, the Decree on Land and the formation of a new government – the Council of People's Commissars (Soviet Narodnykh Komissarov, abbreviated to Sovnarkom) – until the meeting of the Constituent Assembly. The Sovnarkom was meant to be an executive governing body directly accountable to the newly created Central Executive Committee (CEC/VTsIK) which would act as a standing-body of the (legislative) Soviet between full sessions of the Congress of Soviets, though in practice Sovnarkom would eclipse the CEC/TSiK in autonomy and power.
