= Bolshevik Military Organizations =

Illegal armed formations in the Russian Empire

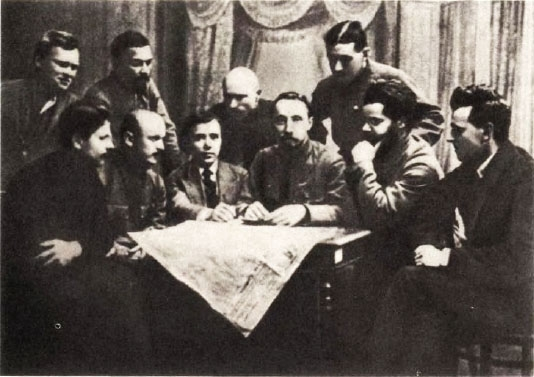
Bolshevik Military Organizations (from left to right) seated: Kirill Orlov, Konstantin Mekhonoshin, Vladimir Nevsky, Nikolai Podvoisky, Pyotr Dashkevich, Fyodor Raskolnikov; standing up: Boris Zanko, Mikhail Kedrov, Vasiliy Panyushkin, Alexander Tarasov-Rodionov

The Bolshevik Military and Battle Organizations (Russian: Военные и боевые организации большевиков) consisted of illegal armed formations (revolutionaries) of Bolsheviks (RSDLP(b)) in the Russian Empire. They played a leading role among combat detachments of working class and revolutionary instigation in the Russian Armed Forces, with the goal of creation and fortification of the "Revolution Armed Forces". Local committees of the Bolshevik Military Organization was also informally known as "Voyenka".

The first military and battle organizations were created by Bolsheviks during the 1905 Russian Revolution in bigger cities of the Russian Empire: Saint Petersburg, Moscow, Ivanovo-Voznesensk, Kronshtadt, Sevastopol, Saratov, Krasnoyarsk, Nizhniy Novgorod, Tomsk, Warsaw, Vladivostok, Riga and others. The statement of the 3rd Congress of the Russian Social Democratic Labour Party (25 April – 10 May, 1905), "About the armed uprising", had a significant meaning in the creation of military organization.

Officially, the Bolshevik Military Organizations were considered to be liquidated on decision of the 7th Congress of the Russian Communist Party (Bolsheviks) in March of 1918.

== See also ==
- Red Guards (Russia)
- SR Combat Organization
- Combat Organization of the Polish Socialist Party
- Military Revolutionary Committee
- Political Directorate of the Soviet Army and Soviet Navy
