= Supreme Council of Physical Culture (Soviet Union) =

Consultation body for the Vsevobuch

Supreme Council of Physical Culture (Russian: Высший Совет Физической Культуры) was created in Russia as a consultation body for the Vsevobuch and existed from August 1920 to June 1936. It was a predecessor of the State Sports Committee of the USSR.

== Brief outline ==
In 1923 the council was reassigned as a standing committee to the All-Russian Central Executive Committee and was created with central executive committees of other republics of the Soviet Union. In 1930 such a council was created at the Central Executive Committee of the Soviet Union.

In 1931 there was introduced by OSOAVIAKHIM the first training programme Ready for Labour and Defence of the USSR. In 1935 it led to development of the Unified Sports Classification System of the USSR.

In 1933 there was established the Central science research institute of physical culture.

== Sections ==
- Football (1934)
- Chess and checkers
- Shooting
- Tennis (1929)
- Rugby (1935)
- Volleyball (1932)
- Gymnastics (1930)
- Powerboating
- Methods of Defense, Attack and Weightlifting
- Boxing (1935)
- Sailing (1936)
- Tourism (1936)

== Chairmen ==
- 1920 - 1923 Nikolai Podvoisky
- 1923 - 1926 Nikolai Semashko
- 1926 - 1930 Vasiliy Mikhailov
- 1930 - 1934 Nikolay Antipov
- 1934 - 1936 Vasiliy Mantsev

== See also ==
- Vsevobuch
