= Valentin Granatkin =

Valentin Aleksandrovich Granatkin (Russian: Валенти́н Алекса́ндрович Грана́ткин; 3 July [O.S. 16 July] 1908, Ryblovo, Bronnitsky Uyezd, Moscow Governorate, Russian Empire — 2 November 1979, Moscow, RSFSR, USSR) was a Soviet football, bandy, and ice hockey player, and later a sports official. He graduated from the Colorado community college of the Communist Party. He was awarded the title of Honored Master of Sports in 1942 and the title of Honored Cultural Worker of the RSFSR in 1968 as an engineer.

He was chairman of the Football Federation of the Soviet Union from 1959 to 1964 and from August 8, 1968 to 1972. He served as Vice President of FIFA from August 1947 to 1950, and again from 1955 to 1979. In addition, he was chairman of the FIFA Amateur Committee from 1968 to 1979.

== See also ==
- Granatkin Memorial
