= Ready for Labour and Defence of the USSR =

Soviet physical training programme

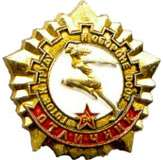
GTO With Honors golden badge

Ready for Labour and Defence of the USSR (Russian: «Готов к труду и обороне СССР» Gotov k trudu i oborone SSSR), abbreviated as GTO (Russian: ГТО) was the All-Union physical culture training programme, introduced in the USSR on March 11, 1931 on the initiative of the Komsomol. It was a complement to the Unified Sports Classification System of the USSR. While the latter provided Soviet physical education system requirements only for athletes, GTO was a programme for all Soviet people of almost all ages. By the year 1976, 220 million people were awarded GTO badges, while in 1986 the tests were passed by 33.9 million people.

It was restored in modern Russian Federation by Vladimir Putin under the same name in 2014.

== Evolution ==
=== Pre-World War II ===
Initially the GTO had one level with three age groups. To earn the GTO badge, an individual needed pass 21 tests, of which 13 had concrete norms. Sports in the country were only beginning to develop; there were a few physical culture collectives by enterprises and organizations, that could organize physical training, and the GTO provided the unique possibility to involve people into sports activities, hence the variety of tests. On December 7, 1932, the second level was introduced for the same three age groups. This was done to stimulate the improvement of skills of those who passed the first level. The second level had 24 tests, 19 of them had concrete norms. Each test result could be one of two: "passed" and "not passed".

The next change followed in 1934, when the third level had been introduced, with two age groups: for children 13-14 and 15–16 years of age. This level had a separate name - "Be Ready for Labour and Defence of the USSR" (Russian: "Будь готов к труду и обороне СССР"), abbreviated as "BGTO". This defined the structure of the GTO for many years: it had "BGTO", "GTO 1st level" and "GTO 2nd level" stages until 1972. After the structure of the GTO programme was established, next revisions dealt with the system of tests, applicable to evaluate physical conditions of different age groups of the population; improvements in norm requirements; specifying age limits of levels.

In 1939 the tense international situation caused the inclusion of tests, necessary to prepare young people for service in the Soviet Armed Forces, and to prepare all the population for the possible war. Such disciplines as "crawling over", "speedy foot march", "throwing a bunch of grenades", "rope (also pole and tree) climbing", "carrying over a cartridge box", various martial arts were introduced. Most of them were removed in post-Second World War revisions. Only "throwing a grenade" and "50 m small bore rifle shooting" (men only) remained.

=== 1945-1972 ===
The 1946 revision, along with the GTO's importance for military and labour activities, emphasized its health protection aspect. In many tests norms were reduced, reflecting the devastation and famine that worsened the health of the people. The 1959 revision saw a new system of evaluation. To earn the GTO badge, a person had to collect a certain number of points, passing all the tests. This stimulated the individual's interest in achieving the best results possible in all tests of the programme.

=== 1972 and beyond ===
The major changes in the GTO programme were done in 1972, after thorough scientific testing and approval of how it was to be put into practice, carried out by the All-Union NII of Physical Culture. The main principles of the programme were tested on a large scale in Severodonetsk and Salavat. The programme was approved on January 17, 1972 by a decision of the CPSU Central Committee and Council of Ministers of the USSR. The age limits were extended from 14-46 to 10-60 and comprised eight age groups on five levels (as compared to five age groups on three levels previously). Each of the levels (Russian: ступени) had its name. They were:

1. "Courageous and adroit" (Russian: "Смелые и ловкие") - for boys and girls 10-11 and 12–13 years of age
2. "Sports successors" (Russian: "Спортивная смена") - for teenagers 14–15 years of age
3. "Strength and courage" (Alternative: Strength and manliness Муж - man) (Russian: "Сила и мужество") - for teenagers 16–18 years of age
4. "Physical perfection" (Russian: "Физическое совершенство") - for men 19–39 and women 19–34 years of age
5. "Cheerfulness and health" (Russian: "Бодрость и здоровье") - for men 40-60 and women 35–55 years of age

There were two badges on each level; the silver GTO badge and the golden GTO badge, awarded to those who passed all the tests, fulfilling the respective norms. On the fourth level, "Physical perfection", there was also a special GTO With Honours golden badge, awarded to those, who fulfilled all norms required for the golden badge of the fourth level and was the First Class Sportsman in one sports discipline or the Second-Class Sportsman in two disciplines. Among the tests were running (100m, 1000m, 3000m), long jump, high jump, pull-ups, rising up with a turn on the high bar, dummy grenade throwing, cross-country skiing (5 km or 10 km; or 5 km running in southern regions), 50m small bore rifle shooting, swimming (100m with time, or 200m without time).

Since 1974 All-Union All Around GTO Сompetition was held, where the gold medal "USSR All Around GTO Champion" (Russian: Чемпион СССР по многоборью ГТО) was awarded for the first place. In 1975, 37 million people participated in the competition, of which 500 people qualified for the final rounds.

In 1979 the sixth level was introduced - "Ready for the start" (Russian: "К стартам готов") - for boys and girls 7–9 years of age. So, the GTO programme comprised almost all ages.

=== After the breakup of the USSR ===
After the breakup of the USSR in 1991, the GTO programme was eliminated in the most of former Soviet republics. In Russia the GTO programme did not exist for some ten years, but has begun to be revived since 2003. On March 24, 2014 president Vladimir Putin signed a decree to restore GTO in modern Russian Federation under the same traditional name: Ready for Labour and Defence.

== See also ==
- Voluntary Sports Societies of the Soviet Union
