= Vyacheslav Koloskov =

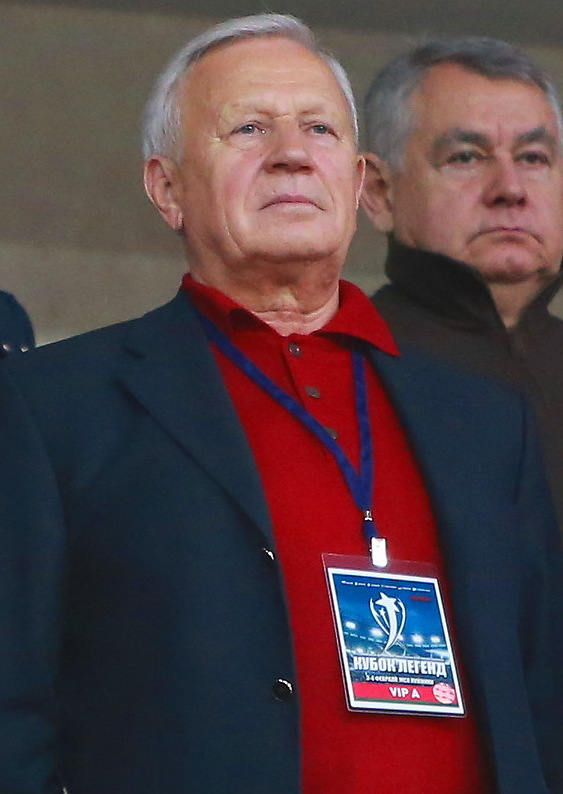
Koloskov in 2018

Vyacheslav Ivanovich Koloskov (Russian: Вячеслав Иванович Колосков; born June 15, 1941, Moscow, Russian SFSR, USSR) is a Russian and Soviet sport functionary, vice-president of FIFA (1980–1996).

== Career ==
He was a football player but without remarkable achievements. During his management of the Soviet Union national football team was a runner-up of UEFA Euro 1988, Olympic champion of Seoul and bronze winner of Moscow Olympic Games. Soviet football clubs FC Dinamo Tbilisi and FC Dynamo Kyiv won UEFA Cup Winners' Cup in 1981 and 1986.

Soviet Union national ice hockey team won Olympic gold medals in 1984 and 1988, Canada Cup in 1981, World Championships in 1981, 1982, 1983, 1986, 1989, 1990.

Koloskov was awarded by Order of the Badge of Honor (1980), Order of Friendship of Peoples (1989), Order of Merit for the Fatherland (1996).

He was the member of the organizing committee for the winning Russia's bid to host the 2018 FIFA World Cup.

One of his two sons, Konstantin, became a chief financial officer (CFO) at the United States Soccer Federation.

== See also ==
- Football Directorate
