= Physical Culture and Sports Committee of the Soviet Union =

Physical Culture and Sports Committee under the Council of Ministers
- Комитет по физической культуре и спорту при Совете министров СССР
- All ministry seals of the Soviet Union used the USSR coat of arms

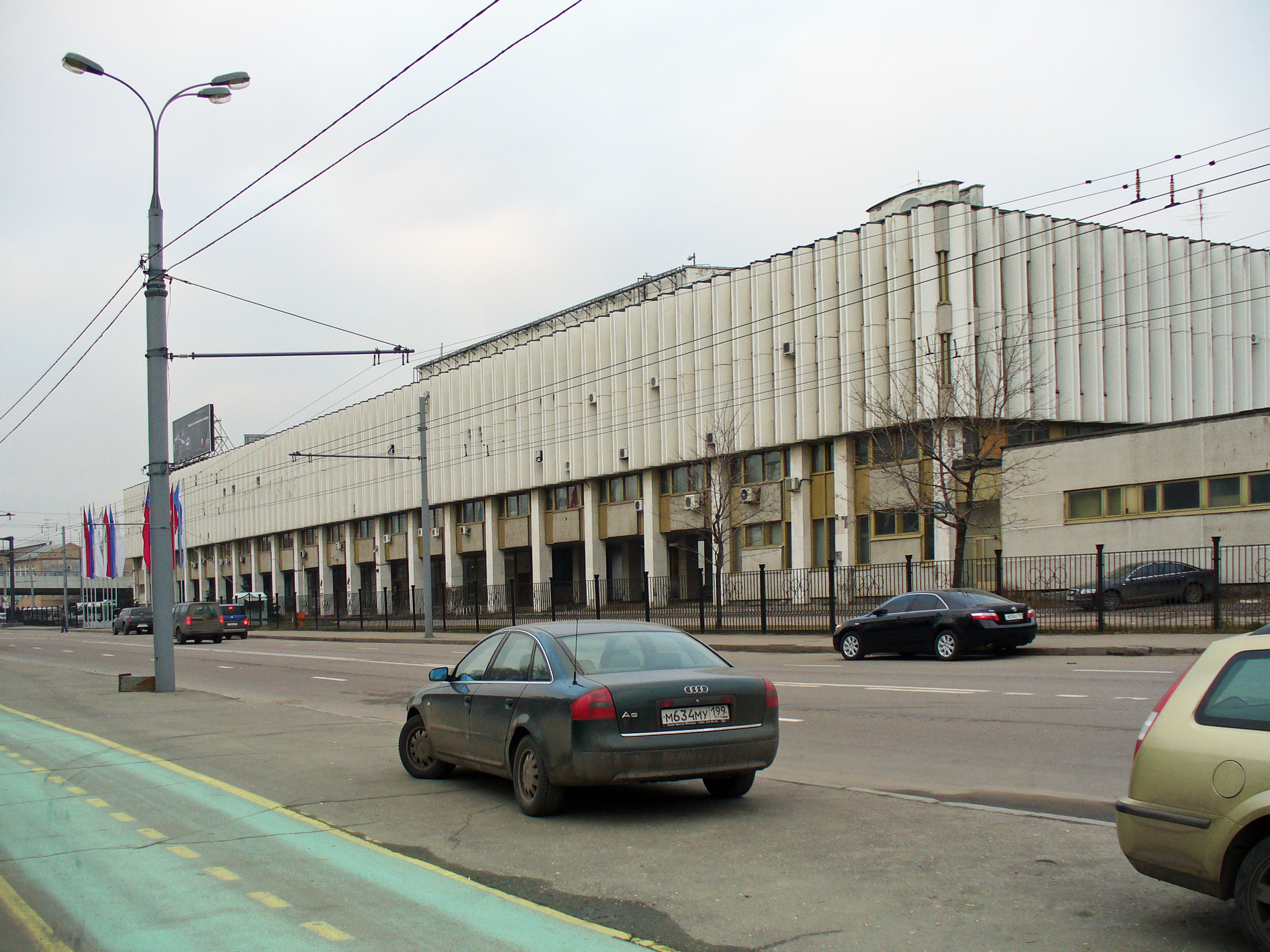

Agency overview
- Preceding agency: Supreme Council of Physical Culture
- Jurisdiction: USSR
- Headquarters: Moscow, Russia
- Agency executive: Chairman
- Parent agency: Council of Ministers of the Soviet Union

The Physical Culture and Sports Committee under the Council of Ministers of the Soviet Union (Russian: Комитет по физической культуре и спорту при Совете министров СССР, earlier known as the All-Union Council on Physical Culture and Sports (Russian: Всесоюзный совет физической культуры) was a main body of Soviet executive power in physical culture and sports originally established in August 1920 as part of the Soviet vsevobuch (Main directorate of General Military Education of the Russian People's Commissariat on War).

In 1936 it was transformed into an All-Union committee and a State committee.

At first it was established as interdepartamental commission, Supreme Council of Physical Culture which included representatives of Vseobuch, People's Commissariat of Enlightenment, People's Commissariat of Healthcare, trade unions, Russian League of Communist Youth (RKSM, later known as Komsomol), and sports-gymnastics societies. It also was a consultative agency to Vseobuch. Since 1923 and until 1936 it was a special agency of the Central Executive Committee of the Soviet Union.

Its main duties included

- development and review of programs, provisions, regulations, and guidelines on physical education;
- organization and holding of sports competitions;
- general management of sports organizations;
- preparation of physical culture cadres (staff);
- monitoring of the physical education of students;
- medical control over the health of those engaged in physical culture and sports.

== Chairmen ==
=== All-Union Council on Physical Culture ===
All-Union Council on Physical Culture	Period in office
Nikolai Podvoisky (Note: simultaneously the chairman of Vsevobuch)	1920–1923
Nikolai Semashko (Note: simultaneously the Russian People's Commissar of Healthcare)	1923–1926
Vasiliy Mikhailov	1926–1930
Nikolai Antipov	1930–1934
Vasiliy Mantsev	1934–1936

=== All-Union Committee on Physical Culture and Sports ===
On 1 April 1936, the All-Union council on Physical Culture was transformed into the All-Union Committee on Physical Culture and Sports in 1936–1953 and 1954–1959.

All-Union Committee on Physical Culture and Sports	Period in office
Ivan Kharchenko	1936–1937
Aleksandr Zelikov	1937–1938
Vasiliy Snegov	1939–1945
Nikolay Romanov	1945–1948
Arkadiy Apollonov	1948–1951
Nikolay Romanov	1951–1959

In 1953–1954 it was part of the Ministry of Healthcare and in 1959–1968 it was governed by the Union of Sports Societies and Organizations (SSOO).

After 1968 it was known as Sportkomitet and Goskomsport.

=== [State] Committee on Physical Culture and Sports ===
[State] Committee on Physical Culture and Sports	Period in office
Sergei Pavlov	1968–1983
Marat Gramov	1983–1989
Nikolai Rusak	1989–1991
