= Red Guards (Russia) =

Russian volunteer paramilitary units

Red Guards Russian: Красная гвардия
- Red flags were used by guards in several modifications and variations
- Leaders: RSDLP(b) and Soviets
- Dates active: 1917–1918 (became core units of the Red Army)
- Headquarters: Every major city
- Active regions: Russian Soviet Federative Socialist Republic and Russian Republic
- Ideology: Communism
- Political position: Far-left
- Part of: Red Army (since January 1918)
- Wars: The Russian Revolution of 1917 and Russian Civil War

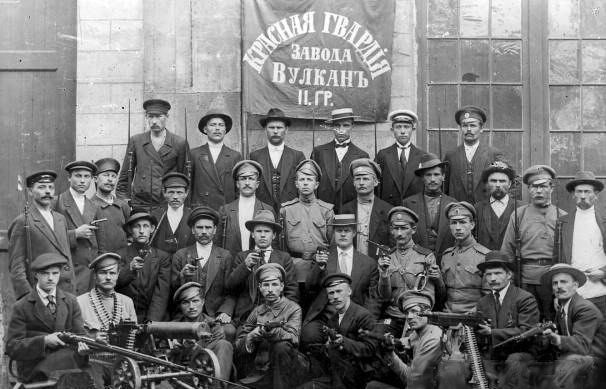
Red guard unit of the Vulkan factory in 1917

Red Guards (Russian: Красная гвардия) were paramilitary volunteer formations for the "protection of the soviet power", as part of the Bolshevik Military Organizations. The Red Guards consisted primarily of urban workers and cossacks, as well as a partial inclusion of peasants, soldiers, and sailors. Red Guards were a transitional military force of the collapsing Imperial Russian Army, and the base formations of Bolsheviks during the October Revolution and the first months of the Russian Civil War. Most of them were formed in the time frame of the Russian Revolution of 1917, and some of the units were reorganized into the Red Army during 1918. The Red Guards formations were organized across most of the former Russian Empire, including territories outside the contemporary Russian Federation such as Finland, Poland, Estonia, Ukraine, and others. They were not centralized, and were typically formed by decision of a local political party and local soviet members.

== Overview ==
Composing much of the urban population, they were the main strike force of several radically oriented socialist political factions. Red Guard units were created in March 1917 at manufacturing companies by Factory and Plant Committees and by some communist-inclined party cells (Bolsheviks, Left Socialist Revolutionaries, others). The Red Guards formations were based on the worker's strike forces of the Russian Revolution of 1905. Lenin gave a following evaluation of the phenomenon:

The lack is not in the "new motives", esteemed Manilovs, but in the military force, in the military force of revolutionary people (not people in general) that stands 1) in the armed proletariat and peasantry, 2) in the organized frontline formations out of representatives of those classes, 3) in the ready to side with people military formations. Taken all together, this is a revolutionary army.

— Vladimir Lenin, "Last word of "Iskra" tactics..."

A number of other militarized formations created during the February Revolution, such as "people's militia" (народная милиция), created by the Russian Provisional Government, "squads of self-defence" (отряды самообороны), "committees of public security" (комитеты общественной безопасности), "workers' squads" (рабочие дружины) were gradually unified into the Red Guards.

== Creation ==
On March 26, 1917, the Bureau of the Central Committee of the RSDRP(b) published a resolution "About the Provisional Government" since then the term, Red Guards, received the widest usage. The biggest centralized Red Guards formations were created in Petrograd and Moscow. Soon thereafter a series of attempts took place to legalize those formations. On April 14, 1917, the Moscow Committee of the Russian Social Democratic Labour Party (Bolsheviks) (RSDLP(b)) adopted a resolution for the creation of its Red Guard. On April 17 in Petrograd, the council of workers' squad's representatives created a commission for the formation of workers' guards and on April 29 a draft of its statue appeared in the Pravda newspaper.The Vyborg raion (district) council of Petrograd on April 28 declared to transform the squads of workers' and factory militia into the Red Guard squads. On May 17 the Samara council of workers' representatives (deputies) established a commission in the creation of Red Guard squads. A big role in the creation of the Red Guard squads played the Factory committees. Before April 1917, seventeen Russian cities created Red Guard squads, which by June increased in numbers to 24.

Red Guards were the base for the forming of the Red Army. Therefore, the term is often used as just another English name for the Red Army in reference to the times of the Russian Revolution and Russian Civil War.

In Petrograd, the head of the Red Guards (30,000 personnel) was Konstantin Yurenev. At the time of the October Revolution, the Russian Red Guards had 200,000 personnel. After the revolution, the Red Guards performed some of the functions of the regular army, between the time the new Soviet government began demobilizing the old Russian military and the time the Red Army was created in January 1918.

== Organization ==
During the revolution, training of the Red Guards was arranged by the Military Organization of the RSDLP (Bolshevik Military Organizations).

Enlistment was voluntary, but required recommendations from Soviets, Bolshevik party units or other public organizations. The military training of workers was often performed without disengagement from the work at plants. There were both infantry and mounted regiments. At different places, the organization was nonuniform in terms of subordination, headcount, degree of military training. This state was often called "half-partisan". While successful at local conflicts (e.g., with ataman Alexander Dutov in Orenburg guberniya), this loose organization was inefficient when combating larger, organized forces of the White Army. Therefore, when the creation of the Red Army was decreed, Red Guards had become the Army Reserve and the base for the formation of regular military detachments.
