= Nikolai Starostin =

Soviet footballer and hockey player (1902–1996)

Nikolai Starostin

Nikolai Petrovich Starostin (Cyrillic: Никола́й Петро́вич Ста́ростин; 26 February 1902 – February 17, 1996) was a Soviet footballer and ice hockey player, and founder of Spartak Moscow.

== Early life and Spartak Moscow ==
The eldest of four brothers, Starostin was born in Presnensky District, Moscow where he enjoyed a comfortable upbringing courtesy of his father's reasonably well paid job as a hunting guide for the Imperial Hunting Society. Nikolai studied at a commercial academy where he first began playing football. Football was a minor concern in Russia in this period, but it was growing. A Moscow league had been founded in 1910 but this died away in the years following the revolution of 1917. Starostin is said to have welcomed the revolution, though he played no active role in it. Following the death of his father from typhoid in 1920, Starostin supported his family by playing football in the summer and ice hockey in the winter.

In 1921 the Moscow Sport Circle (later Krasnaia Presnia) was formed by Ivan Artemev and involved Starostin, especially in its football team. The team grew, building a stadium, supporting itself from ticket sales and playing matches across Russia. As part of a 1926 reorganisation of football in the USSR, Starostin arranged for the club to be sponsored by the food workers union and the club moved to the 13,000 seat Tomskii Stadium. The team changed sponsors repeatedly over the following years as it competed with Dynamo Moscow, whose 35,000 seat Dynamo Stadium lay close by.

As a high-profile sportsman, Starostin came into close contact with Alexander Kosarev, secretary of the Komsomol (Communist Union of Youth) who already had a strong influence on sport and wanted to extend it. In November 1934, with funding from Promkooperatsiia, Kosarev employed Starostin and his brothers to develop his team to make it more powerful. Again the team changed its name, this time to Spartak Moscow. It took its name from the Roman slave rebel and athlete Spartacus. Like Spartacus, the club seemed to represent the exploited, as opposed to their rivals Dynamo Moscow (run by the secret police) and CSKA Moscow (run by the army.) Starostin played for and managed Spartak, and his three brothers also played for the team.

In 1936 new league and cup competitions were introduced in Russia. In the first year Dynamo won the league and Spartak the cup. In 1937 the positions were reversed but Spartak won both league and cup in 1938 and 1939, much to the annoyance of Lavrenty Beria, the head of the secret police, who was also the president of Dynamo. A keen footballer in his youth, Beria had played against Starostin in the 1920s, suffering humiliating defeat. The Dynamo-Spartak rivalry became the bitterest in Soviet sport.

For Soviet Union performance at the 1937 Workers' Summer Olympiad in Antwerpen, he was honoured with his first Order of Lenin as part of the Soviet athletic team at the Olympiad. Similar honours received number of other athletes along with Soviet sports societies of Spartak and Dynamo.

== Arrest ==
In the late 1930s many of Starostin's friends and associates were arrested as part of the Great Purge, including Kosarev. There were also attempts to more closely control sporting matters, including forcing the Semi-final of the 1939 cup to be replayed after Spartak won the first match by a disputed goal. They went on to win the replay, which did not take place until after Spartak had already won the final. On March 20, 1942, Starostin was arrested, along with his three brothers and other fellow players, facing accusations of involvement in a plot to kill Joseph Stalin. Following two years of interrogation in the Lubyanka, the charges were dropped but the Starostins were tried and sentenced to ten years in Siberia anyway, having been found guilty of "lauding bourgeois sport and attempting to drag bourgeois mores into Soviet sport". The sentence was very lenient in view of the popularity of football and Starostin. When details from the actual court sentence were published in 2003, it turned out Starostins were not convicted for political crimes, but rather for stealing sporting goods from the stores they were supposed to oversee and selling those goods. Nikolai Starostin profited for 28,000 rubles, Aleksandr for 12,000, Andrei and Pyotr for 6,000 each.у Also, Nikolai Starostin was convicted of bribing the military commisar of the Bauman district of Moscow, Kutarzhevskiy. Kutarzhevskiy, using his power arranged so that several people who were supposed to have been conscripted to serve in the Army during World War II were not sent to the front and stayed in Moscow instead. Those people included food distributors and food store managers, who in turn provided Starostin with unlimited food supply during the war time, when food shortages were common (according to the sentence, food store manager Zvyozdkin gave Starostin 60 kilograms of butter and 50 kilograms of meat products).

During his time in the gulags, Starostin's skills were highly sought after and he served as coach at various camps. He was treated benevolently by commanders who looked kindly on football and gave him extensive privileges. Unlike other notable inmates, Starostin was never mistreated and was well liked among both guards and prisoners, who would gather to listen to his football stories.

In 1948 Starostin received a phone call in the camp from Stalin's son Vasily. The two had known each other in the 1930s when Starostin's daughter had made friends with him at the Spartak horse riding club, when he was using the name 'Volkov'. He was now commander in chief of the Soviet Air Forces and brought Starostin back to Moscow to coach the Air Force's football team (VVS Moscow), in which role he became a pawn in the conflict between Vasily and Lavrentiy Beria. NKVD officials (Beria was heading the law enforcement ministry) soon visited Starostin at his home, giving him 24 hours to leave Moscow. Vasily reacted by taking Starostin into his protection. The two spent all their time together, even sleeping in the same wide bed (Vasily with a gun under his pillow).

On one occasion when Vasily was drunk Starostin slipped out of an open window to see his family. He was apprehended by the secret police at 6am the next morning and sent to the Maykop gulag. At Orel, however, Vasily's head of counter espionage met the train to return Starostin to Moscow. Starostin instead asked to be allowed to live in Southern Russia. Vasily agreed on condition that he coach the local Dynamo team. The secret police intercepted him, however, and he was exiled for life to Kazakhstan. Starostin was initially sent to Akmolinsk, where he coached the local football team. He later moved to Alma Ata to coach ice hockey and football with the Kairat team. Starostin's efforts contributed to the club's position as the leading Kazakh team in the Soviet era.

== Release ==
Stalin died on 5 March 1953. Beria, who had initially been part of the leading group after Stalin's death, was executed later that year. As part of the movement towards "Destalinisation" an amnesty was declared for various political prisoners and this included Starostin. His sentence and those of his brothers were declared illegal, and they were set free. Nikolai was appointed as coach to the Soviet national football team, and in 1955 returned to Spartak as president, a position he maintained until 1992. Starostin published his memoirs, titled Futbol skvoz gody (Football Through the Years) in 1989.

== Honours and awards ==
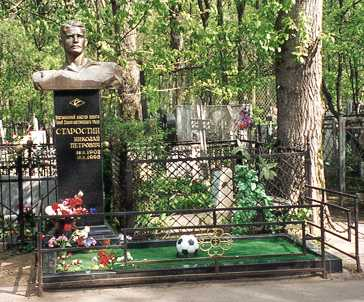
Grave of Nikolai Starostin in Vagankovo Cemetery, Moscow (with its own miniature football pitch).

- Hero of Socialist Labour (1990)
- Order of Merit for the Fatherland, 3rd class (19 April 1995) for services in the development of physical culture and sports and the great personal contribution to the revival and the emergence of the sports society "Spartak"
- Three Orders of Lenin (1937, 1987, 1990)
- Order of Friendship of Peoples (1982)
- Honoured Master of Sports
