= People's Commissariat for Military and Naval Affairs =

Ministry of Defence of the Soviet Government (1923–1934)

People's Commissariat for Military and Naval Affairs of the Soviet Union
- Народный комиссариат по военным и морским делам Советского Союза
- Original emblem

Agency overview
- Formed: November 12, 1923
- Preceding agencies: People's Commissariat for Military Affairs of the Russian Socialist Federative Soviet Republic; People's Commissariat for Maritime Affairs of the Russian Socialist Federative Soviet Republic
- Dissolved: March 15, 1934
- Superseding agency: People's Commissariat of Defense of the Soviet Union
- Jurisdiction: Soviet Union
- Headquarters: Moscow
- Parent department: Council of People's Commissars of the Soviet Union

The People's Commissariat for Military and Naval Affairs of the Soviet Union was the central body of military command and control of the Armed Forces of the Soviet Union from November 12, 1923, to March 15, 1934.

== History ==
The People's Commissariat was formed from two independent People's Commissariats (for Military and for Naval Affairs of the Russian Socialist Federative Soviet Republic). Abolished in connection with the formation of the People's Commissariat of Defense of the Soviet Union.

== People's Commissars ==
The People's Commissariat was headed by the People's Commissar; at various times in this position were:

- Leon Trotsky – November 12, 1923 – January 26, 1925;
- Mikhail Frunze – January 26 – October 31, 1925;
- Kliment Voroshilov – November 6, 1925 – June 20, 1934

== Sources ==
- Chernavin, Vladimir (1990). "People's Commissariat for Military and Naval Affairs". Naval Dictionary. Moscow: Military Publishing House. p. 511. ISBN 5-203-00174-X.
