= Pavel Lazimir =

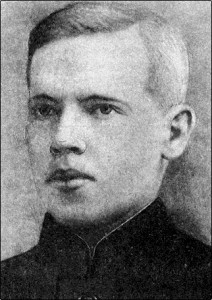
Pavel Lazimir

Pavel Evgen'evich Lazimir (25 June 1891 in Novy Peterhof – 17 May 1920 Kremenchuk) was a Russian revolutionary and Soviet military leader.

A prominent Left Socialist-Revolutionary, he later joined the Bolsheviks and headed a soldier section of the Petrograd Soviet and was the Chairman of the Petrograd Military Revolutionary Committee during the October Revolution. Prior to being elected to the Petrograd Soviet, he served as a feldsher (physician assistant) at the Petrograd military hospital.

He died of typhus in 1920.
