= Vsevobuch =

System of compulsory military training in the Russian SFSR

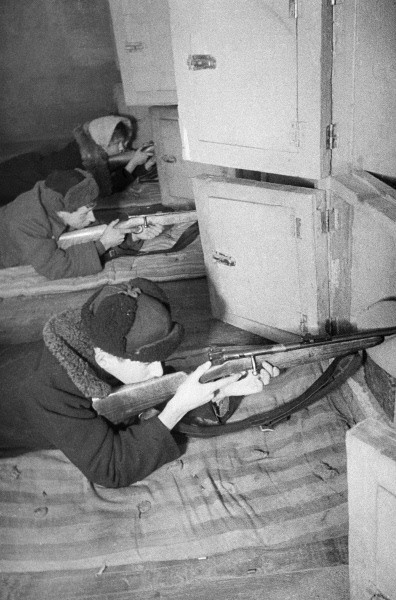
Vsevubuch of the Moscow People's Militia, 1941

Vsevobuch (Russian: всевобуч, IPA: [fsʲɪˈvobʊtɕ]), a portmanteau for "Universal Military Training" (Russian: всеобщее военное обучение, romanized: vseobshcheye voyennoye obucheniye), was a system of compulsory military training for men practiced in the Russian SFSR governed by the Chief Administration of Universal Military Training of the People's Commissariat of Military Affairs.

The first vsevobuch was urged by the 7th Congress of the Bolshevik Party. It took place de jure in March 1918 to fight the remnants of opposition to Soviet rule. Initially Vsevobuch engaged mainly the workers; from that summer, it also took poor peasants. Ippolit Sokolov's Sistema trudovoi gimnastiki was published in 1922. The whole process was canceled in 1923.

Shortly after the opening of the Eastern Front of World War II a decree of the State Defense Committee was issued on September 17, 1941. Named "On Universal Compulsory Military Training of the Citizens of the USSR", it came into force on October 1 of the same year and concerned males between 16 and 50 years old. The document stated that military training should be provided without interruption of the civilian work of the trainees. The Central Department of Vsevobuch was formed within the People's Commissariat of Defense of the Soviet Union.

On 4 March 1942 a 110-hour Vsevobuch military training programme for women was introduced.

It is estimated that the total number who passed through Vsevobuch in 1941–45 was 9,862,000 men.

A 4,550 m (14,930 ft) mountain in Trans-Ili Alatau was named after Vsevobuch.

== See also ==
- All-Union Council on physical culture and sports
- CSKA Moscow
- OSOAVIAKhIM
- Morning Exercises
- Roza Shanina
