= Soviet and communist studies =

Field of historical studies

Soviet and communist studies, or simply Soviet studies, is the field of regional and historical studies on the Soviet Union and other communist states, as well as the history of communism and of the communist parties that existed or still exist in some form in many countries, both inside and outside the former Eastern Bloc, such as the Communist Party USA. Aspects of its historiography have attracted debates between historians on several topics, including totalitarianism and Cold War espionage.

Soviet and Eastern European studies was also a form of area studies that included the study of various aspects of Soviet society, including agriculture, the Council for Mutual Economic Assistance (COMECON), trade relations in the Warsaw Pact, cultural and scientific achievements, nationality policies, Kremlinology, human rights, policies towards religions, imperialism, and collectivisation. The wider field included independent study in universities and academia, as well as some support from the military and intelligence agencies. Major contemporary journals included Soviet Studies (now Europe-Asia Studies), Communisme, Journal of Cold War Studies, Slavic Review, and The Russian Review, among others. After the dissolution of the Soviet Union, the field shifted towards historical studies and began to include comparisons to the post-Soviet years as well as new data from the Soviet archives.

== Historiography ==
The academic field after World War II and during the Cold War was dominated by the "totalitarian model" of the Soviet Union, stressing the absolute nature of Joseph Stalin's power. The "totalitarian model" was first outlined in the 1950s by political scientist Carl Joachim Friedrich, who posited that the Soviet Union and other communist states were totalitarian systems, characterised by personality cult and the almost unlimited powers of the "great leader," such as Stalin.

The "revisionist school," beginning in the 1960s, focused on relatively autonomous institutions that might influence policy at the higher levels. Matt Lenoe describes the "revisionist school" as representing those who "insisted that the old image of the Soviet Union as a totalitarian state bent on world domination was oversimplified or just plain wrong. They tended to be interested in social history and to argue that the Communist Party leadership had had to adjust to social forces." These "revisionist school" historians such as J. Arch Getty and Lynne Viola challenged the "totalitarian model", which was considered to be outdated, and were active in the former communist states' archives, especially the State Archive of the Russian Federation related to the Soviet Union.

Some critics of the totalitarian model, such as Robert C. Tucker, formulated an alternative that also focused on the personality cult of Stalin. Tucker, influenced by George F. Kennan's writings on how the Soviet Union had reverted to a tsarist autocracy, emphasised that the Soviet Union was not guided by socialism or ideology but by the ruling class. This perspective emerged significantly from ideas of neo-Freudian psychoanalysis, evaluating Stalin as a deeply paranoid tyrant and in the process creating a more tsarist-type government. Moshe Lewin cautioned historians not to "over-Stalinise" the whole of Soviet history, while stating that the Soviet Union developed a "propensity for authoritarianism" after Marxian principles had failed to be established. Lewin argued that the Soviet Union recapitulated a "bureaucratic absolutism" almost Prussian in nature, where the "monarch was dependent on his bureaucracy".

Some revisionists also focused on contradictions of the Soviet regime, such as the idea that Soviet elites had betrayed communist ideals by forming top-down apparatuses, as well as demonstrating national chauvinism in oppressive policies or becoming anti-leftist despite the state imagery. One example was David Brandenberger's concept of National Bolshevism, which describe the Stalinist regime's turn against internationalism, with Russian cultural hegemony and xenophobia becoming the main ideological currents from the 1930s. Nikolai Mitrokhin highlighted the ethnocentrism and antisemitism of the CPSU and Moscow administration of the Soviet era.

According to John Earl Haynes and Harvey Klehr, the historiography is characterised by a split between traditionalists and revisionists. "Traditionalists" characterise themselves as objective reporters of what they see as a "totalitarian nature" of communism and communist states. They are criticised by their opponents as being anti-communist in their eagerness to continue to focus on the issues of the Cold War. Alternative characterizations for traditionalists include "anti-Communist", "conservative", "Draperite" (after Theodore Draper), "orthodox", and "right-wing";

Haynes and Klehr argue that "revisionists" categorize all "traditionalists" as conservative to undermine liberal forms of this study, despite the liberal or even left background of many of the founding members of this view on communism, such as Draper and the Cold War liberals. Norman Markowitz, a prominent "revisionist", referred to traditionalists as "reactionaries", "right-wing romantics", and "triumphalists" who belong to the "HUAC school of CPUSA scholarship." Haynes and Klehr criticise some "revisionists" for characterising "traditionalists" as "lowercase" ideological anticommunists (communism in general) rather than anti-Communists (the historically established Communist parties). In their view, "revisionists" such as Joel Kovel imply that "traditionalists" in Communist studies are foremost opposing the establishment of an "ideal" Marxist society, when in practice, traditionalists have criticised the form of "real socialism" that existed in the Soviet system at the time, a form also criticised by many revisionists.

Kovel wrote that the "Soviet system, while nominally communist, was given its hierarchy, exploitation and lack of democracy, neither communist nor even authentically socialist." "Revisionists", characterised by Haynes and Klehr as historical revisionists, are more numerous and dominate academic institutions and learned journals. A suggested alternative formulation is "new historians of American communism", but that has not caught on because these historians would describe themselves as unbiased and scholarly, and contrast their work with that of anti-communist "traditionalists", whom they would term biased and unscholarly.

In Communist studies, post-Soviet access to archives, including Eastern Bloc archives and the Venona project's decrypts, also bolstered traditionalists' view on Cold War intelligence that the CPUSA was subsidised by the Soviet Union, and particularly before the 1950s aiding it in espionage, as well as the knowledge that extensive operations were conducted by atomic spies for the Soviet Union. Daniel Patrick Moynihan, a United States Senator for the Democratic Party who led the Moynihan Commission on Government Secrecy, played a major role in publicising the Venona evidence. Archives have also shed new light on inter-communist rivalries during the Cold War, such as the "Soviet Chinese spy wars" during the Sino–Soviet split.

== Notable debates ==
=== Totalitarianism, revisionism, and the Holodomor ===
J. Arch Getty's Origins of Great Purges, a book published in 1985 in which Getty posits that the Soviet political system was not completely controlled from the center and that Stalin only responded to political events as they arose, was a challenge to works by Robert Conquest and part of the debates between the "totalitarian model" and "revisionist school" of the Soviet Union. In an appendix to the book, Getty also questioned the previously published findings that Stalin organised the murder of Sergey Kirov to justify his campaign of Great Purge. The "totalitarian model" historians objected to the "revisionist school" of historians such as Getty as apologetics for Stalin and accused them of downplaying the Great Terror.

Lenoe responds that "Getty has not denied Stalin's ultimate responsibility for the Terror, nor is he an admirer of Stalin." As the leader of the second generation of the "revisionist school" or "revisionist historians", Sheila Fitzpatrick was the first to call the group of historians working on Soviet history in the 1980s "a new cohort of [revisionist school] historians." Most young "revisionist school" historians did not want to separate the social history of the Soviet Union from the evolution of the political system. Fitzpatrick explained in the 1980s, when the "totalitarian model" was still widely used, "it was very useful to show that the model had an inherent bias and it did not explain everything about Soviet society. Now, whereas a new generation of academics considers sometimes as self-evident that the totalitarian model was completely erroneous and harmful, it is perhaps more useful to show that there were certain things about the Soviet company that it explained very well."

Hannah Arendt, Zbigniew Brzezinski, Conquest, and Carl Joachim Friedrich were prominent advocates of applying the totalitarian concept to a comparison of Nazism and Stalinism. It was considered outdated by the 1980s and in the post-Stalinist era, and is seen as a useful term, but the old 1950s theory about it is defunct among scholars. Fitzpatrick and Michael Geyer criticise the concept and highlight the differences between Nazism and Stalinism. Henry Rousso defends the work of Friedrich et al., noting that the concept is both useful and descriptive rather than analytical, and concludes that the regimes described as totalitarian do not have a common origin and did not arise in similar ways.

Philippe Burrin and Nicholas Werth take a middle position between those who portray Stalin as all-powerful and those who portray him as a weak dictator. Ian Kershaw and Moshe Lewin take a longer historical perspective and regard Nazism and Stalinism not so much as examples of a new type of society, as Arendt, Brzezinski and Friedrich did, but more as historical "anomalies" or unusual deviations from the typical path of development that most industrial societies are expected to follow.

During the debates in the 1980s, the use of émigré sources and the insistence on Stalin's engineering of Kirov's murder became embedded in the two sides' position. In a review of Conquest's work on the Soviet famine of 1932–1933, especially The Harvest of Sorrow, Getty writes that Stalin and the Soviet Politburo played a major role, but "there is plenty of blame to go around. It must be shared by the tens of thousands of activists and officials who carried out the policy and by the peasants who chose to slaughter animals, burn fields, and boycott cultivation in protest."

In an analysis of scholarship surrounding the Ukrainian famine of the 1930s, Jeff Coplon says that allegations by "mainstream academics", including Conquest, of genocide against the Soviet Union were historically dubious and politically motivated as part of a campaign by the Ukrainian nationalist community. In a letter to the editors, Conquest dismissed the article as "error and absurdity."

Michael Ellman states that in the end it all depends on the definition of genocide and that if Stalin was guilty of genocide in the Holodomor, then "[m]any other events of the 1917–53 era (e.g. the deportation of whole nationalities, and the 'national operations' of 1937–38) would also qualify as genocide, as would the acts of [many Western countries]", such as the Atlantic slave trade, the atomic bombings of Hiroshima and Nagasaki, and the sanctions against Iraq in the 1990s, among many others. Historian Hiroaki Kuromiya finds it persuasive.

As summarised by David R. Marples, Conquest's thesis that the famine constituted genocide and was deliberately inflicted is controversial and remains part of the ongoing debates on the Holodomor genocide question. Vladimir N. Brovkin describes it as a challenge to the "revisionist school" of historians, while Alexander Nove states, "Conquest seems prone to accept the Ukrainian nationalist myth." Hiroaki writes that "those who examine the famine from a general Soviet perspective downplay any specific Ukrainian factor, while specialists on Ukraine generally support the concept of a genocidal famine." The most notable work in the field that maintains the famine was not genocide is by R. W. Davies and Stephen G. Wheatcroft, both of whom cite a letter from Conquest stating "he does not believe that Stalin deliberately inflicted the 1933 famine."

Sarah Davies and James Harris write that with the dissolution of the Soviet Union and the release of the Soviet archives, some of the heat has gone out of the debate. A 1993 study of archival data by Getty et al. showed that a total of 1,053,829 people died in the Gulag from 1934 to 1953. Getty and Wheatcroft write that the opening of the Soviet archives has vindicated the lower estimates put forth by the "revisionist school" scholars.

Another major part of the debate involved Soviet nationality policy and Stalin's deportations. Historian Jon Chang argued that many self-declared "social historians", generally falling into the revisionist school, relied almost exclusively on archival sources while neglecting oral history, despite social history officially being focused on the lived experiences of the common people. According to Chang, because of this reliance on Soviet archival sources, "when it came to the Soviet diaspora peoples and the 'nationalities deportations' from 1937 to 1950," some revisionist historians "held that these cases of ethnic cleansing were not racial but ideological in nature, in which both elites and ordinary people could be targeted as 'enemies of the people.'" This subgroup of revisionists sought to recapitulate a "relatively pure" communism in the Soviet Union and explain all of its policies, such as the nationality operations of the NKVD and deportations of Koreans, as a reflection of Marxism.

Eric D. Weitz wrote that, while revisionists on the topic of Soviet deportations "raise the term race, they step around it gingerly and quickly retreat to the safer language of ethnicity and [Soviet] nationality." He added, "The Soviets explicitly and loudly rejected the ideology of race... Yet at the same time, traces of racial politics crept into Soviet nationalities policies, especially between 1937 and 1953. [...] The particular traits could be the source of praise and power, as with Russians, or could lead to round-ups, forced deportations, and resettlement in horrendous conditions."

=== Victims of Stalinism ===
According to J. Arch Getty, over half of the 100 million deaths which are commonly attributed to communism were due to famines. Getty writes that the "overwhelming weight of opinion among scholars working in the new archives is that the terrible famine of the 1930s was the result of Stalinist bungling and rigidity rather than some genocidal plan." As the majority of excess deaths under Joseph Stalin were not direct killings, the exact number of victims of Stalinism is difficult to calculate due to lack of consensus among scholars on which deaths can be attributed to the regime.

Stephen G. Wheatcroft posits that "[t]he Stalinist regime was consequently responsible for about a million purposive killings, and through its criminal neglect and irresponsibility it was probably responsible for the premature deaths of about another two million more victims amongst the repressed population, i.e. in the camps, colonies, prisons, exile, in transit and in the POW camps for Germans. These are clearly much lower figures than those for whom Hitler's regime was responsible." Wheatcroft states that Stalin's "purposive killings" fit more closely into the category of "execution" than "murder", given he thought the accused were indeed guilty of crimes against the state and insisted on documentation. Hitler simply wanted to kill Jews and communists because of who they were, insisted on no documentation and was indifferent to even a pretence of legality for these actions.

Michael Ellman says that "the very category 'victims of Stalinism' is a matter of political judgement." Ellman says that mass deaths from famines are not a "uniquely Stalinist evil", and compares the behaviour of the Stalinist regime vis-à-vis the Holodomor to that of the British Empire (towards Ireland and India) and the G8 in contemporary times. According to Ellman, the latter "are guilty of mass manslaughter or mass deaths from criminal negligence because of their not taking obvious measures to reduce mass deaths" and a possible defence of Stalin and his associates is that "their behaviour was no worse than that of many rulers in the nineteenth and twentieth centuries."

Ellman, Getty, and Wheatcroft in particular, among others, criticized Robert Conquest (Wheatcroft said that Conquest's victim totals for Stalinist repressions are still too high, even in his reassessments) and other historians for relying on hearsay and rumour as evidence, and cautioned that historians should instead utilize archive material. During the debates, Ellman distinguished between historians who based their research on archive materials, and those like Conquest whose estimates were based on witnesses evidence and other unreliable data. Wheatcroft stated that historians relied on Aleksandr Solzhenitsyn to support their estimates of deaths under Stalin in the tens of millions but research in the state archives vindicated the lower estimates, while adding that the popular press has continued to include serious errors that should not be cited, or relied on, in academia.

== Academic journals ==
While this area is now seldom offered as a field of study in itself, in which one might become a specialist, there are related fields emerging, as may be judged by the titles of academic journals, some of which have changed to reflect the passage of time since the fall of communism in the early 1990s and the effects of the end of Soviet rule in Eurasia. These include Communisme, Communist and Post-Communist Studies (previously Communist Affairs), Demokratizatsiya, East European Politics (previously Journal of Communist Studies), East European Politics and Societies, Europe-Asia Studies (previously Soviet Studies), Journal of Cold War Studies, Journal of Contemporary History, Kritika, Post-Soviet Affairs, Problems of Post-Communism (previously Problems of Communism), Slavic Review, The Russian Review, The Slavonic and East European Review, Jane's Intelligence Review (previously Jane's Soviet Intelligence Review), and Studies in East European Thought (previously Studies in Soviet Thought).

The historiography of strictly communist studies is also changing, with different models of its aims and a major shift driven by access to archives. The access to archives, including post-Soviet archives and the Venona project, also bolstered traditionalist views on Soviet espionage in the United States. Printed journals include Jahrbuch für Historische Kommunismusforschung (Yearbook for Historical Communist Studies) and Slavic Review. Other serial publications include the Yearbook on International Communist Affairs (1966–1991) published by the Hoover Institution Press and Stanford University as well as the World Strength of the Communist Party Organizations, an annual report published by the Bureau of Intelligence and Research of the United States Department of State beginning in 1948.

== See also ==
- Bibliography of Stalinism and the Soviet Union
- Bibliography of the post-Stalinist Soviet Union
- Communist nostalgia
  - Nostalgia for the German Democratic Republic
  - Nostalgia for the Polish People's Republic
  - Nostalgia for the Socialist Federal Republic of Yugoslavia
  - Nostalgia for the Soviet Union
- Historiography of the Cold War
- Russian studies
- Post-communism
- Post-Soviet studies
