= Bibliography of Russian and Soviet science: Life sciences =

Bibliography of works about the life sciences in Russian and the Soviet Union

This is a select bibliography of academic level English language books (including translations) and journal articles, published mainly post World War II, (Note: works published during or before World War II should be limited to areas where there is no significant post World War II books on the subject or when the work in question has significant historical merit.) about the history of the life sciences in Russia and the Soviet Union.

For other areas of science, please see:

Works listed here are cited in the notes or bibliographies of scholarly sources. Each is published by an academic or major press, written by a recognized expert, or substantially reviewed in scholarly journals; borderline cases are omitted. A selection of primary sources are included. Many of the books below carry their own bibliographies; see the Further reading section for other bibliographies, and the External links section for historical sites, academic sites, and museums.

Citations follow APA style. (Note: Entries are in plain text APA 7 format without templates; templates are used only for reviews and notes.) Book have citations to academic journal or mainstream published reviews when available. For books only partly about the subject, relevant chapter or section titles are provided when useful and available. Translators of the original-language edition are included when possible. In cases where a title or name has appeared with more than one English spelling, the most recent published form is used and a footnote documents any earlier title under which the work appeared.

== Biology ==
- Adams, M. B. (Ed.). (1990). The Wellborn Science: Eugenics in Germany, France, Brazil, and Russia. Oxford University Press.
- Falk, R., & Lazcano, A. (2012). The forgotten dispute: A.I. Oparin and H.J. Muller on the origin of life. History and Philosophy of the Life Sciences, 34(3), 373–390.
- Graham, L. R. (1987). Science, Philosophy, and Human Behavior in the Soviet Union. Columbia University Press.
- Joravsky, D. (1959). Soviet Marxism and biology before Lysenko. Journal of the History of Ideas, 20(1), 85–104.
- Krementsov, N. (2011). A Martian Stranded on Earth: Alexander Bogdanov, Blood Transfusions, and Proletarian Science. University of Chicago Press.
- Krementsov, N. (2014). Revolutionary Experiments: The Quest for Immortality in Bolshevik Science and Fiction. Oxford University Press.
- Martin, B. (2023). A crusade in Soviet biology. In Roy and Zhores Medvedev: Loyal dissent in the Soviet Union (pp. 16–31). Academic Studies Press.
- Oldfield, J. D., & Shaw, D. J. B. (2013). V. I. Vernadskii and the development of biogeochemical understandings of the biosphere, c.1880s–1968. The British Journal for the History of Science, 46(2), 287–310.
- Todes, D. P. (1989). Darwin Without Malthus: The Struggle for Existence in Russian Evolutionary Thought. Oxford University Press.
- Todes, D. P. (1997). Pavlov's physiology factory. Isis, 88(2), 205–246.
- Weiner, D. R. (1988). Models of Nature: Ecology, Conservation, and Cultural Revolution in Soviet Russia. Indiana University Press.
- Yurchak, A. (2019). Communist proteins: Lenin's skin, astrobiology, and the origin of life. Kritika: Explorations in Russian and Eurasian History, 20(4), 683–715.

=== Biological weapons ===
- See Bibliography of Russian and Soviet science (Technology) § Biological weapons

=== Darwinism and Russian Evolutionary Thought ===
- Rogers, J. A. (1965). Marxist and Russian Darwinism. Jahrbücher für Geschichte Osteuropas, 13(2), 199–211.
- Rogers, J. A. (1973). The reception of Darwin's Origin of Species by Russian scientists. Isis, 64(4), 484–503.
- Rogers, J. A. (1974). Russian opposition to Darwinism in the nineteenth century. Isis, 65(4), 487–505.
- Voerkelius, M. (2025). Darwinism and the human-animal boundary in the Soviet Union. Kritika: Explorations in Russian and Eurasian History, 26(1), 35–61.

=== Genetics and Lysenkoism ===
- Adams, M. B. (Ed.). (1990). The Wellborn Science: Eugenics in Germany, France, Brazil, and Russia. Oxford University Press.
- Caspari, E. W., & Marshak, R. E. (1965). The rise and fall of Lysenko. Science, 149(3681), 275–278.
- deJong-Lambert, W. (2012). Lysenkoism in Poland. Journal of the History of Biology, 45(3), 499–524.
- deJong-Lambert, W. (2012). The Cold War Politics of Genetic Research: An Introduction to the Lysenko Affair. Springer.
- deJong-Lambert, W. (2013). Hermann J. Muller, Theodosius Dobzhansky, Leslie Clarence Dunn, and the reaction to Lysenkoism in the United States. Journal of Cold War Studies, 15(1), 78–118.
- deJong-Lambert, W., & Krementsov, N. (Eds.). (2017). The Lysenko Controversy as a Global Phenomenon (2 vols.). Palgrave Macmillan.
- Duančić, V. (2020). Lysenko in Yugoslavia, 1945–1950s: How to de-Stalinize Stalinist science. Journal of the History of Biology, 53(1), 159–194.
- Gordin, M. D. (2012). How Lysenkoism became pseudoscience: Dobzhansky to Velikovsky. Journal of the History of Biology, 45(3), 443–468.
- Gordin, M. D. (2018). Lysenko unemployed: Soviet genetics after the aftermath. Isis, 109(1), 56–78.
- Graham, L. R. (2016). Lysenko's Ghost: Epigenetics and Russia. Harvard University Press.
- Harman, O. S. (2003). C. D. Darlington and the British and American reaction to Lysenko and the Soviet conception of science. Journal of the History of Biology, 36(2), 309–352.
- Iida, K. (2015). A controversial idea as a cultural resource: The Lysenko controversy and discussions of genetics as a "democratic" science in postwar Japan. Social Studies of Science, 45(4), 546–569.
- Jones, G. (1979). British scientists, Lysenko and the Cold War. Economy and Society, 8(1), 26–58.
- Joravsky, D. (1962). The Lysenko affair. Scientific American, 207(5), 41–49.
- Joravsky, D. (1970). The Lysenko Affair. Harvard University Press.
- Kneen, P. (1998). Physics, genetics and the Zhdanovshchina. Europe-Asia Studies, 50(7), 1183–1202.
- Konashev, M. (2020). Soviet genetics and the communist party: Was it all bad and wrong, or none at all?. History and Philosophy of the Life Sciences, 42(2), 1–19.
- Krementsov, N. (1996). A "second front" in Soviet genetics: The international dimension of the Lysenko controversy, 1944–1947. Journal of the History of Biology, 29(2), 229–250.
- Lecourt, D. (1977). Proletarian Science? The Case of Lysenko. New Left Books.
- Medvedev, Z. A. (1969). The Rise and Fall of T. D. Lysenko. Columbia University Press.
- Mikulak, M. W. (1970). Darwinism, Soviet genetics, and Marxism-Leninism. Journal of the History of Ideas, 31(3), 359–376.
- Muller, H. J. (1951). Science in bondage. Science, 113(2924), 25–29.
- Prenant, M., & Levy, J. (1948). The genetics controversy. Science & Society, 13(1), 50–78.
- Pringle, P. (2008). The Murder of Nikolai Vavilov: The Story of Stalin's Persecution of One of the Great Scientists of the Twentieth Century. Simon & Schuster.
- Roll-Hansen, N. (2005). The Lysenko Effect: The Politics of Science. Humanity Books.
- Roll-Hansen, N. (2008). Wishful science: The persistence of T. D. Lysenko's agrobiology in the politics of science. Osiris, 23(1), 166–188.
- Rossianov, K. O. (1994). Stalin as Lysenko's editor: Reshaping political discourse in Soviet science. Russian History, 21(1), 49–63.
- Schandevyl, E. (2003). Soviet biology, scientific ethos and political engagement: Belgian university professors and the Lysenko case. Journal of Communist Studies and Transition Politics, 19(2), 93–107.
- Soyfer, V. N. (1994). Lysenko and the Tragedy of Soviet Science. Rutgers University Press.

== Botany and Agriculture ==
- Bakhteev, F. Kh., & Dickson, J. G. (1960). To the history of Russian science: Academician Nicholas Ivanovich Vavilov on his 70th anniversary (November 26, 1887 – August 2, 1942). The Quarterly Review of Biology, 35(2), 115–119.
- Brain, S. (2010). The Great Stalin Plan for the Transformation of Nature. Environmental History, 15(4), 670–700.
- Davidian, G., Ivanov, N., & Lekhnovich, V. (1977). Pyotr Mikhailovich Zhukovskii: A distinguished Soviet scholar and plant scientist. Economic Botany, 31(4), 432–435.
- Fitzgerald, D. (1996). Blinded by technology: American agriculture in the Soviet Union, 1928–1932. Agricultural History, 70(3), 459–486.
- Moon, D. (2013). The Plough That Broke the Steppes: Agriculture and Environment on Russia's Grasslands, 1700–1914. Oxford University Press.
- Nabhan, G. P. (2009). Where Our Food Comes From: Retracing Nikolay Vavilov's Quest to End Famine. Island Press.
- Schönfelder, T. (2022). The good, the bad, and the pochvoved: Viktor Kovda, Soviet soil science, and the agromeliorative complex. Cahiers du Monde russe, 63(1), 59–80.
- Vavilov, N. I. (1992). Origin and Geography of Cultivated Plants (D. Löve, Trans.). Cambridge University Press. (Original work published 1926–1940)

== Huamn Biology, Medicine, Public health, and Anthropology ==
=== Medicine and Public Health ===
- Bernstein, F. L., Burton, C., & Healey, D. (Eds.). (2010). Soviet Medicine: Culture, Practice, and Science. Northern Illinois University Press.
- Conroy, M. S. (1998). Pharmacy in Soviet Russia before the Great Patriotic War (1941–45). Pharmacy in History, 40(1), 3–24.
- Conroy, M. S. (2004). Russian-American pharmaceutical relations, 1900–1945. Pharmacy in History, 46(4), 143–166.
- Conroy, M. S. (2004). The Soviet pharmaceutical industry and dispensing, 1945–1953. Europe-Asia Studies, 56(7), 963–991.
- Graham, L. R. (1977). Science and values: The eugenics movement in Germany and Russia in the 1920s. The American Historical Review, 82(5), 1133–1164.
- Gray, J. A. (Ed.). (1964). Pavlov's Typology: Recent Theoretical and Experimental Developments from the Laboratory of B. M. Teplov. Pergamon Press.
- Haber, M. (2013). Concealing labor pain: The evil eye and the psychoprophylactic method of painless childbirth in Soviet Russia. Kritika: Explorations in Russian and Eurasian History, 14(3), 535–559.
- Hastings, A. B., & Shimkin, M. B. (1946). Medical research mission to the Soviet Union. Science, 103(2681), 605–608.
- Henderson, D. J. (1968). Soviet medicine. Canadian Journal of Public Health, 59(3), 105–110.
- Hutchinson, J. F. (1990). Politics and Public Health in Revolutionary Russia, 1890–1918. Johns Hopkins University Press.
- Joravsky, D. (1977). The mechanical spirit: The Stalinist marriage of Pavlov to Marx. Theory and Society, 4(4), 457–477.
- Krementsov, N. (2002). The Cure: A Story of Cancer and Politics from the Annals of the Cold War. University of Chicago Press.
- Krementsov, N. (2008). Hormones and the Bolsheviks: From organotherapy to experimental endocrinology, 1918–1929. Isis, 99(3), 486–518.
- Michaels, P. A. (2000). Medical propaganda and cultural revolution in Soviet Kazakhstan, 1928–41. The Russian Review, 59(2), 159–178.
- Michaels, P. A. (2003). Curative Powers: Medicine and Empire in Stalin's Central Asia. University of Pittsburgh Press.
- Mudd, S. (1947). Recent observations on programs for medicine and national health in the USSR. Proceedings of the American Philosophical Society, 91(2), 181–188.
- Roemer, M. I. (1962). Highlights of Soviet health services. The Milbank Memorial Fund Quarterly, 40(4), 373–406.
- Semashko, N. A. (1946). Friedrich Erismann: The dawn of Russian hygiene and public health. Bulletin of the History of Medicine, 20(1), 1–9.
- Sigerist, H. E. (1937). Socialized Medicine in the Soviet Union. W. W. Norton.
- Solomon, S. G. (1990). Social hygiene in Soviet medical education, 1922–30. Journal of the History of Medicine and Allied Sciences, 45(4), 607–643.
- Solomon, S. G. (2003). Knowing the "local": Rockefeller Foundation officers' site visits to Russia in the 1920s. Slavic Review, 62(4), 710–732.
- Solomon, S. G. (Ed.). (2006). Doing Medicine Together: Germany and Russia Between the Wars. University of Toronto Press.
- Solomon, S. G., & Hutchinson, J. F. (Eds.). (1990). Health and Society in Revolutionary Russia. Indiana University Press.
- Solomon, S. G., & Krementsov, N. (2001). Giving and taking across borders: The Rockefeller Foundation and Russia, 1919–1928. Minerva, 39(3), 265–298.
- Starks, T. (2008). The Body Soviet: Propaganda, Hygiene, and the Revolutionary State. University of Wisconsin Press.
- Todes, D. P. (2002). Pavlov's Physiology Factory: Experiment, Interpretation, Laboratory Enterprise. Johns Hopkins University Press.
- Todes, D. P. (2014). Ivan Pavlov: A Russian Life in Science. Oxford University Press.

=== Psychiatry, Psychology, and Sexuality ===
- Alexander, R. (2018). Soviet legal and criminological debates on the decriminalization of homosexuality (1965–75). Slavic Review, 77(1), 30–52.
- Beer, D. (2004). The medicalization of religious deviance in the Russian Orthodox Church (1880–1905). Kritika: Explorations in Russian and Eurasian History, 5(3), 451–482.
- Berman, H. J., & Hunt, D. H. (1950). Criminal law and psychiatry: The Soviet solution. Stanford Law Review, 2(4), 635–663.
- Bernstein, F. L. (1998). Envisioning health in revolutionary Russia: The politics of gender in sexual-enlightenment posters of the 1920s. The Russian Review, 57(2), 191–217.
- Bloch, S., & Reddaway, P. (1977). Psychiatric Terror: How Soviet Psychiatry Is Used to Suppress Dissent. Basic Books.
- Cohen, S. (2015). Humanizing Soviet communication: Social-psychological training in the late socialist period. Slavic Review, 74(3), 439–463.
- Dufaud, G., & Rzesnitzek, L. (2016). Soviet psychiatry through the prism of circulation: The case of outpatient psychiatry in the interwar period. Kritika: Explorations in Russian and Eurasian History, 17(4), 781–803.
- Engelstein, L. (1992). The Keys to Happiness: Sex and the Search for Modernity in Fin-de-Siècle Russia. Cornell University Press.
- Etkind, A. (1997). Eros of the Impossible: The History of Psychoanalysis in Russia (N. Rubins & M. Rubins, Trans.). Westview Press.
- Fürst, J. (2018). Liberating madness – punishing insanity: Soviet hippies and the politics of craziness. Journal of Contemporary History, 53(4), 832–860.
- Gindis, B. (1992). Profession of psychology and "perestroika" in the Soviet Union. Political Psychology, 13(4), 771–777.
- Healey, D. (2001). Homosexual Desire in Revolutionary Russia: The Regulation of Sexual and Gender Dissent. University of Chicago Press.
- Joravsky, D. (1989). Russian Psychology: A Critical History. Basil Blackwell.
- Matza, T. (2018). Shock Therapy: Psychology, Precarity, and Well-Being in Postsocialist Russia. Duke University Press.
- McDonald, G. J. (2022). Marxism, psychology, and the Soviet mind. Kritika: Explorations in Russian and Eurasian History, 23(1), 145–158.
- Miller, M. A. (1985). Freudian theory under Bolshevik rule: The theoretical controversy during the 1920s. Slavic Review, 44(4), 625–646.
- Miller, M. A. (1998). Freud and the Bolsheviks: Psychoanalysis in Imperial Russia and the Soviet Union. Yale University Press.
- Neznanov, N. G., Akimenko, M. A., & Yankina, N. (2005). Development of a biopsychosocial concept of disease at the V. M. Bekhterev Institute in the twentieth century. International Journal of Mental Health, 34(4), 4–10.
- Ovsyannikov, S. A., & Ovsyannikov, A. S. (2007). Sergey S. Korsakov and the beginning of Russian psychiatry. Journal of the History of the Neurosciences, 16(1–2), 58–64.
- Panova, E. L., & Lanska, D. J. (2021). Western European influence on the development of Russian neurology and psychiatry, part 1: Western European tours of early Russian neurologists and psychiatrists. Journal of the History of the Neurosciences, 30(3), 223–251.
- Razran, G. (1957). Soviet psychology since 1950. Science, 126(3283), 1100–1107.
- Razran, G. (1958). Soviet psychology and psychophysiology. Science, 128(3333), 1187–1194.
- Razran, G. (1978). Systematic psychology and dialectical materialism: A Soviet story with non-Soviet imports. Behaviorism, 6(1), 81–126.
- Reich, R. (2014). Inside the psychiatric word: Diagnosis and self-definition in the late Soviet period. Slavic Review, 73(3), 563–584.
- Sirotkina, I. (2002). Diagnosing Literary Genius: A Cultural History of Psychiatry in Russia, 1880–1930. Johns Hopkins University Press.
- Sirotkina, I. (2007). Mental hygiene for geniuses: Psychiatry in the early Soviet years. Journal of the History of the Neurosciences, 16(1–2), 150–159.
- Solso, R. L. (1991). The Institute of Psychology, USSR: A 20-year retrospective. Psychological Science, 2(5), 312–320.
- Wanke, P. (2003). 'Inevitably every man has his threshold': Soviet military psychiatry during World War II — a comparative approach. The Journal of Slavic Military Studies, 16(1), 84–104.
- Zajicek, B. (2017). Banning the Soviet lobotomy: Psychiatry, ethics, and professional politics during late Stalinism. Bulletin of the History of Medicine, 91(1), 33–61.

== Environmental and Earth Sciences ==
For works about Geology, see Bibliography of Russian and Soviet science (Physical sciences)#Geology.

- Bassin, M. (1992). Geographical determinism in fin-de-siècle Marxism: Georgii Plekhanov and the environmental basis of Russian history. Annals of the Association of American Geographers, 82(1), 3–22.
- Bonhomme, B. (2002). A revolution in the forests? Forest conservation in Soviet Russia, 1917–1925. Environmental History, 7(3), 411–434.
- Brain, S. (2010). Stalin's environmentalism. The Russian Review, 69(1), 93–118.
- Brain, S. (2011). Song of the Forest: Russian Forestry and Stalinist Environmentalism, 1905–1953. University of Pittsburgh Press.
- Breyfogle, N. B. (Ed.). (2018). Eurasian Environments: Nature and Ecology in Imperial Russian and Soviet History. University of Pittsburgh Press.
- Bruno, A. (2016). A Eurasian mineralogy: Aleksandr Fersman's conception of the natural world. Isis, 107(3), 518–539.
- Conterio, J. (2015). Inventing the subtropics: An environmental history of Sochi, 1929–36. Kritika: Explorations in Russian and Eurasian History, 16(1), 91–120.
- Elie, M. (2013). Coping with the "Black Dragon": Mudflow hazards and the controversy over the Medeo Dam in Kazakhstan, 1958–66. Kritika: Explorations in Russian and Eurasian History, 14(2), 313–342.
- Feshbach, M., & Friendly, A., Jr. (1992). Ecocide in the USSR: Health and Nature Under Siege. Basic Books.
- Ghilarov, A. M. (1995). Vernadsky's biosphere concept: An historical perspective. The Quarterly Review of Biology, 70(2), 193–203.
- Josephson, P. (2017). Stalin's water workers and their heritage: Industrialising nature in Russia, 1950–present. Global Environment, 10(1), 168–201.
- Josephson, P. R. (2002). Industrialized Nature: Brute Force Technology and the Transformation of the Natural World. Island Press.
- Josephson, P. R. (2014). The Conquest of the Russian Arctic. Harvard University Press.
- Josephson, P., Dronin, N., Mnatsakanian, R., Cherp, A., Efremenko, D., & Larin, V. (2013). An Environmental History of Russia. Cambridge University Press.
- Mandel, W. M. (1972). The Soviet ecology movement. Science & Society, 36(4), 385–416.
- Moon, D. (2015). The steppe as fertile ground for innovation in conceptualizing human–nature relationships. The Slavonic and East European Review, 93(1), 16–38.
- Oldfield, J. D. (2005). Russian Nature: Exploring the Environmental Consequences of Societal Change. Ashgate.
- Oldfield, J. D., & Shaw, D. J. B. (2016). The Development of Russian Environmental Thought: Scientific and Geographical Perspectives on the Natural Environment. Routledge.
- Oldfield, J., Lajus, J., & Shaw, D. J. B. (2015). Conceptualizing and utilizing the natural environment: Critical reflections from Imperial and Soviet Russia. The Slavonic and East European Review, 93(1), 1–15.
- Shaw, D. J. B. (2015). Mastering nature through science: Soviet geographers and the Great Stalin Plan for the Transformation of Nature, 1948–53. The Slavonic and East European Review, 93(1), 120–146.
- Shaw, D. J. B., & Oldfield, J. D. (2007). Landscape science: A Russian geographical tradition. Annals of the Association of American Geographers, 97(1), 111–126.
- Weiner, D. R. (1982). The historical origins of Soviet environmentalism. Environmental Review, 6(2), 42–62.
- Weiner, D. R. (1988). Models of Nature: Ecology, Conservation, and Cultural Revolution in Soviet Russia. Indiana University Press.
- Weiner, D. R. (1999). A Little Corner of Freedom: Russian Nature Protection from Stalin to Gorbachev. University of California Press.

== Academic journals ==
Very few journals are dedicated specifically to the history of science and technology in Russia and the Soviet Union; the specialist journal is listed first, followed by general history of science and technology journals and Russian, Soviet, and Slavic studies journals that regularly publish work in this field.

Specialist journal

- Voprosy istorii estestvoznaniia i tekhniki (VIET; Studies in the History of Science and Technology). Institute for the History of Science and Technology, Russian Academy of Sciences (1980–present). ISSN 0205-9606. [In Russian, with English abstracts.]

History of science, technology, and medicine

- Isis. University of Chicago Press for the History of Science Society.
- Technology and Culture. Johns Hopkins University Press for the Society for the History of Technology.
- History and Technology. Taylor & Francis.
- Annals of Science. Taylor & Francis.
- British Journal for the History of Science. Cambridge University Press for the British Society for the History of Science.
- Historical Studies in the Natural Sciences. University of California Press.
- IEEE Annals of the History of Computing. IEEE Computer Society.

Russian, Soviet, and Slavic studies

- Kritika: Explorations in Russian and Eurasian History. Slavica Publishers.
- Slavic Review. Cambridge University Press for the Association for Slavic, East European, and Eurasian Studies.
- The Russian Review. Wiley.
- Russian History. Brill.
- Europe-Asia Studies. Taylor & Francis.
- Russian Studies in History. Taylor & Francis.

== See also ==
- Bibliography of Russian history
- Bibliography of the Soviet Union
