= Bibliography of Russian and Soviet science: Physical sciences =

Bibliography of works about the physical sciences in Russian and the Soviet Union

This is a select bibliography of academic level English language books (including translations) and journal articles, published mainly post World War II, (Note: works published during or before World War II should be limited to areas where there is no significant post World War II books on the subject or when the work in question has significant historical merit.) about the history of the physical sciences in Russia and the Soviet Union.

For other areas of science, please see:

Works listed here are cited in the notes or bibliographies of scholarly sources. Each is published by an academic or major press, written by a recognized expert, or substantially reviewed in scholarly journals; borderline cases are omitted. A selection of primary sources are included. Many of the books below carry their own bibliographies; see the Further reading section for other bibliographies, and the External links section for historical sites, academic sites, and museums.

Citations follow APA style. (Note: Entries are in plain text APA 7 format without templates; templates are used only for reviews and notes.) Book have citations to academic journal or mainstream published reviews when available. For books only partly about the subject, relevant chapter or section titles are provided when useful and available. Translators of the original-language edition are included when possible. In cases where a title or name has appeared with more than one English spelling, the most recent published form is used and a footnote documents any earlier title under which the work appeared.

== Physics ==
For works on nuclear weapons, see the section on Nuclear weapons. For works on nuclear power, see the section on Nuclear Accidents and Chernobyl.

- Akhundov, M. D. (2005). Social influence on physics and mathematics: Local or attributive?. Journal for General Philosophy of Science, 36(1), 135–149.
- Cross, A. (1991). The crisis in physics: Dialectical materialism and quantum theory. Social Studies of Science, 21(4), 735–759.
- Gorelik, G. E., & Frenkel, V. Ya. (1994). Matvei Petrovich Bronstein and Soviet Theoretical Physics in the Thirties (V. M. Levina, Trans.). Birkhäuser. (Original work published 1990)
- Guth, S., Lüscher, F., & Richers, J. (2018). Nuclear technopolitics in the Soviet Union and beyond—An introduction. Jahrbücher für Geschichte Osteuropas, 66(1), 3–19.
- Holloway, D. (1999). Physics, the state, and civil society in the Soviet Union. Historical Studies in the Physical and Biological Sciences, 30(1), 173–192.
- Josephson, P. R. (1991). Physics and Politics in Revolutionary Russia. University of California Press.
- Josephson, P. R. (2022). Nuclear Russia: The Atom in Russian Politics and Culture. Bloomsbury.
- Josephson, P., & Sorokin, A. (2017). Physics moves to the provinces: The Siberian physics community and Soviet power, 1917–1940. The British Journal for the History of Science, 50(2), 297–327.
- Kneen, P. (1998). Physics, genetics and the Zhdanovshchina. Europe-Asia Studies, 50(7), 1183–1202.
- Kojevnikov, A. (2004). Stalin's Great Science: The Times and Adventures of Soviet Physicists. Imperial College Press.
- Lukishova, S. G., Masalov, A. V., & Zadkov, V. N. (2021). Icons of Russian physics: From the Lebedev Scientific School in Physics to the Lebedev Physical Institute. Contemporary Physics, 62(1), 1–13.
- Sakharov, A. (1990). Memoirs (R. Lourie, Trans.). Alfred A. Knopf.
- Suvorova, O. (2021). Rutherford and Russian physics: The critical influence of the human factor. Journal of the Royal Society of New Zealand, 51(3), 467–488.
- Tropp, E. A., Frenkel, V. Ya., & Chernin, A. D. (1993). Alexander A. Friedmann: The Man Who Made the Universe Expand (A. Dron & M. Burov, Trans.). Cambridge University Press.
- Turchetti, S. (2012). The Pontecorvo Affair: A Cold War Defection and Nuclear Physics. University of Chicago Press.

=== Nuclear Accidents and Chernobyl ===
A full bibliography of the Chernobyl disaster can be found at Bibliography of Ukrainian history#Chernobyl. Works on Chernobyl are not included here.

- Bradley, D. J. (1997). Behind the nuclear curtain: Radioactive waste management in the former Soviet Union. Battelle Press.
- Brown, K. (2013). Plutopia: Nuclear families, atomic cities, and the great Soviet and American plutonium disasters. Oxford University Press.
- Egorov, N. N., Novikov, V. M., Parker, F. L., & Popov, V. K. (2000). The radiation legacy of the Soviet nuclear complex: An analytical overview. Earthscan.
- Fairlie, I. (2007). Dispersal, deposition and collective doses after the Chernobyl disaster. Medicine, Conflict and Survival, 23(1), 10–30.
- Huchthausen, P. A., Kurdin, I., & White, R. A. (1997). Hostile waters. St. Martin's Press.
- Josephson, P. R. (1999). Red atom: Russia's nuclear power program from Stalin to today. W. H. Freeman.
- Kapitza, S. P. (1993). Lessons of Chernobyl: The cultural causes of the meltdown. Foreign Affairs, 72(3), 7–11.
- Kasperski, T. (2019). From legacy to heritage: The changing political and symbolic status of military nuclear waste in Russia. Cahiers du Monde russe, 60(2/3), 517–538.
- Komarova, G. (2000). Ethnic behaviour under conditions of high radiation. Inner Asia, 2(1), 63–72.
- Medvedev, Z. A. (1979). Nuclear disaster in the Urals (G. Saunders, Trans.). W. W. Norton.
- Plokhy, S. (2022). Atoms and ashes: A global history of nuclear disasters. W. W. Norton.
- Schmid, S. D. (2015). Producing power: The pre-Chernobyl history of the Soviet nuclear industry. MIT Press.
- Sembritzki, L. (2018). Maiak 1957 and its aftermath: Radiation knowledge and ignorance in the Soviet Union. Jahrbücher für Geschichte Osteuropas, 66(1), 45–64.
- Stratton, W., Stillman, D., Barr, S., & Agnew, H. (1979). Are portions of the Urals really contaminated?. Science, 206(4417), 423–425.
- Trabalka, J. R., Eyman, L. D., & Auerbach, S. I. (1980). Analysis of the 1957–1958 Soviet nuclear accident. Science, 209(4454), 345–353.
- Trabalka, J. R., Eyman, L. D., Auerbach, S. I., & Medvedev, Z. A. (1982). Radioactivity in the Urals. Science, 217(4556), 198, 200.
- Woodwell, G. M. (1986). Chernobyl: A technology that failed. Issues in Science and Technology, 3(1), 30–31, 33–35.

=== Nuclear weapons ===
- See Bibliography of Russian and Soviet science (Military technology) § Nuclear weapons

== Chemistry ==
- Brooks, N. M. (1995). Russian chemistry in the 1850s: A failed attempt at institutionalization. Annals of Science, 52(6), 577–589.
- Brooks, N. M. (2005). Growing links between chemistry and industry in Russia and the Soviet Union, 1900–1953. Ambix, 52(1), 27–43.
- Chatt, J., & Rybinskaya, M. I. (1983). Aleksandr Nikolaevich Nesmeyanov. 9 September 1899–17 January 1980. Biographical Memoirs of Fellows of the Royal Society, 29, 399–480.
- Druzhinin, P. A. (2020). The first publication of Mendeleev's periodic system of elements: A new chronology. Historical Studies in the Natural Sciences, 50(1/2), 129–182.
- Gordin, M. D. (2004). A Well-Ordered Thing: Dmitrii Mendeleev and the Shadow of the Periodic Table. Basic Books.
- Gordin, M. D. (2001). Loose and baggy spirits: Reading Dostoevskii and Mendeleev. Slavic Review, 60(4), 756–780.
- Gordin, M. D. (2018). Paper tools and periodic tables: Newlands and Mendeleev draw grids. Ambix, 65(1), 30–51.
- Graham, L. R. (1964). A Soviet Marxist view of structural chemistry: The theory of resonance controversy. Isis, 55(1), 20–31.
- Jensen, W. B. (Ed.). (2005). Mendeleev on the Periodic Law: Selected Writings, 1869–1905. Dover Publications.
- Kaji, M., Kragh, H., & Palló, G. (Eds.). (2015). Early Responses to the Periodic System. Oxford University Press.
- Lewis, D. E. (2012). Early Russian Organic Chemists and Their Legacy. Springer.
- Oldfield, J. D., & Shaw, D. J. B. (2013). V. I. Vernadskii and the development of biogeochemical understandings of the biosphere, c.1880s–1968. The British Journal for the History of Science, 46(2), 287–310.
- Rocke, A. J. (1981). Kekulé, Butlerov, and the historiography of the theory of chemical structure. The British Journal for the History of Science, 14(1), 27–57.
- Scerri, E. R. (2007). The Periodic Table: Its Story and Its Significance. Oxford University Press.
- Vinogradov, A., & Petriashin, S. (2018). Chemical industry, the environment, and Russian provincial society: The case of the Kokshan Chemical Works (1850–1925). Ambix, 65(2), 143–168.
- Zaitseva, E. A., & Homburg, E. (2005). Catalytic chemistry under Stalin: Science and scientists in times of repression. Ambix, 52(1), 45–65.

=== Chemical weapons ===
- See Bibliography of Russian and Soviet science (Military technology) § Chemical weapons

== Astronomy and Cosmology ==
- Dvoichenko-Markov, E. (1952). The Pulkovo Observatory and some American astronomers of the mid-19th century. Isis, 43(3), 243–246.
- McCutcheon, R. A. (1991). The 1936–1937 purge of Soviet astronomers. Slavic Review, 50(1), 100–117.
- Naan, G. I. (1963). On the infinity of the universe. Science & Society, 27(2), 176–202.
- Rudnitskij, G. M. (2006). I.S. Shklovsky and modern radio astronomy. Astronomical and Astrophysical Transactions, 25(5), 363–368.
- Tropp, E. A., Frenkel, V. Ya., & Chernin, A. D. (1993). Alexander A. Friedmann: The Man Who Made the Universe Expand (A. Dron & M. Burov, Trans.). Cambridge University Press.
- Vucinich, A. (2001). Einstein and Soviet Ideology. Stanford University Press.

== Anthropology ==
- Alymov, S., & Sokolovskiy, S. (2018). Russia, anthropology in. In H. Callan (Ed.), The international encyclopedia of anthropology (pp. 5306–5322). Wiley-Blackwell. doi:10.1002/9781118924396.wbiea2360
- Bunak, V. V., Debets, G. F., & Levin, M. G. (1960). Contributions to the physical anthropology of the Soviet Union (Russian Translation Series of the Peabody Museum of Archaeology and Ethnology, Vol. 1, No. 2). Peabody Museum.
- Field, H. (1946). Anthropology in the Soviet Union, 1945. American Anthropologist, 48(3), 375–396. doi:10.1525/aa.1946.48.3.02a00030
- Field, H. (1948). Contributions to the anthropology of the Soviet Union (Smithsonian Miscellaneous Collections, Vol. 110, No. 13). Smithsonian Institution.
- Krivosheina, G. (2014). Long way to the anthropological exhibition: The institutionalization of physical anthropology in Russia. Centaurus, 56(4), 275–304. doi:10.1111/1600-0498.12072
- Mogilner, M. (2013). Homo imperii: A history of physical anthropology in Russia. University of Nebraska Press.
- Mogilner, M. (2020). The science of empire: Darwinism, human diversity, and Russian physical anthropology. Berichte zur Wissenschaftsgeschichte, 43(1), 96–118. doi:10.1002/bewi.201900020
- Moiseyev, V., Buzhilova, A., & Murphy, E. M. (2018). From the time of Tsar Peter the Great to modern Russia: The development of physical anthropology and bioarchaeology. In B. O'Donnabhain & M. C. Lozada (Eds.), Archaeological human remains: Legacies of imperialism, communism and colonialism (pp. 127–140). Springer. doi:10.1007/978-3-319-89984-8_9

=== Race science, eugenics, and political anthropology ===
- Adams, M. B. (Ed.). (1990). The wellborn science: Eugenics in Germany, France, Brazil, and Russia. Oxford University Press.
- Black, L. T. (1977). The concept of race in Soviet anthropology. Studies in Soviet Thought, 17(1), 1–27. doi:10.1007/BF01045694
- Graham, L. R. (1977). Science and values: The eugenics movement in Germany and Russia in the 1920s. The American Historical Review, 82(5), 1133–1164. JSTOR 1856342
- Krementsov, N. (2010). Eugenics in Russia and the Soviet Union. In A. Bashford & P. Levine (Eds.), The Oxford handbook of the history of eugenics (pp. 413–429). Oxford University Press. doi:10.1093/oxfordhb/9780195373141.013.0025
- Krementsov, N. (2011). From "beastly philosophy" to medical genetics: Eugenics in Russia and the Soviet Union. Annals of Science, 68(1), 61–92. doi:10.1080/00033790.2010.527162
- Krementsov, N. (2018). With and without Galton: Vasilii Florinskii and the fate of eugenics in Russia. Open Book Publishers.
- Mogilner, M. (2016). Racial psychiatry and the Russian imperial dilemma of the "savage within." East Central Europe, 43(1–2), 99–133.
- Mogilner, M. (2022). A race for the future: Scientific visions of modern Russian Jewishness. Harvard University Press.
- Nesturkh, M. F. (1964). The races of mankind (G. H. Hanna, Trans.). Foreign Languages Publishing House.
- Rainbow, D. (Ed.). (2019). Ideologies of race: Imperial Russia and the Soviet Union in global context. McGill-Queen's University Press.

=== Skeletal biology, paleoanthropology, and bioarchaeology ===
- Alekseev, V. P. (1973). Paleodemography of the USSR. Soviet Anthropology and Archeology, 12(3), 50–82. doi:10.2753/AAE1061-1959120350
- Alekseev, V. P. (1986). The origin of the human race (H. C. Creighton, Trans.). Progress Publishers.
- Alekseeva, T. I., & Buzhilova, A. P. (1997). Medieval urban Russians according to anthropological data: Origins, paleodemography, paleoecology. Anthropology & Archeology of Eurasia, 35(4), 42–62. doi:10.2753/AAE1061-1959350442
- Chikisheva, T. A., Zubova, A. V., Krivoshapkin, A. L., Kurbatov, V. P., Volkov, P. V., & Titov, A. T. (2014). Trepanation among the early nomads of Gorny Altai: A multidisciplinary study. Archaeology, Ethnology & Anthropology of Eurasia, 42(1), 130–141. doi:10.1016/j.aeae.2014.10.013
- Derevianko, A. P., Shunkov, M. V., & Kozlikin, M. B. (2020). Who were the Denisovans? Archaeology, Ethnology & Anthropology of Eurasia, 48(3), 3–32. doi:10.17746/1563-0110.2020.48.3.003-032
- Gerasimov, M. M. (1971). The face finder (A. H. Brodrick, Trans.). J. B. Lippincott.
- Gunz, P., & Bulygina, E. (2012). The Mousterian child from Teshik-Tash is a Neanderthal: A geometric morphometric study of the frontal bone. American Journal of Physical Anthropology, 149(3), 365–379. doi:10.1002/ajpa.22133
- Kiryushin, Y. F., & Solodovnikov, K. N. (2011). The origins of the Andronovo (Fedorovka) population of southwestern Siberia, based on a Middle Bronze Age cranial series from the Altai forest-steppe zone. Archaeology, Ethnology & Anthropology of Eurasia, 38(4), 122–142. doi:10.1016/j.aeae.2011.02.011
- Kozintsev, A. G. (2020). The origin of the Okunev population, southern Siberia: The evidence of physical anthropology and genetics. Archaeology, Ethnology & Anthropology of Eurasia, 48(4), 135–145. doi:10.17746/1563-0110.2020.48.4.135-145
- Levin, M. G. (1963). Ethnic origins of the peoples of northeastern Asia (H. N. Michael, Ed.; Anthropology of the North: Translations from Russian Sources, No. 3). University of Toronto Press.
- Mednikova, M. B. (2002). Scalping in Eurasia. Anthropology & Archeology of Eurasia, 40(4), 57–67. doi:10.2753/AAE1061-1959400457
- Moiseev, V. G., Zubova, A. V., & Khartanovich, V. I. (2017). The Upper Paleolithic man from Markina Gora: Morphology vs. genetics? Herald of the Russian Academy of Sciences, 87(2), 165–171. doi:10.1134/S1019331617010099
- Movsesian, A. A., & Bakholdina, V. Yu. (2017). Nonmetric cranial trait variation and the origins of the Scythians. American Journal of Physical Anthropology, 162(3), 589–599. doi:10.1002/ajpa.23159
- Nesturkh, M. F. (1959). The origin of man (G. H. Hanna, Trans.). Foreign Languages Publishing House.
- Trinkaus, E., Buzhilova, A. P., Mednikova, M. B., & Dobrovolskaya, M. V. (2014). The people of Sunghir: Burials, bodies, and behavior in the earlier Upper Paleolithic. Oxford University Press.

== Geology ==
For works about earth and environmental life sciences see Bibliography of Russian and Soviet science (Life sciences).

- Barr, W. (1991). Aleksandr Lavrent'yevich Chekanovskiy, pioneer geologist and explorer of north central Siberia, 1873–76. Earth Sciences History, 10(2), 106–129.
- Bessudnova, Z. A. (2013). Grigory (Gotthelf) Fischer von Waldheim (1771–1853): Author of the first scientific works on Russian geology and palaeontology. Earth Sciences History, 32(1), 102–120.
- Chubarov, I. (2018). Russian research in late imperial China: The case of Vladimir Obruchev's expedition to west China, 1892–1894. Earth Sciences History, 37(1), 130–143.
- Collie, M., & Diemer, J. (Eds.). (2004). Murchison's wanderings in Russia: His geological exploration of Russia in Europe and the Ural Mountains, 1840 and 1841. British Geological Survey.
- Khain, V. E. (1991). Mobilism and plate tectonics in the USSR. Tectonophysics, 199(2–4), 137–148.
- Khain, V. E., & Ryabukhin, A. G. (2002). Russian geology and the plate tectonics revolution. In D. R. Oldroyd (Ed.), The earth inside and out: Some major contributions to geology in the twentieth century (Geological Society Special Publication No. 192, pp. 185–198). Geological Society of London.
- Kolbantsev, L. R. (2015). On the history of the first Russian geological map. Earth Sciences History, 34(2), 333–347.
- Rowland, S. M. (2013). The life and geological writings of the 'father of Russian science': Mikhail Lomonosov. Earth Sciences History, 32(1), 86–101.
- Strnad, J. (1991). The discovery of diamonds in Siberia and other northern regions: Explorational, historical, and personal notes. Earth Sciences History, 10(2), 227–246.
- Tikhomirov, V. V. (1995). Studies of the history of geology in the Soviet Union in the second half of the 20th century. Earth Sciences History, 14(2), 202–206.

== Academic journals ==
Very few journals are dedicated specifically to the history of science and technology in Russia and the Soviet Union; the specialist journal is listed first, followed by general history of science and technology journals and Russian, Soviet, and Slavic studies journals that regularly publish work in this field.

Specialist journal

- Voprosy istorii estestvoznaniia i tekhniki (VIET; Studies in the History of Science and Technology). Institute for the History of Science and Technology, Russian Academy of Sciences (1980–present). ISSN 0205-9606. [In Russian, with English abstracts.]

History of science, technology, and medicine

- Isis. University of Chicago Press for the History of Science Society.
- Technology and Culture. Johns Hopkins University Press for the Society for the History of Technology.
- History and Technology. Taylor & Francis.
- Annals of Science. Taylor & Francis.
- British Journal for the History of Science. Cambridge University Press for the British Society for the History of Science.
- Historical Studies in the Natural Sciences. University of California Press.
- IEEE Annals of the History of Computing. IEEE Computer Society.

Russian, Soviet, and Slavic studies

- Kritika: Explorations in Russian and Eurasian History. Slavica Publishers.
- Slavic Review. Cambridge University Press for the Association for Slavic, East European, and Eurasian Studies.
- The Russian Review. Wiley.
- Russian History. Brill.
- Europe-Asia Studies. Taylor & Francis.
- Russian Studies in History. Taylor & Francis.

== See also ==
- Bibliography of Russian history
- Bibliography of the Soviet Union
