= Yearbook on International Communist Affairs =

Annual assessment of communist parties around the globe from 1966 to 1991

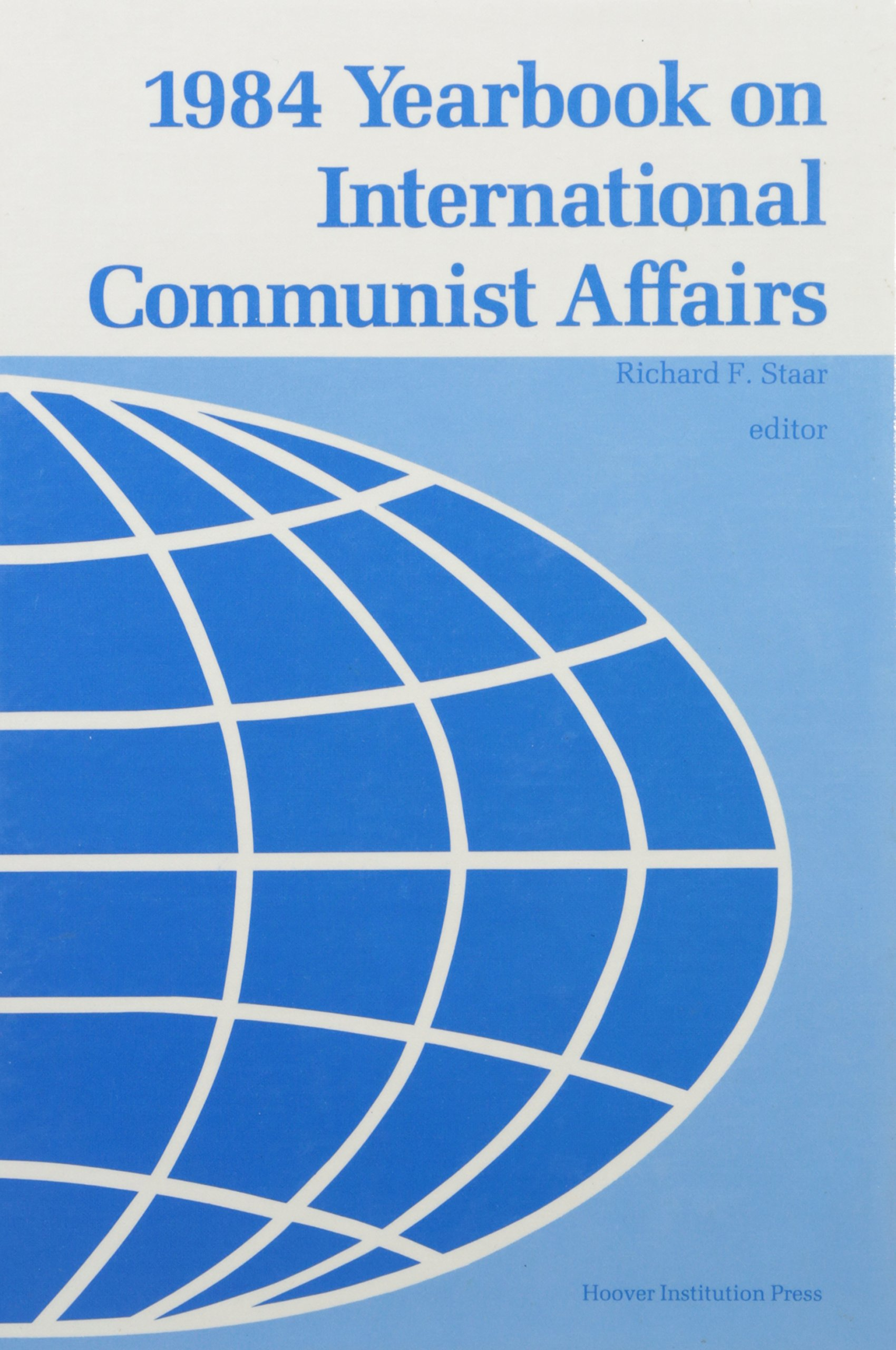
- Cover of the 1984 edition
- Edited by: Milorad M. Drachkovitch, Richard F. Staar (1969–1991)
- Country: United States
- Language: English
- Discipline: Communist studies
- Publisher: Hoover Institution Press, Stanford University
- Published: 1966–1991
- Media type: Print
- No. of books: 25
- OCLC: 1680890

The Yearbook on International Communist Affairs is a series of 25 books published annually between 1966 and 1991, which chronicle the activities of communist parties throughout the world. It was published by the Hoover Institution Press, Stanford University. Richard F. Staar served as its editor in chief for most of its editions.

The Yearbook was widely regarded as an objective, comprehensive, very detailed, and reliable reference work, with high quality editorial work. Reviewers noted that no other similar vast compilation of worldwide Communist activities had existed prior to the creation of this book series, becoming "the most authoritative word on the subject".

== History ==
=== Creation ===
In a foreword in the first edition, W. Glenn Campbell, Director of The Hoover Institution on War, Revolution, and Peace, stated the following reasons for creating such a volume:

The international communist movement has had a profound impact inupon the modern world. In the half-century since the Bolshevik Revolution the movement has expanded steadily. Communist parties now rule in fourteen countries and are active in some 75 others. At the same time, the movement has become more complex and fragmented, particularly as divergent tendencies have arisen in the past dozen years. For these reasons, the Hoover Institution decided to begin publication of a Yearbook on International Communist Affairs, a project designed to provide an annual compendium and reference work for scholars, teachers, students, policymakers, journalists, and others.

In 1971 the Il Politico journal noted that the publication of that year's volume had been possible with the financial support from the Mary Reynolds Babcock Foundation, the Carthage Foundation, the Earhart Foundation, and the Esso Education Foundation.

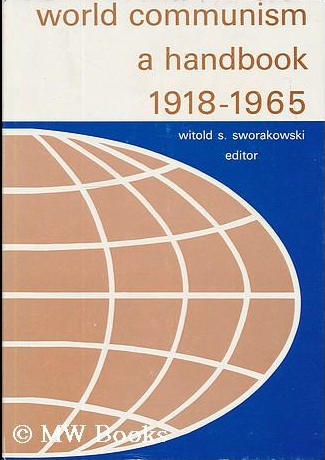

==== Companion retrospective publication ====
The first edition of the Yearbook appeared in conjunction with another publication by the Hoover Institution: World Communism: A Handbook 1918–1965, which surveyed the historical and structural developments of all communist parties, from their foundation until the end of 1965. The Yearbook then took over to offer documentation for 1966 (and onwards).

=== Editors and contributors ===
With some variations, each book had a chief editor, an assistant editor (aided by a "small full-time team" working at the Hoover Institution), an editorial board or area editors (depending on which edition, at times also called "foreign correspondents"), and an advisory board ("of distinguished scholars in the field of communism and international affairs from both the United States and Western Europe"). There was also a large number of expert contributors in covering each of the countries in the Yearbook; these were initially uncredited, but identified in later editions.

The lead editors at inception of the series for the 1966 year volume were Milorad M. Drachkovitch and Lewis H. Gann. They were followed by Richard Allen and Milorad Popov. Since 1969 and until the end of the series in 1991, Richard F. Staar was its main editor.

=== Discontinuation ===
As the Soviet Union weakened, leading to its dissolution in 1991, Communism as a major global geopolitical factor also faded. As Gerald Segal writing for the International Affairs put it in 1990, the Yearbook was still a "reliable" and "essential" reference work, however with all the changes in the Communist world, including "the breaching of the Berlin Wall and the coming of political pluralism to most of Eastern Europe", it was becoming a repository of "esoteric history".

In this context the Yearbook saw its last edition published covering the year 1991, its 25th anniversary edition. The Washington Post noted how the discontinuation of the Yearbook was a sign of the times, stating:

In addition to trying to take an active role in the changes sweeping the Soviet Union, American experts also are seeking new directions for scholarship that long focused exclusively on communism and the Cold War. In a symbolic underscoring of how outmoded those topics suddenly have become, the Hoover Institution has decided that its just published Yearbook of International Communist Affairs will be the last edition of a work long regarded as the most authoritative word on the subject. Still, Richard F. Starr, editor of the Yearbook, thinks it is not yet time to abandon the strategic studies that long were the underpinning of Soviet scholarship. He now is concentrating his research on efforts to reform and restructure the Soviet armed forces.

== Scope and contents ==
The books series was conceived to be a "continuing publication in English on the international political activities of the various communist parties, or on the relations among communists themselves."

According to the 1979 edition (and representative of the entire series), the purpose was to provide basic data concerning organizational and personnel changes, attitudes towards domestic and foreign policies, and activities of communist parties and international front organizations through the world. Much of the information came from primary source materials in the native languages. Profiles on each party included founding date, legal or proscribed status, membership, electoral and parliamentary (if any) strength, leadership, auxiliary organizations, domestic activities, ideological orientation, views on international issues, attitude toward the Sino-Soviet dispute, and principal news media.

The criterion for a party to be included in the books was its identity as a Marxist–Leninist party, and recognized by authoritative communist publications such as the World Marxist Review. That is, parties that were pro-Soviet, pro-Chinese, Castroite, Trotskyist, as well as other rival communist movements. Every edition in the book series covered around 100 parties. International mass organizations under communist leadership were also included.

With some variations over the years, the books included the following sections:

- Introduction/Overview
- Profiles of Individual Communist Parties (by country, constituting the majority of the content of each book)
  - History
  - Organization and leadership
  - Domestic affairs, views and policies
  - International views and activities
  - Publications
- Register of Communist Parties
- Chronology
- Survey of International Communist and National Revolutionary Conferences
- Description of International Communist Front Organizations
- Documents
- Biographies of Prominent International Communist Figures
- Bibliography
- Index by Names, and Subjects

The Yearbook averaged over 950 pages in its first few editions, and continued to oscillate between about 500 to over 1000 pages throughout the duration of the series.

== Reception ==
=== Accolades ===
The book series was generally very well regarded by scholars. Talking about the first volume, J.M. Bocheński noted that "the reviewer does not believe that anything comparable in scope, wealth of information and exactness has been produced by any Communist organization. It will certainly be a standard reference by all scholars interested in Communism, Communist and non-Communist alike. It is hoped that similar volumes will be published for subsequent years." He further added, "it would be difficult to exaggerate the importance and usefulness of this work." Similarly Avakumovic, writing for Pacific Affairs, concurred, calling it a pioneering work.

In subsequent volumes, the series continued to be praised, with multiple academic reviewers describing the book series as being a "monumental study" having "inestimable value for anyone interested in international affairs", a scholarly tool very rich in detail and comprehensive in scope, free of cold war jargon, detached and impartial, and overall being a good distillation of the prior year's events into a single volume, and "best available reference on the contemporary communist world".

The Washington Post, reporting on the discontinuation of the book series in 1991, praised it as "a work long regarded as the most authoritative word on the subject."

=== Challenges, limitations, and criticisms ===
In 1970 the Slavic Review noted that in the 1960s new challenges arose in identifying communist parties and movements, with the scene having become "more confused by the appearance of Marxist- oriented-guerrilla and 'New Leftist' movements which also might be designated 'Communist'." The authors coped with the multiplicity and divergence of communist branches by focussing their coverage on those self-described as Marxist–Leninist and those recognized by authoritative Communist publications, such as the World Marxist Review. However, the editors did still not "face up to (...) the concept of the 'international Communist movement.'"

Similarly Karl Schmitt writing for The Hispanic American Historical Review in 1972 also shared his concerns that the definition of communist parties had become inadequate.

Early in the series some reviewers pointed that the wealth of compiled objective data in the book would have benefitted from the editors providing more interpretation, analysis, and theoretical considerations. Some reviewers concluded that the work reads more like an encyclopedia, dictionary, or "catalogue" than an "analytical perspective". In that regard, the American Political Science Review further noted that the work contained "too much factual summary", however "within the framework and strictures of this probably insoluble problem, Staar and his able editorial staff did an outstanding job in offering us invaluable raw materials" that are of value to further study of the movement and literature of contemporary international Communist affairs.

in 1970, the reviewer for that year's book for Africa Today noted that the Africanists would find the coverage on Africa to be weak, while still noting that the sections with Communist parties in the rest of the world were quite valuable. On the other hand, in 1972 the Journal of Asian History remarked that the Asian countries were thoroughly covered.

Some commentators also noted the high price of the first volumes may have put the book out of reach of many, but later that was changed by making it more affordable. Also it was noted that some data from year to year might have been repetitive, as some basic facts about the parties remained the same. The reviewer for Canadian Slavonic Papers wondered "Would it not be wiser to prepare revised volume every five or six years and keep it up to date with annual supplements which included only new material?" As the new editions changed a bit their format from prior ones, some reviewers lamented the shortening or removal of some sections such as documentation, chronicle, or introduction.

Ryszard Szawłowski writing for Soviet Studies in 1979 opined that some contributing authors for the Yearbook were based far away from their target countries of study, and believing that recruiting contributors closer to their geographical areas of study that would enable them to provide a more nuanced and on-the-ground recounting of facts.

A minority of reviewers also questioned some of the relevance of the Yearbook. Charles B. McLane, writing for the Canadian Slavonic Papers asserted in 1972 that there was some irony in the appearance of the series "two decades after it was most urgently needed", as "In the years after World War II, when intense anti-Communist sentiment in Western Europe and the United States coloured the reporting of developments in the Communist world scholars, government officials and the public at large would have profited greatly by the dispassionate appraisals which characterize the Yearbooks". However, by the time the Yearbook series appeared, the world communist movement was already "a less formidable force in international politics than it once was, or appeared to be.", with a small number of countries with significant but already well-studied movements, and many others being marginal and of no meaningful impact in international affairs.

Near the end of the series, and shortly after the fall of the Berlin Wall, Gerald Segal writing in 1990 for the International Affairs journal, commented on the declining relevance of the book series as communism as a major geopolitical factor was fading; for "those who dare to retain an interest in comparative communism" the 1990 volume may continue to offer them an "essential" "meticulous report" on the prior year's events, but for most, the events in the communist world had become "esoteric history".

== Availability ==
Physical prints are available in various libraries.

Cover of the World Strength of the Communist Party Organizations – 1963 intelligence report

== Similar works ==
The World Strength of the Communist Party Organizations, was an annual report on communism of more limited scope, published by the Bureau of Intelligence and Research of the U.S. Department of State since 1948. It was initially conceived as an "in-house" text on Communist parliamentary and party strength. It received favorable notice and was subsequently issued as a public document. Some editions are available on-line.

== See also ==
- Soviet and Communist studies
- Kremlinology
