= Marlène Laruelle =

French historian (born 1972)

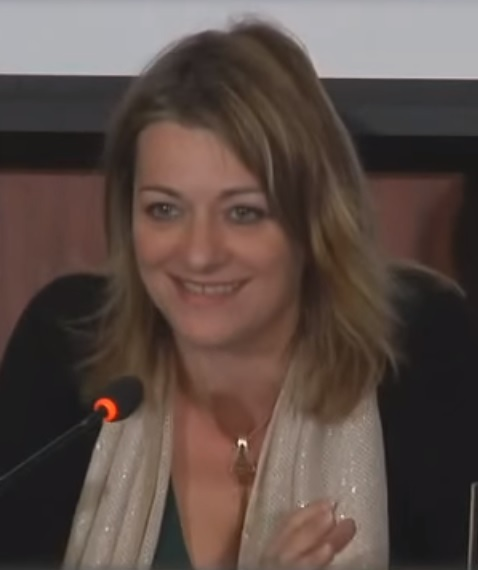
- Laruelle in 2015
- Born: 21 December 1972 (age 53); Maisons-Alfort, France
- Citizenship: French
- Education: National Institute for Oriental Languages and Civilizations
- Occupations: Historian sociologist political scientist
- Employer: George Washington University
- Known for: Studies on Eurasia and Europe
- Title: Director of the Institute for European, Russian and Eurasian Studies (IERES)
- Father: François Laruelle
- Website: marlene-laruelle.com

Marlène Laruelle (French: [maʁlɛn laʁɥɛl]; born 21 December 1972, Maisons-Alfort) is a French historian, sociologist, and political scientist specializing on Eurasia and Europe.

She is Research Professor and Director of the Institute for European, Russian and Eurasian Studies (IERES) at the George Washington University (GW). Laruelle is also a co-director of PONARS (Program on New Approaches to Research and Security in Eurasia), Director of GW's Central Asia Program, and Director of GW's Illiberalism Studies Program. She received her Ph.D. in history at the National Institute of Oriental Languages and Cultures (INALCO) and spent time as a post-doc in the area of political science at Sciences Po in Paris. She is Senior Associate Scholar at the Institut français des relations internationales (IFRI). Her particular focus of interest is post-Soviet political, social and cultural developments, especially ideologies and nationalism. She is the daughter of the French philosopher François Laruelle.

== Books ==
=== Monographs ===
- 2025 Ideology and Meaning-Making under the Putin Regime. Stanford University Press, doi:10.1515/9781503641600, ISBN 978-1-5036-4159-4.
- 2021 Is Russia Fascist?: Unraveling Propaganda East and West. Cornell University Press, ISBN 978-1501754135
- 2018 Russian Nationalism. Imaginaries, Doctrines and Political Battlefields, London: Routledge, available in Open Access.
- 2018 Understanding Russia. The Challenges of Transformation, Lanham, Boulder, New York: Rowman & Littlefield, co-authored with Jean Radvanyi.
- 2014 Russia's Arctic Strategies and the Future of the Far North (New York: M.E. Sharpe, 2014).
- 2012 Russian Eurasianism: An Ideology of Empire (Washington D.C.: Woodrow Wilson Press/Johns Hopkins University Press, hard cover 2008, paperback 2012).
- 2012 Globalizing Central Asia. Geopolitics And The Challenges Of Economic Development (New York: M.E. Sharpe, 2012), co-authored with Sebastien Peyrouse.
- 2012 The ‘Chinese Question’ in Central Asia. Domestic Order, Social Changes, and the Chinese Factor (London/New York: Columbia University Press and Hurst, 2012), co-authored with Sebastien Peyrouse.
- 2009 In the Name of the Nation. Nationalism and Politics in contemporary Russia (New York: Palgrave/MacMillan, 2009).

=== Edited volumes ===
- 2019 The Nazarbayev Generation. Youth in Kazakhstan. Lanham, MD: Lexington.
- 2018 Entangled Far Rights. A Russian-European Intellectual Romance in the 20th century, Pittsburgh: Pittsburgh University Press.
- 2018 Tajikistan on the Move. Statebuilding and Societal Transformations. Lanham, MD: Lexington.
- 2018 Mass Media in the Post-Soviet World. Market Forces, State Actors, and Political Manipulation in the Informational Environment after Communism. Stuttgart: Ibidem-Verlag, co-edited with Peter Rollberg.
- 2018 Being Muslim in Central Asia: Practices, Politics, and Identities. London and Leiden: Brill.
- 2018 Constructing the Uzbek State. Narratives of the Post-Soviet Years. Lanham, MD: Lexington.
- 2017 The Central Asia–Afghanistan Relationship. From Soviet Intervention to the Silk Road Initiatives, Lanham, MD: Lexington.
- 2016 Kazakhstan in the Making. Legitimacy, Symbols and Social Changes, Lanham, MD: Lexington.
- 2016 New Mobilities and Social Changes in Russia’s Arctic Regions, London: Routledge.
- 2015 Kyrgyzstan beyond ‘Democracy Island’ and ‘Failing State’: Social and Political Changes in a Post-Soviet Society, Lanham, MD: Lexington, co-edited with Johan Engval.
- 2015 Eurasianism and the European Far-right: Reshaping the Europe-Russia Relationship (Lexington Books, 2015).
- 2015 Between Europe and Asia: The Origins, Theories, and Legacies of Russian Eurasianism (University of Pittsburgh Press, 2015), co-edited with Mark Bassin and Sergei Glebov.
- 2011 Mapping Central Asia: Indian Perceptions and Strategies (Farnham, UK: Asghate, 2011), with Sebastien Peyrouse.
- 2010 China and India in Central Asia. A new “Great Game”? (New York: Palgrave Macmillan, 2010), with Jean-François Huchet, Sébastien Peyrouse, Bayram Balci.
- 2010 Russian Nationalism and the National Reassertion of Russia (London: Routledge, hard cover 2009, paperback 2010).
