= Post-Soviet studies =

Field of study focusing on post-Soviet societies

Post-Soviet studies, also known as post-Soviet area studies or Former Soviet Union (FSU) studies, is a field of study within sociology and political science that emerged out of Soviet studies and Sovietology following the dissolution of the Soviet Union. The field encompasses a broad range of studies in the area of the former Soviet Union, including within Slavic studies and Central Eurasian studies, and the study of specific post-Soviet states, including: Armenianology, Baltic studies, Belarusian studies, Central Asian studies, Georgian studies, Russian studies, Ukrainian studies, and others.

Broader themes in post-Soviet studies include the role of postcolonial analysis, and the relevance of analysis in context of the former Soviet Union as studies of the region progress into the post-Soviet era.

== See also ==
- Europe-Asia Studies
