= Geoffrey Wheeler (historian) =

British historian

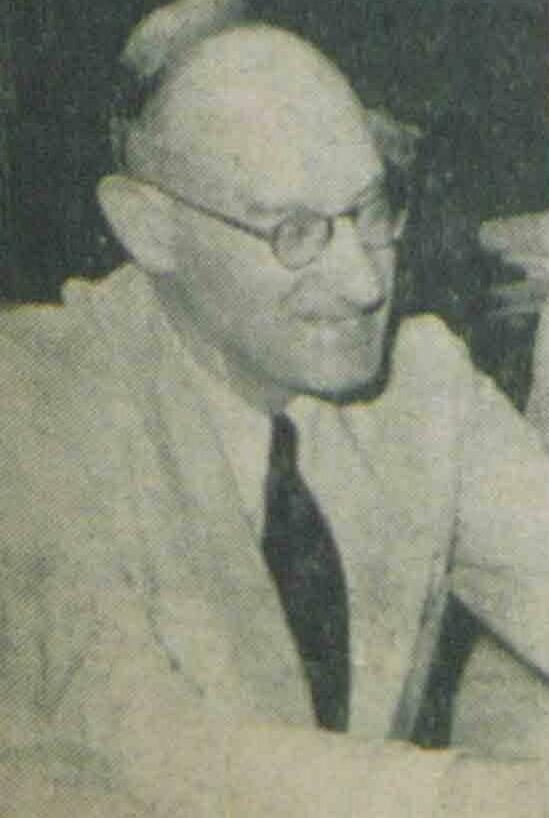
- Born: 22 June 1897
- Died: 1 February 1990 (aged 92)
- Military career
- Allegiance: United Kingdom
- Branch: British Army
- Service years: 1915-1949
- Rank: Lieutenant-Colonel
- Conflicts: World War I World War II
- Awards: Companion of the Order of the Indian Empire

Lieutenant-Colonel Geoffrey Edleston Wheeler CIE CBE (22 June 1897 – 1 February 1990) was a British soldier and an historian of Central Asia.

== Life ==
Geoffrey Edleston Wheeler was born in Bromley, Kent, England to Owen Wheeler, a Captain Army Reserve Officer, and his wife Eugenie. Wheeler followed in the footsteps of his father, an infantry officer, and was commissioned into the Queen's Royal West Surrey Regiment in 1915 as a second lieutenant, and he reached the rank of captain before the end of the war. In 1918 he transferred to the Indian army. He initially served in the 1/6th Gurkha Rifles, and later in the 7th Rajput Regiment. From 1919 to 1925 he was attached to General Staff as an intelligence officer covering India, Palestine and Malta.

In 1926 Wheeler served in Mashhad, Iran as the British Military Attaché and he was stationed in Iraq from 1928 to 1931. Wheeler spent the next decade and a half in India where he served in the External Affairs Department, the Ministry of Information and General Staff Army Headquarters.

In 1946 Wheeler was stationed at the British embassy Teheran, Iran (1946–1953), where he served as both the Press and Oriental Councillor until he returned to London in 1950.

He retired from the Indian Army in 1949 as a Lieutenant-Colonel.

In 1953 Wheeler retired from government service and founded the Central Asian Research Centre in London. He served as director of the centre until 1968 and editor of its journal Central Asian Review, one of the main venues for Central Asian research. He also sat as the Chairman of the Editorial Board of the Journal of the Royal Central Asian Society from 1961 to 1966.

Wheeler wed Irena Bulatova in 1927 and they remained married until she died in 1973. They had one son.

Wheeler died in Surrey, England. His memoirs "Fifty years of Asia" are located at Oxford University, St Antony's College in the Middle East Centre Archive. Wheeler's career is extensively covered in Myer's Islam and Colonialism: Western Perspective on Soviet Asia.

== Writing ==
Wheeler's writing focused on the history of Central Asia from the time of the Russian conquest of the region in the mid-nineteenth century to Soviet occupation of Central Asia in the 20th century. Wheeler's work is notable because he was one of the few scholars working to promote Central Asian Studies at a time when the field was in decline due to travel and research restrictions Soviet authorities imposed on academics. Wheeler engaged in the debates that raged in Central Asia Studies during the Cold War: what was the nature of Soviet colonialism in Central Asia and how was Central Asian ethnic identity formed. His books and articles were widely read amongst scholars and appear in the holdings of academic libraries around the globe.

== Works and related materials ==
- Geoffrey Wheeler Collection: TS Memoirs 'Fifty years of Asia.' GB165-0298. Oxford University, St Antony's College, Middle East Centre Archive. NRA catalogue reference: NRA 20811 St Antony's College.
- Schuyler, Eugene. Turkistan, Notes of a Journey in Russian Turkistan, Kokand, Bukhara and Kuldja. Ed. Geoffrey Wheeler. Abridged by K.E. West. London: Routledge and Kegan Paul, 1966.
- Spuler, Bertold. The Mongols in History. Translated by Geoffrey E. Wheeler. New York: Paragon Book Gallery, 1971.
- Wheeler, Geoffrey. "British Policy in Central Asia in the Early Nineteenth Century. The Mission of Richmond Shakespeare." Central Asian Review. VI, No. 4. (1958.)
- "Cultural Developments in Soviet Central Asia." Journal of the Royal Central Asian Society. 41, III. (1954.)
- "Islam and the Soviet Union." Asian Affairs. 10. (1979.)
- "Islam in the USSR." Central Asian Review. 9, IV. (1961.)
- The Modern History of Soviet Central Asia. London: Weidenfelf and Nicolson, 1964.
- "The Muslims of Central Asia." Problems of Communism. 16, V. (1967.)
- Nationality and Nationalism in Soviet Muslim Asia.. Azad Bhavan, 1961.
- "Religion and the Soviet State: a Dilemma of Power." National and Religious Consciousness in Soviet Islam. Ed. M. Hayward and W Fletcher. London: Pall Mall, 1969.
- The Peoples of Soviet Central Asia: A Background Book. London: Bodley Head, 1966.
- "Race Relations in Soviet Muslim Asia." Journal of the Royal Central Asian Society. 47, II. (1960).
- Racial Problems in Soviet Muslim Asia. London: Oxford University Press, 1960.
- "Russia and Islam: New Trends in Soviet Policy." Central Asian Review. 4, I. (1956.)
- Russia and China in Central Asia. Journal of the Royal Central Asian Society 54, III. (1967.)
- "Russia and the Middle East." Journal of the Royal Central Asian Society. 44, III. (1957.)
- "Russian Conquest and Colonization in Central Asia." Russian Imperialism from Ivan the Great to the Revolution Ed. Taras Hunczak. New Brunswick: Rutgers University Press 1974.
- "The Russian Presence in Central Asia." Canadian Slavonic Papers. 17, II-III. (1975).
- Swords and Plowshares; The Indian Army as a Social Force. Washington: The Government of India Information Services, 1944.
- "The Turkic Languages of Soviet Muslim Asia: Russian Linguistic Policy." Middle Eastern Studies, XIII, no. 2, (1977.)
- Wheeler, Geoffrey E. "Soviet and Chinese Policies in the Middle-East." The World Today. v. 22. no. 2. (Feb 1966.)
- Gerald Morgan (1981). Anglo-Russian Rivalry in Central Asia: 1810–1895, Epilogue by Geoffrey Wheeler. Routledge, London. ISBN 0714631795.

== Bibliography ==
- Bloch, Jonathan and Fitzgerald, Patrick. British Intelligence and Covert Action. Ireland: Brandon Book Publishers, 1984. p. 271
- Dorril, Stephen. MI6: Inside the Covert World of Her Majesty's Secret Intelligence Service. New York: The Free Press, 2000. pp. 535, 568.
- Leach, Hugh, Luce Irigaray, Kullada-Kesbooncho Mead, and Susan Farrington. Strolling About on the Roof of the World: The First Hundred Years of the Royal Society for Asian Affairs (Formerly Royal Central Asian Society). London: Routledge, 2003. pp. 121, 202. ISBN 0-415-29857-1.
- Myer, Will. Islam and Colonialism: Western Perspective on Soviet Asia. London: RoutledgeCurzon, 2002. ISBN 0-7007-1765-X.
- Ramsay, Robin. A Who's Who of the British Secret State. Hull: Lobster, 1989.
