= Bibliography of Russian and Soviet science: Technology =

Bibliography of works about Russian and Soviet technology

This is a select bibliography of academic level English language books (including translations) and journal articles, published mainly post World War II, (Note: works published during or before World War II should be limited to areas where there is no significant post World War II books on the subject or when the work in question has significant historical merit.) about the history of technology in Russia and the Soviet Union.

For other areas of science, please see:

Works listed here are cited in the notes or bibliographies of scholarly sources. Each is published by an academic or major press, written by a recognized expert, or substantially reviewed in scholarly journals; borderline cases are omitted. A selection of primary sources are included. Many of the books below carry their own bibliographies; see the Further reading section for other bibliographies, and the External links section for historical sites, academic sites, and museums.

Citations follow APA style. (Note: Entries are in plain text APA 7 format without templates; templates are used only for reviews and notes.) Book have citations to academic journal or mainstream published reviews when available. For books only partly about the subject, relevant chapter or section titles are provided when useful and available. Translators of the original-language edition are included when possible. In cases where a title or name has appeared with more than one English spelling, the most recent published form is used and a footnote documents any earlier title under which the work appeared.

== Engineering ==
- Amann, R., Cooper, J., & Davies, R. W. (Eds.). (1977). The Technological Level of Soviet Industry. Yale University Press.
- Bailes, K. E. (1974). The politics of technology: Stalin and technocratic thinking among Soviet engineers. The American Historical Review, 79(2), 445–469.
- Bailes, K. E. (1978). Technology and Society under Lenin and Stalin: Origins of the Soviet Technical Intelligentsia, 1917–1941. Princeton University Press.
- Gerovitch, S. (2007). "New Soviet man" inside machine: Human engineering, spacecraft design, and the construction of communism. Osiris, 22(1), 135–157.
- Graham, L. R. (1993). The Ghost of the Executed Engineer: Technology and the Fall of the Soviet Union. Harvard University Press.
- Graham, L. R. (2013). Lonely Ideas: Can Russia Compete? MIT Press.
- Hill, M. R. (2020). Politics and technology: The case of Soviet mechanical engineering. Icon, 25(1), 56–77.
- Josephson, P. R. (2010). Would Trotsky Wear a Bluetooth? Technological Utopianism under Socialism, 1917–1989. Johns Hopkins University Press.
- Neimark, A. (2012). The infrastructural monument: Stalin's water works under construction and in representation. Future Anterior, 9(2), 1–14.
- Nikiforova, N. (2015). The concept of technology and the Russian cultural research tradition. Technology and Culture, 56(1), 184–203.
- Ruder, C. A. (1998). Making History for Stalin: The Story of the Belomor Canal. University Press of Florida.
- Schattenberg, S. (2002). Stalins Ingenieure: Lebenswelten zwischen Technik und Terror in den 1930er Jahren. Oldenbourg. [In German]
- Shearer, D. R. (1991). The language and politics of socialist rationalization: Productivity, industrial relations, and the social origins of Stalinism at the end of NEP. Cahiers du Monde russe et soviétique, 32(4), 581–608.
- Siddiqi, A. (2015). Scientists and specialists in the Gulag: Life and death in Stalin's sharashka. Kritika: Explorations in Russian and Eurasian History, 16(3), 557–588.
- Sochor, Z. A. (1981). Soviet Taylorism revisited. Soviet Studies, 33(2), 246–264.
- Stites, R. (1989). Revolutionary Dreams: Utopian Vision and Experimental Life in the Russian Revolution. Oxford University Press.
- Vaingurt, J. (2008). Poetry of labor and labor of poetry: The universal language of Alexei Gastev's biomechanics. The Russian Review, 67(2), 209–229.
- Zakharova, L., & MacKinnon, E. (2020). Trust in bureaucracy and technology: The evolution of secrecy policies and practice in the Soviet state apparatus (1917–91). Kritika: Explorations in Russian and Eurasian History, 21(3), 555–590.

=== Environmental Engineering ===
- Josephson, P. R. (2002). Industrialized Nature: Brute Force Technology and the Transformation of the Natural World. Island Press.
- Olšáková, D. (Ed.). (2016). In the Name of the Great Work: Stalin's Plan for the Transformation of Nature and its Impact in Eastern Europe. Berghahn Books.
- Zeisler-Vralsted, D. (2015). Rivers, Memory, and Nation-Building: A History of the Volga and Mississippi Rivers. Berghahn Books.

== Energy ==
- Bösch, F. (2014). Energy diplomacy: West Germany, the Soviet Union and the oil crises of the 1970s. Historical Social Research, 39(4), 165–185.
- Bruisch, K. (2025). Burning Swamps: Peat and the Forgotten Margins of Russia's Fossil Economy. Cambridge University Press.
- Coopersmith, J. (1992). The Electrification of Russia, 1880–1926. Cornell University Press.
- De Groot, M. (2020). The Soviet Union, CMEA, and the energy crisis of the 1970s. Journal of Cold War Studies, 22(4), 4–30.
- Dienes, L., & Shabad, T. (1979). The Soviet Energy System: Resource Use and Policies. V. H. Winston & Sons.
- Esno, T. (2018). Reagan's economic war on the Soviet Union. Diplomatic History, 42(2), 281–304.
- Giebelhaus, A. W. (1996). The emergence of the discipline of petroleum engineering: An international comparison. Icon, 2, 108–122.
- Gustafson, T. (1989). Crisis amid Plenty: The Politics of Soviet Energy under Brezhnev and Gorbachev. Princeton University Press.
- Hewett, E. A. (1984). Energy, Economics, and Foreign Policy in the Soviet Union. Brookings Institution.
- Labbate, S. (2026). Italy and Soviet gas: The history of a dependence (1960–1984). Cold War History. Advance online publication.
- Martellaro, J. A. (1985). The acquisition and leasing of the Baku oilfields by the Russian Crown. Middle Eastern Studies, 21(1), 80–88.
- Matala, S. (2023). National security, security of supply: Finlandisation as a diplomatic practice and the Finnish energy dependency on the Soviet Union, 1948–1992. The International History Review, 45(3), 551–571.
- McKay, J. P. (1984). Baku oil and Transcaucasian pipelines, 1883–1891: A study in Tsarist economic policy. Slavic Review, 43(4), 604–623.
- Movsumzade, E. M. (2002). The beginning of petroleum transportation in Russia. Icon, 8, 156–167.
- Perović, J. (Ed.). (2017). Cold War Energy: A Transnational History of Soviet Oil and Gas. Palgrave Macmillan.
- Perović, J., & Krempin, D. (2014). "The key is in our hands:" Soviet energy strategy during détente and the global oil crises of the 1970s. Historical Social Research, 39(4), 113–144.
- Schattenberg, S. (2022). Pipeline construction as "soft power" in foreign policy: Why the Soviet Union started to sell gas to West Germany, 1966–1970. Journal of Modern European History, 20(4), 554–573.
- Tolf, R. W. (1976). The Russian Rockefellers: The Saga of the Nobel Family and the Russian Oil Industry. Hoover Institution Press.

=== Electrification ===
- Beuerle, B. (2025). A dormant giant: Renewable energy in the Soviet Union and Russia (1970s–present). The Russian Review, 84(2), 267–282. doi:10.1111/russ.70012
- Carlin, W., Schaffer, M., & Seabright, P. (2013). Soviet power plus electrification: What is the long-run legacy of communism? Explorations in Economic History, 50(1), 116–147. doi:10.1016/j.eeh.2012.07.003
- Coopersmith, J. (1992). The Electrification of Russia, 1880–1926. Cornell University Press.
- Coopersmith, J. (1993). Soviet electrification: The roads not taken. IEEE Technology and Society Magazine, 12(2), 13–20. doi:10.1109/44.216772
- Josephson, P. R. (1995). "Projects of the century" in Soviet history: Large-scale technologies from Lenin to Gorbachev. Technology and Culture, 36(3), 519–559. doi:10.1353/tech.1995.0050 JSTOR 3107240
- Josephson, P. R. (2002). Industrialized Nature: Brute Force Technology and the Transformation of the Natural World. Island Press.
- Leversedge, F. M. (1977). Plan GOELRO and Soviet electric power development. The Soviet and Post-Soviet Review, 4(1), 237–255. doi:10.1163/187633277X00187
- Makarov, A. A., & Mitrova, T. A. (2020). Centenary of the GOELRO plan: Opportunities and challenges of planned economy. Thermal Engineering, 67(11), 779–789. doi:10.1134/S0040601520110087
- Michel, A. A., & Klain, S. A. (1964). Current problems of the Soviet electric power industry. Economic Geography, 40(3), 206–220. JSTOR 142422
- Pittman, R. (2007). Restructuring the Russian electricity sector: Re-creating California? Energy Policy, 35(3), 1872–1883. doi:10.1016/j.enpol.2006.06.006
- Rassweiler, A. D. (1983). Soviet labor policy in the First Five-Year Plan: The Dneprostroi experience. Slavic Review, 42(2), 230–246. JSTOR 2497515
- Rassweiler, A. D. (1988). The Generation of Power: The History of Dneprostroi. Oxford University Press.
- Zeisler-Vralsted, D. (2015). Rivers, Memory, and Nation-Building: A History of the Volga and Mississippi Rivers. Berghahn Books.
- Zheltova, E. L. (1995). The electrification of Soviet Russia: The myth and mystification of the Bolshevik electrification program, 1910–1928. The American Journal of Semiotics, 12(1), 147–184. doi:10.5840/ajs1995121/49

=== Nuclear Power ===
- Guth, S. (2019). Breeding Soviet progress: Or "To the pioneers of the distant future fly our 20th-century dreams!". Cahiers du Monde russe, 60(2/3), 281–308.
- Josephson, P. R. (1996). Atomic-powered communism: Nuclear culture in the postwar USSR. Slavic Review, 55(2), 297–324.
- Josephson, P. R. (1999). Red Atom: Russia's Nuclear Power Program from Stalin to Today. W. H. Freeman.
- Potter, W. C. (1991). The impact of Chernobyl on nuclear power safety in the Soviet Union. Studies in Comparative Communism, 24(2), 191–210.
- Rindzevičiūtė, E. (2021). Nuclear Power as Cultural Heritage in Russia. Slavic Review, 80(4), 839–862.
- Schmid, S. D. (2015). Producing Power: The Pre-Chernobyl History of the Soviet Nuclear Industry. MIT Press.
- Wendland, A. V. (2019). Nuclearizing Ukraine – Ukrainizing the atom: Soviet nuclear technopolitics, crisis, and resilience on the imperial periphery. Cahiers du Monde russe, 60(2/3), 335–368.

== Transportation ==
=== Automobiles ===
- Busch, T. N. (2011). Women and children first? Avtodor's campaigns and the limits of Soviet automobility from 1927 to 1935. The Russian Review, 70(3), 397–418.
- Busch, T. N. (2013). "Comrades, start your engines!": Mobility, legitimacy, and roads to socialism in the Soviet interwar period. Canadian-American Slavic Studies, 47(2), 221–246. doi:10.1163/22102396-04702005
- Fava, V. (2018). Between business interests and ideological marketing: The USSR and the Cold War in Fiat corporate strategy, 1957–1972. Journal of Cold War Studies, 20(4), 26–64.
- Gatejel, L. (2016). Appealing for a car: Consumption policies and entitlement in the USSR, the GDR, and Romania, 1950s–1980s. Slavic Review, 75(1), 122–145. JSTOR 10.5612/slavicreview.75.1.122
- Greenstein, D. E. (2014). Assembling Fordizm: The production of automobiles, Americans, and Bolsheviks in Detroit and early Soviet Russia. Comparative Studies in Society and History, 56(2), 259–289. doi:10.1017/S0010417514000048 JSTOR 43908503
- Holliday, G. D. (1979). Technology Transfer to the USSR, 1928–1937 and 1966–1975: The Role of Western Technology in Soviet Economic Development. Westview Press.
- Lonkila, M. (2011). Driving at democracy in Russia: Protest activities of St Petersburg car drivers' associations. Europe-Asia Studies, 63(2), 291–309. doi:10.1080/09668136.2011.547699
- Schultz, K. S. (1990). Building the "Soviet Detroit": The construction of the Nizhnii-Novgorod automobile factory, 1927–1932. Slavic Review, 49(2), 200–212. JSTOR 2499480
- Siegelbaum, L. H. (2005). Soviet car rallies of the 1920s and 1930s and the road to socialism. Slavic Review, 64(2), 247–273. JSTOR 3649984
- Siegelbaum, L. H. (2008). Roadlessness and the "path to communism": Building roads and highways in Stalinist Russia. The Journal of Transport History, 29(2), 277–294. doi:10.7227/TJTH.29.2.8
- Siegelbaum, L. H. (2008). Cars for Comrades: The Life of the Soviet Automobile. Cornell University Press.
- Siegelbaum, L. H. (2009). On the side: Car culture in the USSR, 1960s–1980s. Technology and Culture, 50(1), 1–22. doi:10.1353/tech.0.0224
- Siegelbaum, L. H. (Ed.). (2011). The Socialist Car: Automobility in the Eastern Bloc. Cornell University Press.
- Usenyuk-Kravchuk, S., Klyusov, N., Hyysalo, S., & Klimenko, V. (2020). Depending on users: The case of over-snow motorized transport in Russia. Icon, 25(2), 76–102.

=== Maritime Technology ===
For military maritime technology, see Bibliography of Russian and Soviet science (Military technology).

- Cross, A. G. (1997). By the Banks of the Neva: Chapters from the Lives and Careers of the British in Eighteenth-Century Russia. Cambridge University Press.
- Saunders, D. (2016). Icebreakers in Anglo-Russian relations (1914–21). The International History Review, 38(4), 814–829.
- Walters, W. D., Jr. (1995). The changing geography of Russian/Soviet naval construction, 1890–1989. Post-Soviet Geography, 36(3), 157–175.
- Zeisler-Vralsted, D. (2015). Rivers, Memory, and Nation-Building: A History of the Volga and Mississippi Rivers. Berghahn Books.

=== Aviation ===
For military aviation technology, see Bibliography of Russian and Soviet science (Military technology).

- Bailes, K. E. (1976). Technology and legitimacy: Soviet aviation and Stalinism in the 1930s. Technology and Culture, 17(1), 55–81.
- Gordon, Y., & Komissarov, D. (2013). Soviet and Russian Testbed Aircraft. Hikoki Publications.
- Gorman, G. S. (1998). The Tu-4: The travails of technology transfer by imitation. Air Power History, 45(1), 16–27.
- Gunston, B. (1995). The Osprey Encyclopedia of Russian Aircraft, 1875–1995. Osprey Publishing.
- Harris, S. E. (2020). Dawn of the Soviet jet age: Aeroflot passengers and aviation culture under Nikita Khrushchev. Kritika: Explorations in Russian and Eurasian History, 21(3), 591–626.
- Palmer, S. W. (2000). Peasants into pilots: Soviet air-mindedness as an ideology of dominance. Technology and Culture, 41(1), 1–26.
- Palmer, S. W. (2006). Dictatorship of the Air: Aviation Culture and the Fate of Modern Russia. Cambridge University Press.
- Yakovlev, A. S. (1970). Fifty Years of Soviet Aircraft Construction. Israel Program for Scientific Translations.

== Western Technical Assistance and Technology Transfer ==
- Bailes, K. E. (1981). The American connection: Ideology and the transfer of American technology to the Soviet Union, 1917–1941. Comparative Studies in Society and History, 23(3), 421–448.
- Conroy, M. S. (2004). Russian-American pharmaceutical relations, 1900–1945. Pharmacy in History, 46(4), 143–166.
- Dalrymple, D. G. (1964). The American tractor comes to Soviet agriculture: The transfer of a technology. Technology and Culture, 5(2), 191–214.
- Engerman, D. C. (2000). Modernization from the other shore: American observers and the costs of Soviet economic development. The American Historical Review, 105(2), 383–416.
- Engerman, D. C. (2003). Modernization from the Other Shore: American Intellectuals and the Romance of Russian Development. Harvard University Press.
- Fitzgerald, D. (1996). Blinded by technology: American agriculture in the Soviet Union, 1928–1932. Agricultural History, 70(3), 459–486.
- Greenstein, D. E. (2014). Assembling "Fordizm": The production of automobiles, Americans, and Bolsheviks in Detroit and early Soviet Russia. Comparative Studies in Society and History, 56(2), 259–289.
- Hale-Dorrell, A. (2015). The Soviet Union, the United States, and industrial agriculture. Journal of World History, 26(2), 295–324.
- Holliday, G. D. (1979). Technology Transfer to the USSR, 1928–1937 and 1966–1975: The Role of Western Technology in Soviet Economic Development. Westview Press.
- Melnikova-Raich, S. (2010). The Soviet problem with two "unknowns": How an American architect and a Soviet negotiator jump-started the industrialization of Russia, part I: Albert Kahn. IA. The Journal of the Society for Industrial Archeology, 36(2), 57–80.
- Melnikova-Raich, S. (2011). The Soviet problem with two "unknowns": How an American architect and a Soviet negotiator jump-started the industrialization of Russia, part II: Saul Bron. IA. The Journal of the Society for Industrial Archeology, 37(1/2), 5–28.
- Naleszkiewicz, W. (1966). Technical assistance of the American enterprises to the growth of the Soviet Union, 1929–1933. The Russian Review, 25(1), 54–76.
- Peterson, M. (2016). US to USSR: American experts, irrigation, and cotton in Soviet Central Asia, 1929–32. Environmental History, 21(3), 442–466.
- Rassweiler, A. D. (1983). Soviet labor policy in the first Five-Year Plan: The Dneprostroi experience. Slavic Review, 42(2), 230–246.
- Rassweiler, A. D. (1988). The Generation of Power: The History of Dneprostroi. Oxford University Press.
- Schultz, K. S. (1990). Building the "Soviet Detroit": The construction of the Nizhnii-Novgorod automobile factory, 1927–1932. Slavic Review, 49(2), 200–212.
- Scott, J. (1989). Behind the Urals: An American Worker in Russia's City of Steel (Enl. ed., S. Kotkin, Ed.). Indiana University Press. [Primary source]
- Sherover, M. M. (1932). Magnitogorsk: Epic of Soviet labor. Current History, 36(4), 405–410.
- Siegel, K. A. S. (1993). Technology and trade: Russia's pursuit of American investment, 1917–1929. Diplomatic History, 17(3), 375–398.
- Siegel, K. A. S. (1996). Loans and Legitimacy: The Evolution of Soviet-American Relations, 1919–1933. University Press of Kentucky.
- Sutton, A. C. (1968). Western Technology and Soviet Economic Development, 1917 to 1930. Hoover Institution Press.
- Sutton, A. C. (1971). Western Technology and Soviet Economic Development, 1930 to 1945. Hoover Institution Press.
- Sutton, A. C. (1973). Western Technology and Soviet Economic Development, 1945 to 1965. Hoover Institution Press.
- Tzouliadis, T. (2008). The Forsaken: An American Tragedy in Stalin's Russia. Penguin Press.
- White, C. (1986). Ford in Russia: In pursuit of the chimeral market. Business History, 28(4), 77–104.
- Witkin, Z. (1991). An American Engineer in Stalin's Russia: The Memoirs of Zara Witkin, 1932–1934 (M. Gelb, Ed.). University of California Press. [Primary source]
- Zimmerman, C. (2017). Albert Kahn in the Second Industrial Revolution. AA Files, (75), 28–44.
- Zimmerman, C. (2019). Building the world capitalist system: The "invisible architecture" of Albert Kahn Associates of Detroit, 1900–1961. Fabrications, 29(2), 231–256.

== Computing and Communications Technology ==
=== Computing, Robotics and Cybernetics ===
- Afinogenov, G. (2013). Andrei Ershov and the Soviet information age. Kritika: Explorations in Russian and Eurasian History, 14(3), 561–584.
- Cave, M. (1980). Computers and Economic Planning: The Soviet Experience. Cambridge University Press.
- Conyngham, W. J. (1980). Technology and decision making: Some aspects of the development of OGAS. Slavic Review, 39(3), 426–445.
- Gerovitch, S. (2001). "Mathematical machines" of the Cold War: Soviet computing, American cybernetics and ideological disputes in the early 1950s. Social Studies of Science, 31(2), 253–287.
- Gerovitch, S. (2001). "Russian scandals": Soviet readings of American cybernetics in the early years of the Cold War. The Russian Review, 60(4), 545–568.
- Gerovitch, S. (2002). From Newspeak to Cyberspeak: A History of Soviet Cybernetics. MIT Press.
- Gerovitch, S. (2008). InterNyet: Why the Soviet Union did not build a nationwide computer network. History and Technology, 24(4), 335–350.
- Goodman, S. E. (1979). Soviet computing and technology transfer: An overview. World Politics, 31(4), 539–570.
- Goodman, S. E., & McHenry, W. K. (Eds.). (1988). Global Trends in Computer Technology and Their Impact on Export Control. National Academy Press.
- Günther, C. (2023). The cultural and political imaginary of cybernetic socialism. Kritika: Explorations in Russian and Eurasian History, 24(2), 321–348.
- Herrmann, F. (2026). No digital networks without computers: The shortcomings of the Soviet computer industry. Internet Histories, 10(1), 29–44.
- Holloway, D. (1974). Innovation in science: The case of cybernetics in the Soviet Union. Science Studies, 4(4), 299–337.
- Huntress, W. T., Jr., & Marov, M. Ya. (2011). Soviet Robots in the Solar System: Mission Technologies and Discoveries. Springer.
- Judy, R. W., & Lommel, J. M. (1986). The new Soviet computer literacy campaign. Educational Communication and Technology, 34(2), 108–123.
- Kozyrev, Yu. G. (1985). Industrial Robots Handbook (P. S. Ivanov, Trans.). Mir Publishers. [Primary/technical source, trans. from Russian]
- Loebl, E. (1971). Computer socialism. Studies in Soviet Thought, 11(4), 294–300.
- Malinovsky, B. N. (2010). Pioneers of Soviet Computing (A. Fitzpatrick, Ed.; E. Aronie, Trans.). SIGCIS.
- Peters, B. (2012). Normalizing Soviet cybernetics. Information & Culture, 47(2), 145–175.
- Peters, B. (2016). How Not to Network a Nation: The Uneasy History of the Soviet Internet. MIT Press.
- Popov, E. P., & Yurevich, E. I. (1987). Robotics. Mir Publishers. [Primary/technical source, trans. from Russian]
- Rindzevičiūtė, E. (2026). De-centring the history of the internet in the Soviet Union: Computers, networks and the infrastructural politics of digitality in Lithuania. Internet Histories, 10(1), 11–28.
- Sanborn, J. (2022). Cybernetics and surveillance: The secret police enter the computer age. Kritika: Explorations in Russian and Eurasian History, 23(3), 605–628.
- Tatarchenko, K. (2017). "The computer does not believe in tears": Soviet programming, professionalization, and the gendering of authority. Kritika: Explorations in Russian and Eurasian History, 18(4), 709–739.
- Tatarchenko, K., & Phillips, C. J. (2016). Mathematical superpowers: The politics of universality in a divided world. Historical Studies in the Natural Sciences, 46(5), 549–555.
- Trogemann, G., Nitussov, A. Y., & Ernst, W. (Eds.). (2001). Computing in Russia: The History of Computer Devices and Information Technology Revealed. Vieweg.
- Umpleby, S. A. (1987). American and Soviet discussions of the foundations of cybernetics and general systems theory. Cybernetics and Systems, 18(2), 177–193.

=== Communications Technology ===
- Evans, C. E. (2016). Between Truth and Time: A History of Soviet Central Television. Yale University Press.
- Lovell, S. (2015). Russia in the Microphone Age: A History of Soviet Radio, 1919–1970. Oxford University Press.
- Roth-Ey, K. (2011). Moscow Prime Time: How the Soviet Union Built the Media Empire That Lost the Cultural Cold War. Cornell University Press.

==== Telegraph ====
- Iversen, M. J. (2003). Via Northern: Strategic and organisational upheavals of Great Northern Telegraph Company, 1939–1948 and 1966–1977. Scandinavian Economic History Review, 51(1), 29–45. doi:10.1080/03585522.2003.10410836
- Jacobsen, K. (2009). Small nation, international submarine telegraphy, and international politics: The Great Northern Telegraph Company, 1869–1940. In B. Finn & D. Yang (Eds.), Communications under the seas: The evolving cable network and its implications (pp. 115–158). MIT Press. doi:10.7551/mitpress/7869.003.0010
- Jacobsen, K. (2010). Wasted opportunities? The Great Northern Telegraph Company and the wireless challenge. Business History, 52(2), 231–250. doi:10.1080/00076791003611871
- McReynolds, L. (1990). Autocratic journalism: The case of the St. Petersburg Telegraph Agency. Slavic Review, 49(1), 48–57. JSTOR 2500415
- Rantanen, T., & Vartanova, E. (1995). News agencies in post-communist Russia: From state monopoly to state dominance. European Journal of Communication, 10(2), 207–220. doi:10.1177/0267323195010002003
- Siefert, M. (2011). "Chingis Khan with the telegraph": Communications in the Russian and Ottoman empires. In J. Leonhard & U. von Hirschhausen (Eds.), Comparing empires: Encounters and transfers in the long nineteenth century (pp. 80–110). Vandenhoeck & Ruprecht.
- Siefert, M. (2020). The Russian Empire and the International Telegraph Union, 1856–1875. In G. Balbi & A. Fickers (Eds.), History of the International Telecommunication Union (ITU): Transnational techno-diplomacy from the telegraph to the internet (pp. 15–36). De Gruyter Oldenbourg. doi:10.1515/9783110669701-002
- Susskind, C. (1962). Popov and the beginnings of radiotelegraphy. Proceedings of the IRE, 50(10), 2036–2047. doi:10.1109/JRPROC.1962.288232
- Vartanova, E. (2026). TASS. In O. Boyd-Barrett, P. Aguiar, & C. Vukasovich (Eds.), The Routledge handbook of news agencies (pp. 149–161). Routledge. doi:10.4324/9781032704210-16
- Vevier, C. (1959). The Collins Overland Line and American continentalism. Pacific Historical Review, 28(3), 237–253. JSTOR 3636469
- Zakharova, L. (2014). Communication, mobility and control in the Soviet Union after World War II. In K. Burrell & K. Hörschelmann (Eds.), Mobilities in socialist and post-socialist states: Societies on the move (pp. 23–44). Palgrave Macmillan. doi:10.1057/9781137267290_2
- Zakharova, L. (2022). Electrical signalling (1): Telegraph. In K. Postoutenko, A. Tikhomirov, & D. Zakharine (Eds.), Media and communication in the Soviet Union (1917–1953): General perspectives (pp. 285–300). Palgrave Macmillan. doi:10.1007/978-3-030-88367-6_17

==== Telephone ====
- Kleberg, L. (2012). Silence and surveillance: A history of culture and communication. Baltic Worlds, 5(1), 18–23.
- Kudriavtzev, G. G., & Varakin, L. E. (1990). Economic aspects of telephone network development: The USSR plan. Telecommunications Policy, 14(1), 7–14. doi:10.1016/0308-5961(92)90105-X
- Ledeneva, A. (2008). Telephone justice in Russia. Post-Soviet Affairs, 24(4), 324–350. doi:10.2747/1060-586X.24.4.324
- Lewis, J. P. (1976). Communications output in the USSR: A study of the Soviet telephone systems. Soviet Studies, 28(3), 406–417.
- Solnick, S. L. (1991). Revolution, reform and the Soviet telephone system, 1917–1927. Soviet Studies, 43(1), 157–175.
- Zakharova, L. (2013). Access to communication tools in Stalin's Soviet Union. Annales. Histoire, Sciences Sociales (English Edition), 68(2), 357–391. doi:10.1017/S2398568200000261
- Zakharova, L. (2016). Was the Soviet telephone a medium of secondary orality? Some evidence from Soviet films of the 1930s–1970s. Russian Journal of Communication, 8(2), 183–194.

==== Telecommunications ====
- Rohozinski, R. (2000). How the internet did not transform Russia. Current History, 99(639), 334–338.
- Wilson, A. C. (1990). A thousand years of postal and telecommunications services in Russia. New Zealand Slavonic Journal, 135–166.

==== Television ====
- Abramson, A. (1995). Zworykin, Pioneer of Television. University of Illinois Press.
- Bönker, K. (2015). "Dear television workers...": TV consumption and political communication in the late Soviet Union. Cahiers du Monde russe, 56(2/3), 371–399.
- Downing, J. (1985). The Intersputnik system and Soviet television. Soviet Studies, 37(4), 465–483.
- Evans, C. (2011). Song of the year and Soviet mass culture in the 1970s. Kritika: Explorations in Russian and Eurasian History, 12(3), 617–645.
- Evans, C. (2015). The "Soviet way of life" as a way of feeling: Emotion and influence on Soviet Central Television in the Brezhnev era. Cahiers du Monde russe, 56(2/3), 543–569.
- LoSasso, M. A. (2022). The unknown war of the Eastern Front: The first American-Soviet television production and détente's World War II. Historical Journal of Film, Radio and Television, 42(4), 823–840.
- Lundgren, L. (2017). (Un)familiar spaces of television production: The BBC's visit to the Soviet Union in 1956. Historical Journal of Film, Radio and Television, 37(2), 315–332.
- Norr, H. (1985). National languages and Soviet television: A statistical report. Nationalities Papers, 13(1), 84–105.
- Powell, D. E. (1975). Television in the USSR. The Public Opinion Quarterly, 39(3), 287–300.
- Remington, T. (1981). The mass media and public communication in the USSR. The Journal of Politics, 43(3), 803–817.
- Roth-Ey, K. (2007). Finding a home for television in the USSR, 1950–1970. Slavic Review, 66(2), 278–306.

==== Radio ====
- Bönker, K. (2017). The "radiofication" of the Soviet Union. Kritika: Explorations in Russian and Eurasian History, 18(3), 613–618.
- Calkins, L. M. (2026). Yiddish language broadcasting on Polish and Soviet radio, 1944–1945: Ephemeral media and the evidentiary value of the BBC's "special listening section" monitoring logbooks. Holocaust Studies, 32(2), 148–173.
- Lovell, S. (2011). How Russia learned to listen: Radio and the making of Soviet culture. Kritika: Explorations in Russian and Eurasian History, 12(3), 591–615.
- Lovell, S. (2013). Broadcasting Bolshevik: The radio voice of Soviet culture, 1920s–1950s. Journal of Contemporary History, 48(1), 78–97.
- Mikkonen, S. (2010). Stealing the monopoly of knowledge?: Soviet reactions to U.S. Cold War broadcasting. Kritika: Explorations in Russian and Eurasian History, 11(4), 771–805.
- Roth-Ey, K. (2020). Listening out, listening for, listening in: Cold War radio broadcasting and the late Soviet audience. The Russian Review, 79(4), 556–577.
- Smirnov, V. V. (2012). Radio broadcasting in New Russia: Specifics of structure and problems functioning. Journal of Radio & Audio Media, 19(2), 278–287.
- Williams, F. (1961). The Soviet philosophy of broadcasting. Journal of Broadcasting & Electronic Media, 6(1), 3–10.
- Zakharine, D. (2016). Speaking for the Soviet land: Voice and mediated communities in the age of early broadcast. Russian Journal of Communication, 8(2), 168–182.
- Ziglin, R. (1935). Radio broadcasting in the Soviet Union. The Annals of the American Academy of Political and Social Science, 177, 66–72.

== Academic journals ==
Very few journals are dedicated specifically to the history of science and technology in Russia and the Soviet Union; the specialist journal is listed first, followed by general history of science and technology journals and Russian, Soviet, and Slavic studies journals that regularly publish work in this field.

Specialist journal

- Voprosy istorii estestvoznaniia i tekhniki (VIET; Studies in the History of Science and Technology). Institute for the History of Science and Technology, Russian Academy of Sciences (1980–present). ISSN 0205-9606. [In Russian, with English abstracts.]

History of science, technology, and medicine

- Isis. University of Chicago Press for the History of Science Society.
- Technology and Culture. Johns Hopkins University Press for the Society for the History of Technology.
- History and Technology. Taylor & Francis.
- Annals of Science. Taylor & Francis.
- British Journal for the History of Science. Cambridge University Press for the British Society for the History of Science.
- Historical Studies in the Natural Sciences. University of California Press.
- IEEE Annals of the History of Computing. IEEE Computer Society.

Russian, Soviet, and Slavic studies

- Kritika: Explorations in Russian and Eurasian History. Slavica Publishers.
- Slavic Review. Cambridge University Press for the Association for Slavic, East European, and Eurasian Studies.
- The Russian Review. Wiley.
- Russian History. Brill.
- Europe-Asia Studies. Taylor & Francis.
- Russian Studies in History. Taylor & Francis.

== See also ==
- Bibliography of Russian history
- Bibliography of the Soviet Union
