= Daniel Chirot =

American writer and academic (born 1942)

- Born: November 27, 1942 (age 83); Vichy France
- Education: B.A. Harvard University; Ph.D. Columbia University
- Occupations: Historian, Russian studies
- Employer: University of Washington
- Notable work: Why Not Kill Them All?: The Logic and Prevention of Mass Political Murder (2006); The Shape of the New: Four Big Ideas and How They Made the Modern World (2015); You Say You Want a Revolution?: Radical Idealism and Its Tragic Consequences (2020)
- Spouse: Cynthia Kenyon Chirot (m. 1974)
- Children: 2

Daniel Chirot (born 1942) is an American historian and writer on Russia. He is the Herbert J. Ellison Professor of Russian and Eurasian Studies at the University of Washington. Chirot is also the founder of the journal East European Politics and Societies, and has written and edited many books and articles.

== Early life and education ==
Daniel Chirot was born to Jewish parents in Vichy France on November 27, 1942. His parents were able to evade the Nazis until the end of World War II, and in 1948 Chirot and his family immigrated to the United States. Chirot graduated from Harvard University in 1964 and earned his Ph.D. from Columbia University in 1973.

== Career ==
Chirot has taught in the Henry M. Jackson School of International Studies at the University of Washington since 1975, and was appointed as the Herbert J. Ellison Professor of Russian and Eurasian Studies in 1980. He has written on the subject of authoritarian regimes, tyranny, and genocide, publishing 15 books and numerous articles in such scholarly journals as the Journal of Asian Studies, East European Politics and Societies, Studies in Ethnicity and Nationalism, Journal of Democracy, Society, International Sociology, and Perspectives on Politics.

Chirot served at the United States Institute of Peace in Washington, D.C., as a senior fellow from 2004 to 2005, and has received grants from the John Simon Guggenheim Foundation, the Mellon Foundation, the Rockefeller Foundation, and the U.S. State Department.

== Personal life ==
Chirot married Cynthia Kenyon, a banker, in 1974. Together they have two children, Claire and Laura.

== Publications ==
- Social Change in a Peripheral Society: The Creation of a Balkan Colony, Academic Press (New York, NY), 1976.
- Social Change in the Twentieth Century, Harcourt (New York, NY), 1977.
- Social Change in the Modern Era, Harcourt (San Diego, CA), 1986.
- The Origins of Backwardness in Eastern Europe, University of California Press (Berkeley, CA), 1989. (Editor)
- The Crisis of Leninism and the Decline of the Left: The Revolutions of 1989, University of Washington Press (Seattle, WA), 1991. (Editor)
- National Liberations and Nationalist Nightmares: The Consequences of the End of Empires in Eastern Europe in the Twentieth Century, University of California Press (Berkeley, CA), 1993.
- How Societies Change, Pine Forge Press (Thousand Oaks, CA), 1994, 2nd edition, 2012.
- Modern Tyrants: The Power and Prevalence of Evil in Our Age, Free Press (New York, NY), 1994.
- Essential Outsiders: Chinese and Jews in the Modern Transformation of Southeast Asia and Central Europe, University of Washington Press (Seattle, WA), 1997. (Editor, with Anthony Reid)
- Ethnopolitical Warfare: Causes, Consequences, and Possible Solutions, American Psychological Association (Washington, DC), 2001. (Editor, with Martin E.O. Seligman)
- Why Not Kill Them All? The Logic and Prevention of Mass Political Murder, Princeton University Press (Princeton, NJ), 2006 (with Clark McCauley)
- Contentious Identities: Ethnic, Religious, and Nationalist Conflicts in Today's World, Routledge (New York, NY), 2011.
- Confronting Memories of World War II: European and Asian Legacies, University of Washington Press (Seattle, WA), 2014.
- The Shape of the New: Four Big Ideas and How They Made the Modern World, Princeton University Press (Princeton, NJ), 2015.
- You Say You Want a Revolution? Radical Idealism and Its Tragic Consequences, Princeton University Press (Princeton, NJ), 2020.
