= Central Asian Review =

- Discipline: Asian studies, Asian history
- Language: English
- Edited by: Geoffrey Wheeler

Publication details
- History: 1953–1968
- Publisher: Central Asian Research Centre

Standard abbreviations
- ISO 4: Cent. Asian Rev.

Links
- Online access

Central Asian Review was a journal of Central Asian studies published from 1953 to 1968. A 1954 review in Soviet Studies deemed that its work on Soviet Central Asia "performs an invaluable service and does it well," while more recent scholarship notes that it "gave reports on a wide variety of Central Asian topics gleaned from the Soviet press with often favourable comment." The journal's full title was Central Asian Review: A Quarterly Review of Current Developments in Soviet Central Asia and Kazakhstan and was published quarterly by the Central Asian Research Centre in association with St. Antony's College, Oxford University. Founder and director of the center, Geoffrey Wheeler was the editor-in-chief and frequent contributor to the journal. It was included in the Bibliography of Asian Studies.

Central Asian Review was one of the primary venues for scholarly articles concerning Central Asia and was the main English language source for digests of Soviet press coverage of Central Asia. The journal was notable because it was one of the few periodicals of Central Asian Studies published during a time when research in the field was difficult, due to Soviet censorship and travel restrictions for researchers. In 1968 Wheeler left the Central Asian Research Center and the following year "Central Asian Review" was incorporated into the journal Mizan, published by the center from 1965 to 1971.
