= Central Asian studies =

Central Asian studies is the discipline of studying the culture, history, and languages of the region of Central Asia. The roots of Central Asian studies as a social science discipline goes to 19th century Anglo-Russian Great Game. During the 19th century, Central Asia became a subject of systematical information collection and organization thanks to the numerous travels made by British and Russian agents, soldiers, scholars into the region. After the collapse of the Soviet Union, interest in the field increased considerably. Central Asian studies in contemporary times is represented by a plethora of prominent scholars, institutions and academic programs throughout the world.

== History ==
The roots of Central Asian studies as a social science discipline goes to 19th century Anglo-Russian Great Game. During the 19th century, Central Asia became a subject of systematical information collection and organization thanks to the numerous travels made by British and Russian agents, soldiers, scholars into the region. The British Royal Geographical Society and Russian Geographical Society published dozens of travel books on the region.

The late 19th century Russian Orientalist Vasilii Vladimirovich Bartold is credited as the founder of the modern study of Central Asian history.

The collapse of the Soviet Union in 1991 led to an increased interest in the study of Central Asia.

Contemporary Central Asian studies have been developed by pioneers such as Nicholas Poppe, Denis Sinor, Ilse Laude-Cirtautas, Alexandre Bennigsen, Edward Allworth, Yuri Bregel and Hasan Bulent Paksoy among others. Several American research universities have programs on Central Asia. The Mongolian and Altaic Studies Program within the Far Eastern and Russian Institute at the University of Washington (UW), established under Poppe's direction in 1949, became an early prototype of Central Asian Studies. The Central Asian Studies Program, later formed by Cirtautas in 1968 at the UW, and the Department of Central Eurasian Studies at Indiana University have been the leading research and teaching programs. Many scholars involved in Central Asia studies belong to the Central Eurasian Studies Society. There are many prominent global think tanks and research organizations from the United States, the United Kingdom, India, China, Germany, and from the region itself, who are focused on Central Asian studies. These include the Cambridge Central Asia Forum, Harriman Institute, Central Asia Program, Central Asia-Caucasus Institute, Oxus Society for Central Asian Affairs, Tillotoma Foundation etc.

== Travelogues of Central Asia ==
One of the oldest sources for Central Asia are the memoirs of travelers who passed through Central Asia. Some of the earliest extant examples were left by Arab geographers who passed through the region. In the 19th centuries numerous Europe and American published their travelogues of Central Asia. This includes American journalist Anna Louise Strong who passed through Uzbekistan, Kyrgyzstan and Tajikistan in the 1920s.

== List of Central Asian Studies Journals ==
- Central Asia Monitor, was in publication from 1992 to 2002. Its editor-in-chief was Valery Chalidze and the primary editor was David Nalle.
- Central Asian Review, was published from 1953 to 1968 through the Central Asian Research Centre in association with St. Antony's College, Oxford University. The editor was Geoffrey Wheeler. In 1968 Wheeler left the Central Asian Research Center and the following year “Central Asian Review” was incorporated into the journal Mizan, published by the center from 1965 to 1971.
- Central Asian Survey, began publication in 1982 out of the United Kingdom and continues to publish to this day.
- Journal of Central and Inner Asian Dialogue (JCIAD), along with its supplementary newsletter, JCIAD News, strive to inform the academic community and the public at large about the rich cultures, literature, languages and histories of the peoples of Central and Inner Asia. JCIAD and its newsletter are devoted to bringing the works of native scholars and literary figures of Central/Inner Asia—an area encompassing the Turkic, Mongolian and Tungusic populated regions of Asia east of the Volga—to light.
- Journal of the Royal Central Asian Society, began publication in 1914 as the Journal of the Central Asian Society. From 1931 to 1969 it was published under the title of the Journal of the Royal Central Asian Society. In 1969 the title was changed to Asian Affairs and the focus of the contents shifted from Central Asia to South Asia and East Asia.

== See also ==
- History of Central Asia
- Geopolitics in Central Asia
- Indo-European migrations
- Turkic migration
- Turkology

== Sources ==
- Levi, Scott C. (2012). "Early Modern Central Asia in World History". History Compass. 10 (11): 866–878. doi:10.1111/hic3.12004. ISSN 1478-0542.
- Tengri on Mars
- Central Asian Literature at Texas Tech University
- Cambridge Central Asia Programme at Jesus College, University of Cambridge
