= Richard Felix Staar =

American political scientist and historian (1923–2018)

- Born: January 10, 1923; Warsaw, Poland
- Died: March 27, 2018 (aged 95); Portola Valley, California
- Citizenship: USA
- Occupations: political scientist and historian

Academic work
- Notable works: Yearbook on International Communist Affairs

Richard Felix Staar (January 10, 1923 – March 27, 2018) was an American political scientist and historian. He held a position of senior fellow at Stanford University's Hoover Institution. His areas of specialization included Russia and East-Central Europe (former Soviet Union, post-Soviet states and the Eastern Bloc), military strategy, national security, arms control, and public diplomacy. He was an author of numerous books and articles.

Staar was born in Warsaw, Poland, in 1923. He graduated from Dickinson College in 1948 and received a master's degree from Yale University in 1949. Following his master's degree, he joined the Central Intelligence Agency as an intelligence officer, holding that position until 1950. In 1950 and 1951 he worked as a library assistant at the University of Michigan. Also in 1951, he joined the U.S. Department of State as an intelligence research specialist, a post he held until 1954, when he completed a Ph.D. in political science at the University of Michigan.

From 1954 to 1957, he served on the faculty of Harding College, moving to Arkansas State College for one year (1957–58). In 1958 he went to Munich, Germany, where he served for one year as chief of program analysis for Radio Free Europe. He returned to the United States in 1959 to become a member of the faculty of Emory University, where he remained until 1969 when he joined the Hoover Institution. There, he became the editor in chief of the Yearbook on International Communist Affairs from 1969 until 1991.

In 1981, President Ronald Reagan appointed him to the position of U.S. Ambassador to the Mutual and Balanced Force Reductions (MBFR) negotiations in Vienna, Austria, a position he held until resigning in 1983. He has also been a visiting professor at the National War College, and was a colonel in the U.S. Marine Corps Reserve. In 1983, at the age of 60, he was awarded the presidential Legion of Merit.

The Sarmatian Review, in a review of his book Born Under A Lucky Star: Reminiscences, said of him: "As associate director of the Hoover Institution for a critical twelve years, he helped make that organization serve the Soviet-slaying purpose for which its founder had endowed it."

He died on March 27, 2018.
