= Communist and Post-Communist Studies =

- Discipline: Political science
- Language: English

Publication details
- Former names: Communist Affairs (1962–1968); Studies in Comparative Communism (1968–1992)
- History: 1962–present
- Publisher: University of California Press (United States)
- Frequency: Quarterly

Standard abbreviations
- ISO 4: Communist Post-Communist Stud.

Indexing
- ISSN: 0967-067X (print); 1873-6920 (web)

Links
- Journal homepage

Communist and Post-Communist Studies (CPCS) is a peer-reviewed academic journal that covers research on communist and post-communist political systems, movements, and societies. It publishes work on both historical and contemporary developments in countries that have experienced or continue to experience communist rule, as well as comparative analyses of socialist and post-socialist transformations. The journal is published by the University of California Press since 1962.

== History ==
Previously published as Communist Affairs (1962–1968) and Studies in Comparative Communism (1968–1992), it became Communist and Post-Communist Studies following the collapse of the Soviet Union and the end of communist regimes in Eastern Europe. The name change reflected an expansion of the journal's focus from comparative studies of communist systems to the broader field of post-communist transformation.

== Abstracting and indexing ==
Communist and Post-Communist Studies is indexed and abstracted in the following databases:

- Social Sciences Citation Index
- Scopus
- EBSCOhost
- ProQuest
- International Political Science Abstracts

== See also ==
- Problems of Post-Communism
