= Iran–America Society =

International cooperation organization

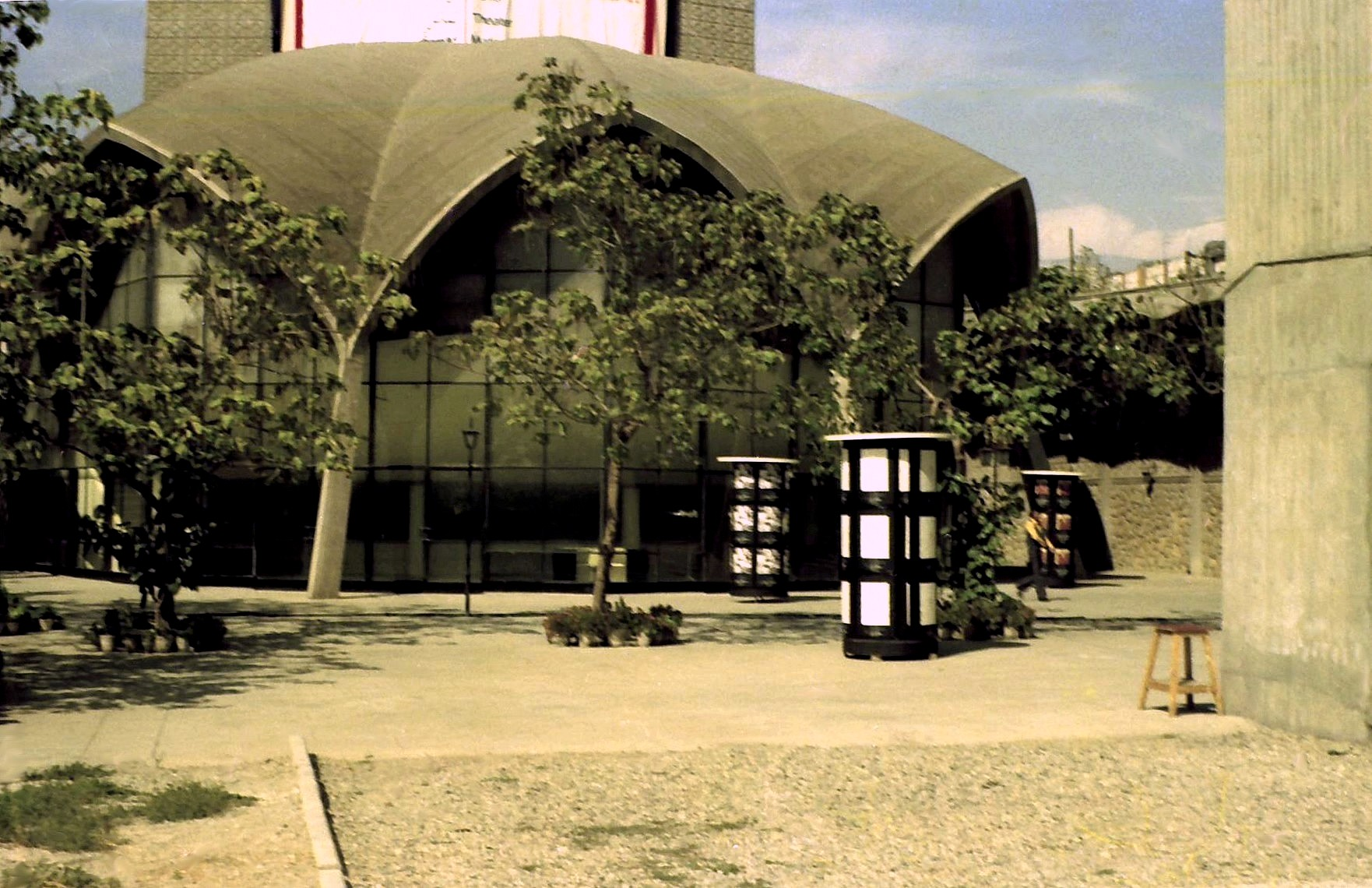
The Iran-American Society Cultural Center in Tehran

The Iran–America Society was founded in the 1950s in Tehran, Iran to promote understanding between the people of Iran and the people of the United States of America. The founding Chairman of the Board was Ralph E. Becket. David Nalle was one of its early directors. The Iran-American Society's office in Washington, DC arranged educational exchanges for Iranian students. The Society's cultural center in Tehran became a gathering place for Iranian students and intellectuals in the 1960s, who were drawn by the liberalizing influence of American culture on Iran. A second branch was founded in Isfahan a few years later as well as a third in Mashad. All three centers included English language schools. The Iran–America Society also had a branch in Shiraz. The society sponsored an exhibit of Iranian art and cultural artifacts which toured the United States in 1964.

The Cultural Center in Tehran was bombed in 1978 as part of the uprising against the Shah. The Cultural Centers in Tehran and Isfahan were both closed in November 1979, when the attack on the US Embassy occurred. The last IAS director in Tehran, Kathryn Koob, was held hostage at the US Embassy for 444 days.

In 1970, Richard Gilbert wrote:

"The cultural headquarters of the Iran America Society (IAS) was a modernistic domed structure in the northern part of the city, up Television Street, where the TV and radio studios and transmitters were located. The aims of the Society seemed many and varied to us but it was officially to promote understanding and cultural bonds between the two relevant nations. It was obviously solidly supported by US Government funds, closely attached to the Peace Corps and the diplomatic service, while some other rather clandestine activities may have operated under its cover. They ran classes in English and other subjects, held public exhibitions and educational films, had an amateur dramatics group and a host of other activities. The IAS building became a social hub for Iranian students and various international young folk who were in town. We were to visit the place quite frequently during our time in the city and it soon became apparent that many people associated with the IAS were in the US armed forces, which suggested that perhaps the Society was a useful facade for US intelligence activities."
