= Central Asia Monitor =

Defunct American magazine

Central Asia Monitor was in publication from 1992 to 2001. The journal focused on historical and current events in the five former Soviet Republics of Central Asia: Kazakhstan, Kyrgyzstan, Tajikistan, Turkmenistan and Uzbekistan. Its founder and editor-in-chief was Valery Chalidze. The journal was published bimonthly. Its primary editor was David Nalle. The bi-monthly journal was published out of Fair Haven, Vermont and its now defunct url was www.chalidze.com/cam.htm. Its ISSN is 1062–2314.

Central Asia Monitor was an important publication for Central Asian Studies during the 1990s. It began publication one year after the Central Asian Republics gained independence. The top scholars in the field published their works in the journal and it helped revived Central Asian Studies, a field of study that had been in decline for the previous half century.
