= Problems of Post-Communism =

- Discipline: Political science
- Language: English

Publication details
- Former name: Problems of Communism (1952–1992)
- History: 1952–present
- Publisher: Taylor and Francis
- Frequency: Bimonthly
- Impact factor: 2.127 (2020)

Standard abbreviations
- ISO 4: Probl. Post-Communism

Indexing
- ISSN: 1075-8216 (print); 1557-783X (web)
- LCCN: 95659082
- OCLC no.: 863051164

Links
- Journal homepage; Online access; Online archive

Problems of Post-Communism is a bimonthly peer-reviewed academic journal covering economic, political, security, and international developments in post-communist countries. Until 1992 it was known as Problems of Communism. It was originally published by the United States Information Agency and is now published by Routledge. The editor-in-chief is Dmitry P. Gorenburg (Harvard University).

== Abstracting and indexing ==
The journal is abstracted and indexed in Current Contents/Social and Behavioral Sciences, ProQuest, Scopus, Social Sciences Citation Index, Sociological Abstracts, and Worldwide Political Science Abstracts. According to the Journal Citation Reports, the journal has a 2020 impact factor of 2.127 in the category "Political Science".

== See also ==
- Europe-Asia Studies
- East European Politics and Societies
- Central Asian Survey
