= Central Asian Survey =

- Discipline: Central Asian studies
- Language: English
- Edited by: Rico Isaacs/Alexander Morrison

Publication details
- History: 1982-present
- Publisher: Routledge
- Frequency: Quarterly

Standard abbreviations
- ISO 4: Cent. Asian Surv.

Indexing
- ISSN: 0263-4937
- LCCN: 86641151
- OCLC no.: 645290357

Links
- Journal homepage

Central Asian Survey is an academic journal first published in 1982 concerning Caucasus and Central Asian studies. It is published by Taylor & Francis, and has four issues a year.

According to the editorial staff,

"The central aim of the journal is to reflect and promote advances in area-based scholarship in the social sciences and humanities and enhance understanding of processes of local and regional change that make Central Asia and the Caucasus an area of significant contemporary interest."

The editor is Rico Isaacs, the associate editor is Alexander Morrison and the book editor is Russell Zanca. Deniz Kandiyoti is the Editor Emeritus. Other scholars serving on the editorial board include Alexander Cooley, Nargis Kassenova, Erica Marat, Nick Megoran, Madeleine Reeves, Mohira Suyarkulova and Edward Schatz among others. The journal's international advisory board also includes Thomas Barfield, Judith Beyer, Regine Spector, and John Heathershaw, among others.

Several members of the editorial and international advisory boards are also members of the Central Eurasian Studies Society.

== See also ==
- Slavic Review
- East European Politics and Societies
