= East European Politics =

- Discipline: Political science, European studies, Area studies, International relations
- Language: English
- Edited by: Adam Fagan, Petr Kopecky, Lenka Bustikova, Andrea L. P. Pirro, Maria Spirova

Publication details
- Former names: Journal of Communist Studies (1984–1991); Journal of Communist Studies and Transition Politics (1992–2011)
- History: 1984–present
- Publisher: Routledge (Taylor & Francis Group)
- Frequency: Quarterly

Standard abbreviations
- ISO 4: East Eur. Politics

Indexing
- ISSN: 2159-9165 (print); 2159-9173 (web)
- OCLC no.: 701552682

Links
- Journal homepage; Journal Twitter page

East European Politics is a peer-reviewed academic journal covering the government, politics and societies of the post-communist space, including East Central Europe, the Baltic republics, South Eastern Europe, Russia, and all the countries of the former Soviet Union. It is published quarterly (4 issues per year) by Routledge (Taylor & Francis Group).

East European Politics publishes research on political developments, cross-country comparisons, and the post-communist region's connections to the wider world, along with thematic issues, symposiums, and review essays. All articles are peer-reviewed through editor screening and anonymized evaluation by at least two referees.

== History ==
The Journal of Communist Studies was founded in 1984 by a group of scholars (Note: Michael Waller, Richard Gillespie, Ron Hill, David Goodman, David Bell, and Michael Williams) with a shared intellectual interest in communist political systems, successors to an editorial team that had produced Documents in communist affairs (published in the early 1980s by Butterworths) and other publications dealing with the communist movement.

While the journal set out to reflect the growing complexity of the communist world and movements, in the 1980s, its focus was on the ‘core’ countries and parties that had historically been part of the world of the Communist International. The primary emphasis was on politics, but history, sociology, non-technical economics, biography, and comparative studies also featured.

In 1992, the title was changed to Journal of Communist Studies and Transition Politics to reflect changing realities. Following the change of title, the scope both widened, to embrace regime change and democratisation, and in practice also narrowed, to concentrate somewhat more on political analysis. The volumes published under the revised title included analyses of the politics and political science of the new democracies, several of which are now considered to be seminal works.

Since 2012, the journal is published under the current title.

== Editorial team ==
The editorial team consists of Senior Editors Adam Fagan (King's College London) and Petr Kopecky (Leiden University), Editors Lenka Bustikova (Arizona State University), Andrea L. P. Pirro (Scuola Normale Superiore) and Maria Spirova (Leiden University), as well as Editorial Assistant David Gazsi (King's College London).

== Abstracting and indexing ==
Articles appearing in the journal are abstracted and indexed in Scopus, EBSCOhost including International Political Science Abstracts Database, Political Science Complete, International Security & Counter Terrorism Reference Center and Public Affairs Index; Periodicals Index Online, CSA Worldwide Political Science Abstracts, Environmental Sciences and Pollution Management, International Bibliography of the Social Sciences and Sociological Abstracts (Online), among others.

== See also ==
- List of political science journals
- List of international relations journals
