= David Nalle =

American diplomat (1924–2013)

David Nalle (November 2, 1924 – August 2, 2013) was an American diplomat, writer and lecturer. He was the editor of the Central Asia Monitor.

== Biography ==
Born on November 2, 1924, in Philadelphia, Nalle interrupted studies in Engineering at Princeton University for World War II, during which he served as a Naval Aviator. He returned to complete a degree in English after the war.

In 1951, Nalle joined the United States Information Agency (USIA), assigned to the Middle East desk and eventually Afghanistan. During the 1960s he was posted in Iran, Syria and Jordan. He developed a reputation as a linguist and expert on Central Asia and the Middle East. While in Iran he also served as director of the Iran-America Society. He returned to the United States to head the USIA's division for the Near East, South Asia and North Africa in the late 1960s and early 1970s. Later, he was posted to Moscow as Press and Cultural Affairs Officer. After his tour in Moscow, he returned to his prior supervisory position at USIA. He served a total of 28 years with the USIA.

During and after his tour in Moscow, at the end of the Brezhnev regime, he and wife Peggy Nalle played helped Russian dissident artists organize shows in Moscow. They helped get their work out of the Soviet Union for shows in the United States and Europe. They also helped some dissident artists emigrate from Russia.

After retiring from USIA in 1980, Nalle became founding director of the Alfred Friendly Press Fellowship, a position which he held for nearly 10 years (1983–1992), overlapping with his position as Washington editor of the Central Asia Monitor (1993–2002). He wrote on Middle East and Central Asian affairs for Middle East Journal and Middle East Policy. He served as chairman emeritus of the Nava'i Lecture in Central Asian Studies at Georgetown University and taught courses on Central Asia at OLLI/American University. He served on the National Advisory Committees of the Middle East Policy Council and the Alfred Friendly Foundation.

In 1950, he married Jane Oliver Nalle (May 16, 1927 – June 8, 1952) who died in Afghanistan, aged 25, and was buried in Kabul British Cemetery.

He married Margaret Shumaker Nalle (Peggy Nalle), of Washington and had two children.

Nalle died of prostate cancer on August 2, 2013, aged 88.

== Works ==
- A Common Ground Video on Islam and the West, 1987.
- Report on Survey of Ferghana Valley in 1999.
- Listing of articles and reviews at the Middle East Policy Council.
