= East European Politics and Societies =

Journal of politics and society in Eastern Europe

- Language: English
- Edited by: James Krapfl, Lavinia Stan

Publication details
- Former names: East European Politics and Societies and Cultures (2012-2024)
- History: 1986–present
- Publisher: SAGE Publications
- Frequency: Quarterly
- Impact factor: 0.7 (2023)

Standard abbreviations
- ISO 4: East Eur. Politics Soc.

Indexing
- ISSN: 0888-3254 (print); 1533-8371 (web)
- LCCN: 87649452
- OCLC no.: 13538372

Links
- Journal homepage; Online access; Online archive

East European Politics and Societies (EEPS) is a peer-reviewed, interdisciplinary academic journal devoted to politics, histories, cultures, and societies of the area between Germany to the west and Russia to the east. The journal's editors-in-chief is James Krapfl (McGill University) and Lavinia Stan (St. Francis Xavier University). It was established in 1986 and is currently published by SAGE Publications.

== History ==
The journal originated as a Cold War project of the Joint Committee on Eastern Europe, which was funded by the U.S. Department of State to promote research and language training on Soviet bloc countries (including the Baltics) except the Soviet Union.

The co-editors of EEPS from 2004 to 2012, Ivo Banac and Irena Grudzińska Gross, added "and Cultures" to the journal's title (East European Politics and Societies and Cultures) in 2012. Wendy Bracewell and Krzysztof Jasiewicz were co-editors from 2013 to 2023.

From its first issue in December 1986 until December 2023, the journal EEPS had been sponsored by the American Council of Learned Societies (ACLS). In response to the end of ACLS sponsorship, the new EEPS Foundation, Inc. came into existence on January 1, 2024.

== Abstracting and indexing ==
East European Politics and Societies is abstracted and indexed in Scopus, Social Sciences Citation Index, America: History and Life, Historical Abstracts, International Political Science Abstracts, CSA Worldwide Political Science Abstracts, ProQuest, and Sociological Abstracts. According to the Journal Citation Reports, its 2023 impact factor is 0.7.

== See also ==
- Slavic Review
- Central Asian Survey
