= Europe-Asia Studies =

- Discipline: studies of the Soviet bloc
- Language: English
- Edited by: Luca Anceschi (since 2015) and David Smith (since 2002)

Publication details
- Former name: Soviet Studies (1949–1992)
- History: 1949–present
- Publisher: Routledge
- Frequency: 10/year
- Impact factor: 2.102 (2020)

Standard abbreviations
- ISO 4: Eur.-Asia Stud.

Indexing
- CODEN: EASTER
- ISSN: 0966-8136 (print); 1465-3427 (web)
- LCCN: 93645761
- JSTOR: 09668136
- OCLC no.: 760957849

Links
- Journal homepage; Online access; Online archive

Europe-Asia Studies is an academic peer-reviewed journal published 10 times a year by Routledge on behalf of the Institute of Central and East European Studies, University of Glasgow, and continuing (since vol. 45, 1993) the journal Soviet Studies (vols. 1–44, 1949–1992), which was renamed after the dissolution of the Soviet Union. The journal focuses on political, economic and social affairs of the countries of the former Soviet bloc and their successors, as well as their history in the 20th century.

Both Europe-Asia Studies and Soviet Studies are available online with subscription via JSTOR from 1949 to 2016 with a 7-year moving wall (updated 1 year ago). The full collection of 76 volumes published from 1949 to 2024 can be accessed on Taylor & Francis.

== See also ==
- Central Asian Survey
- East European Politics and Societies
- Problems of Post-Communism
