= Slavic Review =

- Discipline: Slavic studies
- Language: English
- Edited by: Eugene Avrutin

Publication details
- Former names: Slavonic Year-Book: American Series; Slavonic and East European Review: American Series; American Slavic and East European Review
- History: 1941–present
- Publisher: Cambridge University Press for the Association for Slavic, East European, and Eurasian Studies (United States)
- Frequency: Quarterly

Standard abbreviations
- ISO 4: Slav. Rev.

Indexing
- ISSN: 0037-6779
- LCCN: 47006565
- JSTOR: 00376779
- OCLC no.: 818900629

Links
- Journal homepage

The Slavic Review is a major peer-reviewed academic journal publishing scholarly studies, book and film reviews, and review essays in all disciplines concerned with "Eastern Europe, Russia, the Caucasus, and Central Asia, past and present". The journal's title, though pointing to its roots in Slavic studies, does not fully encompass the range of disciplines represented or peoples and cultures examined.

== History ==
The journal has been published quarterly under the current name since 1961 by the American Association for the Advancement of Slavic Studies, which since 2010 was named Association for Slavic, East European, and Eurasian Studies (ASEEES). ASEEES continued the series published by the same association since 1941 under different names: Slavonic Year-Book. American Series (1941), Slavonic and East European Review. American Series (1943–1944), American Slavic and East European Review (1945–1961). Under the current name, the subtitle of the journal has changed over the years to reflect changing terminologies about the region, evolving boundaries and relations, and developing conceptions of the field.

Since 2006, the subtitle has been Interdisciplinary Quarterly of Russian, Eurasian, and East European Studies. Cambridge University Press became the publisher in 2017.

From 1996 to 2006, the editor-in-chief was Diane P. Koenker (University of Illinois at Urbana-Champaign). Mark D. Steinberg (University of Illinois at Urbana-Champaign) served as editor from 2006 to 2013. Harriet Murav was editor from August 2013 to August 2023. The current editor is Eugene M. Avrutin, also faculty at the University of Illinois at Urbana-Champaign.

All back issues of the journal are available electronically through JSTOR. Electronic versions of current and recent issues are available to members on the website of the Association for Slavic, East European, and Eurasian Studies.

== Abstracting and indexing ==
The journal is abstracted and indexed in the American Bibliography of Slavic and East European Studies, Social Sciences Citation Index, Historical Abstracts, Arts and Humanities Citation Index, and the Linguistic Bibliography.

== See also ==
- List of Slavic studies journals
- The Polish Review
- Sarmatian Review
