= Bibliography of Russian and Soviet science: Space programs =

Bibliography of works about Russian and Soviet technology

This is a select bibliography of academic level English language books (including translations) and journal articles, published about the non-military space programs in Russia and the Soviet Union. (Note: For information about military space based assets and programs, see Bibliography of Russian and Soviet science (Military technology).)

For other areas of science and technology, please see:

Works listed here are cited in the notes or bibliographies of scholarly sources. Each is published by an academic or major press, written by a recognized expert, or substantially reviewed in scholarly journals; borderline cases are omitted. A selection of primary sources are included. Many of the books below carry their own bibliographies; see the Further reading section for other bibliographies, and the External links section for historical sites, academic sites, and museums.

Citations follow APA style. (Note: Entries are in plain text APA 7 format without templates; templates are used only for reviews and notes.) Book have citations to academic journal or mainstream published reviews when available. For books only partly about the subject, relevant chapter or section titles are provided when useful and available. Translators of the original-language edition are included when possible. In cases where a title or name has appeared with more than one English spelling, the most recent published form is used and a footnote documents any earlier title under which the work appeared.

== General ==
The Soviet space program (Russian: Космическая программа СССР, romanized: Kosmicheskaya programma SSSR) was the state space program of the Soviet Union, active from 1951 until the dissolution of the Soviet Union in 1991.

The State Corporation for Space Activities "Roscosmos", commonly known simply as Roscosmos (Роскосмос), is a state corporation of the Russian Federation responsible for space flights, cosmonautics programs, and aerospace research.

- Andrews, J. T. (2009). Storming the stratosphere: Space exploration, Soviet culture, and the arts from Lenin to Khrushchev's times. Russian History, 36(1), 77–87.
- Andrews, J. T., & Siddiqi, A. A. (Eds.). (2011). Into the cosmos: Space exploration and Soviet culture. University of Pittsburgh Press.
- Brain, S. (2014). How the Soviets explored the cosmic void and found ... nothing. Kritika: Explorations in Russian and Eurasian History, 15(2), 458–465.
- Cornish, G. (2019). Music and the making of the cosmonaut everyman. The Journal of Musicology, 36(4), 464–497.
- Gerovitch, S. (2007). "New Soviet man" inside machine: Human engineering, spacecraft design, and the construction of communism. Osiris, 22(1), 135–157.
- Gerovitch, S. (2008). Stalin's rocket designers' leap into space: The technical intelligentsia faces the thaw. Osiris, 23(1), 189–209.
- Gerovitch, S. (2011). "Why are we telling lies?" The creation of Soviet space history myths. The Russian Review, 70(3), 460–484.
- Gerovitch, S. (2014). Voices of the Soviet space program: Cosmonauts, soldiers, and engineers who took the USSR into space. Palgrave Macmillan.
- Gerovitch, S. (2015). Soviet space mythologies: Public images, private memories, and the making of a cultural identity. University of Pittsburgh Press.
- Griswold, R. L. (2012). "Russian blonde in space": Soviet women in the American imagination, 1950–1965. Journal of Social History, 45(4), 881–907.
- Harford, J. (1997). Korolev: How one man masterminded the Soviet drive to beat America to the Moon. John Wiley & Sons.
- Harvey, B. (2007). Russian planetary exploration: History, development, legacy and prospects. Springer. doi:10.1007/978-0-387-49664-1
- Harvey, B. (2007). Soviet and Russian lunar exploration. Springer-Praxis.
- Huntress, W. T., Jr., & Marov, M. Ya. (2011). Soviet robots in the solar system: Mission technologies and discoveries. Springer.
- Jenks, A. (2020). Securitization and secrecy in the late Cold War: The view from space. Kritika: Explorations in Russian and Eurasian History, 21(3), 659–689.
- McDougall, W. A. (1985). ...the heavens and the earth: A political history of the space age. Basic Books.
- Siddiqi, A. A. (2000). Challenge to Apollo: The Soviet Union and the space race, 1945–1974. NASA History Division.
- Siddiqi, A. A. (2010). Competing technologies, national(ist) narratives, and universal claims: Toward a global history of space exploration. Technology and Culture, 51(2), 425–443.
- Siddiqi, A. A. (2010). The red rockets' glare: Spaceflight and the Russian imagination, 1857–1957. Cambridge University Press.
- Ulivi, P., & Harland, D. M. (2009). Robotic exploration of the solar system, Part 2: Hiatus and renewal, 1983–1996. Springer. doi:10.1007/978-0-387-78905-7
- Waldrop, M. M. (1987). Soviet space science opens to the West. Science, 236(4807), 1427–1431.
- Waldrop, M. M. (1989). A new Soviet plan for exploring the planets. Science, 246(4927), 211–212.

== Programs and missions ==
=== Dnepropetrovsk Sputnik ===
Dnepropetrovsk Sputnik (Russian: Днепропетровский Спутник; Ukrainian: Дніпропетровський супутник), or DS, was a series of satellites launched by the Soviet Union between 1961 and 1982. They served missions ranging from technological and scientific research to radar tracking targets for anti-satellite weapons and anti-ballistic missiles. 185 were launched on dedicated Kosmos rockets.

- Gubka, O., & Savchuk, V. (2020). The Dnepropetrovsk Space Center: From ballistic missiles to international cooperation under the Interkosmos program. Kwartalnik Historii Nauki i Techniki, 65(3), 29–58.
- Krasnoperov, R., Peregoudov, D., Lukianova, R., Soloviev, A., & Dzeboev, B. (2020). Early Soviet satellite magnetic field measurements in the years 1964 and 1970. Earth System Science Data, 12(1), 555–561.
- Lardier, C. (2024). Yuzhnoye launchers and satellites. ISTE; Wiley.
- Siddiqi, A. A. (2000). Challenge to Apollo: The Soviet Union and the space race, 1945–1974 (NASA SP-2000-4408). National Aeronautics and Space Administration.
- Soloviev, A. A., & Peregoudov, D. V. (2022). Verification of the geomagnetic field models using historical satellite measurements obtained in 1964 and 1970. Earth, Planets and Space, 74, Article 187.

=== Luna ===
The Luna programme (Луна, "Moon"), sometimes called Lunik by western media, was a series of robotic spacecraft missions sent to the Moon by the Soviet Union between 1959 and 1976. Designed as orbiters or landers, they achieved many firsts in space exploration—including the first lunar flyby, first lunar impact, and first photos of the Moon's far side—and studied the Moon's chemical composition, gravity, temperature, and radiation. Twenty-four spacecraft were formally given the Luna designation, though more were launched: those failing to reach orbit went unacknowledged and unnumbered, while those failing in low Earth orbit usually received Cosmos designations. The programme's estimated 1964 cost was US$6–10 billion (equivalent to US$46–77 billion in 2024). The Luna 25 mission continues the Luna designation, though it—along with planned missions Luna 26, Luna 27, and Luna 28—is considered part of the Luna-Glob programme.

- Basilevsky, A. T., Kreslavsky, M. A., Karachevtseva, I. P., & Gusakova, E. N. (2014). Morphometry of small impact craters in the Lunokhod-1 and Lunokhod-2 study areas. Planetary and Space Science, 92, 77–87.
- Clark, P. S. (1991). The Soviet manned lunar programme and its legacy. Space Policy, 7(3), 221–232.
- Harvey, B. (2007a). The first moon probes. In Soviet and Russian lunar exploration (pp. 15–43). Springer.
- Harvey, B. (2007b). Origins of the Soviet lunar programme. In Soviet and Russian lunar exploration (pp. 1–13). Springer.
- Harvey, B. (2007c). Soviet and Russian lunar exploration. Springer.
- Huntress, W. T., Jr., & Marov, M. Ya. (2011). Soviet robots in the solar system: Mission technologies and discoveries. Springer.
- Karachevtseva, I., Oberst, J., Scholten, F., Konopikhin, A., Shingareva, K., Cherepanova, E., Gusakova, E., Haase, I., Peters, O., Plescia, J., & Robinson, M. (2013). Cartography of the Lunokhod-1 landing site and traverse from LRO image and stereo-topographic data. Planetary and Space Science, 85, 175–187.
- Lardier, C. (2018). The Soviet manned lunar program N1-L3. Acta Astronautica, 142, 184–192.
- Robinson, M. S., Plescia, J. B., Jolliff, B. L., & Lawrence, S. J. (2012). Soviet lunar sample return missions: Landing site identification and geologic context. Planetary and Space Science, 69(1), 76–88.
- Shearer, C. K., Moriarty, D. P., Simon, S. B., Petro, N., & Papike, J. J. (2023). Where is the lunar mantle and deep crust at Crisium? A perspective from the Luna 20 samples. Journal of Geophysical Research: Planets, 128(5), Article e2022JE007409.
- Shkuratov, Y., Kaydash, V., Sysolyatina, X., Razim, A., & Videen, G. (2013). Lunar surface traces of engine jets of Soviet sample return probes: The enigma of the Luna-23 and Luna-24 landing sites. Planetary and Space Science, 75, 28–36.
- Siddiqi, A. A. (2000). Challenge to Apollo: The Soviet Union and the space race, 1945–1974 (NASA SP-2000-4408). National Aeronautics and Space Administration.

=== Luna-Glob ===
Luna-Glob (Russian: Луна-Глоб, "Lunar sphere") is a Moon exploration program by Roscosmos aimed at creating a fully robotic lunar base, after which it is intended to continue with crewed missions beginning with the Orel crewed orbiter.

Based on plans dating to 1997, the program's first mission—the Luna 25 lander—was shelved after the 1998 Russian financial crisis and revived a few years later. Initially scheduled to launch in 2012 on a Soyuz-2 rocket, it was repeatedly delayed—to 2014, 2015, 2016, 2018, and 2019. Roscosmos approved a model of the Luna 25 lander in 2017.

Luna 25 launched successfully on 11 August 2023 but crashed on 19 August after an anomalous orbit-lowering maneuver. As of February 2026, Luna 26 is planned for 2028, Luna 27 for 2029–2030, Luna 29 for 2032, Luna 28 for 2034, and Luna 30 for 2036. The planned Moon base would initially house no more than 4 people, later rising to a maximum of 12.

- Djachkova, M. V., Litvak, M. L., Mitrofanov, I. G., & Sanin, A. B. (2017). Selection of Luna-25 landing sites in the south polar region of the Moon. Solar System Research, 51(3), 185–195. doi:10.1134/S0038094617030029
- Djachkova, M. V., Mitrofanov, I. G., Sanin, A. B., Litvak, M. L., & Tretyakov, V. I. (2022). Selecting a landing site for the Luna 27 spacecraft. Solar System Research, 56(3), 145–154. doi:10.1134/S0038094622030029
- Golovin, D. V., Mokrousov, M. I., Mitrofanov, I. G., Kozyrev, A. S., Litvak, M. L., Malakhov, A. V., Nikiforov, S. Yu., Sanin, A. B., Barmakov, Yu. N., Bogolubov, E. P., Sholeninov, S. E., & Yurkov, D. I. (2021). ADRON-LR instrument for active neutron sensing of the lunar matter composition. Solar System Research, 55(6), 529–536. doi:10.1134/S0038094621060046
- Ivanov, M. A., Hiesinger, H., Abdrakhimov, A. M., Basilevsky, A. T., Head, J. W., Pasckert, J.-H., Bauch, K., van der Bogert, C. H., Gläser, P., & Kohanov, A. (2015). Landing site selection for Luna-Glob mission in crater Boguslawsky. Planetary and Space Science, 117, 45–63. doi:10.1016/j.pss.2015.05.007
- Ivanov, M. A., Marov, M. Ya., Basilevsky, A. T., & Kostitsyn, Yu. A. (2018). Boguslawsky crater on the Moon: Landing site selection for the Luna–Glob mission descent module. Solar System Research, 52(7), 570–577. doi:10.1134/S0038094618070110
- Krasilnikov, S. S., Basilevsky, A. T., Ivanov, M. A., & Krasilnikov, A. S. (2021). Geological and geomorphological characteristics of high-priority landing sites for the Luna-Glob mission. Solar System Research, 55(2), 83–96. doi:10.1134/S0038094621010056
- Krasilnikov, S. S., Krasilnikov, A. S., & Ivanov, M. A. (2022). Geological details of the main landing ellipses of Luna-25. Solar System Research, 56(3), 135–144. doi:10.1134/S0038094622020058
- Litvak, M., Kozlova, T., Ilyin, A., Kiselev, A., Kozyrev, A., Mitrofanov, I., Tretyakov, V., & Yakovlev, V. (2022). Luna-25 robotic arm: Results of experiment with analog of lunar regolith in lunar-like conditions. Acta Astronautica, 200, 282–290. doi:10.1016/j.actaastro.2022.08.003
- Mantsevich, S. N., Dobrolenskiy, Yu. S., Evdokimova, N. A., Korablev, O. I., Kalinnikov, Yu. K., Vyazovetskiy, N. A., Dzyuban, I. A., Sapgir, A. G., Stepanov, A. V., Titov, A. Yu., Aleksandrov, K. V., Bondarenko, A. V., Dokuchaev, I. V., Knyazev, M. G., Dokuchaev, A. Ya., & Kulakov, F. V. (2021). Lunar infrared spectrometer with TV support of the robotic arm working zone (LIS-TV-RPM). Solar System Research, 55(6), 537–549. doi:10.1134/S0038094621060071
- Mitrofanov, I. G., Zelenyi, L. M., Tretyakov, V. I., & Kalashnikov, D. V. (2021). Luna-25: The first polar mission to the Moon. Solar System Research, 55(6), 485–495. doi:10.1134/S0038094621060095
- Slyuta, E. (2021). The Luna program. In A. Longobardo (Ed.), Sample return missions (pp. 37–78). Elsevier. doi:10.1016/B978-0-12-818330-4.00003-3
- Turchinskaya, O. I., & Slyuta, E. N. (2024). Landing site choice for Luna-27 mission in the Moon south polar region. Acta Astronautica, 222, 346–358. doi:10.1016/j.actaastro.2024.06.011
- Zakharov, A. V., Dol'nikov, G. G., Kuznetsov, I. A., Lyash, A. N., Dubov, A. E., Afonin, V. V., Bednyakov, S. A., Bychkova, A. S., Grushin, V. A., Dokuchaev, I. V., Kartasheva, A. A., Popel, S. I., Shashkova, I. A., Shekhovtsova, A. V., Yakovlev, A. V., Vasiliev, M. M., Lisin, E. A., Petrov, O. F., Borisov, N. D., & Zelenyi, L. M. (2021). PmL instrument onboard Luna-25 lander: Plasma–dust measurements in the surface exosphere. Solar System Research, 55(6), 576–587. doi:10.1134/S0038094621060125

=== Orel ===
Orel (Russian: Орёл, lit. 'Eagle') or Oryol, formerly Federation (Russian: Федерация, romanized: Federatsiya) and PPTS (Russian: Перспективная Пилотируемая Транспортная Система, romanized: Perspektivnaya Pilotiruemaya Transportnaya Sistema, lit. 'Prospective Piloted Transport System'), is a Roscosmos project to develop a new-generation, partially reusable crewed spacecraft. Until 2016 its official name was PTK NP (Russian: Пилотируемый Транспортный Корабль Нового Поколения, lit. 'New Generation Piloted Transport Ship').

The project aims to produce a next-generation spacecraft to replace the Soviet-era Soyuz for low Earth orbit and lunar operations, similar in function to the US Orion or Commercial Crew Development spacecraft.

- Harvey, B. (2021). European-Russian space cooperation: From de Gaulle to ExoMars. Springer. doi:10.1007/978-3-030-67686-5
- Zak, A. (2013). Russia in space: The past explained, the future explored. Apogee Prime.

=== Resurs-DK No.1 ===
Resurs-DK No.1, also called Resurs-DK1, was a commercial Earth observation satellite operated by NTs OMZ, the Russian Research Center for Earth Operative Monitoring. Designed for multi-spectral remote sensing of the Earth's surface, it transmitted high-resolution visible imagery (up to 0.9 m) to ground stations in near real-time via radio link, delivering value-added processed data to a wide range of consumers.

- Adriani, O., et al. (2014). The PAMELA mission: Heralding a new era in precision cosmic ray physics. Physics Reports, 544(4), 323–370.
- Adriani, O., et al. (2017). Ten years of PAMELA in space. La Rivista del Nuovo Cimento, 40(10), 473–522.
- Casolino, M., et al. (2008a). Launch and commissioning of the PAMELA experiment on board the Resurs-DK1 satellite. Advances in Space Research, 41(12), 2064–2070.
- Casolino, M., et al. (2008b). The PAMELA experiment: A space-borne observatory for heliospheric phenomena. Advances in Space Research, 41(12), 2043–2049.
- Picozza, P., et al. (2007). PAMELA – A payload for antimatter matter exploration and light-nuclei astrophysics. Astroparticle Physics, 27(4), 296–315.

=== Sputnik ===
Sputnik 1 (/ˈspʌtnɪk, ˈspʊtnɪk/, Russian: Спутник-1, Satellite 1), often referred to as simply Sputnik, was the first artificial Earth satellite. It was launched into an elliptical low Earth orbit by the Soviet Union on 4 October 1957 as part of the Soviet space program. It sent a radio signal back to Earth for three weeks before its three silver-zinc batteries became depleted. Aerodynamic drag caused it to fall back into the atmosphere on 4 January, 1958.

- Andrews, J. T. (2011). Getting ready for Khrushchev's Sputnik: Russian popular culture and national markers at the dawn of the space age. In J. T. Andrews & A. A. Siddiqi (Eds.), Into the cosmos: Space exploration and Soviet culture (pp. 28–46). University of Pittsburgh Press.
- Balzer, H. (2011). The social construction of Sputnik. Technology and Culture, 52(3), 614–617. doi:10.1353/tech.2011.0115
- Brzezinski, M. (2007). Red moon rising: Sputnik and the hidden rivalries that ignited the space age. Times Books.
- Dick, S. J., & Launius, R. D. (Eds.). (2006). Critical issues in the history of spaceflight (NASA SP-2006-4702). National Aeronautics and Space Administration.
- Dickson, P. (2001). Sputnik: The shock of the century. Walker & Company.
- Divine, R. A. (1993). The Sputnik challenge: Eisenhower's response to the Soviet satellite. Oxford University Press.
- Gerovitch, S. (2007). "New Soviet man" inside machine: Human engineering, spacecraft design, and the construction of communism. Osiris, 22(1), 135–157. doi:10.1086/521746
- Gerovitch, S. (2008). Stalin's rocket designers' leap into space: The technical intelligentsia faces the thaw. Osiris, 23(1), 189–209. doi:10.1086/591874
- Gerovitch, S. (2011). The human inside a propaganda machine: The public image and professional identity of Soviet cosmonauts. In J. T. Andrews & A. A. Siddiqi (Eds.), Into the cosmos: Space exploration and Soviet culture (pp. 77–106). University of Pittsburgh Press.
- Gerovitch, S. (2011). "Why are we telling lies?" The creation of Soviet space history myths. The Russian Review, 70(3), 460–484. doi:10.1111/j.1467-9434.2011.00624.x
- Gerovitch, S. (2014). Voices of the Soviet space program: Cosmonauts, soldiers, and engineers who took the USSR into space. Palgrave Macmillan. doi:10.1057/9781137481795
- Gerovitch, S. (2015). Soviet space mythologies: Public images, private memories, and the making of a cultural identity. University of Pittsburgh Press.
- Harford, J. (1997). Korolev: How one man masterminded the Soviet drive to beat America to the Moon. John Wiley & Sons.
- Hatzivassiliou, E. (2020). The view from NATO: Sputnik as a catalyst, 1957–8. The International History Review, 42(6), 1137–1154. doi:10.1080/07075332.2019.1700543
- Launius, R. D. (2010). An unintended consequence of the IGY: Eisenhower, Sputnik, the founding of NASA. Acta Astronautica, 67(1–2), 254–263. doi:10.1016/j.actaastro.2009.10.019
- Launius, R. D., Logsdon, J. M., & Smith, R. W. (Eds.). (2000). Reconsidering Sputnik: Forty years since the Soviet satellite. Harwood Academic.
- Maurer, E., Richers, J., Rüthers, M., & Scheide, C. (Eds.). (2011). Soviet space culture: Cosmic enthusiasm in socialist societies. Palgrave Macmillan. doi:10.1057/9780230307049
- McDougall, W. A. (1985). ...the heavens and the earth: A political history of the space age. Basic Books.
- Mieczkowski, Y. (2013). Eisenhower's Sputnik moment: The race for space and world prestige. Cornell University Press.
- Nelson, A. (2011). Cold War celebrity and the courageous canine scout: The life and times of Soviet space dogs. In J. T. Andrews & A. A. Siddiqi (Eds.), Into the cosmos: Space exploration and Soviet culture (pp. 133–158). University of Pittsburgh Press.
- Siddiqi, A. A. (2000). Korolev, Sputnik, and the International Geophysical Year. In R. D. Launius, J. M. Logsdon, & R. W. Smith (Eds.), Reconsidering Sputnik: Forty years since the Soviet satellite (pp. 43–72). Harwood Academic.
- Siddiqi, A. A. (2003). Sputnik and the Soviet space challenge. University Press of Florida.
- Siddiqi, A. A. (2008). Sputnik 50 years later: New evidence on its origins. Acta Astronautica, 63(1–4), 529–539. doi:10.1016/j.actaastro.2007.12.042
- Siddiqi, A. A. (2010). The red rockets' glare: Spaceflight and the Russian imagination, 1857–1957. Cambridge University Press.
- Siddiqi, A. A. (2011). Cosmic contradictions: Popular enthusiasm and secrecy in the Soviet space program. In J. T. Andrews & A. A. Siddiqi (Eds.), Into the cosmos: Space exploration and Soviet culture (pp. 47–76). University of Pittsburgh Press.
- Siegelbaum, L. (2012). Sputnik goes to Brussels: The exhibition of a Soviet technological wonder. Journal of Contemporary History, 47(1), 120–136.
- Tokaty, G. A. (1963). Soviet rocket technology. Technology and Culture, 4(4), 515–528. JSTOR 3101384

=== TKS ===
The TKS spacecraft (Russian: Транспортный корабль снабжения, Transportnyi Korabl' Snabzheniia, lit. Transport Supply Spacecraft; GRAU index 11F72) was a Soviet spacecraft developed in the late 1960s to ferry crew, cargo, and fuel to the military Almaz space stations. It combined two independently operable parts: the VA spacecraft, a compact crew capsule for launch and re-entry, and the Functional Cargo Block (FGB), which carried cargo, docking hardware, and the main maneuvering engines, and could remain at the station after the VA returned to Earth. Though designed for both crewed and uncrewed flight, the TKS never entered operational service; of its four test flights, three docked with civilian Salyut stations. Its lasting legacy was the FGB design, which became the basis for station modules on Mir and the International Space Station.

- Baker, P. (2007). The story of manned space stations: An introduction. Springer.
- Chladek, J. (2017). Outposts on the frontier: A fifty-year history of space stations. University of Nebraska Press.
- Harland, D. M. (2005). The story of space station Mir. Springer.
- Ivanovich, G. S. (2008). From Almaz to Salyut. In Salyut – The first space station: Triumph and tragedy (pp. 1–30). Springer.
- Newkirk, D. (1990). Almanac of Soviet manned space flight. Gulf Publishing.
- Portree, D. S. F. (1995). Mir hardware heritage (NASA Reference Publication 1357). National Aeronautics and Space Administration.
- Siddiqi, A. A. (2001). The Almaz space station complex: A history, 1964–1992, part 1: 1964–1976. Journal of the British Interplanetary Society, 54(11/12), 389–416.
- Siddiqi, A. A. (2002). The Almaz space station complex: A history, 1964–1992, part 2: 1976–1992. Journal of the British Interplanetary Society, 55, 35–67.

=== Vega ===
The Vega program (Russian: Вега) was a series of Venus missions that also took advantage of the appearance of comet 1P/Halley in 1986. Vega 1 and Vega 2 were uncrewed spacecraft launched in a cooperative effort among the Soviet Union (who provided the spacecraft and launch vehicle) and European nations in December 1984. They had a two-part mission to investigate Venus, where each would release a lander and a balloon probe, and later conduct a flyby of Halley's Comet.

- Blamont, J. E., Young, R. E., Seiff, A., Ragent, B., Sagdeev, R. Z., Linkin, V. M., Kerzhanovich, V. V., Ingersoll, A. P., Crisp, D., Elson, L. S., Preston, R. A., Golitsyn, G. S., & Ivanov, V. N. (1986). Implications of the VEGA balloon results for Venus atmospheric dynamics. Science, 231(4744), 1422–1425. doi:10.1126/science.231.4744.1422
- Dolgopolov, V. P., Pichkhadze, K. M., & Sukhanov, K. G. (2012). The Vega project: A space mission to Venus and Halley's comet. Solar System Research, 46(7), 568–577. doi:10.1134/S0038094612070106
- Galeev, A. A., Gribov, B. E., Gombosi, T., Gringauz, K. I., Klimov, S. I., Oberz, P., Remizov, A. P., Riedler, W., Sagdeev, R. Z., Savin, S. P., Sokolov, A. Yu., Shapiro, V. D., Shevchenko, V. I., Szegő, K., Verigin, M. I., & Yeroshenko, Ye. G. (1986). Position and structure of the comet Halley bow shock: Vega-1 and Vega-2 measurements. Geophysical Research Letters, 13(8), 841–844. doi:10.1029/GL013i008p00841
- Gombosi, T. I. (1985). VEGA: En route to Venus and comet Halley. Eos, Transactions American Geophysical Union, 66(4), 33–36. doi:10.1029/EO066i004p00033-02
- Huntress, W. T., Jr., & Marov, M. Ya. (2011). The international Comet Halley campaign. In Soviet robots in the solar system: Mission technologies and discoveries (pp. 343–366). Springer. doi:10.1007/978-1-4419-7898-1_18
- Kremnev, R. S., Linkin, V. M., Lipatov, A. N., Pichkadze, K. M., Shurupov, A. A., Terterashvili, A. V., Bakitko, R. V., Blamont, J. E., Malique, C., Ragent, B., Preston, R. A., Elson, L. S., & Crisp, D. (1986). VEGA balloon system and instrumentation. Science, 231(4744), 1408–1411. doi:10.1126/science.231.4744.1408
- Preston, R. A., Hildebrand, C. E., Purcell, G. H., Jr., Ellis, J., Stelzried, C. T., Finley, S. G., Sagdeev, R. Z., Linkin, V. M., Kerzhanovich, V. V., Altunin, V. I., Kogan, L. R., Kostenko, V. I., Matveenko, L. I., Pogrebenko, S. V., Strukov, I. A., Akim, E. L., Alexandrov, Yu. N., Armand, N. A., Bakitko, R. N., . . . Petit, G. (1986). Determination of Venus winds by ground-based radio tracking of the VEGA balloons. Science, 231(4744), 1414–1416. doi:10.1126/science.231.4744.1414
- Sagdeev, R. Z. (1988). The Vega mission to Halley's Comet. In M. Grewing, F. Praderie, & R. Reinhard (Eds.), Exploration of Halley's Comet (pp. 959–964). Springer. doi:10.1007/978-3-642-82971-0_166
- Sagdeev, R. Z., Blamont, J., Galeev, A. A., Moroz, V. I., Shapiro, V. D., Shevchenko, V. I., & Szegő, K. (1986). Vega spacecraft encounters with comet Halley. Nature, 321(6067), 259–262. doi:10.1038/321259a0
- Sagdeev, R. Z., Linkin, V. M., Blamont, J. E., & Preston, R. A. (1986). The VEGA Venus balloon experiment. Science, 231(4744), 1407–1408. doi:10.1126/science.231.4744.1407
- Sagdeev, R. Z., Linkin, V. M., Kerzhanovich, V. V., Lipatov, A. N., Shurupov, A. A., Blamont, J. E., Crisp, D., Ingersoll, A. P., Elson, L. S., Preston, R. A., Hildebrand, C. E., Ragent, B., Seiff, A., Young, R. E., Petit, G., Boloh, L., Alexandrov, Yu. N., Armand, N. A., Bakitko, R. V., & Selivanov, A. S. (1986). Overview of VEGA Venus balloon in situ meteorological measurements. Science, 231(4744), 1411–1414. doi:10.1126/science.231.4744.1411
- Sagdeev, R. Z., Szabó, F., Avanesov, G. A., Cruvellier, P., Szabó, L., Szegő, K., Abergel, A., Balazs, A., Barinov, I. V., Bertaux, J.-L., Blamont, J., Detaille, M., Demarelis, E., Dul'nev, G. N., Endröczy, G., Gardos, M., Kanyo, M., Kostenko, V. I., Krasikov, V. A., . . . Zhukov, B. S. (1986). Television observations of comet Halley from Vega spacecraft. Nature, 321(6067), 262–266. doi:10.1038/321262a0

=== Venera ===
The Venera program (Russian: Вене́ра, pronounced [vʲɪˈnʲɛrə] 'Venus') was a series of space probes developed by the Soviet Union between 1961 and 1984 to gather information about the planet Venus. A total of eighteen probes were sent, including two related Vega probes.

Thirteen probes successfully entered the Venusian atmosphere, including the two Venera-Halley probes. Ten of those successfully landed on the surface of the planet. Due to the extreme conditions, the probes could only survive for a short period on the surface, from 23 minutes to two hours.

The Venera program established a number of precedents in space exploration, among them being the first man-made devices to enter the atmosphere of another planet (Venera 3 on 1 March 1966), the first to make a soft landing on another planet (Venera 7 on 15 December 1970), the first to return images from another planet's surface (Venera 9 on 8 June 1975), the first to record sounds on another planet (Venera 13 on 30 October 1981), and the first to perform high-resolution radar mapping scans (Venera 15 on 2 June 1983). The intense pressures that led to the short lifespans of many of the probes were themselves an important finding.

- Amato, M., & Williams, D. R. (2015). Accessing the Venus lower atmosphere and surface—From Venera and Pioneer Venus to VISE and VITaL. In V. Badescu & K. Zacny (Eds.), Inner solar system: Prospective energy and material resources (pp. 71–100). Springer.
- Barsukov, V. L., Basilevsky, A. T., Burba, G. A., Bobina, N. N., Kryuchkov, V. P., Kuzmin, R. O., Nikolaeva, O. V., Pronin, A. A., Ronca, L. B., Chernaya, I. M., Shashkina, V. P., Garanin, A. V., Kushky, E. R., Markov, M. S., Sukhanov, A. L., Kotelnikov, V. A., Rzhiga, O. N., Petrov, G. M., Alexandrov, Yu. N., ... Akim, E. L. (1986). The geology and geomorphology of the Venus surface as revealed by the radar images obtained by Veneras 15 and 16. Journal of Geophysical Research: Solid Earth, 91(B4), D378–D398.
- Eshleman, V. R., Fjeldbo, G., Anderson, J. D., Kliore, A., & Dyce, R. B. (1968). Venus: Lower atmosphere not measured. Science, 162(3854), 661–665.
- Florensky, C. P., Basilevsky, A. T., Kryuchkov, V. P., Kusmin, R. O., Nikolaeva, O. V., Pronin, A. A., Chernaya, I. M., Tyuflin, Yu. S., Selivanov, A. S., Naraeva, M. K., & Ronca, L. B. (1983). Venera 13 and Venera 14: Sedimentary rocks on Venus? Science, 221(4605), 57–59.
- Florensky, C. P., Ronca, L. B., Basilevsky, A. T., Burba, G. A., Nikolaeva, O. V., Pronin, A. A., Trakhtman, A. M., Volkov, V. P., & Zazetsky, V. V. (1977). The surface of Venus as revealed by Soviet Venera 9 and 10. Geological Society of America Bulletin, 88(11), 1537–1545.
- Garvin, J. B., Head, J. W., Zuber, M. T., & Helfenstein, P. (1984). Venus: The nature of the surface from Venera panoramas. Journal of Geophysical Research: Solid Earth, 89(B5), 3381–3399.
- Harvey, B. (2007). The first Mars, Venus probes. In Russian planetary exploration: History, development, legacy and prospects (pp. 43–80). Springer.
- Lacis, A. A., & Hansen, J. E. (1974). Atmosphere of Venus: Implications of Venera 8 sunlight measurements. Science, 184(4140), 979–982.
- Marov, M. Ya., & Grinspoon, D. H. (1998). The planet Venus. Yale University Press.
- Pieters, C. M., Head, J. W., Pratt, S., Patterson, W., Garvin, J., Barsukov, V. L., Basilevsky, A. T., Khodakovsky, I. L., Selivanov, A. S., Panfilov, A. S., Gektin, Yu. M., & Narayeva, Y. M. (1986). The color of the surface of Venus. Science, 234(4782), 1379–1383.
- Reese, D. E., & Swan, P. R. (1968). Venera 4 probes atmosphere of Venus. Science, 159(3820), 1228–1230.

=== Voskhod ===
The Voskhod programme (Russian: Восход, lit. 'ascent, dawn', IPA: [vɐsˈxot]) was the second Soviet human spaceflight project. Both a follow-on to the Vostok programme and a way of recycling components left over after that programme's cancellation following its first six flights, it flew two one-day crewed missions on the Voskhod spacecraft and rocket in 1964 and 1965, plus a 22-day flight carrying two dogs in 1966. It was superseded by the Soyuz programme.

- Burgess, C., & Hall, R. (2009). The first Soviet cosmonaut team: Their lives and legacies. Springer. doi:10.1007/978-0-387-84824-2
- Campbell, M. R., & Charles, J. (2018). Boris Yeregov, first physician in space, and the Voskhod 1 spaceflight. Aerospace Medicine and Human Performance, 89(10), 936–937. doi:10.3357/amhp.5198.2018
- Hall, R. D., & Shayler, D. J. (2001). The rocket men: Vostok & Voskhod, the first Soviet manned spaceflights. Springer-Praxis.
- Shayler, D. J. (2004). Walking in space: Development of space walking techniques. Springer-Praxis.
- Siddiqi, A. A. (2000). Challenge to Apollo: The Soviet Union and the space race, 1945–1974 (NASA SP-2000-4408). National Aeronautics and Space Administration.

=== Vostok ===
The Vostok programme (/ˈvɒstɒkˌvɒˈstɒk/ VOST-ok-,-vost-OK; Russian: Восток, IPA: [vɐˈstok] , lit. 'East') was a Soviet human spaceflight project to put the first Soviet cosmonauts into low Earth orbit and return them safely. Competing with the United States' Project Mercury, it placed the first human in space, Yuri Gagarin, in a single orbit aboard Vostok 1 on April 12, 1961. The Vostok capsule was developed from the Zenit spy satellite project and its launch vehicle adapted from the existing R-7 Semyorka intercontinental ballistic missile (ICBM); the name "Vostok" stayed classified until Gagarin's flight was disclosed to the world press.

The programme flew six crewed missions between 1961 and 1963, the longest lasting nearly five days and the last four launched in pairs a day apart—exceeding Project Mercury's demonstrated limits of just over 34 hours and single-mission flights. Vostok was succeeded by two Voskhod programme flights in 1964 and 1965, which used three- and two-man modifications of the Vostok capsule and a larger launch rocket.

- Burgess, C., & Hall, R. (2009). The first Soviet cosmonaut team: Their lives and legacies. Springer. doi:10.1007/978-0-387-84824-2
- Campbell, M. R., & Charles, J. (2018). Boris Yeregov, first physician in space, and the Voskhod 1 spaceflight. Aerospace Medicine and Human Performance, 89(10), 936–937. doi:10.3357/amhp.5198.2018
- Hall, R. D., & Shayler, D. J. (2001). The rocket men: Vostok & Voskhod, the first Soviet manned spaceflights. Springer-Praxis.
- Shayler, D. J. (2004). Walking in space: Development of space walking techniques. Springer-Praxis.
- Siddiqi, A. A. (2000). Challenge to Apollo: The Soviet Union and the space race, 1945–1974 (NASA SP-2000-4408). National Aeronautics and Space Administration.

=== Zond ===
Zond (Russian: Зонд, lit. 'probe') was the name given to two distinct series of Soviet robotic spacecraft launched between 1964 and 1970. The first series, based on the 3MV planetary probe, was intended to gather information about nearby planets. Two tortoises and other lifeforms aboard Zond 5 were the first terrestrial organisms to travel around the Moon and return to Earth.

- Chertok, B. E. (2011). Rockets and people: Vol. IV. The Moon race (A. A. Siddiqi, Ed.; NASA SP-2011-4110). National Aeronautics and Space Administration.
- Clark, P. S. (1991). The Soviet manned lunar programme and its legacy. Space Policy, 7(3), 221–232.
- Harvey, B. (2007). Around the Moon. In Soviet and Russian lunar exploration (pp. 183–237). Springer.
- Harvey, B. (2007). The first cosmonauts to the Moon. In Soviet and Russian lunar exploration (pp. 111–182). Springer.
- Harvey, B. (2007). Soviet and Russian lunar exploration. Springer.
- Huntress, W. T., Jr., & Marov, M. Ya. (2011). Soviet robots in the solar system: Mission technologies and discoveries. Springer.
- Johnson, N. L. (1979). Handbook of Soviet lunar and planetary exploration (Science and Technology Series, Vol. 47). Univelt.
- LePage, A. J. (1993). The mystery of Zond 2. Journal of the British Interplanetary Society, 46, 401–404.
- Siddiqi, A. A. (2000). Challenge to Apollo: The Soviet Union and the space race, 1945–1974 (NASA SP-2000-4408). National Aeronautics and Space Administration.

== Joint missions and programs ==
=== Apollo–Soyuz Test Project ===
- Ellis, T. (2019). "Howdy partner!" Space brotherhood, détente and the symbolism of the 1975 Apollo–Soyuz Test Project. Journal of American Studies, 53(3), 744–769.
- Volf, D. (2025). The thorny road to a handshake: The Apollo-Soyuz Test Project as a challenge to the US and Soviet space programs. Kritika: Explorations in Russian and Eurasian History, 26(1), 63–90.

=== Shuttle–Mir ===
The Shuttle–Mir program (Russian: Программа «Мир»–«Шаттл») was a collaborative Russian–American space program in which American Space Shuttles visited the Russian space station Mir, Russian cosmonauts flew on the Shuttle, and an American astronaut flew aboard a Soyuz spacecraft, enabling long-duration American expeditions aboard Mir.

- Brannigan, M. (2017). America's first cosmonauts: Reflections on the human cost of Shuttle-Mir. Astropolitics, 15(1), 27–50. doi:10.1080/14777622.2017.1288514
- Evans, B. (2014). Partnership in space: The mid to late nineties. Springer. doi:10.1007/978-1-4614-3278-4
- Harland, D. M. (2005). The story of space station Mir. Springer. doi:10.1007/978-0-387-73977-9
- Kanas, N., Salnitskiy, V., Grund, E. M., Gushin, V., Weiss, D. S., Kozerenko, O., Sled, A., & Marmar, C. (2000). Social and cultural issues during Shuttle/Mir space missions. Acta Astronautica, 47(2–9), 647–655. doi:10.1016/S0094-5765(00)00102-8
- Kanas, N., Salnitskiy, V., Weiss, D. S., Grund, E. M., Gushin, V., Kozerenko, O., Sled, A., Bostrom, A., & Marmar, C. R. (2001). Crewmember and ground personnel interactions over time during Shuttle/Mir space missions. Aviation, Space, and Environmental Medicine, 72(5), 453–461. PMID 11346012
- Kanas, N. A., Salnitskiy, V. P., Ritsher, J. B., Gushin, V. I., Weiss, D. S., Saylor, S. A., Kozerenko, O. P., & Marmar, C. R. (2006). Human interactions in space: ISS vs. Shuttle/Mir. Acta Astronautica, 59(1–5), 413–419. doi:10.1016/j.actaastro.2006.02.007
- Logsdon, J. M., & Millar, J. R. (2001). US–Russian cooperation in human spaceflight: Assessing the impacts. Space Policy, 17(3), 171–178. doi:10.1016/S0265-9646(01)00021-2
- Morgan, C. (2001). Shuttle-Mir: The United States and Russia share history's highest stage (NASA SP-2001-4225). National Aeronautics and Space Administration.
- Portree, D. S. F. (1995). Mir hardware heritage (NASA Reference Publication 1357). National Aeronautics and Space Administration.

=== International Space Station ===
Russia has been an ISS partner since the start of the program, launching the station's first module, Zarya, in 1998 and the Zvezda service module in 2000, which provides propulsion and attitude control for the station. Russia expanded its segment with the Pirs, Poisk, Rassvet, and Nauka modules. The Soyuz spacecraft at times has been the only means of crew transportation and Progress cargo freighters have sustained station operations since 2000.

- Ben-Itzhak, S. (2025). Network analysis of international cooperation in space 1958–2023: Evidence of space blocs. Journal of Peace Research, 62(3), 517–534. doi:10.1177/00223433231225162
- Catchpole, J. E. (2008). The International Space Station: Building for the future. Springer Praxis. doi:10.1007/978-0-387-78145-7
- Chladek, J. (2017). Outposts on the frontier: A fifty-year history of space stations. University of Nebraska Press. JSTOR j.ctt1qv5pdp
- Eriksson, J., & Privalov, R. (2021). Russian space policy and identity: Visionary or reactionary? Journal of International Relations and Development, 24(2), 381–407. doi:10.1057/s41268-020-00195-8
- Evans, B. (2014). Partnership in space: The mid to late nineties. Springer Praxis. doi:10.1007/978-1-4614-3278-4
- Harland, D. M., & Catchpole, J. E. (2002). Creating the International Space Station. Springer Praxis.
- Harvey, B. (2007). The rebirth of the Russian space program: 50 years after Sputnik, new frontiers. Springer Praxis. doi:10.1007/978-0-387-71356-4
- Harvey, B. (2021). European–Russian space cooperation: From de Gaulle to ExoMars. Springer Praxis. doi:10.1007/978-3-030-67686-5
- Karash, Y. Y. (1999). The superpower odyssey: A Russian perspective on space cooperation. American Institute of Aeronautics and Astronautics. doi:10.2514/4.473197
- Krige, J., Callahan, A. L., & Maharaj, A. (2013). NASA in the world: Fifty years of international collaboration in space. Palgrave Macmillan. doi:10.1057/9781137340931
- Logsdon, J. M., & Millar, J. R. (2001). US–Russian cooperation in human spaceflight: Assessing the impacts. Space Policy, 17(3), 171–178. doi:10.1016/S0265-9646(01)00021-2
- Makarov, Y., & Payson, D. (2009). Russian space programmes and industry: Defining the new institutions for new conditions. Space Policy, 25(2), 90–98. doi:10.1016/j.spacepol.2009.02.010
- Oberg, J. E. (2002). Star-crossed orbits: Inside the U.S.–Russian space alliance. McGraw-Hill.
- Solov'ev, V. A., Markov, A. V., Sorokin, I. V., & Lyubinskii, V. E. (2017). Applied scientific research on the International Space Station and new flight-control technologies. Herald of the Russian Academy of Sciences, 87(3), 229–236. doi:10.1134/S1019331617030091
- Sorokin, I. V., Konoshenko, V. P., & Markov, A. V. (2022). Research potential of the ISS Nauka module. Acta Astronautica, 198, 777–784. doi:10.1016/j.actaastro.2022.01.044
- Utkin, V. F., Lukjashchenko, V. I., Borisov, V. V., Suvorov, V. V., & Tsymbalyuk, M. M. (2003). Main results and experience obtained on Mir space station and experiment program for Russian segment of ISS. Acta Astronautica, 53(1), 45–51. doi:10.1016/S0094-5765(02)00136-4
- Vidal, F., & Privalov, R. (2024). Russia in outer space: A shrinking space power in the era of global change. Space Policy, 69, Article 101579. doi:10.1016/j.spacepol.2023.101579
- Zaborskiy, V. (2006). Space engagement with Russia and Ukraine: Preventing conflicts and proliferation. Astropolitics, 4(2), 179–206. doi:10.1080/14777620600919150
- Zimmerman, R. (2003). Leaving Earth: Space stations, rival superpowers, and the quest for interplanetary travel. Joseph Henry Press.

== Launch vehicles ==
=== Angara ===
- Harvey, B. (2001). Russia in space: The failed frontier? Springer Praxis.
- Harvey, B. (2007). The rebirth of the Russian space program: 50 years after Sputnik, new frontiers. Springer Praxis. doi:10.1007/978-0-387-71356-4

=== Energia and Buran ===
- Hendrickx, B. (2002). The origins and evolution to the Energiya rocket family. Journal of the British Interplanetary Society, 55, 242–278.
- Hendrickx, B., & Vis, B. (2007). Energiya-Buran: The Soviet space shuttle. Springer Praxis. doi:10.1007/978-0-387-73984-7

=== Proton ===
- Bzhilianskaya, L. (1997). Russian launch vehicles on the world market: A case-study of international joint ventures. Space Policy, 13(4), 323–338. doi:10.1016/S0265-9646(97)00027-1
- Lardier, C., & Barensky, S. (2018). The Proton launcher: History and developments. ISTE Ltd; John Wiley & Sons. doi:10.1002/9781119510536
- Siddiqi, A. A. (2000). Challenge to Apollo: The Soviet Union and the space race, 1945–1974 (NASA SP-2000-4408). National Aeronautics and Space Administration.

=== Soyuz ===
- Gerovitch, S. (2008). Stalin's rocket designers' leap into space: The technical intelligentsia faces the thaw. Osiris, 23(1), 189–209. doi:10.1086/591874 JSTOR 10.1086/591874
- Lardier, C., & Barensky, S. (2013). The Soyuz launch vehicle: The two lives of an engineering triumph. Springer. doi:10.1007/978-1-4614-5459-5
- Siddiqi, A. A. (2003). The rockets' red glare: Technology, conflict, and terror in the Soviet Union. Technology and Culture, 44(3), 470–501. doi:10.1353/tech.2003.0133 JSTOR 25148158
- Siddiqi, A. A. (2004). Russians in Germany: Founding the post-war missile programme. Europe-Asia Studies, 56(8), 1131–1156. doi:10.1080/1465342042000308893 JSTOR 4147400
- Siddiqi, A. A. (2008). Sputnik 50 years later: New evidence on its origins. Acta Astronautica, 63(1–4), 529–539. doi:10.1016/j.actaastro.2007.12.042
- Siddiqi, A. A. (2010). The red rockets' glare: Spaceflight and the Russian imagination, 1857–1957. Cambridge University Press.

== Space based telescopes ==
=== Astron ===
Astron was a Soviet space telescope launched on 23 March 1983 using the Proton-K rocket. Based on the 4MV spacecraft design and operational for six years, Astron was the largest ultraviolet space telescope of its time.

- Boyarchuk, A. A. (1987). The ultraviolet telescope on the Astron satellite. Astrophysics and Space Physics Reviews, 5, 225.
- Boyarchuk, A. A., Gershberg, R. E., Zvereva, A. M., Petrov, P. P., & Severny, A. B. (1987). Observations of Supernova 1987A in the Large Magellanic Cloud from the Astron station. Soviet Astronomy Letters, 13, 311.
- Boyarchuk, A., Savanov, I., Kanev, E., Shustov, B., & Sachkov, M. (2014). The Soviet ASTRON mission: Legacy. Astrophysics and Space Science, 354(1), 247–250. doi:10.1007/s10509-014-2025-5
- Harvey, B., & Zakutnyaya, O. (2011). Russian space probes: Scientific discoveries and future missions. Springer. ISBN 978-1-4419-8149-3. (The Astron mission is treated at pp. 376–380.)
- Kilpio, E. Yu., Mironov, A. V., & Malkov, O. Yu. (2016). On the Astron UV space mission data. Baltic Astronomy, 25(1), 23–30. doi:10.1515/astro-2017-0105

=== Gamma ===
The Gamma-1 telescope was the main instrument of the Soviet Gamma mission, designed to observe high-energy radiation from space. An onboard star tracker helped it point precisely at its targets, though an equipment failure early in the mission left it performing well below its intended capability. The telescope was first conceived in 1965 as part of a planned Soviet space station, and serious work began in 1972 with the goal of making it the first module of a modular station. When that station project was canceled in 1974 — the same year the effort became a joint venture with France — and the Soviet space program was later reorganized, the observatory was redesigned as a free-flying satellite. Production was approved in 1979 with a launch planned for 1984, but it did not actually fly until 1990.

- Akimov, V. V., Afanassyev, V. G., Blokhintsev, I. D., Kalinkin, L. F., Leikov, N. G., Nesterov, V. E., Galper, A. M., Ozerov, Yu. V., Rud'ko, V. A., Runtso, M. F., Zemskov, V. M., Fradkin, M. I., Kurnosova, L. V., Rusakovich, M. A., Topchiev, N. P., Chuikin, E. I., Tugaenko, V. Yu., Gros, M., Bazer-Bachi, A. R., . . . Olive, J.-F. (1993). Geminga pulsar observations with gamma-telescope Gamma-1. Advances in Space Research, 13(12), 739–742. doi:10.1016/0273-1177(93)90190-M
- Akimov, V. V., Afanassyev, V. G., Blokhintsev, I. D., Leikov, N. G., Nesterov, V. E., Galper, A. M., Ozerov, Yu. V., Rud'ko, V. A., Zemskov, V. M., Fradkin, M. I., Topchiev, N. P., Chuikin, E. I., Barouch, E., Grenier, I., Gros, M., Bazer-Bachi, A. R., Lavigne, J.-M., Olive, J.-F., Buczkowska, A., . . . McCulloch, P. (1993). Time variations of high energy gamma emission of Vela pulsar observed by Gamma-1 telescope. Advances in Space Research, 13(12), 657–664. doi:10.1016/0273-1177(93)90177-D
- Akimov, V. V., Balebanov, V. M., Belousov, A. S., Blokhintsev, I. D., Veselova, G. V., Dobrijan, M. B., Kalinkin, L. F., Kovalenko, S. V., Kozlov, V. D., Leikov, N. G., Mordvov, N. K., Nagornih, Yu. I., Nesterov, V. E., Prilutsky, O. F., Prohin, V. L., Rodin, V. G., Tabaldiev, S. R., Chuprov, V. N., Fuks, V. I., . . . Fournier, D. (1989). The gamma-ray telescope Gamma-1. Space Science Reviews, 49(1), 111–124. doi:10.1007/BF00173747
- Akimov, V. V., Balebanov, V. M., Belousov, A. S., Blokhintsev, I. D., Volzhenskaya, V. A., Gerasimov, I. A., Dobrijan, M. B., Kalinkin, L. F., Kozlov, V. D., Kotova, V. B., Leikov, N. G., Mordvov, N. K., Nagornih, Yu. I., Nesterov, V. E., Poluektov, V. P., Prilutsky, O. F., Prokhin, V. L., Repin, S. V., Rodin, V. G., . . . Lavigne, Y. M. (1989). Determination of the characteristics of the gamma-ray telescope Gamma-1. Space Science Reviews, 49(1), 125–138. doi:10.1007/BF00173748
- Akimov, V. V., Blokhintsev, I. D., & Leikov, N. G. (1989). Characteristics of the telescope Gamma-1 in the coded aperture mode. Space Science Reviews, 49(1), 139–149. doi:10.1007/BF00173749
- Grigoriev, V. A. (1989). "Good" events selection efficiency of the scintillation time-of-flight system of the Gamma-1 telescope in the 30–300 MeV energy range. Space Science Reviews, 49(1), 151–155. doi:10.1007/BF00173750
- Leikov, N. G., Akimov, V. V., Volzhenskaya, V. A., Kalinkin, L. F., Nesterov, V. E., Galper, A. M., Zemskov, V. M., Ozerov, Yu. V., Topchiev, N. P., Fradkin, M. I., Chuikin, E. I., Tugaenko, V. Yu., Gros, M., Grenier, I., Bazer-Bachi, A. R., Lavigne, J.-M., & Olive, J.-F. (1993). Energy spectra of solar flare gamma-ray emission in the range 0.03–2 GeV registered by Gamma-1 telescope. Advances in Space Research, 13(9), 249–253. doi:10.1016/0273-1177(93)90486-U
- Thompson, D. J., & Moiseev, A. A. (2024). Pair production detectors for gamma-ray astrophysics. In C. Bambi & A. Santangelo (Eds.), Handbook of X-ray and gamma-ray astrophysics. Springer. doi:10.1007/978-981-19-6960-7_159

=== Granat ===
Granat was a Soviet (later Russian) space observatory developed with France, Denmark, and Bulgaria, launched in December 1989 on a Proton rocket into an orbit that allowed most of its time to be spent observing. It operated for nearly nine years, spending its first five conducting targeted observations of the universe across a broad range of high-energy radiation. After running out of the gas needed to aim itself in September 1994, it continued working in an automatic survey mode until transmissions ceased in November 1998. The observatory carried seven instruments, including a main telescope for imaging high-energy sources, a dedicated detector for sudden bursts of radiation, and a monitor that continuously watched the sky to alert the other instruments to new or interesting targets.

- Bouchet, L., Roques, J. P., Ballet, J., Goldwurm, A., & Paul, J. (2001). The SIGMA/GRANAT telescope: Calibration and data reduction. The Astrophysical Journal, 548(2), 990–1009. doi:10.1086/318997
- Brandt, S., Lund, N., & Rao, A. R. (1990). The WATCH all-sky monitor for the Granat project. Advances in Space Research, 10(2), 239–242. doi:10.1016/0273-1177(90)90148-S
- Churazov, E., Gilfanov, M., Sunyaev, R., Grebenev, S., Markevich, M., Pavlinsky, M., Dyachkov, A., Khavenson, N., Cordier, B., Goldwurm, A., Lebrun, F., Paul, J., Roques, J. P., Mandrou, P., Bouchet, L., & Mallet, I. (1994). Review of Galactic Center observations with Granat. In W. Wamsteker, M. S. Longair, & Y. Kondo (Eds.), Frontiers of space and ground-based astronomy: The astrophysics of the 21st century (Astrophysics and Space Science Library Vol. 187, pp. 35–46). Kluwer Academic Publishers. doi:10.1007/978-94-011-0794-5_4
- Paul, J. (1995). Overview of the SIGMA results. In M. Signore, P. Salati, & G. Vedrenne (Eds.), The gamma-ray sky with Compton GRO and SIGMA (NATO ASI Series C Vol. 461, pp. 15–26). Kluwer Academic Publishers. doi:10.1007/978-94-011-0067-0_2
- Paul, J., Mandrou, P., Ballet, J., Cantin, M., Chabaud, J. P., Cordier, B., Ehanno, M., Goldwurm, A., Lambert, A., Landé, J., Laurent, P., Lebrun, F., Leray, J. P., Ména, B., Niel, M., Roques, J. P., Rouaix, G., Salotti, L., Souleille, P., & Vedrenne, G. (1991). SIGMA: The hard X-ray and soft gamma-ray telescope on board the GRANAT space observatory. Advances in Space Research, 11(8), 289–302. doi:10.1016/0273-1177(91)90181-I
- Pelaez, F., Mandrou, P., Niel, M., Mena, B., Vilmer, N., Trottet, G., Lebrun, F., Paul, J., Terekhov, O., Sunyaev, R., Churazov, E., Gilfanov, M., Denisov, D., Kuznetsov, A., Dyachkov, A., & Khavenson, N. (1992). Solar hard X-ray and γ-ray bursts observed by the SIGMA anti-coincidence shield aboard GRANAT. Solar Physics, 140(1), 121–138. doi:10.1007/BF00148433
- Revnivtsev, M. G., Sunyaev, R. A., Gilfanov, M. R., Churazov, E. M., Goldwurm, A., Paul, J., Mandrou, P., & Roques, J. P. (2004). A hard X-ray sky survey with the SIGMA telescope of the GRANAT observatory. Astronomy Letters, 30(8), 527–533. doi:10.1134/1.1784494
- Roques, J. P., Paul, J., Mandrou, P., & Lebrun, F. (1990). The SIGMA mission on the GRANAT satellite. Advances in Space Research, 10(2), 223–232. doi:10.1016/0273-1177(90)90146-Q
- Sazonov, S. Y., Sunyaev, R. A., Terekhov, O. V., Lund, N., Brandt, S., & Castro-Tirado, A. J. (1998). GRANAT/WATCH catalogue of cosmic gamma-ray bursts: December 1989 to September 1994. Astronomy and Astrophysics Supplement Series, 129(1), 1–8. doi:10.1051/aas:1998169
- Terekhov, O., Denissenko, D., Sunyaev, R., Sazonov, S., Barat, C., Dezalay, J.-P., Vedrenne, G., Lund, N., Castro-Tirado, A. J., & Brandt, S. (1995). Review of GRANAT observations of gamma-ray bursts. Astrophysics and Space Science, 231(1), 31–34. doi:10.1007/BF00658583
- Tkachenko, A. Yu., Terekhov, O. V., Sunyaev, R. A., Kuznetsov, A. V., Barat, C., Dezalay, J.-P., & Vedrenne, G. (2002). A catalog of cosmic gamma-ray bursts detected by the PHEBUS instrument on the Granat observatory: October 1994–December 1996. Astronomy Letters, 28(6), 353–365. doi:10.1134/1.1484135

=== Orion ===
The Orion space telescopes were a series of two instruments flown aboard Soviet spacecraft during the 1970s to conduct ultraviolet spectroscopy of stars.

==== Orion 1 ====
- Gurzadyan, G. A., & Oganesyan, Dzh. B. (1973). Distribution of energy in the continuous spectrum of Vega and Agena in the range 2000–3800 Å. Astrophysics, 9(2), 111–117. doi:10.1007/BF01011417
- Gurzadyan, G. A., & Ohanesyan, J. B. (1972). Observed energy distribution of α Lyra and β Cen at 2000–3800 Å. Nature, 239(5367), 90. doi:10.1038/239090a0
- Gurzadyan, G. A., & Ohanesyan, J. B. (1972). Spectrograms of α Lyra and β Cen in the region of 2000–3800 Å. Space Science Reviews, 13(4–6), 647–650. doi:10.1007/BF00213498
- Gurzadyan, G. A., & Ohanesyan, J. B. (1972). Ultraviolet absorption lines in the spectrum of Vega. Astronomy and Astrophysics, 20, 321.
- Gurzadyan, G. A., & Ohanesyan, J. B. (1972). The use of synchrotron radiation in the energy calibration of astronomical apparatus. Space Science Reviews, 13(4–6), 642–646. doi:10.1007/BF00213497

==== Orion 2 ====
- Abt, H. A. (1978). Spectral types in Gurzadyan's clustering in Auriga. Publications of the Astronomical Society of the Pacific, 90(537), 555. doi:10.1086/130383
- Gurzadyan, G. A. (1974). A group of ultraviolet stars in Auriga. The Observatory, 94, 293.
- Gurzadyan, G. A. (1974). An interesting ultraviolet star discovered by Orion-2. Astrophysics, 10(3), 236–240. doi:10.1007/BF01001556
- Gurzadyan, G. A. (1974). On the possibility of spectral classification of stars by their ultraviolet spectrograms. Astronomy and Astrophysics, 35, 493.
- Gurzadyan, G. A. (1974). Ultraviolet spectra of Capella. Nature, 250(5463), 204–205. doi:10.1038/250204a0
- Gurzadyan, G. A. (1975). Orion-2: First scientific results. Space Science Reviews, 18(1), 95–139. doi:10.1007/BF00350198
- Gurzadyan, G. A. (1975). Ultraviolet chromospheric lines in the spectra of late-type stars. Monthly Notices of the Royal Astronomical Society, 172(3), 617–621. doi:10.1093/mnras/172.3.617
- Gurzadyan, G. A. (1975). Ultraviolet continuous spectra of gamma Cassiopea. Astronomy and Astrophysics, 40, 447–450.
- Gurzadyan, G. A. (1975). Ultraviolet spectrophotometry of the emission star SAO 0400183. Astronomy and Astrophysics, 39, 213.
- Gurzadyan, G. A. (1975). The ultraviolet spectrum of planetary nebula IC 2149. Monthly Notices of the Royal Astronomical Society, 172(1), 249–256. doi:10.1093/mnras/172.1.249
- Gurzadyan, G. A. (1976). Two-photon emission in planetary nebula IC 2149. Publications of the Astronomical Society of the Pacific, 88, 891. doi:10.1086/130041
- Gurzadyan, G. A. (1978). Ultraviolet observations of planetary nebulae. In Y. Terzian (Ed.), Planetary nebulae: Observations and theory (IAU Symposium No. 76, pp. 79–91). D. Reidel. doi:10.1017/S0074180900142627
- Gurzadyan, G. A. (1979). Ultraviolet spectra of planetary nebulae. Vistas in Astronomy, 23(1), 45–67. doi:10.1016/0083-6656(79)90007-2
- Gurzadyan, G. A., Jarakyan, A. L., Krmoyan, M. N., Kashin, A. L., Loretsyan, G. M., & Ohanesyan, J. B. (1976). Space astrophysical observatory "Orion-2". Astrophysics and Space Science, 40(2), 393–446. doi:10.1007/BF00640454
- Gurzadyan, G. A., Kashin, A. L., Krmoyan, M. N., & Oganesyan, Dzh. B. (1974). Ultraviolet spectrograms of stars obtained on Orion-2. Astrophysics, 10(2), 109–112. doi:10.1007/BF01006128
- Gurzadyan, G. A., & Rustambekova, S. S. (1975). Silicon-rich stellar envelope?. Nature, 254(5498), 311–312. doi:10.1038/254311a0

=== Prognoz ===
Prognoz ("Forecast") was a Soviet scientific research satellite programme comprising three SO ("Solar Object") satellites, seven SO-M (modified SO), and two SO-M2, also known as Interball.

- Albernhe, F., Cassignol, M., Cotin, F., Doulade, C., Talon, R., & Vedrenne, G. (1975). The French neutron and gamma ray detector Signe I, launched aboard the Soviet satellite Prognoz II. Nuclear Instruments and Methods, 129(1), 295–301.
- Boer, M., Hurley, K., Niel, M., Vedrenne, G., Kuznetsov, A., Sunyaev, R., Terekhov, O., & Jakubtsev, L. (1986). The Signe II gamma-ray burst experiment aboard the Prognoz 9 satellite. Advances in Space Research, 6(4), 97–102.
- Diyachkov, A. V., Estulin, I. V., Havenson, N. G., Kuznetsov, A. V., Zenchenko, V. M., Barat, C., Chambon, G., Hurley, K., & Niel, M. (1983). Catalogue of gamma-bursts detected by the Soviet–French experiment "Signe 2M". Advances in Space Research, 3(4), 211–219.
- Harvey, B., & Zakutnyaya, O. (2011). Later Soviet space science: The observatories. In Russian space probes: Scientific discoveries and future missions (pp. 375–465). Springer.
- Harvey, B., & Zakutnyaya, O. (2011). Russian space probes: Scientific discoveries and future missions. Springer.
- Klypin, A. A., Strukov, I. A., & Skulachev, D. P. (1992). The Relikt missions: Results and prospects for detection of the microwave background anisotropy. Monthly Notices of the Royal Astronomical Society, 258(1), 71–81.
- Sibeck, D. G. (2022). Eastern approaches: Interball in the International Solar-Terrestrial Program. Perspectives of Earth and Space Scientists, 3(1), e2022CN000194.
- Sibeck, D. G., & Kudela, K. (Eds.). (1999). Interball in the ISTP program: Studies of the solar wind–magnetosphere–ionosphere interaction (NATO Science Series C, Vol. 537). Kluwer Academic.
- Strukov, I. A., Brukhanov, A. A., Skulachev, D. P., & Sazhin, M. V. (1992). The Relikt-1 experiment: New results. Monthly Notices of the Royal Astronomical Society, 258(1), 37P–40P.
- Zastenker, G. N., Nozdrachev, M. N., Němeček, Z., Šafránková, J., Přech, L., Paularena, K. I., Lazarus, A. J., Lepping, R. P., & Mukai, T. (1999). Plasma and magnetic field variations in the magnetosheath: Interball-1 and ISTP spacecraft observations. In D. G. Sibeck & K. Kudela (Eds.), Interball in the ISTP program: Studies of the solar wind–magnetosphere–ionosphere interaction (pp. 277–294). Kluwer Academic.
- Zelenyi, L. M., & Sauvaud, J. A. (1997). Special topic Interball-1: First scientific results. Annales Geophysicae, 15(5), 511–513.
- Zelenyi, L. M., Triska, P., & Petrukovich, A. A. (1997). INTERBALL—Dual probe and dual mission. Advances in Space Research, 20(4–5), 549–557.

=== RELIKT-1 ===
RELIKT-1 (Russian: РЕЛИКТ-1) was a Soviet cosmic microwave background (CMB) anisotropy experiment aboard the Prognoz 9 satellite. The first CMB satellite experiment, preceding the 1989 Cosmic Background Explorer, it operated from launch on 1 July 1983 until February 1984, measuring the CMB dipole and Galactic plane emission and setting upper limits on the quadrupole moment. Follow-ups RELIKT-2 (planned for about 1993) and a proposed RELIKT-3 were abandoned after the dissolution of the Soviet Union.

- Harvey, B., & Zakutnyaya, O. (2011). Russian space probes: Scientific discoveries and future missions. Springer Praxis.
- Klypin, A. A., Sazhin, M. V., Strukov, I. A., & Skulachev, D. P. (1987). Limits on microwave background anisotropies: The Relikt experiment. Soviet Astronomy Letters, 13, 104–107.
- Klypin, A. A., Strukov, I. A., & Skulachev, D. P. (1992). The Relikt missions: Results and prospects for detection of the microwave background anisotropy. Monthly Notices of the Royal Astronomical Society, 258(1), 71–81. doi:10.1093/mnras/258.1.71
- Mather, J. C., & Boslough, J. (1996). The very first light: The true inside story of the scientific journey back to the dawn of the universe. Basic Books.
- Partridge, R. B. (1995). 3K: The cosmic microwave background radiation. Cambridge University Press. doi:10.1017/CBO9780511525070
- Peebles, P. J. E., Page, L. A., Jr., & Partridge, R. B. (Eds.). (2009). Finding the big bang. Cambridge University Press. doi:10.1017/CBO9780511626500
- Skulachev, D. P. (2010). Cosmic microwave background anisotropy data correlation in WMAP and Relikt-1 experiments. Physics-Uspekhi, 53(4), 373–376. doi:10.3367/UFNe.0180.201004c.0389
- Smoot, G., & Davidson, K. (1994). Wrinkles in time. William Morrow.
- Strukov, I. A., Brukhanov, A. A., Skulachev, D. P., & Sazhin, M. V. (1992). Anisotropy of the microwave background radiation. Soviet Astronomy Letters, 18(5), 153–156.
- Strukov, I. A., Brukhanov, A. A., Skulachev, D. P., & Sazhin, M. V. (1992). The Relikt-1 experiment: New results. Monthly Notices of the Royal Astronomical Society, 258(1), 37P–40P. doi:10.1093/mnras/258.1.37P
- Strukov, I. A., Brukhanov, A. A., Skulachev, D. P., & Sazhin, M. V. (1993). Anisotropy of relic radiation in the RELICT-1 experiment and parameters of grand unification. Physics Letters B, 315(1–2), 198–202. doi:10.1016/0370-2693(93)90180-P
- Strukov, I. A., & Skulachev, D. P. (1984). Deep-space measurements of the microwave background anisotropy: First results of the Relikt experiment. Soviet Astronomy Letters, 10, 1–4.
- Strukov, I. A., Skulachev, D. P., Klypin, A. A., & Sazhin, M. V. (1988). The anisotropy of the microwave background: Space experiment Relict. In J. Audouze, M.-C. Pelletan, & A. Szalay (Eds.), Large scale structures of the universe (IAU Symposium No. 130, pp. 27–34). Kluwer. doi:10.1017/S0074180900135806

=== Rocket Astrophysical Observatories ===
- Gurzadyan, G. A., & Vartanian, K. V. (1972). Solar X-ray source unassociated with sunspots. Space Science Reviews, 13(4–6), 731–737. doi:10.1007/BF00213506

== Orbital Space Stations ==
=== Salyut and Almaz ===
The Salyut programme (Russian: Салют, IPA: [sɐˈlʲut], meaning "salute" or "fireworks") was the world's first space station programme, undertaken by the Soviet Union. Over 15 years, from 1971 to 1986, it comprised four crewed scientific research stations and two crewed military reconnaissance stations, with two further launches failing. The programme served a dual purpose: conducting long-term research into living in space along with astronomical, biological, and Earth-resources experiments, while also acting as a civilian cover for the highly secretive military Almaz stations, which flew under the Salyut designation. Salyut 1, the first station, became the world's first crewed space station.

The Almaz (Russian: Алмаз, lit. 'Diamond') program was a highly secret Soviet military space station program begun in the early 1960s. Three crewed military reconnaissance stations were launched between 1973 and 1976—Salyut 2, Salyut 3, and Salyut 5—each designated as a civilian Salyut space station to disguise the program's military nature. Salyut 2 failed shortly after reaching orbit, but Salyut 3 and Salyut 5 both conducted successful crewed testing. Following Salyut 5, the Soviet Ministry of Defense judged in 1978 that the time and resources consumed by station maintenance outweighed the benefits relative to automatic reconnaissance satellites. Still, the twin program had some achievements alongside the Salyut program, and its heritage continues—the International Space Station module Zarya being one example.

- Baker, P. (2007). 1973–1974: Salyut 2 and Salyut 3—Limited success. In The story of manned space stations: An introduction (pp. 45–51). Springer Praxis. doi:10.1007/978-0-387-68488-8_4
- Baker, P. (2007). The story of manned space stations: An introduction. Springer-Praxis. doi:10.1007/978-0-387-68488-8
- Chladek, J. (2017). Outposts on the frontier: A fifty-year history of space stations. University of Nebraska Press.
- Clark, P. (1988). The Soviet manned space programme: An illustrated history of the men, the missions, and the spacecraft. Salamander Books.
- Hall, R. D., & Shayler, D. J. (2003). Soyuz: A universal spacecraft. Springer-Praxis.
- Ivanovich, G. S. (2008). From Almaz to Salyut. In Salyut—The first space station: Triumph and tragedy (pp. 1–30). Springer Praxis. doi:10.1007/978-0-387-73973-1_1
- Ivanovich, G. S. (2008). Salyut — The first space station: Triumph and tragedy. Springer-Praxis. doi:10.1007/978-0-387-73973-1
- Lewis, C. S. (2021). Space spies in the open: Military space stations and heroic cosmonauts in the post-Apollo period, 1971–77. In A. C. T. Geppert, D. Brandau, & T. Siebeneichner (Eds.), Militarizing outer space: Astroculture, dystopia and the Cold War (pp. 313–341). Palgrave Macmillan. doi:10.1057/978-1-349-95851-1_12
- Marek, K.-H., & Schmidt, K. (1994). Preliminary results of the comparative analysis of ERS-1 and ALMAZ-1 SAR data. ISPRS Journal of Photogrammetry and Remote Sensing, 49(3), 12–18. doi:10.1016/0924-2716(94)90033-7
- Newkirk, D. (1990). Almanac of Soviet manned space flight. Gulf Publishing.
- Portree, D. S. F. (1995). Mir hardware heritage (NASA Reference Publication 1357). National Aeronautics and Space Administration.
- Shayler, D. J. (2000). Disasters and accidents in manned spaceflight. Springer-Praxis.
- Siddiqi, A. A. (2000). Challenge to Apollo: The Soviet Union and the space race, 1945–1974 (NASA SP-2000-4408). National Aeronautics and Space Administration.
- Siddiqi, A. A. (2001). The Almaz space station complex: A history, 1964–1992, Part 1: 1964–1976. Journal of the British Interplanetary Society, 54(11/12), 389–416.
- Siddiqi, A. A. (2003). The Almaz space station complex: A history, 1964–1992, Part 2: 1976–1992. Journal of the British Interplanetary Society, 55(1/2), 35–67.
- Tilley, D. G., & Beal, R. C. (1994). ERS-1 and Almaz estimates of directional ocean wave spectra conditioned by simultaneous aircraft SAR and buoy measurements. Atmosphere-Ocean, 32(1), 113–142. doi:10.1080/07055900.1994.9649492
- Zimmerman, R. (2003). Leaving Earth: Space stations, rival superpowers, and the quest for interplanetary travel. Joseph Henry Press. doi:10.17226/10531

=== Mir ===
Mir (Russian: Мир, IPA: [ˈmʲir]; lit. 'peace' or 'world') was a space station in low Earth orbit, operated from 1986 to 2001 by the Soviet Union and then the Russian Federation. The first modular space station, assembled in orbit between 1986 and 1996, it was the largest artificial satellite of its era, surpassed only by the International Space Station (ISS) after the deorbit of Mir in 2001. Its crews conducted microgravity research in biology, human biology, physics, astronomy, meteorology, and spacecraft systems, working toward technologies for the permanent occupation of space.

The first continuously inhabited long-term research station in orbit, Mir held the record for the longest continuous human presence in space (3,644 days) until the ISS surpassed it in 2010, and it still holds the record for the longest single human spaceflight: 437 days by Valeri Polyakov in 1994–1995. Crews typically numbered three, peaking at ten during STS-71. Occupied for twelve and a half of its fifteen years, the station hosted 105 cosmonauts and astronauts from 12 nations, who carried out 80 spacewalks.

Mir followed the Salyut programme's six crewed single-module stations in the Soviet space programme; its inaugural flight, Soyuz T-15, also made the only station-to-station trip, docking with Salyut 7. The station comprised seven pressurised modules and several unpressurised components, beginning with the Core Module launched in 1986; Proton rockets launched every component except the Docking Module, installed by the Space Shuttle on STS-74. Powered by photovoltaic arrays on the modules, Mir was maintained in an orbit between 296 and 421 km (184 and 262 mi), completing 15.7 orbits per day at an inclination of 51.6°.

- Badhwar, G. D., Atwell, W., Reitz, G., Beaujean, R., & Heinrich, W. (2002). Radiation measurements on the Mir Orbital Station. Radiation Measurements, 35(5), 393–422.
- Baker, P. W., & Leff, L. G. (2006). Mir space station bacteria responses to modeled reduced gravity under starvation conditions. Advances in Space Research, 38(6), 1152–1158.
- Benton, E. R., Benton, E. V., & Frank, A. L. (2002). Passive dosimetry aboard the Mir Orbital Station: External measurements. Radiation Measurements, 35(5), 457–471.
- Benton, E. R., Benton, E. V., & Frank, A. L. (2002). Passive dosimetry aboard the Mir Orbital Station: Internal measurements. Radiation Measurements, 35(5), 439–455.
- Brannigan, M. (2017). America's first cosmonauts: Reflections on the human cost of Shuttle-Mir. Astropolitics, 15(1), 27–50.
- Burrough, B. (1998). Dragonfly: NASA and the crisis aboard Mir. HarperCollins.
- Harland, D. M. (2005). The story of space station Mir. Springer. doi:10.1007/978-0-387-73977-9
- Harvey, B. (2007). The rebirth of the Russian space program: 50 years after Sputnik, new frontiers. Springer. doi:10.1007/978-0-387-71356-4
- Kanas, N., Salnitskiy, V., Grund, E. M., Gushin, V., Weiss, D. S., Kozerenko, O., Sled, A., & Marmar, C. R. (2000). Social and cultural issues during Shuttle/Mir space missions. Acta Astronautica, 47(2–9), 647–655.
- Kanas, N., Salnitskiy, V., Grund, E. M., Weiss, D. S., Gushin, V., Kozerenko, O., Sled, A., & Marmar, C. R. (2001). Human interactions during Shuttle/Mir space missions. Acta Astronautica, 48(5–12), 777–784.
- Kanas, N., Salnitskiy, V., Grund, E. M., Weiss, D. S., Gushin, V., Kozerenko, O., Sled, A., & Marmar, C. R. (2001). Human interactions in space: Results from Shuttle/Mir. Acta Astronautica, 49(3–10), 243–260.
- Kanas, N. A., Salnitskiy, V. P., Ritsher, J. B., Gushin, V. I., Weiss, D. S., Saylor, S. A., Kozerenko, O. P., & Marmar, C. R. (2006). Human interactions in space: ISS vs. Shuttle/Mir. Acta Astronautica, 59(1–5), 413–419.
- Kitmacher, G. H. (2006). Reference guide to the International Space Station. Apogee Books.
- Linenger, J. M. (2000). Off the planet: Surviving five perilous months aboard the space station Mir. McGraw-Hill.
- Mandeville, J. C. (1991). Study of cosmic dust particles on board LDEF and Mir space station. In A. C. Levasseur-Regourd & H. Hasegawa (Eds.), Origin and evolution of interplanetary dust (pp. 11–14). Kluwer Academic.
- Morgan, C. (2001). Shuttle-Mir: The United States and Russia share history's highest stage (NASA SP-2001-4225). National Aeronautics and Space Administration.
- Oberg, J. E. (2002). Star-crossed orbits: Inside the U.S.–Russian space alliance. McGraw-Hill.
- Ott, C. M., Bruce, R. J., & Pierson, D. L. (2004). Microbial characterization of free floating condensate aboard the Mir space station. Microbial Ecology, 47(2), 133–136.
- Portree, D. S. F. (1995). Mir hardware heritage (NASA Reference Publication 1357). National Aeronautics and Space Administration.
- Ritsher, J. B., Kanas, N. A., Ihle, E. C., & Saylor, S. A. (2007). Psychological adaptation and salutogenesis in space: Lessons from a series of studies. Acta Astronautica, 60(4–7), 336–340.
- Stein, T. P., Leskiw, M. J., Schluter, M. D., Donaldson, M. R., & Larina, I. (1999). Protein kinetics during and after long-duration spaceflight on Mir. American Journal of Physiology-Endocrinology and Metabolism, 276(6), E1014–E1021.
- Suedfeld, P., Wilk, K. E., & Cassel, L. (2013). Flying with strangers: Postmission reflections of multinational space crews. In D. A. Vakoch (Ed.), On orbit and beyond: Psychological perspectives on human spaceflight (pp. 185–209). Springer.

== Soviet crewed lunar programs ==
- Under construction

== Soviet Deep Space Network ==
The Soviet Deep Space Network (or Russian Deep Space Network) is a network of large antennas and communication facilities that supports interplanetary spacecraft missions and radio and radar astronomy observations of the Solar System and the universe. Built for the space missions of the Soviet Union, it is now maintained by Russia. Similar networks are run by the United States, China, Europe, Japan, and India.

- Altunin, V. I. (1993). Prospects for using Soviet DSN antennas for SETI. In G. S. Shostak (Ed.), Third decennial US–USSR conference on SETI (Astronomical Society of the Pacific Conference Series, Vol. 47, p. 37). Astronomical Society of the Pacific.
- Ball, A. J., Garry, J. R. C., Lorenz, R. D., & Kerzhanovich, V. V. (2007). Planetary landers and entry probes. Cambridge University Press.
- Butrica, A. J. (1996). To see the unseen: A history of planetary radar astronomy (NASA SP-4218). National Aeronautics and Space Administration.
- Charbonneau, R. (2024). Mixed signals: Alien communication across the Iron Curtain. Polity Press.
- Harvey, B. (2007). Russian planetary exploration: History, development, legacy and prospects. Springer.
- Harvey, B. (2007). Soviet and Russian lunar exploration. Springer.
- Harvey, B., & Zakutnyaya, O. (2011). Russian space probes: Scientific discoveries and future missions. Springer.
- Huntress, W. T., Jr., & Marov, M. Ya. (2011). Soviet robots in the solar system: Mission technologies and discoveries. Springer.
- Keldysh, M. V. (1977). Venus exploration with the Venera 9 and Venera 10 spacecraft. Icarus, 30(4), 605–625.
- Marov, M. Ya. (1978). Results of Venus missions. Annual Review of Astronomy and Astrophysics, 16, 141–169.
- Perminov, V. G. (1999). The difficult road to Mars: A brief history of Mars exploration in the Soviet Union (Monographs in Aerospace History No. 15). National Aeronautics and Space Administration.
- Preston, R. A., Hildebrand, C. E., Purcell, G. H., Jr., Ellis, J., Stelzried, C. T., Finley, S. G., Sagdeev, R. Z., Linkin, V. M., Kerzhanovich, V. V., Altunin, V. I., Kogan, L. R., Kostenko, V. I., Matveenko, L. I., Pogrebenko, S. V., Strukov, I. A., Akim, E. L., Alexandrov, Yu. N., Armand, N. A., Bakitko, R. N., . . . Petit, G. (1986). Determination of Venus winds by ground-based radio tracking of the VEGA balloons. Science, 231(4744), 1414–1416.
- Sagdeev, R. Z., Linkin, V. M., Kerzhanovich, V. V., Lipatov, A. N., Shurupov, A. A., Blamont, J. E., Crisp, D., Ingersoll, A. P., Elson, L. S., Preston, R. A., Hildebrand, C. E., Ragent, B., Seiff, A., Young, R. E., Petit, G., Boloh, L., Alexandrov, Yu. N., Armand, N. A., Bakitko, R. V., & Selivanov, A. S. (1986). Overview of VEGA Venus balloon in situ meteorological measurements. Science, 231(4744), 1411–1414.
- Sagdeev, R. Z., & Zakharov, A. V. (1989). Brief history of the Phobos mission. Nature, 341(6243), 581–585.
- Siddiqi, A. A. (2000). Challenge to Apollo: The Soviet Union and the space race, 1945–1974 (NASA SP-2000-4408). National Aeronautics and Space Administration.
- Siddiqi, A. A. (2002). Deep space chronicle: A chronology of deep space and planetary probes, 1958–2000 (Monographs in Aerospace History No. 24; NASA SP-2002-4524). National Aeronautics and Space Administration.
- Ulivi, P., & Harland, D. M. (2007). Robotic exploration of the solar system, Part 1: The golden age, 1957–1982. Springer.
- Ulivi, P., & Harland, D. M. (2009). Robotic exploration of the solar system, Part 2: Hiatus and renewal, 1983–1996. Springer.

== Cosmonauts ==
- Andrews, J. T., & Siddiqi, A. A. (Eds.). (2011). Into the cosmos: Space exploration and Soviet culture. University of Pittsburgh Press. JSTOR j.ctt6wrcn2
- Basner, M., Dinges, D. F., Mollicone, D. J., Savelev, I., Ecker, A. J., Di Antonio, A., Jones, C. W., Hyder, E. C., Kan, K., Morukov, B. V., & Sutton, J. P. (2014). Psychological and behavioral changes during confinement in a 520-day simulated interplanetary mission to Mars. PLOS ONE, 9(3), e93298.
- Bugrov, S. A., Voronin, L. I., Voronkov, Yu. I., Korotayev, M. M., & Senkevich, Yu. A. (1992). Selection and biomedical training of cosmonauts. Advances in Space Research, 12(1), 347–350.
- Burgess, C. (2022). Soviets in space: Russia's cosmonauts and the space frontier. Reaktion Books.
- Burgess, C., & Hall, R. (2009). The first Soviet cosmonaut team: Their lives and legacies. Springer/Praxis. doi:10.1007/978-0-387-84824-2
- Gerovitch, S. (2007). "New Soviet man" inside machine: Human engineering, spacecraft design, and the construction of communism. Osiris, 22(1), 135–157.
- Gerovitch, S. (2008). Stalin's rocket designers' leap into space: The technical intelligentsia faces the thaw. Osiris, 23(1), 189–209.
- Gerovitch, S. (2011). The human inside a propaganda machine: The public image and professional identity of Soviet cosmonauts. In J. T. Andrews & A. A. Siddiqi (Eds.), Into the cosmos: Space exploration and Soviet culture (pp. 77–106). University of Pittsburgh Press. JSTOR j.ctt6wrcn2.8
- Gerovitch, S. (2011). "Why are we telling lies?" The creation of Soviet space history myths. The Russian Review, 70(3), 460–484.
- Gerovitch, S. (2014). Voices of the Soviet space program: Cosmonauts, soldiers, and engineers who took the USSR into space. Palgrave Macmillan. doi:10.1057/9781137481795
- Gerovitch, S. (2015). Soviet space mythologies: Public images, private memories, and the making of a cultural identity. University of Pittsburgh Press. JSTOR j.ctt15nmjd1
- Gontcharov, I. B., Kovachevich, I. V., Pool, S. L., Navinkov, O. L., Barratt, M. R., Bogomolov, V. V., & House, N. (2005). In-flight medical incidents in the NASA-Mir program. Aviation, Space, and Environmental Medicine, 76(7), 692–696.
- Grigoriev, A. I., Bugrov, S. A., Bogomolov, V. V., Egorov, A. D., Polyakov, V. V., Tarasov, I. K., & Shulzhenko, E. B. (1993). Main medical results of extended flights on space station Mir in 1986–1990. Acta Astronautica, 29(8), 581–585.
- Grigoriev, A. I., Morukov, B. V., & Vorobiev, D. V. (1994). Water and electrolyte studies during long-term missions onboard the space stations Salyut and Mir. The Clinical Investigator, 72(3), 169–189.
- Harford, J. (1997). Korolev: How one man masterminded the Soviet drive to beat America to the Moon. John Wiley & Sons.
- Jenks, A. (2011). The sincere deceiver: Yuri Gagarin and the search for a higher truth. In J. T. Andrews & A. A. Siddiqi (Eds.), Into the cosmos: Space exploration and Soviet culture (pp. 107–132). University of Pittsburgh Press. JSTOR j.ctt6wrcn2.9
- Jenks, A. (2012). Conquering space: The cult of Yuri Gagarin. In M. Bassin & C. Kelly (Eds.), Soviet and post-Soviet identities (pp. 129–149). Cambridge University Press.
- Jenks, A. L. (2012). The cosmonaut who couldn't stop smiling: The life and legend of Yuri Gagarin. Northern Illinois University Press.
- Kanas, N. (1991). Psychosocial support for cosmonauts. Aviation, Space, and Environmental Medicine, 62(4), 353–355.
- Kanas, N. (2015). Humans in space: The psychological hurdles. Springer. doi:10.1007/978-3-319-18869-0
- Kanas, N., & Manzey, D. (2008). Space psychology and psychiatry (2nd ed.). Springer. doi:10.1007/978-1-4020-6770-9
- Kanas, N., Salnitskiy, V., Grund, E. M., Gushin, V., Weiss, D. S., Kozerenko, O., Sled, A., & Marmar, C. R. (2002). Lessons learned from Shuttle/Mir: Psychosocial countermeasures. Aviation, Space, and Environmental Medicine, 73(6), 607–611.
- Kanas, N., Salnitskiy, V., Grund, E. M., Weiss, D. S., Gushin, V., Kozerenko, O., Sled, A., & Marmar, C. R. (2001). Human interactions during Shuttle/Mir space missions. Acta Astronautica, 48(5–12), 777–784.
- Kohonen, I. (2017). Picturing the cosmos: A visual history of early Soviet space endeavor. Intellect Books.
- Leonov, A., & Scott, D. (2004). Two sides of the Moon: Our story of the Cold War space race. Thomas Dunne Books/St. Martin's Press.
- Lewis, C. S. (2023). Cosmonaut: A cultural history. University Press of Florida.
- Maurer, E., Richers, J., Rüthers, M., & Scheide, C. (Eds.). (2011). Soviet space culture: Cosmic enthusiasm in socialist societies. Palgrave Macmillan. doi:10.1057/9780230307049
- Orlov, O. I., Belakovskiy, M. S., Kussmaul, A. R., & Tomilovskaya, E. S. (2022). Using the possibilities of Russian space medicine for terrestrial healthcare. Frontiers in Physiology, 13, 921487.
- Orlov, O. I., Sychev, V. N., Samarin, G. I., Ilyin, E. A., Belakovskiy, M. S., & Kussmaul, A. R. (2014). Multidisciplinary Russian biomedical research in space. Acta Astronautica, 101, 180–187.
- Siddiqi, A. A. (2000). Challenge to Apollo: The Soviet Union and the space race, 1945–1974. National Aeronautics and Space Administration.
- Siddiqi, A. A. (2010). The red rockets' glare: Spaceflight and the Russian imagination, 1857–1957. Cambridge University Press.
- Smith, S. M., Wastney, M. E., O'Brien, K. O., Morukov, B. V., Larina, I. M., Abrams, S. A., Davis-Street, J. E., Oganov, V., & Shackelford, L. C. (2005). Bone markers, calcium metabolism, and calcium kinetics during extended-duration space flight on the Mir space station. Journal of Bone and Mineral Research, 20(2), 208–218.
- Stein, T. P., Leskiw, M. J., Schluter, M. D., Donaldson, M. R., & Larina, I. (1999). Protein kinetics during and after long-duration spaceflight on Mir. American Journal of Physiology-Endocrinology and Metabolism, 276(6), E1014–E1021.
- Sylvester, R. P. (2011). She orbits over the sex barrier: Soviet girls and the Tereshkova moment. In J. T. Andrews & A. A. Siddiqi (Eds.), Into the cosmos: Space exploration and Soviet culture (pp. 195–212). University of Pittsburgh Press. JSTOR j.ctt6wrcn2.12
- Sylvester, R. P. (2019). "You are our pride and our glory!" Emotions, generation, and the legacy of revolution in women's letters to Valentina Tereshkova. The Russian Review, 78(3), 392–413.

== Academic journals ==
Very few journals are dedicated specifically to the history of science and technology in Russia and the Soviet Union; the specialist journal is listed first, followed by general history of science and technology journals and Russian, Soviet, and Slavic studies journals that regularly publish work in this field.

Specialist journal

- Voprosy istorii estestvoznaniia i tekhniki (VIET; Studies in the History of Science and Technology). Institute for the History of Science and Technology, Russian Academy of Sciences (1980–present). ISSN 0205-9606. [In Russian, with English abstracts.]

History of science, technology, and medicine

- Isis. University of Chicago Press for the History of Science Society.
- Technology and Culture. Johns Hopkins University Press for the Society for the History of Technology.
- History and Technology. Taylor & Francis.
- Annals of Science. Taylor & Francis.
- British Journal for the History of Science. Cambridge University Press for the British Society for the History of Science.
- Historical Studies in the Natural Sciences. University of California Press.
- IEEE Annals of the History of Computing. IEEE Computer Society.

Russian, Soviet, and Slavic studies

- Kritika: Explorations in Russian and Eurasian History. Slavica Publishers.
- Slavic Review. Cambridge University Press for the Association for Slavic, East European, and Eurasian Studies.
- The Russian Review. Wiley.
- Russian History. Brill.
- Europe-Asia Studies. Taylor & Francis.
- Russian Studies in History. Taylor & Francis.

== See also ==
- Bibliography of Russian history
- Bibliography of the Soviet Union
- Space industry of Russia
- Russian Aerospace Defence Forces
