= Bibliography of science and technology in Russia and the Soviet Union =

The Bibliography of science and technology in Russia and the Soviet Union consists of the following sections:

- Bibliography of Russian and Soviet science
- Bibliography of Russian and Soviet science: Physical sciences
- Bibliography of Russian and Soviet science: Life sciences
- Bibliography of Russian and Soviet science: Technology
- Bibliography of Russian and Soviet science: Space programs
- Bibliography of Russian and Soviet science: Military technology
- Bibliography of Russian and Soviet industrialization

== See also ==
- Bibliography of Russian history (1613–1917)
- Bibliography of Stalinism and the Soviet Union
- Bibliography of the post-Stalinist Soviet Union
- Bibliography of Russian history (1991–present)
