= Bibliography of Russian and Soviet science =

Bibliography of general works about Russian and Soviet science and technology

This is a select bibliography of academic level English language books (including translations) and journal articles, published mainly post World War II, (Note: works published during or before World War II should be limited to areas where there is no significant post World War II books on the subject or when the work in question has significant historical merit.) about the general history of science and technology in Russia and the Soviet Union.

For specific areas of science and technology, please see:

Works listed here are cited in the notes or bibliographies of scholarly sources. Each is published by an academic or major press, written by a recognized expert, or substantially reviewed in scholarly journals; borderline cases are omitted. A selection of primary sources are included. Many of the books below carry their own bibliographies; see Further reading for longer ones, and External links for historical sites and museums.

Citations follow APA style. (Note: Entries are in plain text APA 7 format without templates; templates are used only for reviews and notes.) Book have citations to academic journal or mainstream published reviews when available. For books only partly about the subject, give relevant chapter or section titles where useful and available. Translators of the original-language edition are included when possible. In cases where a title or name has appeared with more than one English spelling, use the most recent published form is used and a footnote documents any earlier title under which the work appeared.

== General ==
- Balzer, H. D. (1985). Is less more? Soviet science in the Gorbachev era. Issues in Science and Technology, 1(4), 29–46.
- Balzer, H. D. (1989). Soviet Science on the Edge of Reform. Westview Press.
- Birstein, V. J. (2001). The Perversion of Knowledge: The True Story of Soviet Science. Westview Press.
- Crowther, J. G. (1943). Science in Soviet Russia. Journal of the Royal Society of Arts, 91(4639), 302–309.
- DeWitt, N. (1960). Soviet science: The institutional debate. Bulletin of the Atomic Scientists, 16(6), 208–211.
- Dufaud, G., & Tatarchenko, K. (2022). The lives of late Soviet science (1945–1991): Introduction. Cahiers du Monde russe, 63(1), 21–32.
- Gordin, M. D. (2015). Scientific Babel: How Science Was Done Before and After Global English. University of Chicago Press.
- Gordin, M. D., & Hall, K. (2008). Introduction: Intelligentsia science inside and outside Russia. Osiris, 23(1), 1–19.
- Gordin, M. D., Hall, K., & Kojevnikov, A. (Eds.). (2008). Intelligentsia Science: The Russian Century, 1860–1960. University of Chicago Press.
- Graham, L. R. (1992). Big Science in the Last Years of the Big Soviet Union. Osiris, 7, 49–71.
- Graham, L. R. (1993). Science in Russia and the Soviet Union: A Short History. Cambridge University Press.
- Graham, L. R. (1993). The Ghost of the Executed Engineer: Technology and the Fall of the Soviet Union. Harvard University Press.
- Graham, L. R. (1998). What Have We Learned About Science and Technology from the Russian Experience? Stanford University Press.
- Graham, L. R. (2006). Moscow Stories. Indiana University Press.
- Graham, L. R. (2013). Lonely Ideas: Can Russia Compete? MIT Press.
- Graham, L. R., & Dezhina, I. (2008). Science in the New Russia: Crisis, Aid, Reform. Indiana University Press.
- Guth, S. (2015). One future only. The Soviet Union in the age of the scientific-technical revolution. Journal of Modern European History, 13(3), 355–376.
- Ings, S. (2017). Stalin and the Scientists: A History of Triumph and Tragedy, 1905–1953. Atlantic Monthly Press.
- Josephson, P. R. (1995). "Projects of the century" in Soviet history: Large-scale technologies from Lenin to Gorbachev. Technology and Culture, 36(3), 519–559.
- Josephson, P. R. (2002). Industrialized Nature: Brute Force Technology and the Transformation of the Natural World. Island Press.
- Koblitz, A. H. (1988). Science, women, and the Russian intelligentsia: The generation of the 1860s. Isis, 79(2), 208–226.
- Kojevnikov, A. (2008). The phenomenon of Soviet science. Osiris, 23(1), 115–135.
- Krementsov, N. (1997). Stalinist Science. Princeton University Press.
- Lubrano, L. L. (1993). The hidden structure of Soviet science. Science, Technology, & Human Values, 18(2), 147–175.
- Luke, T. W. (1985). Technology and Soviet foreign trade: On the political economy of an underdeveloped superpower. International Studies Quarterly, 29(3), 327–353.
- Medvedev, S. (1997). A general theory of Russian space: A gay science and a rigorous science. Alternatives: Global, Local, Political, 22(4), 523–553.
- Medvedev, Z. A. (1978). Soviet Science. W. W. Norton.
- Pollock, E. (2006). Stalin and the Soviet Science Wars. Princeton University Press.
- Popovsky, M. (1979). Manipulated Science: The Crisis of Science and Scientists in the Soviet Union Today. Doubleday.
- Roberg, J. L. (1998). Soviet Science under Control: The Struggle for Influence. Macmillan Press.
- Rogacheva, M. A. (2016). Soviet scientists take the initiative: Khrushchev's thaw and the emergence of the scientific centre in Chernogolovka. Europe-Asia Studies, 68(7), 1179–1196.
- Siddiqi, A. (2003). The rockets' red glare: Technology, conflict, and terror in the Soviet Union. Technology and Culture, 44(3), 470–501.
- Smolkin-Rothrock, V. (2014). The ticket to the Soviet soul: Science, religion, and the spiritual crisis of late Soviet atheism. The Russian Review, 73(2), 171–197.
- Turkevich, J. (1956). Soviet science in the post-Stalin era. The Annals of the American Academy of Political and Social Science, 303, 139–151.
- Valkova, O. (2008). The conquest of science: Women and science in Russia, 1860–1940. Osiris, 23(1), 136–165.

== Science and the state ==
- Andrews, J. T. (2003). Science for the Masses: The Bolshevik State, Public Science, and the Popular Imagination in Soviet Russia, 1917–1934. Texas A&M University Press.
- Aronova, E. (2011). The politics and contexts of Soviet science studies (Naukovedenie): Soviet philosophy of science at the crossroads. Studies in East European Thought, 63(3), 175–202.
- Autio-Sarasmo, S. (2018). Transferring Western knowledge to a centrally planned economy: Finland and the scientific-technical cooperation with the Soviet Union. In M. Christian, S. Kott, & O. Matějka (Eds.), Planning in Cold War Europe: Competition, cooperation, circulations (1950s–1970s) (1st ed., pp. 143–164). De Gruyter.
- Brožek, J. (1950). The current five-year plan of Soviet science in historical perspective. The Scientific Monthly, 70(6), 390–395.
- Fortescue, S. (1986). The Communist Party and Soviet Science. Macmillan Press.
- Fortescue, S. (1990). Science Policy in the Soviet Union. Routledge.
- Fortescue, S. (1992). The Russian Academy of Sciences and the Soviet Academy of Sciences: Continuity or disjunction?. Minerva, 30(4), 459–478.
- Graham, L. R. (1967). The Soviet Academy of Sciences and the Communist Party, 1927–1932. Princeton University Press.
- Guth, S., Lüscher, F., & Richers, J. (2018). Nuclear technopolitics in the Soviet Union and beyond—An introduction. Jahrbücher für Geschichte Osteuropas, 66(1), 3–19.
- Josephson, P. R. (1988). Science policy in the Soviet Union, 1917–1927. Minerva, 26(3), 342–369.
- Josephson, P. R. (1992). Soviet scientists and the state: Politics, ideology, and fundamental research from Stalin to Gorbachev. Social Research, 59(3), 589–614.
- Josephson, P. R. (1996). Totalitarian Science and Technology. Humanities Press. (Note: Second edition published in 2006.)
- Kaempffert, W. (1941). Science in the Totalitarian State. Foreign Affairs, 19(2), 433–441.
- Kneen, P. (1984). Soviet Scientists and the State: An Examination of the Social and Political Aspects of Science in the USSR. State University of New York Press.
- Kneen, P. (1989). Soviet science policy under Gorbachev. Soviet Studies, 41(1), 67–87.
- Kojevnikov, A. (1996). President of Stalin's Academy: The mask and responsibility of Sergei Vavilov. Isis, 87(1), 18–50.
- Kozhevnikov, A. (1991). Piotr Kapitza and Stalin's government: A study in moral choice. Historical Studies in the Physical and Biological Sciences, 22(1), 131–164.
- Lubrano Greenberg, L. (1973). Policy-making in the USSR Academy of Sciences. Journal of Contemporary History, 8(4), 67–80.
- Lukishova, S. G., Masalov, A. V., & Zadkov, V. N. (2021). Icons of Russian physics: From the Lebedev Scientific School in Physics to the Lebedev Physical Institute. Contemporary Physics, 62(1), 1–13.
- Miller, R. F. (1985). The Role of the Communist Party in Soviet Research and Development. Soviet Studies, 37(1), 31–59.
- Parrott, B. (1983). Politics and Technology in the Soviet Union. MIT Press.
- Pollock, E. (2006). Stalin and the Soviet Science Wars. Princeton University Press.
- Rabkin, Y. M. (1988). Science between the Superpowers. Priority Press.
- Solso, R. L. (1991). The Institute of Psychology, USSR: A 20-year retrospective. Psychological Science, 2(5), 312–320.
- Vucinich, A. (1984). Empire of Knowledge: The Academy of Sciences of the USSR (1917–1970). University of California Press.

== Science and society ==
- Andrews, J. T. (2003). Science for the Masses: The Bolshevik State, Public Science, and the Popular Imagination in Soviet Russia, 1917–1934. Texas A&M University Press.
- Bailes, K. E. (1978). Technology and Society under Lenin and Stalin: Origins of the Soviet Technical Intelligentsia, 1917–1941. Princeton University Press.
- Bailes, K. E. (1990). Science and Russian Culture in an Age of Revolutions: V. I. Vernadsky and His Scientific School, 1863–1945. Indiana University Press.
- Billington, J. H. (1964). Perspectives: Science in Russian culture. American Scientist, 52(2), 274–280.
- Coopersmith, J. (2006). The dog that did not bark during the night: The "normalcy" of Russian, Soviet, and post-Soviet science and technology studies. Technology and Culture, 47(3), 623–637.
- Graham, L. R. (1984). Science and computers in Soviet society. Proceedings of the Academy of Political Science, 35(3), 124–134.
- Graham, L. R. (1987). Science, Philosophy, and Human Behavior in the Soviet Union. Columbia University Press.
- Graham, L. R. (Ed.). (1990). Science and the Soviet Social Order. Harvard University Press.
- Josephson, P. R. (1997). New Atlantis Revisited: Akademgorodok, the Siberian City of Science. Princeton University Press.
- Lubrano, L. L., & Solomon, S. G. (Eds.). (1980). The Social Context of Soviet Science. Westview Press.
- Rogacheva, M. A. (2017). The Private World of Soviet Scientists from Stalin to Gorbachev. Cambridge University Press.
- Vucinich, A. (1963). Science in Russian Culture: A History to 1860. Stanford University Press.
- Vucinich, A. (1967). Mendeleev's views on science and society. Isis, 58(3), 342–351.
- Vucinich, A. (1970). Science in Russian Culture, 1861–1917. Stanford University Press.

== Philosophy ==
- Bakhurst, D. (1991). Consciousness and Revolution in Soviet Philosophy: From the Bolsheviks to Evald Ilyenkov. Cambridge University Press.
- Bazhanov, V. A. (2015). Epistemological contributions to the study of science in the latter days of the USSR: Rethinking orthodox Marxist principles. Studies in East European Thought, 67(1/2), 111–121.
- Bergman, J. (2009). Meeting the Demands of Reason: The Life and Thought of Andrei Sakharov. Cornell University Press.
- Feuer, L. S. (1949). Dialectical materialism and Soviet science. Philosophy of Science, 16(2), 105–124.
- Field, M. G. (1959). Soviet science and some implications for American science and society. Journal of International Affairs, 13(1), 19–33.
- Gordin, M. D., & Hall, K. (2008). Introduction: Intelligentsia science inside and outside Russia. Osiris, 23(1), 1–19.
- Graham, L. R. (1966). Quantum mechanics and dialectical materialism. Slavic Review, 25(3), 381–410.
- Graham, L. R. (1972). Science and Philosophy in the Soviet Union. Alfred A. Knopf.
- Graham, L. R. (1981). Between Science and Values. Columbia University Press.
- Graham, L. R. (1987). Science, Philosophy, and Human Behavior in the Soviet Union. Columbia University Press.
- Joravsky, D. (1977). The mechanical spirit: The Stalinist marriage of Pavlov to Marx. Theory and Society, 4(4), 457–477.
- Joravsky, D. (1961). Soviet Marxism and Natural Science, 1917–1932. Columbia University Press.
- Josephson, P. R. (2010). Would Trotsky Wear a Bluetooth? Technological Utopianism under Socialism, 1917–1989. Johns Hopkins University Press.
- Roll-Hansen, N. (2015). On the philosophical roots of today's science policy: Any lessons from the "Lysenko affair"?. Studies in East European Thought, 67(1/2), 91–109.
- Sax, K. (1947). Soviet science and political philosophy. The Scientific Monthly, 65(1), 43–47.
- Vucinich, A. (1988). Darwin in Russian Thought. University of California Press.
- Vucinich, A. (1980). Soviet physicists and philosophers in the 1930s: Dynamics of a conflict. Isis, 71(2), 236–250.

== Mathematics ==
- Cooke, R. (1984). The Mathematics of Sonya Kovalevskaya. Springer-Verlag.
- Demidov, S. S., & Lëvshin, B. V. (Eds.). (2016). The Case of Academician Nikolai Nikolaevich Luzin (R. Cooke, Trans.). American Mathematical Society. (Original work published 1999)
- Gerovitch, S. (2019). "We teach them to be free": Specialized math schools and the cultivation of the Soviet technical intelligentsia. Kritika: Explorations in Russian and Eurasian History, 20(4), 717–754.
- Graham, L. R., & Kantor, J.-M. (2009). Naming Infinity: A True Story of Religious Mysticism and Mathematical Creativity. Belknap Press of Harvard University Press.
- Koblitz, A. H. (1993). A Convergence of Lives: Sofia Kovalevskaia, Scientist, Writer, Revolutionary (2nd rev. ed.). Rutgers University Press.
- Rappaport, K. D. (1981). S. Kovalevsky: A mathematical lesson. The American Mathematical Monthly, 88(8), 564–574.
- Zdravkovska, S., & Duren, P. L. (Eds.). (2007). Golden Years of Moscow Mathematics (2nd ed.). American Mathematical Society / London Mathematical Society.

== Biographies of Russian and Soviet Scientists, Engineers, and Inventors ==
- Abramson, A. (1995). Zworykin, Pioneer of Television. University of Illinois Press.
- Alexander, R. (2018). Soviet legal and criminological debates on the decriminalization of homosexuality (1965–75). Slavic Review, 77(1), 30–52.
- Andrews, J. T. (2009). Red Cosmos: K. E. Tsiolkovskii, Grandfather of Soviet Rocketry. Texas A&M University Press.
- Badash, L. (1985). Kapitza, Rutherford, and the Kremlin. Yale University Press.
- Bailes, K. E. (1986). Soviet science in the Stalin period: The case of V. I. Vernadskii and his scientific school, 1928–1945. Slavic Review, 45(1), 20–37.
- Bailes, K. E. (1990). Science and Russian Culture in an Age of Revolutions: V. I. Vernadsky and His Scientific School, 1863–1945. Indiana University Press.
- Barr, W. (1991). Aleksandr Lavrent'yevich Chekanovskiy, pioneer geologist and explorer of north central Siberia, 1873–76. Earth Sciences History, 10(2), 106–129.
- Bergman, J. (2009). Meeting the Demands of Reason: The Life and Thought of Andrei Sakharov. Cornell University Press.
- Berman, H. J., & Hunt, D. H. (1950). Criminal law and psychiatry: The Soviet solution. Stanford Law Review, 2(4), 635–663.
- Bessudnova, Z. A. (2013). Grigory (Gotthelf) Fischer von Waldheim (1771–1853): Author of the first scientific works on Russian geology and palaeontology. Earth Sciences History, 32(1), 102–120.
- Boag, J. W., Rubinin, P. E., & Shoenberg, D. (Eds.). (1990). Kapitza in Cambridge and Moscow: Life and Letters of a Russian Physicist. North-Holland.
- Chatt, J., & Rybinskaya, M. I. (1983). Aleksandr Nikolaevich Nesmeyanov. 9 September 1899–17 January 1980. Biographical Memoirs of Fellows of the Royal Society, 29, 399–480.
- Collie, M., & Diemer, J. (Eds.). (2004). Murchison's wanderings in Russia: His geological exploration of Russia in Europe and the Ural Mountains, 1840 and 1841. British Geological Survey.
- Dufaud, G., & Tatarchenko, K. (2022). The lives of late Soviet science (1945–1991): Introduction. Cahiers du Monde russe, 63(1), 21–32.
- Finne, K. N. (1987). Igor Sikorsky: The Russian Years (C. J. Bobrow & V. Hardesty, Eds.). Smithsonian Institution Press.
- Gordin, M. D. (2004). A Well-Ordered Thing: Dmitrii Mendeleev and the Shadow of the Periodic Table. Basic Books.
- Gorelik, G. E., & Frenkel, V. Ya. (1994). Matvei Petrovich Bronstein and Soviet Theoretical Physics in the Thirties (V. M. Levina, Trans.). Birkhäuser. (Original work published 1990)
- Gorelik, G., & Bouis, A. W. (2005). The World of Andrei Sakharov: A Russian Physicist's Path to Freedom. Oxford University Press.
- Harford, J. (1997). Korolev: How One Man Masterminded the Soviet Drive to Beat America to the Moon. John Wiley & Sons.
- Joravsky, D. (1965). The Vavilov brothers. Slavic Review, 24(3), 381–394.
- Kojevnikov, A. (1996). President of Stalin's Academy: The mask and responsibility of Sergei Vavilov. Isis, 87(1), 18–50.
- Kojevnikov, A. (2004). Stalin's Great Science: The Times and Adventures of Soviet Physicists. Imperial College Press.
- Kozhevnikov, A. (1991). Piotr Kapitza and Stalin's government: A study in moral choice. Historical Studies in the Physical and Biological Sciences, 22(1), 131–164.
- Longair, M. S. (2011). Vitaly Lazarevich Ginzburg: 4 October 1916 – 8 November 2009. Biographical Memoirs of Fellows of the Royal Society, 57, 129–146.
- Oldfield, J. D., & Shaw, D. J. B. (2013). V. I. Vernadskii and the development of biogeochemical understandings of the biosphere, c.1880s–1968. The British Journal for the History of Science, 46(2), 287–310.
- Ovsyannikov, S. A., & Ovsyannikov, A. S. (2007). Sergey S. Korsakov and the beginning of Russian psychiatry. Journal of the History of the Neurosciences, 16(1–2), 58–64.
- Pringle, P. (2008). The Murder of Nikolai Vavilov: The Story of Stalin's Persecution of One of the Great Scientists of the Twentieth Century. Simon & Schuster.
- Rappaport, K. D. (1981). S. Kovalevsky: A mathematical lesson. The American Mathematical Monthly, 88(8), 564–574.
- Rowland, S. M. (2013). The life and geological writings of the 'father of Russian science': Mikhail Lomonosov. Earth Sciences History, 32(1), 86–101.
- Sakharov, A. (1990). Memoirs (R. Lourie, Trans.). Alfred A. Knopf.
- Semashko, N. A. (1946). Friedrich Erismann: The dawn of Russian hygiene and public health. Bulletin of the History of Medicine, 20(1), 1–9.
- Sikorsky, I. I. (1938). The Story of the Winged-S: An Autobiography. Dodd, Mead.
- Todes, D. P. (1995). Pavlov and the Bolsheviks. History and Philosophy of the Life Sciences, 17(3), 379–418.
- Todes, D. P. (1997). Pavlov's physiology factory. Isis, 88(2), 205–246.
- Todes, D. P. (2014). Ivan Pavlov: A Russian Life in Science. Oxford University Press.
- Tropp, E. A., Frenkel, V. Ya., & Chernin, A. D. (1993). Alexander A. Friedmann: The Man Who Made the Universe Expand. Cambridge University Press.
- Vucinich, A. (1967). Mendeleev's views on science and society. Isis, 58(3), 342–351.

== Historiography ==
- Aronova, E. (2017). Recent trends in the historiography of science in the Cold War. Historical Studies in the Natural Sciences, 47(4), 568–577.
- Dufaud, G., & Bainbridge, A. (2019). The history of science and technology, or how to grasp heterogeneity. Kritika: Explorations in Russian and Eurasian History, 20(4), 813–822.
- Joravsky, D. (1955). Soviet views on the history of science. Isis, 46(1), 3–13.
- Kojevnikov, A. (2008). The phenomenon of Soviet science. Osiris, 23(1), 115–135.
- Rocke, A. J. (1981). Kekulé, Butlerov, and the historiography of the theory of chemical structure. The British Journal for the History of Science, 14(1), 27–57.
- Vucinich, A. (1963–1970). Science in Russian Culture (2 vols.). Stanford University Press.
- Vucinich, A. (1982). Soviet Marxism and the history of science. The Russian Review, 41(2), 123–143.

== Academic journals ==
Very few journals are dedicated specifically to the history of science and technology in Russia and the Soviet Union; the specialist journal is listed first, followed by general history of science and technology journals and Russian, Soviet, and Slavic studies journals that regularly publish work in this field.

Specialist journal

- Voprosy istorii estestvoznaniia i tekhniki (VIET; Studies in the History of Science and Technology). Institute for the History of Science and Technology, Russian Academy of Sciences (1980–present). ISSN 0205-9606. [In Russian, with English abstracts.]

History of science, technology, and medicine

- Isis. University of Chicago Press for the History of Science Society.
- Technology and Culture. Johns Hopkins University Press for the Society for the History of Technology.
- History and Technology. Taylor & Francis.
- Annals of Science. Taylor & Francis.
- British Journal for the History of Science. Cambridge University Press for the British Society for the History of Science.
- Historical Studies in the Natural Sciences. University of California Press.
- IEEE Annals of the History of Computing. IEEE Computer Society.

Russian, Soviet, and Slavic studies

- Kritika: Explorations in Russian and Eurasian History. Slavica Publishers.
- Slavic Review. Cambridge University Press for the Association for Slavic, East European, and Eurasian Studies.
- The Russian Review. Wiley.
- Russian History. Brill.
- Europe-Asia Studies. Taylor & Francis.
- Russian Studies in History. Taylor & Francis.

== See also ==
- Bibliography of Russian history
- Bibliography of the Soviet Union
