= Bibliography of Russian and Soviet industrialization =

Bibliography of works about Russian and Soviet Industrialization

This is a select bibliography of academic level English language books (including translations) and journal articles, published mainly post World War II, (Note: works published during or before World War II should be limited to areas where there is no significant post World War II books on the subject or when the work in question has significant historical merit.) about the history of industrialization in Russia and the Soviet Union.

Works listed here are cited in the notes or bibliographies of scholarly sources. Each is published by an academic or major press, written by a recognized expert, or substantially reviewed in scholarly journals; borderline cases are omitted. A selection of primary sources are included. Many of the books below carry their own bibliographies; see the Further reading section for other bibliographies, and the External links section for historical sites, academic sites, and museums.

Citations follow APA style. (Note: Entries are in plain text APA 7 format without templates; templates are used only for reviews and notes.) Book have citations to academic journal or mainstream published reviews when available. For books only partly about the subject, relevant chapter or section titles are provided when useful and available. Translators of the original-language edition are included when possible. In cases where a title or name has appeared with more than one English spelling, the most recent published form is used and a footnote documents any earlier title under which the work appeared.

== Industrialization ==
- Allen, R. C. (2003). Farm to Factory: A Reinterpretation of the Soviet Industrial Revolution. Princeton University Press.
- Amann, R., Cooper, J., & Davies, R. W. (Eds.). (1977). The Technological Level of Soviet Industry. Yale University Press.
- Andrle, V. (1985). How backward workers became Soviet: Industrialization of labour and the politics of efficiency under the Second Five-Year Plan, 1933–1937. Social History, 10(2), 147–169.
- Bohlinger, V. (2013). The development of sound technology in the Soviet film industry during the first Five-Year Plan. Studies in Russian and Soviet Cinema, 7(2), 189–205.
- Clark, M. G. (1952). Development of large-scale organization: The Soviet steel industry. The Journal of Economic History, 12(4), 396–410.
- Conyngham, W. (2011). The Modernization of Soviet Industrial Management: Socioeconomic Development and the Search for Viability (Cambridge Russian, Soviet and Post-Soviet Studies). Cambridge: Cambridge University Press.
- Davies, R. W. (1980). The Socialist Offensive: The Collectivisation of Soviet Agriculture, 1929–1930. Harvard University Press.
- Davies, R. W. (1984). The socialist market: A debate in Soviet industry, 1932–33. Slavic Review, 43(2), 201–223.
- Davies, R. W. (1989). The Industrialisation of Soviet Russia. Vol. 3: The Soviet Economy in Turmoil, 1929–1930. Harvard University Press.
- DeHaan, H. (2016). Stalinist City Planning: Professionals, Performance, and Power. Toronto: University of Toronto Press.
- Figes, O. (2008). The Whisperers: Private Life in Stalin's Russia. New York: Picador.
- Filtzer, D. (2010). Soviet Workers and De-Stalinization: The Consolidation of the Modern System of Soviet Production Relations 1953-1964 (Cambridge Russian, Soviet and Post-Soviet Studies). Cambridge: Cambridge University Press.
- Gregory, P. R., & Lazarev, V. (Eds.). (2003). The Economics of Forced Labor: The Soviet Gulag. Hoover Institution Press.
- Gregory, P., & Markevich, A. (2002). Creating Soviet Industry: The House That Stalin Built. Slavic Review, 61(4), 787–814.
- Harrison, M. (Ed.). (2008). Guns and Rubles: The Defense Industry in the Stalinist State. Yale University Press.
- Ings, S. (2017). Stalin and the Scientists: A History of Triumph and Tragedy, 1905-1953. New York: Atlantic Monthly Press.
- Josephson, P. (2017). Stalin’s water workers and their heritage: Industrialising nature in Russia, 1950–present. Global Environment, 10(1), 168–201.
- Kochetkova, E., & Popov, A. (2022). Socialist construction for Siberia: Comecon cooperation and the making of Ust’-Ilimsk forest industrial complex in the USSR, 1970s and 1980s. Journal of Contemporary History, 57(2), 479–498.
- Kotkin, S. (1995). Magnetic Mountain: Stalinism as a Civilization. University of California Press.
- Kragh, M. (2013). The Soviet enterprise: What have we learned from the archives?. Enterprise & Society, 14(2), 360–394.
- Kuromiya, H. (1990). Stalin's Industrial Revolution: Politics and Workers, 1928–1932. Cambridge, UK: Cambridge University Press.
- Liber, G. (2010). Soviet Nationality Policy, Urban Growth, and Identity Change in the Ukrainian SSR 1923-1934 (Cambridge Russian, Soviet and Post-Soviet Studies). Cambridge: Cambridge University Press.
- Oushakine, S. (2014). "Against the Cult of Things": On Soviet Productivism, Storage Economy, and Commodities with No Destination. The Russian Review, 73(2), 198–236.
- Parker, W. H. (1980). The Soviet motor industry. Soviet Studies, 32(4), 515–541.
- Ruder, C. A. (2019). Building Stalinism: The Moscow Canal and the Creation of Soviet Space. London: I.B. Tauris.
- Sanchez-Sibony, O. (2014). Depression Stalinism: The Great Break reconsidered. Kritika: Explorations in Russian and Eurasian History, 15(1), 23–49.
- Shearer, D. R. (1991). The language and politics of socialist rationalization: Productivity, industrial relations, and the social origins of Stalinism at the end of NEP. Cahiers du Monde russe et soviétique, 32(4), 581–608.
- Shearer, D. R. (2018). Industry, State, and Society in Stalin's Russia, 1926–1934. Ithaca: Cornell University Press.
- Siegelbaum, L. (1984). Soviet Norm Determination in Theory and Practice, 1917–1941. Soviet Studies, 36(1), 45–68.
- Siegelbaum, L., & Suny, R. G. (1993). Making the command economy: Western historians on Soviet industrialization. International Labor and Working-Class History, (43), 65–76.
- Stone, D. (2005). First Five-Year Plan and the Geography of Soviet Defence Industry. Europe-Asia Studies, 57(7), 1047–1063.
- Stone, D. R. (2000). Hammer and Rifle: The Militarization of the Soviet Union, 1926–1933. University Press of Kansas.
- Stone, D. R. (2005). The first Five-Year Plan and the geography of Soviet defence industry. Europe-Asia Studies, 57(7), 1047–1063.
- Wheatcroft, S. G., Davies, R. W., & Cooper, J. M. (1986). Soviet industrialization reconsidered: Some preliminary conclusions about economic development between 1926 and 1941. The Economic History Review, 39(2), 264–294.
- Zubovich, K. (2020). The Fall of the Zariad´e: Monumentalism and Displacement in Late Stalinist Moscow. Kritika: Explorations in Russian and Eurasian History, 21(1), 73–95

== Industrial agriculture ==
- Davies, R. W. (1980). The Industrialization of Soviet Russia, The Soviet Collective Farm, 1929–1930. London: Palgrave.

== Mining ==
For works about Geology, see Bibliography of Russian and Soviet science (Physical sciences)#Geology.

- Conquest, R. (1978). Kolyma: The Arctic Death Camps. Oxford University Press.
- Friedgut, T. H. (1989). Iuzovka and Revolution, Volume I: Life and Work in Russia's Donbass, 1869–1924. Princeton University Press.
- Friedgut, T. H. (1994). Iuzovka and Revolution, Volume II: Politics and Revolution in Russia's Donbass, 1869–1924. Princeton University Press.
- Kuromiya, H. (1998). Freedom and Terror in the Donbas: A Ukrainian-Russian Borderland, 1870s–1990s. Cambridge University Press.
- Osokina, E. (2021). Stalin's Quest for Gold: The Torgsin Hard-Currency Shops and Soviet Industrialization. Cornell University Press.
- Siegelbaum, L. H., & Walkowitz, D. J. (1995). Workers of the Donbass Speak: Survival and Identity in the New Ukraine, 1989–1992. State University of New York Press.
- Wynn, C. (1992). Workers, Strikes, and Pogroms: The Donbass-Dnepr Bend in Late Imperial Russia, 1870–1905. Princeton University Press.
- Bruno, A. (2016). A Eurasian mineralogy: Aleksandr Fersman’s conception of the natural world. Isis, 107(3), 518–539.
- Healey, D. (2015). Lives in the balance: Weak and disabled prisoners and the biopolitics of the Gulag. Kritika: Explorations in Russian and Eurasian History, 16(3), 527–556.
- Johnstone, F. (1989). Rand and Kolyma: Afro-Siberian Hamlet. South African Sociological Review, 1(2), 1–45.
- Josephson, P. (2011). Technology and the conquest of the Soviet Arctic. The Russian Review, 70(3), 419–439.
- Kirk, T. C. (2020). Memory of Vorkuta: A Gulag returnee’s attempts at autobiography and art. Kritika: Explorations in Russian and Eurasian History, 21(1), 97–126.
- Nakonechnyi, M. (2022). Gulag medical releases: A response to Stephen G. Wheatcroft. Kritika: Explorations in Russian and Eurasian History, 23(4), 873–898.
- Nordlander, D. J. (1998). Origins of a Gulag capital: Magadan and Stalinist control in the early 1930s. Slavic Review, 57(4), 791–812.
- Rosefielde, S. (1981). An assessment of the sources and uses of Gulag forced labour, 1929–56. Soviet Studies, 33(1), 51–87.
- Siegelbaum, L. H. (1986). The making of Stakhanovites, 1935–36. Russian History, 13(2/3), 259–292.
- Welsh, J. (2024). Tukhta: Labour and resistance in the audit regime of the Soviet Gulag. Labor History, 65(1), 121–141.
- Wheatcroft, S. G. (1981). On assessing the size of forced concentration camp labour in the Soviet Union, 1929–56. Soviet Studies, 33(2), 265–295.

== Railroads ==
- Haywood, R. M. (1969). The Beginnings of Railway Development in Russia in the Reign of Nicholas I, 1835–1842. Duke University Press.
- Haywood, R. M. (1998). Russia Enters the Railway Age, 1842–1855. East European Monographs.
- Heywood, A. J. (1999). Modernising Lenin's Russia: Economic Reconstruction, Foreign Trade and the Railways. Cambridge University Press.
- Marks, S. G. (1991). Road to Power: The Trans-Siberian Railroad and the Colonization of Asian Russia, 1850–1917. Cornell University Press.
- Payne, M. J. (2001). Stalin's Railroad: Turksib and the Building of Socialism. University of Pittsburgh Press.
- Tupper, H. (1965). To the Great Ocean: Siberia and the Trans-Siberian Railway. Little, Brown.
- Ward, C. J. (2009). Brezhnev's Folly: The Building of BAM and Late Soviet Socialism. University of Pittsburgh Press.
- Westwood, J. N. (1964). A History of Russian Railways. George Allen & Unwin.
- Westwood, J. N. (1982). Soviet Locomotive Technology During Industrialization, 1928–1952. Macmillan.
- Westwood, J. N. (2002). Soviet Railways to Russian Railways. Palgrave Macmillan.
- Wolmar, C. (2013). To the Edge of the World: The Story of the Trans-Siberian Railway. Atlantic Books.
- Bill, V. T. (1956). The early days of Russian railroads. The Russian Review, 15(1), 14–28.
- Heywood, A. J. (2000). Iu. V. Lomonosov and the science of locomotive testing in Russia: First steps, 1895–1901. Transactions of the Newcomen Society, 72(1), 1–15.
- Heywood, A. J. (2012). War, civil war and the ‘restoration’ of Russia’s industrial infrastructure, 1914–25: The fate of the railway locomotive stock. Revolutionary Russia, 25(1), 31–59.
- Kleespies, I. (2018). Riding the Soviet iron horse: A reading of Viktor Turin’s Turksib through the lens of John Ford. Slavic Review, 77(2), 358–389.
- Mirski, M. S. (1954). The Soviet railway system: Policy and operation. The Russian Review, 13(1), 18–32.
- Payne, M. (1988). The TurkSib: First born of the Five-Year Plan. Russian History, 15(2/4), 353–414.
- Ward, C. J. (2001). Selling the “project of the century”: Perceptions of the Baikal-Amur Mainline Railway (BAM) in the Soviet press, 1974–1984. Canadian Slavonic Papers, 43(1), 75–95.
- Westwood, J. N. (1959). Soviet railway development. Soviet Studies, 11(1), 22–48.
- Wolff, D. (1996). Between war and revolution: Railway brigades in Siberia, 1905–1907. Russian History, 23(1/4), 95–111.

== Academic journals ==
Very few journals are dedicated specifically to the history of science and technology in Russia and the Soviet Union; the specialist journal is listed first, followed by general history of science and technology journals and Russian, Soviet, and Slavic studies journals that regularly publish work in this field.

Specialist journal

- Voprosy istorii estestvoznaniia i tekhniki (VIET; Studies in the History of Science and Technology). Institute for the History of Science and Technology, Russian Academy of Sciences (1980–present). ISSN 0205-9606. [In Russian, with English abstracts.]

History of science, technology, and medicine

- Isis. University of Chicago Press for the History of Science Society.
- Technology and Culture. Johns Hopkins University Press for the Society for the History of Technology.
- History and Technology. Taylor & Francis.
- Annals of Science. Taylor & Francis.
- British Journal for the History of Science. Cambridge University Press for the British Society for the History of Science.
- Historical Studies in the Natural Sciences. University of California Press.
- IEEE Annals of the History of Computing. IEEE Computer Society.

Russian, Soviet, and Slavic studies

- Kritika: Explorations in Russian and Eurasian History. Slavica Publishers.
- Slavic Review. Cambridge University Press for the Association for Slavic, East European, and Eurasian Studies.
- The Russian Review. Wiley.
- Russian History. Brill.
- Europe-Asia Studies. Taylor & Francis.
- Russian Studies in History. Taylor & Francis.

== See also ==
- Bibliography of Russian history
- Bibliography of the Soviet Union
