= Bibliography of Russian and Soviet science: Military technology =

Bibliography of works about Russian and Soviet military technology

This is a select bibliography of academic level English language books (including translations) and journal articles, published mainly post World War II, (Note: works published during or before World War II should be limited to areas where there is no significant post World War II books on the subject or when the work in question has significant historical merit.) about the history of technology in Russia and the Soviet Union.

For other areas of science, please see:

Works listed here are cited in the notes or bibliographies of scholarly sources. Each is published by an academic or major press, written by a recognized expert, or substantially reviewed in scholarly journals; borderline cases are omitted. A selection of primary sources are included. Many of the books below carry their own bibliographies; see the Further reading section for other bibliographies, and the External links section for historical sites, academic sites, and museums.

Citations follow APA style. (Note: Entries are in plain text APA 7 format without templates; templates are used only for reviews and notes.) Book have citations to academic journal or mainstream published reviews when available. For books only partly about the subject, relevant chapter or section titles are provided when useful and available. Translators of the original-language edition are included when possible. In cases where a title or name has appeared with more than one English spelling, the most recent published form is used and a footnote documents any earlier title under which the work appeared.

== Military Technology ==
- Andrews, J. T. (2009). Red Cosmos: K. E. Tsiolkovskii, Grandfather of Soviet Rocketry. Texas A&M University Press.
- Barber, J., & Harrison, M. (Eds.). (2000). The Soviet Defence-Industry Complex from Stalin to Khrushchev. Macmillan.
- Chertok, B. E. (2005–2011). Rockets and People (Vols. 1–4; A. A. Siddiqi, Ed.). NASA History Series.
- Chivers, C. J. (2010). The Gun. Simon & Schuster.
- Harrison, M. (Ed.). (2008). Guns and Rubles: The Defense Industry in the Stalinist State. Yale University Press.
- Huchthausen, P. A. (2002). K-19: The widowmaker: The secret story of the Soviet nuclear submarine. National Geographic Society.
- Laird, R. F., & Herspring, D. R. (1984). The Soviet Union and the Strategic Arms Race. Proceedings of the Academy of Political Science, 35(3), 184–195.
- Oreskes, N., & Krige, J. (Eds.). (2014). Science and Technology in the Global Cold War. The MIT Press.
- Samuelson, L. (2000). Plans for Stalin's War Machine: Tukhachevskii and Military-Economic Planning, 1925–1941. St. Martin's Press.
- Siddiqi, A. A. (2010). The Red Rockets' Glare: Spaceflight and the Russian Imagination, 1857–1957. Cambridge University Press.
- Stone, D. R. (2000). Hammer and Rifle: The Militarization of the Soviet Union, 1926–1933. University Press of Kansas.
- Zaloga, S. J. (2002). The Kremlin's Nuclear Sword: The Rise and Fall of Russia's Strategic Nuclear Forces, 1945–2000. Smithsonian Institution Press.
- Zaloga, S. J., & Grandsen, J. (1984). Soviet Tanks and Combat Vehicles of World War Two. Arms and Armour Press.

=== Weapons of mass destruction ===
==== Nuclear weapons ====
- Cochran, T. B., Norris, R. S., & Bukharin, O. A. (1995). Making the Russian Bomb: From Stalin to Yeltsin. Westview Press.
- Craig, C., & Radchenko, S. (2008). The Atomic Bomb and the Origins of the Cold War. Yale University Press.
- Evangelista, M. (1988). Innovation and the Arms Race: How the United States and the Soviet Union Develop New Military Technologies. Cornell University Press.
- Gobarev, V. M. (1999). Soviet policy toward China: Developing nuclear weapons, 1949–1969. The Journal of Slavic Military Studies, 12(4), 1–53.
- Gordin, M. D. (2009). Red Cloud at Dawn: Truman, Stalin, and the End of the Atomic Monopoly. Farrar, Straus and Giroux.
- Gorelik, G. (1999). The metamorphosis of Andrei Sakharov. Scientific American, 280(3), 98–101.
- Herken, G. (2009). Target Enormoz: Soviet nuclear espionage on the West Coast of the United States, 1942–1950. Journal of Cold War Studies, 11(3), 68–90.
- Holloway, D. (1981). Entering the nuclear arms race: The Soviet decision to build the atomic bomb, 1939–45. Social Studies of Science, 11(2), 159–197.
- Holloway, D. (1994). Stalin and the Bomb: The Soviet Union and Atomic Energy, 1939–1956. Yale University Press.
- Josephson, P. R. (1999). Red Atom: Russia's Nuclear Power Program from Stalin to Today. W. H. Freeman.
- Krige, J., & Barth, K.-H. (Eds.). (2006). Global Power Knowledge: Science and Technology in International Affairs. University of Chicago Press.
- Marsh, R. J. (1986). Soviet fiction and the nuclear debate. Soviet Studies, 38(2), 248–270.
- Meyer, S., Bidgood, S., & Potter, W. C. (2020). Death dust: The little-known story of U.S. and Soviet pursuit of radiological weapons. International Security, 45(2), 51–94.
- Oreskes, N., & Krige, J. (Eds.). (2014). Science and Technology in the Global Cold War. MIT Press.
- Podvig, P. (Ed.). (2001). Russian Strategic Nuclear Forces. MIT Press.
- Polmar, N., & Moore, K. J. (2004). Cold War Submarines: The Design and Construction of U.S. and Soviet Submarines, 1945–2001. Potomac Books.
- Rhodes, R. (1995). Dark Sun: The Making of the Hydrogen Bomb. Simon & Schuster.
- Rindzevičiūtė, E. (2016). The Power of Systems: How Policy Sciences Opened Up the Cold War World. Cornell University Press.
- Solovey, M. (2001). Introduction: Science and the state during the Cold War: Blurred boundaries and a contested legacy. Social Studies of Science, 31(2), 165–170.
- Zaloga, S. J. (2002). The Kremlin's Nuclear Sword: The Rise and Fall of Russia's Strategic Nuclear Forces, 1945–2000. Smithsonian Institution Press.

==== Chemical weapons ====
- Averre, D. (1999). Chemical weapons in Russia: After the CWC. European Security, 8(4), 130–164.
- Bartley, R. L., & Kucewicz, W. P. (1983). "Yellow rain" and the future of arms agreements. Foreign Affairs, 61(4), 805–826.
- Chai, P. R., Hayes, B. D., Erickson, T. B., & Boyer, E. W. (2018). Novichok agents: A historical, current, and toxicological perspective. Toxicology Communications, 2(1), 45–48.
- Mirzayanov, V. S. (2009). State Secrets: An Insider's Chronicle of the Russian Chemical Weapons Program. Outskirts Press. [Primary/insider source]
- Tucker, J. B. (1996). Viewpoint: Converting former Soviet chemical weapons plants. The Nonproliferation Review, 4(1), 78–89.

==== Biological weapons ====
- Abramova, F. A., Grinberg, L. M., Yampolskaya, O. V., & Walker, D. H. (1993). Pathology of inhalational anthrax in 42 cases from the Sverdlovsk outbreak of 1979. Proceedings of the National Academy of Sciences of the United States of America, 90(6), 2291–2294.
- Alibek, K., & Handelman, S. (1999). Biohazard: The Chilling True Story of the Largest Covert Biological Weapons Program in the World—Told from the Inside by the Man Who Ran It. Random House. [Primary/insider source]
- Gordin, M. D. (1997). The anthrax solution: The Sverdlovsk incident and the resolution of a biological weapons controversy. Journal of the History of Biology, 30(3), 441–480.
- Guillemin, J. (1999). Anthrax: The Investigation of a Deadly Outbreak. University of California Press.
- Guillemin, J. (2002). The 1979 anthrax epidemic in the USSR: Applied science and political controversy. Proceedings of the American Philosophical Society, 146(1), 18–36.
- Harris, E. D. (1987). Sverdlovsk and yellow rain: Two cases of Soviet noncompliance?. International Security, 11(4), 41–95.
- Leitenberg, M., Zilinskas, R. A., & Kuhn, J. H. (2012). The Soviet Biological Weapons Program: A History. Harvard University Press.
- McLeish, C. (2010). Opening up the secret city of Stepnogorsk: Biological weapons in the former Soviet Union. Area, 42(1), 60–69.
- Meselson, M., Guillemin, J., Hugh-Jones, M., Langmuir, A., Popova, I., Shelokov, A., & Yampolskaya, O. (1994). The Sverdlovsk anthrax outbreak of 1979. Science, 266(5188), 1202–1208.
- Tucker, J. B. (1999). Bioweapons from Russia: Stemming the flow. Issues in Science and Technology, 15(3), 34–38.

=== Military naval technology ===
- Hauner, M. L. (2004). Stalin's big-fleet program. Naval War College Review, 57(2), 87–120.
- Hill, A. (2007). Russian and Soviet naval power and the Arctic from the XVI century to the beginning of the Great Patriotic War. Journal of Slavic Military Studies, 20(3), 359–392.
- Huchthausen, P. A. (2002). K-19: The widowmaker: The secret story of the Soviet nuclear submarine. National Geographic Society.
- Huchthausen, P. A., Kurdin, I., & White, R. A. (1997). Hostile waters. St. Martin's Press.
- Matala, S. (2019). Flashy flagships of Cold War cooperation: The Finnish-Soviet nuclear icebreaker project. Technology and Culture, 60(2), 347–377.
- McLaughlin, S. (2003). Russian and Soviet Battleships. Naval Institute Press.
- Tredrea, J., & Sozaev, E. (2010). Russian Warships in the Age of Sail, 1696–1860: Design, Construction, Careers and Fates. Seaforth Publishing.
- Walters, W. D., Jr. (1995). The changing geography of Russian/Soviet naval construction, 1890–1989. Post-Soviet Geography, 36(3), 157–175.
- Watts, A. J. (1990). The Imperial Russian Navy. Arms and Armour Press.
- Wright, C. C. (1972). Cruisers of the Imperial Russian Navy: Part 1. Warship International, 9(1), 28–52.
- Wright, C. C. (1975). Cruisers of the Imperial Russian Navy: Part 2. Warship International, 12(3), 205–223.
- Wright, C. C. (1976). Imperial Russian cruisers: Part 3. Warship International, 13(2), 123–147.
- Wright, C. C. (1977). Imperial Russian cruisers: Part 4. Warship International, 14(1), 53–77.
- Wright, C. C. (1978). Soviet cruisers: Part I. Warship International, 15(1), 10–41.
- Yegorova, N. I. (2005). Stalin's conception of maritime power: Revelations from the Russian archives. Journal of Strategic Studies, 28(2), 157–186.

=== Military aviation ===
- Boyd, A. (1977). The Soviet Air Force Since 1918. Macdonald and Jane's.
- Bailes, K. E. (1976). Technology and legitimacy: Soviet aviation and Stalinism in the 1930s. Technology and Culture, 17(1), 55–81.
- Gordon, Y., & Komissarov, D. (2013). Soviet and Russian Testbed Aircraft. Hikoki Publications.
- Gorman, G. S. (1998). The Tu-4: The travails of technology transfer by imitation. Air Power History, 45(1), 16–27.
- Gormly, J. (2013). The counter iron curtain: Crafting an American–Soviet bloc civil aviation policy: 1942–1960. Diplomatic History, 37(2), 248–279.
- Gunston, B. (1995). The Osprey Encyclopedia of Russian Aircraft, 1875–1995. Osprey Publishing.
- Hardesty, V., & Grinberg, I. (2012). Red Phoenix Rising: The Soviet Air Force in World War II (Rev. ed.). University Press of Kansas.
- Harvey, A. D. (2018). The Russian air force versus the Luftwaffe: A Western European view. Air Power History, 65(1), 23–30.
- Palmer, S. W. (2000). Peasants into pilots: Soviet air-mindedness as an ideology of dominance. Technology and Culture, 41(1), 1–26.
- Palmer, S. W. (2006). Dictatorship of the Air: Aviation Culture and the Fate of Modern Russia. Cambridge University Press.

== Academic journals ==
Very few journals are dedicated specifically to the history of science and technology in Russia and the Soviet Union; the specialist journal is listed first, followed by general history of science and technology journals and Russian, Soviet, and Slavic studies journals that regularly publish work in this field.

Specialist journal

- Voprosy istorii estestvoznaniia i tekhniki (VIET; Studies in the History of Science and Technology). Institute for the History of Science and Technology, Russian Academy of Sciences (1980–present). ISSN 0205-9606. [In Russian, with English abstracts.]

History of science, technology, and medicine

- Isis. University of Chicago Press for the History of Science Society.
- Technology and Culture. Johns Hopkins University Press for the Society for the History of Technology.
- History and Technology. Taylor & Francis.
- Annals of Science. Taylor & Francis.
- British Journal for the History of Science. Cambridge University Press for the British Society for the History of Science.
- Historical Studies in the Natural Sciences. University of California Press.
- IEEE Annals of the History of Computing. IEEE Computer Society.

Russian, Soviet, and Slavic studies

- Kritika: Explorations in Russian and Eurasian History. Slavica Publishers.
- Slavic Review. Cambridge University Press for the Association for Slavic, East European, and Eurasian Studies.
- The Russian Review. Wiley.
- Russian History. Brill.
- Europe-Asia Studies. Taylor & Francis.
- Russian Studies in History. Taylor & Francis.

== See also ==
- Bibliography of Russian history
- Bibliography of the Soviet Union
