= All-Russian Scientific Research and Design Institute of Energy Technology =

Research institute in Saint Petersburg, Russia

Coordinates: 59°59′01″N 30°15′54″E

All-Russian Scientific Research And Design Institute of Energy Technology
- Type: Open Joint Stock Company
- Founded: 1933
- Headquarters: Saint Petersburg, Russia
- Website: vnipiet.ru

All-Russian Scientific Research And Design Institute Of Energy Technology (VNIPIET) (Russian: Головной институт «ВНИПИЭТ») is a research institute in Saint Petersburg, Russia.

VNIPIET prepares designs and project documentation for the construction, reconstruction, and technical refurbishment of atomic power stations. It is associated with many major projects in this field, including design of the containment sarcophagus for the damaged reactor at Chernobyl. It also does design work for radiochemical, metallurgical, mechanical, and instrument-engineering plants and performs research work on decontamination and removal of radioactive contamination and transportation of radioactive waste.

== See also ==
- Bibliography of science and technology in Russia and the Soviet Union
