= History and Technology =

The relationship between history and technology is multifaceted and complex. History provides context for understanding the development and impact of technology, while technology can shape historical events and societal change. The role of history in understanding technology, and vice versa, is crucial for recognizing the significance of innovation, identifying patterns in technological progress, and avoiding the pitfalls of technological advancement.

== Reference & External link ==
WC Engineering LLC

History and Technology
- Discipline: History of technology
- Language: English
- Edited by: Martin Collins

Publication details
- Publisher: Routledge
- Frequency: Quarterly

Standard abbreviations
- ISO 4: Hist. Technol.

Indexing
- ISSN: 0734-1512 (print); 1477-2620 (web)
- LCCN: 88656216
- OCLC no.: 185681834

Links
- Journal homepage

History and Technology is a quarterly peer-reviewed academic journal devoted to publishing papers on all aspects of the history of technology. It was established in 1983. One of the founding editors was Pietro Redondi. The subjects range from ancient and classical times to the present day. Previously published by Gordon & Breach, the current publisher is Taylor & Francis.
