= The Russian Review =

- Discipline: Russian studies
- Language: English
- Edited by: Erik R. Scott

Publication details
- History: 1941–present
- Publisher: Wiley-Blackwell for the University of Kansas
- Frequency: Quarterly

Standard abbreviations
- ISO 4: Russ. Rev.

Indexing
- ISSN: 0036-0341 (print); 1467-9434 (web)
- LCCN: 43016148
- JSTOR: russianreview
- OCLC no.: 473067959

Links
- Journal homepage

The Russian Review is an independent peer-reviewed multi-disciplinary academic journal devoted to the history, literature, culture, fine arts, cinema, society, and politics of the Russian Federation, former Soviet Union and former Russian Empire. The journal was established in 1941 and is published quarterly by Wiley-Blackwell for the Contact Center for Russian, East European & Eurasian Studies at the University of Kansas. The former editor is Dr. Eve Levin, University of Kansas who retired and was replaced by Erik R. Scott in 2020.

The Russian Review focuses upon the history, politics, and culture of Russia and the countries of Eastern Europe, and Central Asia, with an emphasis upon the republics of the Soviet Union and its successor states. The journal's board of trustees is not aligned with any national, political, or professional association.

== History of the Journal ==
The Russian Review was founded by a small group of Russian émigrés, including Professor Dmitri Von Mohrenschildt, and American historian and journalist turned anti-Soviet advocate William Henry Chamberlin, who were looking to establish the first American academic journal focused on the history and society of Russia and the Soviet Union.

The journal's first issue was published in November 1941 during the wake of Nazi Germany's invasion of the Soviet Union. The first issue of the magazine included texts by the author Vladimir Nabokov, activist Hélène Iswolsky, and historian and "father" of Slavic Studies in the United States, Michael Karpovich.

From its founding, the journal was critical of the Soviet system.

Early issues of the journal were interested in portraying an accurate historic and sociocultural image of Russia and the Soviet Union to the United States.
