= Historical Studies in the Natural Sciences =

- Discipline: History of science
- Language: English

Publication details
- Former name(s): Historical Studies in the Physical Sciences, Historical Studies in the Physical and Biological Sciences, Chymia
- History: 1948–present
- Publisher: University of California Press (United States)
- Frequency: 5/year
- Impact factor: 0.417 (2018)

Standard abbreviations
- ISO 4: Hist. Stud. Nat. Sci.

Indexing
- ISSN: 1939-1811 (print); 1939-182X (web)
- Historical Studies in the Physical and Biological Sciences
- ISSN: 0890-9997

Links
- Journal homepage; Online access; Online archive

Historical Studies in the Natural Sciences is a peer-reviewed academic journal published by the University of California Press on behalf of the Office for History of Science and Technology (University of California, Berkeley). It was established as Chymia in 1948, being published under than name until 1967 when it temporarily ceased publication. It resumed under Historical Studies in the Physical Sciences in 1969, renaming itself Historical Studies in the Physical and Biological Sciences in 1986 under John L. Heilbron, an acquiring its current name in 2008.

It covers the study of the intellectual and social history of the physical sciences (including physics, chemistry, and astronomy) and the biological sciences (including biology, biophysics, and genetics), from the 17th century to the modern era.

Russell McCormmach, who edited the first ten annual volumes of Historical Studies in the Physical Sciences. John L. Heilbron took over as editor in 1980 and in 1985 added "Biological" to the title. In 2008, Cathryn Carson took over as editor-in-chief.

== Abstracting and indexing ==
The journal is abstracted and indexed in:

- America: History and Life
- Arts and Humanities Citation Index
- British Humanities Index
- Chemical Abstracts
- Current Contents/Arts & Humanities
- Current Contents/Life Sciences
- Expanded Academic ASAP
- FRANCIS
- ProQuest
- Russian Academy of Sciences Bibliographies
- Scopus
- Social Sciences Citation Index

According to the Journal Citation Reports, the journal has a 2018 impact factor of 0.417.
