= Russian History (Brill journal) =

- Discipline: History of Russia, Slavic and Eurasian studies
- Language: English
- Edited by: Lawrence N. Langer

Publication details
- History: 1974-present
- Publisher: Verlag Ferdinand Schöningh
- Frequency: Quarterly
- Open access: Hybrid

Standard abbreviations
- ISO 4: Russ. Hist.
- NLM: Russ Hist (Pittsburgh)

Indexing
- ISSN: 0094-288X (print); 1876-3316 (web)
- LCCN: 2009233355
- JSTOR: 0094288X
- OCLC no.: 244771048

Links
- Journal homepage

Russian History is a quarterly peer-reviewed academic journal covering research on the history of Russia, Slavic studies, and Eurasian studies published by Brill Publications under its imprint Verlag Ferdinand Schöningh. It was established in 1974 and the editor-in-chief is Lawrence N. Langer (University of Connecticut).

== Abstracting and indexing ==
The journal is abstracted and indexed in:

- Arts and Humanities Citation Index
- Current Contents/Arts & Humanities
- EBSCO databases
- Index Islamicus
- Modern Language Association Database
- ProQuest databases
- Scopus
