= West Polesian =

East Slavic microlanguage

- захыднёполіськая мова, полісьська волода
- Native to: Belarus, Ukraine, Poland
- Region: Southwestern Belarus, northwestern Ukraine, bordering regions of Poland
- Language family: Indo-European: Balto-Slavic; Slavic; East Slavic; West Polesian
- Dialects: Motolian
- Writing system: Cyrillic

Language codes
- ISO 639-3: –
- Glottolog: west2977

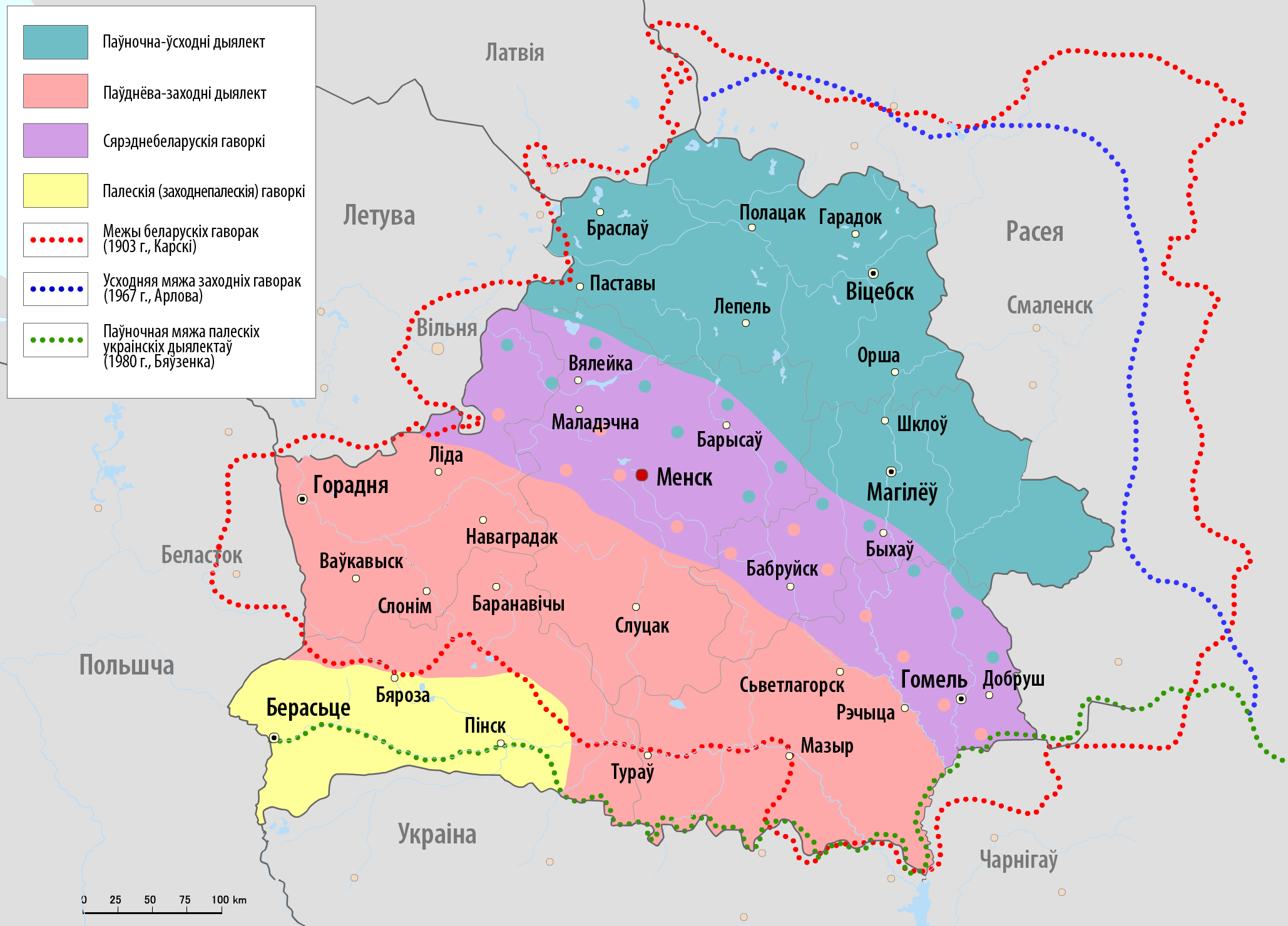
West Polesian (yellow area) amongst the Belarusian dialects

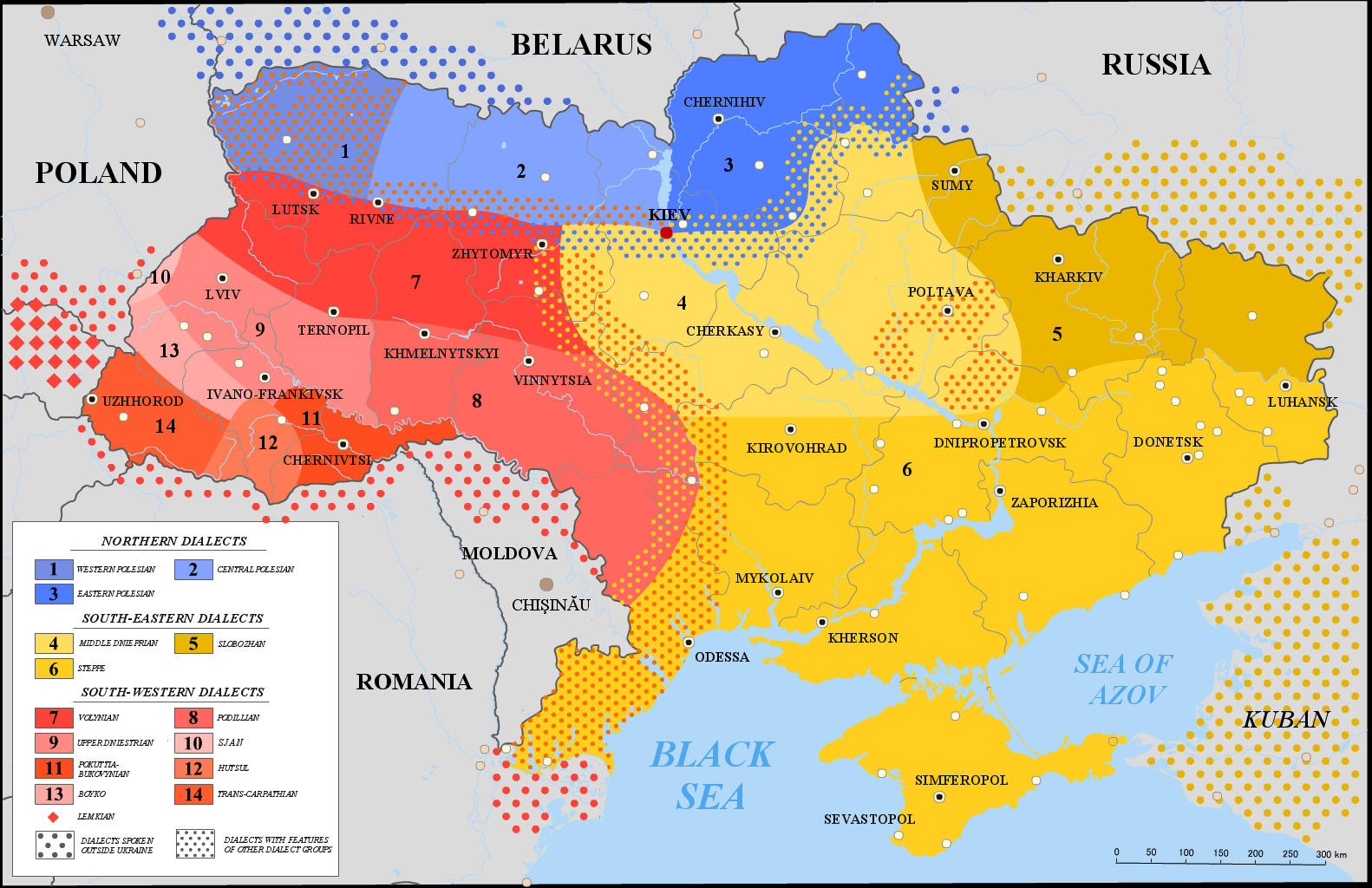
West Polesian (marked with number 1, blue area) amongst the Ukrainian dialects

West Polesian (захыднёполіськая мова, zakhydnyopolis'kaya mova, полісьська волода, polis's'ka voloda) is the East Slavic dialect group (or variety) spoken in southwestern Belarus, in northwestern Ukraine and adjoining regions of Poland. There is controversy regarding whether West Polesian belongs to Belarusian or Ukrainian, or is a separate microlanguage (as has been proposed by linguist Aleksandr Dulichenko).

Various variants or dialects of West Polesian are used in everyday speech. Attempts were made in the 1990s by Nikolai Shelyagovich to develop a standard written language, although his efforts received almost no support and the campaign eventually ceased. In particular, writer Nil Hilevich and some others spoke against Shelyagovich, claiming that he represented a threat to the national integrity of Belarus, and labelled "Yotvingian separatism".

== History ==
The formation of the Polesian literary language itself began in 1988 thanks to the efforts of the philologist and poet Nikolai Shelyagovich. Then the social and cultural association "Polesie" (Полісьсе) was created and the development of a written norm of a special Polesian ("Yotvingian" in the terminology of Shelyagovich and his supporters) language began. In 1990, a constituent conference was held, at which various ethnographic and linguistic problems of Polesia were discussed, and, in particular, the creation of a written Polesian language.

In the newly created literary language in 1988–1990, several inserts with the title "Балесы Полісся" (Pages of Polesia) were published in the Belarusian newspaper "Чырвоная змена" (Chyrvonaja Zmena), several rotary issues of the "information bulletin" (small newspaper) "Zbudinne" ("Awakening"). In 1990–1995, the newspaper "Zbudinne" was published every 2 weeks, was widely sold in newsstands in the Brest Region and in Minsk, and one could subscribe to it. The circulation of the newspaper averaged about 2-2.5 thousand copies. Also in this language were written several theses for the Yotvingian (Polesian) scientific-practical conference, held in Pinsk on April 13–14, 1990. The rest of the abstracts were written in Russian, Belarusian and Ukrainian. In 1992, a book of chess miniatures "Jitveža Šaxova mynjatjura" was published in the Western Polesian language in Shelyagovich's version.

== Phonology ==
⟨ʲ⟩ denotes palatalization, meaning the center of the tongue is raised during and after the articulation of the consonant.

Consonant inventory of West Polesian
	Bilabial		Labio- dental		Dental		Alveolar		Palatal		Retroflex		Velar + pharyng.	
Stop	p	b			t̪	d̪							k	
Fricative			f	v			s	z			ʃ	ʒ	x	ɦ
Affricate			ts						ʃtʃʲ	dʒʲ	tʃ			
Nasal		m						n						
Lateral								lˠ						
Trill								r						
Glide			ʋ							j				

== Orthography ==
=== Shelyagovich's alphabet ===
In 1990, an alphabet was proposed by Nikolai Shelyagovich.

А а	Б б	В в	Г г	Ґ ґ	Д д	Е е	Ё ё	Ж ж	З з	И и
І і	Ј ј	К к	Л л	М м	Н н	О о	П п	Р р	С с	Т т
У у	Ф ф	Х х	Ц ц	Ч ч	Ш ш	Ы ы	Ь ь	Э э	Ю ю	Я я

=== Klimchuk's script ===
Belarusian dialectologist Fyodar Klimchuk recorded spoken texts and wrote translations in the dialect of the author's native village (Simanavichy, Drahichyn District). Among other things, he did translation of the New Testament.

== See also ==
- Beresteishchyna
- Simple speech
