= Motoki Nomachi =

Professor in the Slavic-Eurasian Research Center

Professor Motoki Nomachi
- 野町 素己
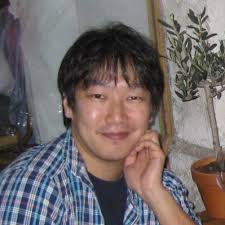
- Born: 1976 (age 49–50); Tokyo, Japan

Academic background
- Education: University of Tokyo

Academic work
- Discipline: Linguist
- Sub-discipline: Slavic microlanguages
- Institutions: Hokkaido University

Motoki Nomachi (野町 素己; born 1976) is a professor in the Slavic-Eurasian Research Center at Hokkaido University, Sapporo, Japan. He specializes in Slavic linguistics and general linguistics, and is an expert on Slavic microlanguages.

== Biography ==
Nomachi was born and raised in Tokyo. He earned his BA in 2000, his MA in Slavic languages and literatures in 2002, and his PhD in 2008, all from the University of Tokyo. In 2002–2003 he continued his education and did research at the University of Belgrade in Serbia. Subsequently, in 2003–2005, he did research and taught Japanese language and culture at the University of Warsaw in Poland. On 1 May 2008 he was employed as associate professor in the Slavic Research Center. Since 2010 Nomachi has acted as General Editor of one of the Center's periodicals, namely, Acta Slavica Iaponica.

== Edited volumes ==
- (co-edited by Tomasz Kamusella and Catherine Gibson) Central Europe through the lens of language and politics: on the sample maps from the Atlas of language politics in modern Central Europe (Ser: Slavic Eurasia papers, Vol 10). 2017. Sapporo : Slavic-Eurasian Research Center, Hokkaido University, 111pp ISBN 9784938637910.
- Serbica iaponica: допринос јапанских слависта српској филологији /Serbica iaponica: doprinos japanskih slavista srpskoj filologiji (Ser: Studije o Srbima, Vol 22; Slavic Eurasian Studies, Vol 31). 2016. Novi Sad: Matica srpska and Sapporo: Slavic-Eurasian Research Center, Hokkaido University, 346pp ISBN 9788679461919
- (co-edited by Tomasz Kamusella and Catherine Gibson) ‘‘The Palgrave Handbook of Slavic Languages, Identities and Borders’’, Palgrave Macmillan, London, 2015.
- (co-edited by Ljudmila Popović) ‘‘The Serbian Language as Viewed by the East and the West: Synchroniy Diachrony, and Typology’’ (Slavic Eurasian Studies, Vol 28), Slavic-Eurasian Research Center, Sapporo, 2015.
- (co-edited by Ljudmila Popović and Dojčil Vojvodić) ‘‘U prostoru lingvističke slavistike: Zbornik naučnih radova povodom 65 godina života akademika Predraga Pipera’’, Filološki fakultet Univerziteta u Beogradu, Beograd, 2015.
- (co-edited by Andrii Danylenko and Predrag Piper) Grammaticalization and lexicalization in the slavic languages: proceedings from the 36th meeting of the Commission on the Grammatical Structure of the Slavic Languages of the International Committee Slavists (Ser: Die Welt der Slaven, Vol 55). 2014. Munich: Sagner, 436pp ISBN 9783866885202.
- (co-edited by Tomasz Kamusella) The multilingual Society Vojvodina: intersecting borders, cultures and identities (Ser: Slavic Eurasia Papers, Vol 6). 2014. Sapporo: Slavic Research Center, Hokkaido University, 119pp ISBN 9784938637781.
- (co-edited by Elżbieta Kaczmarska) ‘‘Slavic and German in Contact: Studies from Areal and Contrastive Linguistics’’, Slavic Research Center, Sapporo, 2014.
- Grammaticalization in Slavic languages: from areal and typological perspectives (Ser: Slavic Eurasian Studies, Vol 23). 2011. Sapporo: Slavic Research Center, Hokkaido University, 230pp ISBN 9784938637583.
- (co-edited by Robert Geenberg) Slavia Islamica: language, religion and identity (Ser: Slavic Eurasian Studies, Vol. 25). 2012. Sapporo: Slavic Research Center, Hokkaido University, 234pp ISBN 9784938637613.
- ‘‘The grammar of possessivity in South Slavic languages: synchronic and diachronic perspectives’’ (Ser: Slavic Eurasian Studies, Vol 24). 2011. Sapporo: Slavic Research Center, Hokkaido University, 138pp ISBN 9784938637668
- Россия и русские глазами инославянских народов: язык, литература, культура /Rossii︠a︡ i russkie glazami inoslavi︠a︡nskikh narodov: i︠a︡zyk, literatura, kulʹtura (Ser: Surabu Yūrashia kenkyū hōkokushū, Vol 3). 2010. Sapporo: Slavic Research Center, Hokkaido University. ISBN 9784938637576.

== Books ==
- (with Yumi Nakajima) ニューエクスプレスセルビア語・クロアチア語 /Nyū ekusupuresu serubiago kuroachiago [New Express Textbook of Serbo-Croatian]. 2010. Tokyo: Hakusuisha, 149pp ISBN 9784560085295.

== Research ==
- Academia.edu Retrieved 2018-09-18
- KAKEN Retrieved 2018-09-18
- Slavic-Eurasian Research Center Retrieved 2018-09-18
