= Slavic Studies (journal) =

- Discipline: Slavistics, Eastern European Studies
- Language: Japanese
- Edited by: Yoko Aoshima

Publication details
- History: 1957–present
- Publisher: Slavic-Eurasian Research Center (Japan)
- Frequency: biannual

Standard abbreviations
- ISO 4: Slav. Stud.

Indexing
- ISSN: 0288-3503

Links
- Journal homepage

Slavic Studies (Japanese: スラヴ研究, Hepburn: Suravu Kenkyū), is a biannual academic journal published in Japanese by the Slavic-Eurasian Research Center at Hokkaido University. Slavic Studies focuses on Slavistics and Eastern European Studies, accepting a wide variety of topics but especially those connected with Japan, including international relations, economics, literary studies and Slavic history. It was and continues to be a print journal, today it is also open access. The first volume of Slavic Studies appeared in 1957.

== History ==
Slavic Studies was originally an annual journal, but once the Slavic Institute at the Faculty of Law became independent from Hokkaido University as the Slavic Research Center in 1978 the journal became biannual.

It originally published the occasional foreign language article, but stopped doing so after the Acta Slavica Iaponica was split off from it in 1983 as Slavistics gained traction in Japan, although each article includes an English or Russian abstract.

There have been a total of 71 volumes as of 2024.

== See also ==
- List of Slavic studies journals

== Sources ==
- "Acta Slavica Iaponica: Journal Information". Central and Eastern European Online Library. Archived from the original on 2017-01-09.
- n.s. (2013). 『スラヴ研究』 [Slavic Studies]. スラブ･ユーラシア研究センター (in Japanese).
- Ieda, Osamu (1991). "Current Survey of Periodicals: Suravu Kenjyu". Japanese Slavic and East European Studies. 12. The Japanese Society for Slavic and East European Studies: 154. doi:10.5823/jsees.12.0_154. ISSN 0389-1186.
- Ito, Takayuki (May 1983). "Slavistik und Osteuropakunde in Japan: I. Geschichte und Entwicklung" [Slavistics and East European Studies in Japan: I. History and Development]. Osteuropa (in German). 33 (5): 400–412. ISSN 0030-6428. JSTOR 44911678.
