= Slovo =

Slovo may refer to:

== Publications ==
- Slovo (newspaper), Bulgaria
- Slovo (US journal), a journal published biannually by the National Czech & Slovak Museum & Library in Cedar Rapids, Iowa
- Slovo (London), a journal of the University College London School of Slavonic and East European Studies
- Slovo (Zagreb), a journal of the Old Church Slavonic Institute

== Surname ==
- Joe Slovo, South African politician
- Gillian Slovo, South African-born British writer
- Robyn Slovo, South African film producer, based in the UK
- Shawn Slovo, South African screenwriter

== Other ==
- Slovo (album), by Arkona
- Slovo (band) a British electronic band
- Slovo Building, Kharkiv, Ukraine
- The acrophonic name of the letter Es (Cyrillic) in the old Russian alphabet
