= Slavic microlanguages =

Linguistic concept

Slavic microlanguages are literary linguistic varieties that exist alongside the better-known Slavic languages of historically prominent nations. The term "literary microlanguages" was coined by Aleksandr Dulichenko in the late 1970s; it subsequently became a standard term in Slavistics.

Slavic microlanguages exist both as geographically and socially peripheral dialects of more well-established Slavic languages and as completely isolated ethnolects. They often enjoy a written form, a certain degree of standardisation and are used in a variety of circumstances typical of codified idioms—albeit in a limited fashion and always alongside a national standard language.

== List of microlanguages ==
In terms of classification, each Slavic literary microlanguage is traced back to one of the major Slavic languages or is closely related to it. Pannonian Rusyn is the only language that poses a challenge in this regard.

=== South Slavic ===
- Slovene
  - Prekmurje Slovene — Prekmurje (north-eastern Slovenia), neighbouring areas of Austria.
  - Resian dialect — Resia Valley (Friuli-Venezia Giulia, Italy).
  - Veneto-Slovene
- Serbo-Croatian
  - Shtokavian
    - Slavomolisano dialect (Molise Croatian) — spoken in the region of Molise (Italy) since the 15th–16th centuries, originally spoken in Dalmatia.
  - Slavonic-Serbian
  - Kajkavian
  - Chakavian
    - Burgenland Croatian (Gradishan Croatian) — Burgenland (Austria) and surrounding areas of Hungary.
- Bulgarian
  - Banat Bulgarian dialect — Banat (Romania and Serbia), spoken since the 18th century.
  - Pomak — spoken by Bulgarian Muslims in Greece (Pomaks).
- Macedonian
  - Slavic dialects of Greece — spoken by Macedonians in Greece. Periodicals and books have been published in different countries, with one primer published in 1925; nowadays, as far as is known, the literary standard is no longer used.

=== West Slavic ===
- Slovak
  - Literary Eastern Slovak — the language of Protestants in eastern Slovakia since the mid-18th century
- Czech
  - Lachian — used by only one author — the poet Óndra Łysohorsky — based on the Silesian dialect
- Polish
  - Vichian — based on the Polish dialects of Lithuania; attempts to introduce a literary standard were made in late 1980s

=== East Slavic ===
- Ukrainian
  - West Polesian (Sudovian/Yotvingian) — south-western Belarus
- Belarusian
  - Halshanish — project to introduce a literary standard based on local Belarusian dialects in Lithuania; used since late 1980s
  - West Polesian (Sudovian/Yotvingian) — south-western Belarus
  - Podlachian (their language) — Podlachia
- Carpathian Rusyn — spoken by Rusyns in the Zakarpattia Oblast, Slovakia, Poland, Hungary

Pannonian (Yugoslav) Rusyn — spoken by Rusyns of Vojvodina and Croatia; genetically, Pannonian Rusyn is related to the Slovak language, however, it has experienced strong substrate and adstrate influence of East Slavic Rusyn dialects. Based on a set of criteria, this language occupies an intermediate position between microlanguages and the main Slavic languages.

According to Aleksandr Dulichenko, the formation process of new literary microlanguages is still ongoing. One example is the Bunjevac literary standard based on Bunjevac dialects of Serbo-Croatian spoken in Vojvodina, introduced at the turn of the 20th century. Bunjevci activists have established National Council of the Bunjevac Ethnic Minority (Nacionalni savet bunjevačke nacionalne manjine) and Bunjevačka matica; Bunjevci themselves are hypothesised to be Catholic Serbs who had once migrated to Vojvodina from Dalmatia and see themselves either as a distinct ethnic group or a subgroup of the Croatian ethnic group. Bunjevačke novine ("Bunjevac Journal") publishes articles in the Bunjevac language, and a number of primary schools have introduced Bunjevac language classes in areas populated by Bunjevci. Silesian and Goral (standard based on the Podhale dialect) may also be considered newly formed Slavic microlanguages. Movement for the creation of literary standards in Silesian and Goral dialects has begun in Southern Poland in the 1990s; such movements are typically decentralised: different communities propose their own writing, orthography and grammar variants. Nonetheless, efforts are made to create literary works in these languages, particularly, the Gospel has been translated into Goral.

== Insular and peripheral microlanguages ==
Native speakers of contemporary Slavic microlanguages either live among unrelated linguistic communities, thereby constituting an ethnic "island", or live on the geographical periphery of their historical ethnic groups. Correspondingly, these microlanguages can be divided into insular and peripheral categories (the latter of which can also be called regional languages). The prominent insular standards are: Rusyn, Burgenland Croatian, Molise Croatian, the Resian dialect (which may also be characterised as "peninsular") and Banat Bulgarian. The peripheral group includes Prekmurje Slovene, Literary Eastern Slovak, Lachian, Carpathian Rusyn, West Polesian and others.

== Functional characteristics ==
The precise hierarchical relationship between national standard languages and microlanguages can be ascertained by examining internal attributes, such as the disparity between strictly enforced standardisation in the case of the former and, in the case of the latter, a more relaxed standard. The national language often displays a standardised spoken form whereas such a regularity is absent from microlanguages (whose spoken form often consists of divergent dialects). Likewise, the difference can be seen in external attributes such as extensive functionality and explored genres in the case of national languages, compared to the narrowness of genres and limited functional role of microlanguages.

As literary microlanguages are, in terms of functionality, more expansive than their corresponding dialects, they display a tendency toward standardised norms, which entails a significant enlargement of the lexicon and a more systematised, codified grammar, often by way of foreign borrowings, and recourse to a previous literary and linguistic tradition alien to vernacular dialects. In contrast to a dialect exploited for artistic purposes, every minor literary Slavic language is to a greater or lesser degree governed by an organised literary and linguistic process that provides for the establishment and development of a literary microlanguage, and which presents it as such.

In terms of location, Slavic microlanguages exist in both predominantly Slavic and non-Slavic areas, earning some the designation of linguistic "islands" resulting from a past migration, whereas others exist indigenously, having never been entirely separated from their genetic and geographic points of origin.

== Ethnic factor ==
The majority of Slavic microlanguages are not represented by nations, but rather the cultural-linguistic and ethno-linguistic groups which are in turn branches of larger Slavic ethnic groups or nations.

Peripheral literary microlanguages function in the environment of cultural and linguistic groups that exist within the peripheral (ethnic) area and are distinguished within its framework only by local features of culture-historical and linguistic (dialectal) nature – such are Chakavians, Kajkavians in Croatia.

Insular ethno-linguistic groups — represented by the "islands" of national minorities — correspond with the insular literary microlanguages — such are the Burgenland Croats, Molise Croats, Banat Bulgarians; unlike cultural-linguistic groups, these are more distinct in terms of ethnicity and language. Both peripheral and insular branches consider themselves to be an inseparable part of the corresponding Slavic ethnic nation: the Banat Bulgarians see themselves as part of the Bulgarian ethnic group, the Chakavians and the Kajkavians, as well as the Burgenland Croats and the Molise Croats — as part the Croat ethnic group. Pannonian Rusyn can be considered an independent Slavic language instead of a literary microlanguage, since it is used by an ethnic group, recognised by some to be a distinct nationality. There is a number of other cases where the border between microlanguages and independent Slavic languages may be indistinct: for example, the "insular" Sorbian, spoken by the Slavic national minority in Germany, and the "peripheral" Kashubian in Poland are both generally considered to be separate languages by the Russian linguists.

== Origin and history of Slavic microlanguages ==
Conditions necessary for the emergence of literary microlanguages include: compactly populated area of speakers and the resulting isolation from the main dialect continuum; awareness of linguistic and ethnic distinctiveness; complexity of the dialectal environment, which prompts speakers to introduce their own literary language (especially during the formation of national literary languages) on the basis of a close group of dialects; pre-existing literary tradition in a related or unrelated language, which could provide ground for experiments in using the native language as a literary standard. The number of speakers alone does not guarantee the emergence of a literary standard, although it influences the potential outcome of the literary language formation process. Historical factors stimulating the emergence of a number of Slavic microlanguages has been Protestantism (in the 16th century), the Slavic national revival movements (19th century), and subjective factors such as prominent enlightenment figures giving an impetus to the development of the emerging literary standard based on their dialect, mainly by the power of their literary works.

It is noteworthy that almost all peripheral literary microlanguages at the initial stage of their development (that it, before the period of national revival) were regional varieties that competed to become the basis of the emerging national literary language.

== Criticism ==
Theory of “Slavic microlinguistics” is critically assessed by the Russian Slavic scholar Sergey Skorvid, who believes that due to the vague and ambiguous definition of the term “Slavic microlanguages”, a number of researchers, including Aleksandr Dulichenko himself, have assigned different meanings to the concept of Slavic microlanguages. The use of this term, according to Skorvid, is inappropriate, since it can refer to completely dissimilar language varieties. All Slavic idioms of limited use can be more clearly defined by other terms. For instance, the Sorbian languages (Upper and Lower Sorbian) in Germany, Pannonian Rusyn in Serbia and Croatia, Carpathian Rusyn in Slovakia, Lemko in Poland and some other idioms should rather be classified as minority languages. Kashubian in Poland, Carpathian Rusyn in Ukraine, Kajkavian and Chakavian in Croatia, as well as other similar idioms, whose speakers have a distinct regional ethno-linguistic identity, should rather be considered regional languages. Written languages such as Podlachian, used by Jan Maksymiuk, Masurian in Poland or the already defunct Lachian, used by Czech poet Óndra Łysohorsky, and West Polesian promoted by Nikolai Shelyagovich in Belarus, can be classified as "literary idiolects" and "literary dialects".

Czech researcher Vladislav Knoll points out to “the lack of a strict definition of the key terms in the literary microlanguage theory". This, in his opinion, gives ground to refer to an increasing number of Slavic idioms of both the present and the past as Slavic microlanguages, which has recently become a trend. In particular, modern varieties such as Podhalian, Masurian, Silesian and Moravian, as well as historical languages such as Biblical Czech, Bernolákova Slovak, Trnava Slovak, Camaldolese Slovak and Transylvanian Bulgarian have all been labeled "new microlanguages". Most of the linguistic varieties that Aleksandr Dulichenko groups as "microlanguages", are classified as "literary dialects" by Vladislav Knoll. In Knoll's opinion, it is necessary to separate the group of literary idiolects, such as the project of the Lachian language and the group of regional literary languages, such as Molise Croatian and Pannonian Rusyn, and, possibly, Kashubian and Slovak Rusyn.

== See also ==
- Dialect or language
- Balachka
- Surzhyk
- Trasianka
- Russian dialects

== Bibliography ==
- Dulichenko A.D. Malyje slavianskije literaturnyje jazyki (mikrojazyki) // Jazyki Mira: Slavianskije Jazyki. М.: Academia, 2005
- Dulichenko A.D. Slavianskije literaturnyje mikrojazyki. Voprosy formirovanija i rasvitija. Tallinn, 1981.
- Dulichenko A.D. Jazyki malyh etničeskih grupp: funkcionaljnyj status i problemy razvitija slovaria (na slavianskom materïale) // Modernisierung des Wortschatzes europäischer Regional- und Minderheitensprachen. Tübingen, 1999.
- Dulichenko A.D. Kleinschriftsprachen in der slawischen Sprachenwelt // Zeitschrift für Slawistik, 1994, Bd. 39.
- Dulichenko A.D. (2018). Александра Д. Дуличенко и Motoki Nomachi (ed.). Славянская микрофилология (PDF) (Славянская микрофилология (Slavica Tartuensia XI (Tartu Ülikool / Тартуский университет) — Slavic Eurasian Studies № 34) ed.). Sapporo, Tartu: Slavic-Eurasian Research Center, Hokkaido University; Slaavi Filoloogia Osakond, Tartu Ülikool. pp. 3–19. ISBN 978-4-938637-94-1.
