= Polesie (association) =

Public-cultural association in Belarus

Polesie Полісьсе
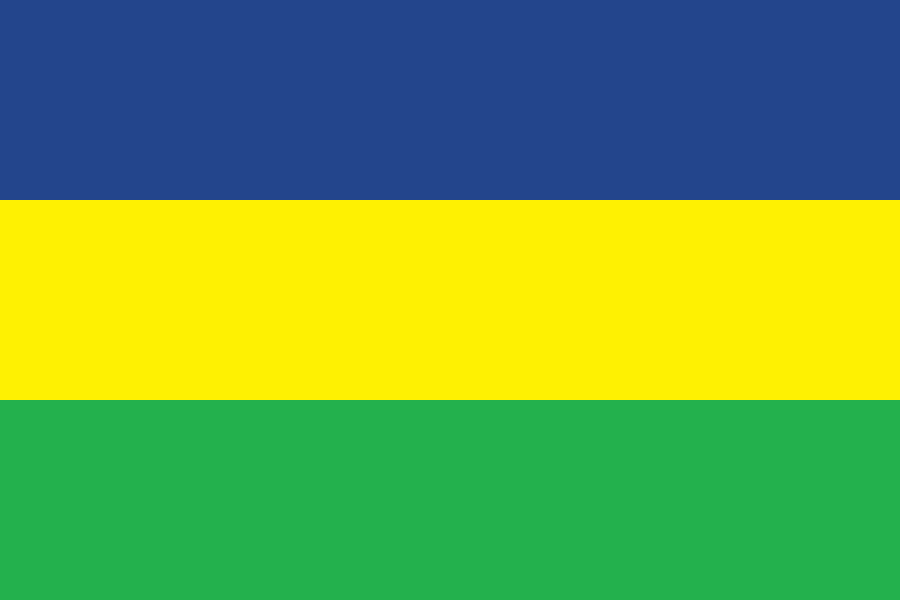
- President: Viktor Davydjuk
- Chairperson: Nikolai Shelyagovich
- Founder: Nikolai Shelyagovich
- Founded: April 14, 1988
- Dissolved: 1995
- Newspaper: "Balesy Polіssya" ("Voices of Polesia") (1988-1989) "Zbudіnne" ("Awakening")(1990-1995)
- Membership (1990): ~600
- Ideology: Revival of the West Polesian language Poleshuk minority interests 1988–1994: Western Polesie Autonomy (Factions) 1994–1995: Western Polesie Autonomy (Officially); Pan-slavism

The Polesie (Note: Belarusian: Палессе, romanized: Paliessie; Ukrainian: Полісся, romanized: Polissia; Shelyagovich's Yotvingian: Полісьсе, romanized: Polissia) was a Poleshuk cultural association and later an autonomy movement for the Western Polesie region. It was active primarily in Belarus, with limited presence in Ukraine.

== History ==
=== Polesie Cultural Union ===
In April 1988, Nikolai Shelyagovich, together with 17 colleagues, founded the social and cultural association "Polesie" (Полісьсе) on the Belarusian Culture Fund in Minsk. Its goals were the revival of the Western Polesian language, and recognition of the local residents of as a national minority, with some further supporting national and cultural autonomy or even independence of Western Polesie. The movement was also sometimes referred to as the "Young Yotvingian" movement, with its members being called "Young Yotvingians" (Belarusian: Младаятвягаў), while the Poleshuks who chose not to join the association and continued living by Belarusian traditions were referred to as "Old Yotvingians." (Belarusian: Стараятвягаў).

From 1988 to 1989, the association published its newspaper "Balesy Polіssya" ("Voices of Polesia"), written in cyrillic Polesian, which covered philological topics, as well as the movement's manifesto and political opinions. "Balesy Polіssya" was later replaced by the more politically-oriented "Zbudіnne" ("Awakening"), written in both romanized and the standard cyrillic Polesian, but also occasionally written in Belarusian, Russian as well, with 85 issues being published between 1990 and 1995. These publications drew attention of the Belarusian intelligentsia, and regular citizens, as besides the historical Polesian concept, they also reflected various aspects of modern life of the Polesians. "Zbudіnne" specifically drew the attention of the residents of Minsk, because of the classified political documents reportedly published by Shelyagovich.

=== Reactions ===
The organization caused great interest among the intelligentsia of Minsk and Brest, attracting many well-known scholars, researchers, philologists, historians, writers and poets. The movement also collaborated with Ukrainian West Polesians; Ukrainian poets and professors sometimes appeared as editorial members of the "Zbudіnne" newspaper. According to Viktor Davydjuk, a Lutsk-based ethnologist, folklorist and the first acting president of Polesie, there were no more than 20 colleagues in Ukraine who were interested in the movement at that time, though not all of them became members.

Some Belarusian public figures and writers, such as Nil Gilevich, Oleg Trusov and Zianon Pazniak, opposed Polesie, regarding the movement as a threat to the territorial and national integrity of Belarus. Some even suspected the movement of being a provocation by the KGB, akin to the creation of Transnistria. In 1993, Our Word published an article claiming that “imperial forces in the former USSR” sought to incite ethnic hostility in newly independent states and use groups like Polesie to destabilize Belarus. According to the article, in the event of a national-democratic victory in Belarus, the movement’s leaders, particularly Shelyagovich, would serve merely as a temporary façade for a Bolshevik-backed coup in the western Polesie region. Scholars P. F. Lysenko and V. A. Poluyan published an open letter in People’s Newspaper and Zarya in 1992. The letter cited statements in the newspaper Zbudinnya, whose authors speculated about various options for the political future of Polesie, including autonomy within Belarus or Ukraine, or even independence. Lysenko and Poluyan emphasized what they saw as the Ukrainian influence on the movement, pointing to proposals for cooperation with the People's Movement of Ukraine and calls for the region to join a “Western Ukrainian state.” Historian G. Grechishkin expressed a similar view in Pinsky Vestnik, arguing that autonomy or statehood for western Polesie was unrealistic, saying that union with Ukraine was the only logical outcome for the movement.

According to the sociological study of interethnic relations in the Belarusian border area based on materials from the Malaryta, Ivanava, Kobryn, and Pinsk districts, done by Engels Konstantinovich Doroshevich, It was noted that 81.8% of the total number of respondents did not advocate for any autonomy and considered themselves Belarusians. 61.7% considered it inappropriate to allocate Western Polesie into an independent cultural and linguistic region in the Republic of Belarus, 7.3% supported the idea of autonomy. The survey also indicated a confrontation between pro-Ukrainian and pro-Autonomy Poleshchuks in the Kobryn District. On January 20, 1993, it was concluded that "the problem of a separate Polesie ethnicity is not present in the national ethnic consciousness."

=== Decline ===
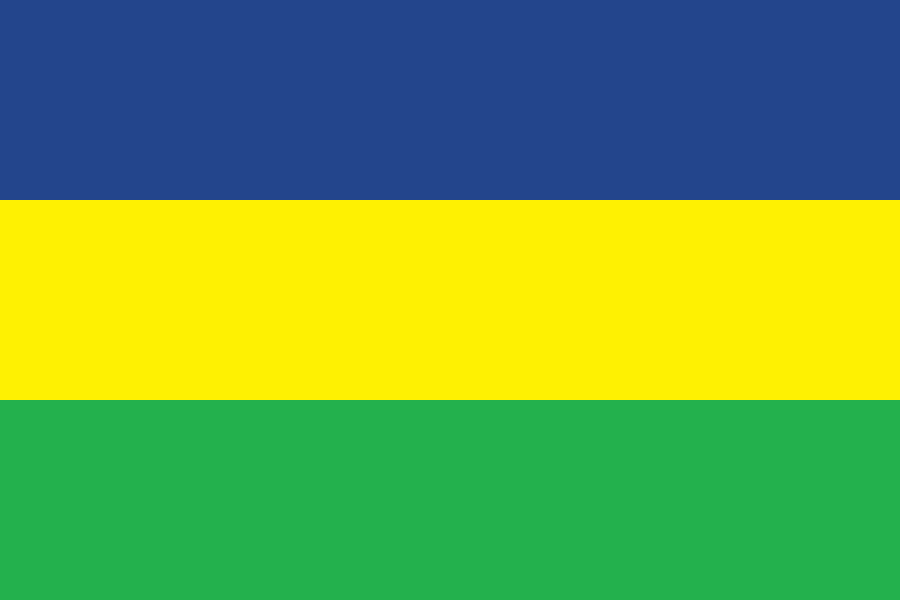
Flag of the "Young Yotvingians" by 1994

With the referendum in 1995, and the changing political situation in Belarus, the movement's popularity gradually tapered off, before officially dissolving the same year. Shelyagovich would later move to Kaliningrad due to financial problems, where he established a regional social organization Jetvyz’ in 2010.

While Aleksander Lukashenko initially spoke in support of Polesie during a meeting of the Supreme Council of Belarus, he would later oppose it, subsequently claiming that Polesian separatism (headed by the association) ended following his early presidential visit of the Pripyat floodplain in the 1990s and the subsequent aid given to the Polesie region.

== Ideology ==
Map of the Yotvingian Ethnolinguistic area defined on the Western Polesia scholarly conference In April 1990.

The group claimed that the Poleshuks are direct descendants of the Baltic tribe of Yotvingians, emphasizing a significant cultural distance between the residents of the western regions of the Brest region and other regions of Belarus. Its official goals were the revival of the Western Polesie language, recognition of the local residents of as a national minority, with some factions further supporting national and cultural autonomy of the West Polesie region. On April 13–14, 1990, a scholarly conference, attended by 74 people of different scholarly backgrounds, regardless of their membership in Polesie, was held in Minsk. The group declared the territories of the Brest and Pinsk regions of Belarus, the Volhynia region of Ukraine, and the Podlachia and Chełm regions of Poland to be a part of the Yotvingian ethnic area, and discussed, among others, issues regarding the West Polesian culture and standardization of the West Polesian language, that were later proposed to the Belarusian Supreme Council.

In June of 1991, the group considered a proposal to more actively promote the development of the culture of the Polesie region of Belarus. Shelyagovich proposed adopting a law on the Western Polesie ethnic group, and the creation a Western Polesie cultural and educational center. The deputies made the decision to support and approve the desire of the members to study the folk culture, folklore, dialect of the Polesie region, but considered the creation of any autonomies, scientific centers as inappropriate, as, according to them, the residents of Belarusian Polesie were an original part of the Belarusian people.

In the last years of its activity (1993–1995), the association supported cooperation with Russia within the framework of Pan-Slavic development, opposing Belarusian nationalism. Shelyagovich would participate as a candidate in the 1994 Belarusian presidential election, declaring that West Polesia should be autonomous, and a federal subject within a Belarusian Federation, consisting of It and the rest of Belarus.

== See also ==
- Litvinism
