= Paul Hollander =

20th-Century Hungarian-American, Anti-Communist academic and writer

- Born: October 3, 1932; Budapest, Hungary
- Died: April 9, 2019 (aged 86)

Paul Hollander (/ˈhɒləndər/; 3 October 1932 – 9 April 2019) was a Hungarian-born political sociologist, communist-studies scholar, and non-fiction author. He is known for his criticisms of communism and left-wing politics in general.

== Background ==
Born in 1932 in Budapest, he lived in Hungary with his Jewish family. When the Nazis persecuted Jews throughout the city, he had to hide from them when he was 12. His family was deported to work, after the communists came to power.

He fled to the West during the Hungarian Revolution of 1956, which was bloodily put down by Soviet forces. First he escaped to Austria and then to England.

== Career ==
Hollander earned a Ph.D. in Sociology from Princeton University, 1963 and a B.A. from the London School of Economics, 1959. He was Professor of Sociology at the University of Massachusetts Amherst and a Center Associate of the Davis Center for Russian and Eurasian Studies at Harvard University.

The anti-communist scholar wrote many books and articles. He is best known for his works Political Pilgrims: Western Intellectuals In Search of the Good Society, published in 1981, and Anti-Americanism, published in 1992.

He was a member of the national advisory council of the Victims of Communism Memorial Foundation. Before his death, he compared Donald Trump with the dictators Benito Mussolini, Adolf Hitler, Joseph Stalin and Mao Zedong.

== Works ==
External videos
- Booknotes interview with Hollander on Anti-Americanism: Critiques at Home and Abroad and Decline and Discontent, April 19, 1992, C-SPAN
- Presentation by Hollander on From the Gulag to the Killing Fields, June 28, 2006, C-SPAN
- Presentation by Hollander on From Benito Mussolini to Hugo Chavez, September 13, 2017, C-SPAN

Books Authored

- Hollander, Paul (1973). Soviet and American society : a comparison.
- Political Pilgrims (1981)
- The Many Faces of Socialism (1983)
- The Survival of the Adversary Culture (1988)
- Decline and Discontent: Communism and the West Today (1992)
- Anti-Americanism: Critiques at Home and Abroad (1992)
- Political Will and Personal Belief: The Decline and Fall of Soviet Communism (1999)
- Discontents: Postmodern and Postcommunist (2002)
- The End of Commitment: Intellectuals, Revolutionaries, and Political Morality in the Twentieth Century (2006)
- The Only Superpower: Reflections on Strength, Weakness, and Anti-Americanism (2009)
- Extravagant Expectations: New Ways To Find Romantic Love In America (2011)
- From Benito Mussolini to Hugo Chávez: Intellectuals and a Century of Political Hero Worship (2016)

Books Edited

- American and Soviet Society (1969)
- Understanding Anti-Americanism (2004)
- From the Gulag to the Killing Fields (2006)
- Political Violence: Belief, Behavior and Legitimation (2008)

Articles

- Hollander, Paul (October 1995). "Digesting the collapse of communism : responses of Western intellectuals". Quadrant. 39 (10): 64–70.
