= Bosna franciscana =

- Discipline: Franciscan studies
- Language: English
- Edited by: Marko Karamatić

Publication details
- History: 1993-present
- Publisher: Franciscan Theology Sarajevo (Bosnia)
- Frequency: Semiannual

Standard abbreviations
- ISO 4: Bosna francisc.

Indexing
- ISSN: 1330-7487

Links
- Journal homepage

Bosna franciscana: časopis Franjevačke teologije Sarajevo is an semiannual academic journal edited and managed by Franciscan Theology Sarajevo. Its focus is on the Franciscans in Bosnia and Herzegovina, in addition to theology, philosophy, literary history, general culture and the arts. The journal was and continues to be a print journal.

== History ==
Bosna franciscana was established in 1993 while the school was based in Samobor because of the War in Bosnia. The first 6 issues were published in Samobor. After the return of Franciscan Theology to Sarajevo in 1997, the journal has been published twice a year there. Its foundation was inspired by the appearance of large changes in the world, and Europe in particular.

== Selected works ==
- Kolar Janković, Tanja (2007-05-28). "'Bosna franciscana', časopis Franjevačke teologije, broj 23, godina XIII, Sarajevo 2005, 307 str" [Review of Bosna franciscana XII, 23]. Povijesni zbornik (in Serbo-Croatian). 1 (1–2): 319–320. eISSN 1849-0956.
- Kolar Janković, Tanja (2007-05-28). "'Bosna franciscana', časopis Franjevačke teologije, br. 24, god. XIV, Sarajevo, 2006, 253 str" [Review of Bosna franciscana XVI, 24]. Povijesni zbornik (in Serbo-Croatian). 1 (1–2): 321–322. eISSN 1849-0956.
- Skuhala Karasman, Ivana (2008). "'Bosna franciscana', časopis Franjevačke teologije, Sarajevo, godina XV, broj 26, 2007, 359 str" [Review of Bosna franciscana XV, 26]. Prilozi za istraživanje hrvatske filozofske baštine (in Serbo-Croatian). 34 (1–2): 324–327. eISSN 1847-4489.
- Brandić, Marija (2013-07-08). "'Bosna franciscana', časopis Franjevačke teologije, br. 27., god. XV., 2007" [Review of Bosna franciscana XV, 27]. Povijesni zbornik (in Serbo-Croatian). 3 (4): 319–321. eISSN 1849-0956.
- Brandić, Marija (2013-07-08). "'Bosna franciscana', časopis Franjevačke teologije, br. 28., god. XVI., 2008" [Review of Bosna franciscana XVI, 28]. Povijesni zbornik (in Serbo-Croatian). 3 (4): 323–325. eISSN 1849-0956.
- Skuhala Karasman, Ivana (2010-12-26). "'Bosna franciscana', časopis Franjevačke teologije, Sarajevo, XVII, 30, 2009, 343 str" [Review of Bosna franciscana XVII, 30]. Prilozi za istraživanje hrvatske filozofske baštine (in Serbo-Croatian). 36 (1–2): 191–194. eISSN 1847-4489.

== See also ==
- List of Slavic studies journals

== Bibliography ==
- "Bosna Franciscana: Journal Detail". Central and Eastern European Online Library. 2018. Archived from the original on 2018-04-29.
- FTS (2018). "Časopisi: Periodične publikacije Franjevačke teologije Sarajevo" [Journals: Periodical Publications of Franciscan Theology Sarajevo]. Franjevačka teologija Sarajevo (in Serbo-Croatian).
- FPBS (2025). "Karamatić, Marko". Franjevačka provincija Sv. Križa - Bosna Srebrena. Archived from the original on 2025-06-10.
