= Motolian dialect =

Dialect of West Polesian

Motolian
- Native to: Belarus
- Language family: Indo-European: Balto-Slavic; Slavic; East Slavic; West Polesian; Motolian
- Writing system: Cyrillic script

Language codes
- ISO 639-3: –
- Glottolog: None

Motolian (Мотольска, Motolska) is a West Polesian dialect spoken in the village of Motol, Belarus.
