= Nikola Milev =

Bulgarian diplomat and historian (1881–1925)

Professor Nikola Milev
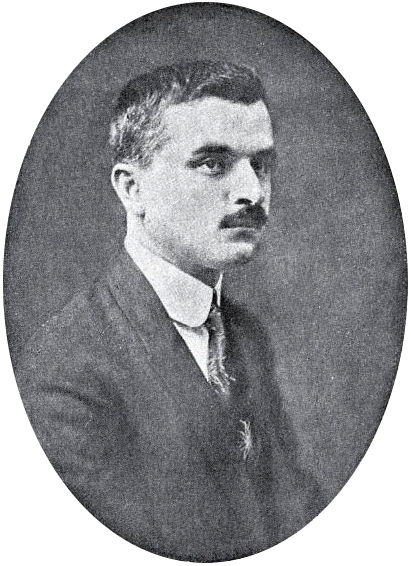
- Born: 8 May 1881; Mokreni, Ottoman Empire
- Died: 13 February 1925 (aged 43); Sofia, Bulgaria

Professor Nikola Iliev Milev (Bulgarian: Никола Илиев Милев) (May 8, 1881 – February 13, 1925) was a Bulgarian historian, publicist, public figure, diplomat, and a participant in the Macedonian revolutionary movement.

== Biography ==
Milev was born in Mokreni (today Variko, Florina regional unit, Greece), a Bulgarian-populated village in Macedonia, then in the Ottoman Empire. He finished the Bulgarian primary school in his birthplace and went with his father to Cairo, Egypt, where he lived for a period. He continued his education in Galatasaray High School in Istanbul. In 1902, he was a teacher in Istanbul and worked for Simeon Radev's newspaper Evening Mail. He then studied at the Sofia University, from where he graduated in history (1903–1909). With the recommendations of Professor Vasil Zlatarski and with a Marin Drinov scholarship, Milev specialized history in Vienna, Florence and Rome from 1910 to 1912.

During the Balkan Wars, Milev was an interpreter at the headquarters of the Second Bulgarian Army. After the Balkan Wars, he became an associate professor at the Department of Bulgarian History and History of the Balkan Nations at Sofia University (1915–1922).

In 1918 Milev, became director of the press at the Bulgarian Ministry of Foreign Affairs. He was among the founders of the political party People's Accord (Naroden sgovor) in 1921. In 1922, he worked as the head of the daily newspaper Slovo ("Speech"). As President of the Association of the Journalists in Sofia, he protected the freedom of speech and press and, as grandmaster of the Zora freemason's lodge, he advocated for the cause of the Macedonian Bulgarians and an autonomous Macedonia. Regardless of his negative attitude towards the policy of the Bulgarian Premier Aleksandar Stamboliyski, Milev was included in the Bulgarian delegation at the Conference of Lausanne in 1922. After the assassination of Aleksandar Grekov by anarchists in 1922, Nikola Milev became the director of the daily newspaper Slovo.

Nikola Milev was considered among the potential foreign ministers of the new government after the Bulgarian coup d'état of 1923, but was rejected for of fear of the reaction of the State of Slovenes, Croats and Serbs and Greece. He was member of Bulgarian parliament in 1923–1925 and served as adviser to the Bulgarian representation in the League of Nations in Geneva.

In 1925 Milev was selected as the representative of Bulgaria in the United States, but was killed days before his departure. The decision to kill Milev was taken by a group of Macedonian figures around Dimitar Vlahov. It is believed that Milev was one of the main ideological opponents to the Comintern and its supporters in the Macedonian movement. The decision to murder Milev was approved by Stanke Dimitrov and the Central Committee of the Bulgarian Communist Party.

Milev's funeral on 15 February 1925 was one of the most crowded in Sofia in those years. His murder increased tension in the Bulgarian society in this period. The actual killer was captured by Macedonian workers, and after his confession was killed by the Internal Macedonian Revolutionary Organization (IMRO), but instead of the actual instigators, their supporters deputies Todor Strashimirov and Haralampi Stoyanov were killed.

=== Milev in the Macedonian movement ===
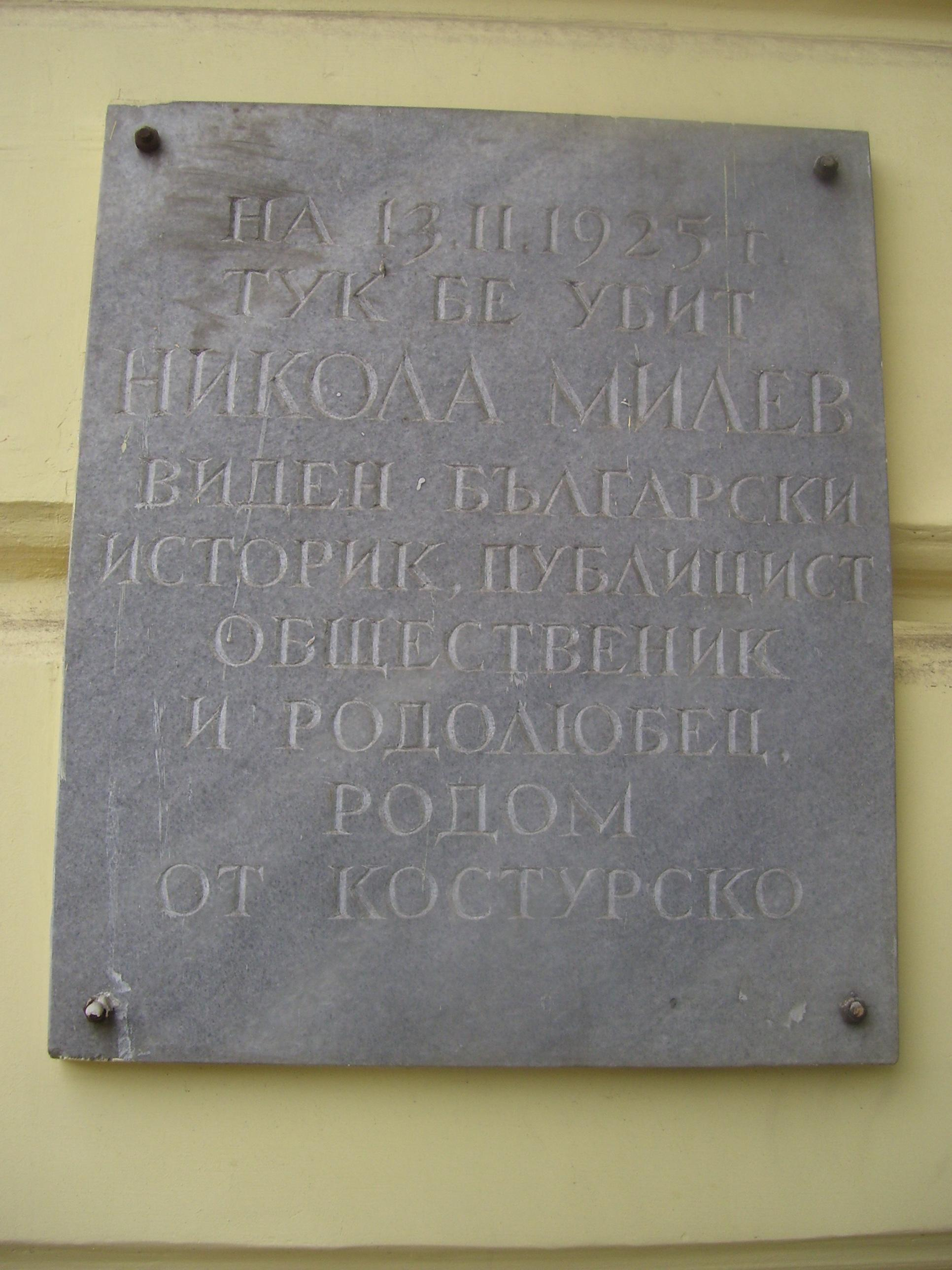
Memorial plaque at Milev's place of assassination in Sofia

Nikola Milev joined IMORO as a student in 1898, but more actively joined the activities of the organizations of Macedonian Bulgarians after 1919. He participated in the activities of the Macedonian brotherhood in Sofia and cooperated with the periodicals of the Macedonian Bulgarians. Although he wasn't an IMRO member after World War I, along with the professors Lyubomir Miletich and Ivan Georgov Nikola Milev was advisor to the leader of IMRO Todor Aleksandrov. Milev was one of the opponents of the communist attempts to take control over Macedonian organizations.

Nikola Milev was one of the moral and intellectual leaders of the refugees from Macedonia. Ivan Mihailov describes him thus:

"He possessed a combination of humility and firm conviction. His all person and especially his speech exhales an angelic warmth and security. He spoke simply and cordially. And all that he said was in due measure. He won with by means of his tact, amazed with his mind, conquered through his modesty... He had a chosen place among the elite of Bulgarian intellectuals that was difficult to fill again.”

Nikola Milev became one of the founders of the Macedonian Scientific Institute in 1923 and was elected to its first Board of Directors.

== Scholarly work ==
Nikola Milev's research covers various periods of the historical development of the Bulgarian people: from the 7th century until the time of the Bulgarian Revival. He published his first studies in the scientific journals Periodical Journal, Proceedings of the Bulgarian Historical Society and others. The most famous of his works are those dealing with the Catholic propaganda in Bulgaria during the Ottoman period and the Catholic Bulgarians. His monography of 1914 Catholic Propaganda in Bulgaria in the 18th Century is highly appreciated and it paved the way to his career of a university professor. This book has been defined as "brilliant" in the Bulgarian historiography.

In the period 1914–1923 Nikola Milev was a free associate professor of history at Sofia University, and from 1923 on was a professor.

In 1923 Nikola Milev became one of the founders of the Macedonian Scientific Institute and was elected to his first Board of Directors.

== Works ==
- "Лични Спомени; Бележки в навечерието на 9 юний", short memoirs written by Nikola Milev in 1923 and published in the "Вестник на вестниците" newspaper after his death in 1925.
