= Nikola Andreev (Kostur voyvoda) =

Voivode Nikola Andreev
- Никола Андреев
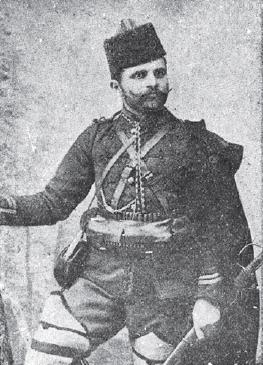
- Nikola Andreev c. early 1900s
- Born: c. 1879; Mokreni, Monastir Vilayet, Ottoman Empire (now Variko, Greece)
- Died: August 1911; Mokreni, Monastir Vilayet, Ottoman Empire (now Variko, Greece)
- Education: Sofia Military Academy
- Military career
- Allegiance: IMRO
- Nickname: Alay Bey
- Conflicts: Macedonian Struggle; Ilinden Uprising; Capture of Klisura

Nikola Andreev (1879–1911), known as Alay Bey, was a Bulgarian Army officer and revolutionary of the Internal Macedonian-Adrianople Revolutionary Organization (IMARO). He was the leader of a revolutionary band in the Kostur region and a participant in the Ilinden-Preobrazhenie Uprising.

Nikola Andreev was born in 1879 in the village of Mokreni, then part of the Ottoman Empire. After he finished the fifth grade of the Gymnasium in Varna, he studied for a while in the Military School in Sofia.

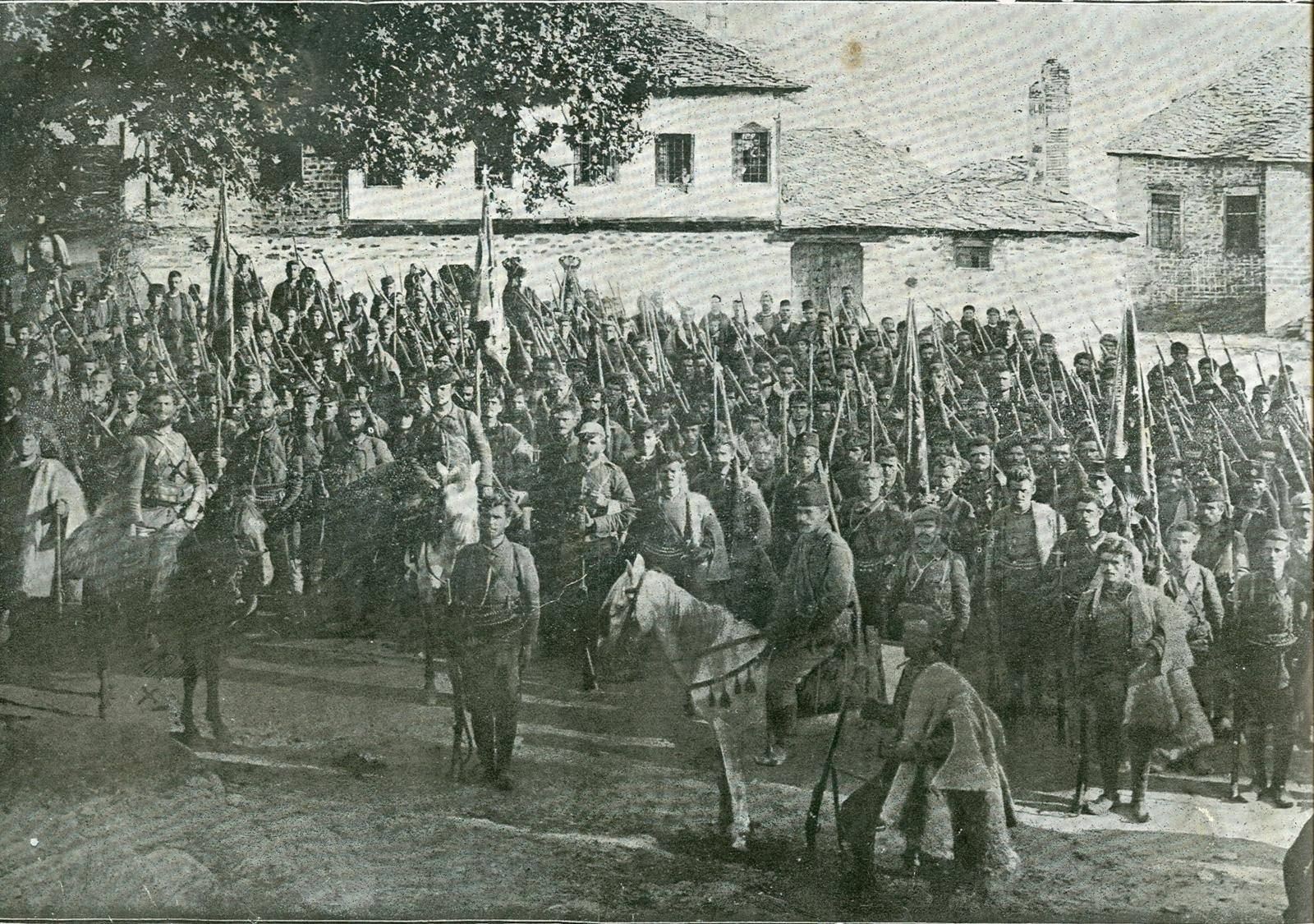
The united Kostur bands of voyvodas Vasil Chekalarov, Ivan Popov, Pando Klyashev, Nikola Andreev and Manol Rizov after the capture of Klisura.

He left the military school and was attracted to the IMARO by Lazar Poptraykov and Toma Davidov. He was shortly a freedom fighter in the revolutionary band of Marko Lerinski during 1902. He was a recruiter in the region of Kostur and then became a leader of a revolutionary band himself.

At the beginning of the Ilinden-Preobrazhenie Uprising, he didn't manage to take over Klisura on his own, but later with the help of Pando Klyashev, Pando Sidov, Vasil Chekalarov, Manol Rozov and Marko Ivanov took over the towns of Klisura and Neveska.

After the uprising, until the Young Turk Revolution, he was a leader in the regions of Kostur and Kaylyari. Then he worked as a teacher in his village.

In 1911, Nikola Andreev was killed by one of his friends because of jealousy.
