= List of Russian studies centers =

The following is a list of academic research centers devoted to Russian studies, or Slavic studies, encompassing the area of the former Soviet Union, sometimes referred to as Eurasia:

1. Arizona State University - The Melikian Center: Russian, Eurasian and East European Studies
2. Carleton University - Institute of European, Russian, and Eurasian Studies
3. Columbia University - Harriman Institute for Russian, Eurasian and East European Studies
4. Dalian University of Foreign Languages - The Center for Russian Studies
5. Georgetown University - Center for Eurasian, Russian, and East European Studies
6. Harvard University - Davis Center for Russian and Eurasian studies (formerly Russian Research Center)
7. Hokkaido University - Slavic-Eurasian Research Center
8. Indiana University - Inner Asian and Uralic National Resource Center
9. Indiana University Bloomington - Robert F. Byrnes Russian and East European Institute
10. Ohio State University - Center for Slavic and East European Studies
11. Stanford University - Center for Russian, East European and Eurasian Studies
12. University of California, Berkeley - Institute of Slavic, East European, and Eurasian Studies
13. University of California, Los Angeles - Center for European and Eurasian Studies
14. University of Chicago - Center for East European and Russian/Eurasian Studies
15. University of Illinois at Urbana–Champaign - Russian, East European, and Eurasian Center
16. University of Kansas - Center for Russian, East European and Eurasian Studies
17. University of Michigan - Center for Russian and East European Studies
18. University of Pittsburgh - Center for Russian, East European, and Eurasian Studies
19. University of Toronto - Centre for European, Russian, and Eurasian Studies
20. University of Texas, Austin - Center for Russian, East European and Eurasian Studies
21. University of Virginia - Center for Russian, East European, and Eurasian Studies (CREEES)
22. University of Washington - Ellison Center for Russian, East European and Central Asian Studies
23. University of Wisconsin–Madison - Center for Russia, East Europe and Central Asia
24. University of North Carolina-Chapel Hill - Center for Slavic, Eurasian and East European Studies
25. George Washington University - Institute for European, Russian, and Eurasian Studies
26. New Era University - Russian Studies Center

== See also ==
- Bibliography of Russian history
- Bibliography of the Soviet Union (disambiguation)
- Kremlinology
- List of libraries in Russia
- List of Slavic studies journals
- Russian culture
- Russian language
- Slavic studies
