= Variko =

Variko Βαρικό
- Municipal unit
- Variko

- Location within the regional unit

- Location within Greece
- Coordinates: 40°32.30′N 21°30′E
- Country: Greece
- Administrative region: West Macedonia
- Regional unit: Florina
- Municipality: Amyntaio

Area
  - Municipal unit: 21.9 km^{2} (8.5 sq mi)
- Elevation: 770 m (2,530 ft)

Population (2021)
  - Municipal unit: 508
  - Municipal unit density: 23.2/km^{2} (60.1/sq mi)
- Time zone: UTC+2 (EET)
  - Summer (DST): UTC+3 (EEST)
- Postal code: 500 05

Variko (Greek: Βαρικό, before 1926: Μόκραινα – Mokraina; Bulgarian/Macedonian: Мокрени) is a village and a former community in Florina regional unit, West Macedonia, Greece. Since the 2011 local government reform it is part of the municipality Amyntaio, of which it is a municipal unit. The municipal unit has an area of 21.877 km^{2}. It is 27 km south-southeast of the city of Florina. The village's primary agricultural products are beans, corn, and wheat. There is an annual bean festival on August 15, coinciding with the Dormition of Virgin.

== History ==
The village was first mentioned in an Ottoman defter of 1481, under the name of Mokreni, and was described as having sixty-nine households. In the beginning of 19th century Francois Pouqueville noted Mocrena as one of the Bulgarian villages in the region. The population of Mocreni was Bulgarian in 19th and early 20th centuries. The population of the village was under the supremacy of the Bulgarian Exarchate since 1891.

The village was burned by the Ottomans during the Ilinden Uprising. There was a Bulgarian school in the village in the beginning of the 20th century. After the Treaty of Bucharest in 1913, when the area became part of Greece, many people emigrated to Bulgaria. The village was renamed Variko in 1926.

After the defeat of Greece by Nazi Germany in April 1941 in the village was formed a club of the Bulgaro-Macedonian Central Committee and in 1943 a detachment of the Bulgarian paramilitary organization Ohrana. The village suffered greatly during the Greek Civil War, when many villagers emigrated abroad.

== Notable persons ==
- Nikola Andreev, (1879 - 1911) - Bulgarian teacher and voivode
- Nikola Milev, (1881-1925) - Bulgarian historian

== Demographics ==
According to the 2021 census, the population of Variko was 508 people. Today, the village has a mixed population of Greeks and Slav Macedonians (around 11,7%).

== Literature ==
- "Мокрени (моето родно село)" A book by Anastas Simeonov, the son of the revolutionary Simeon Krstev Siin, about the history of Mokreni (his home village) - In Bulgarian. 1931
