= Slavic languages =

Subfamily of Indo-European languages

Slavic
- Slavonic
- Geographic distribution: Throughout Central Europe, Eastern Europe, and Southeast Europe, plus Central Asia and North Asia (Siberia)
- Ethnicity: Slavs
- Native speakers: (c. 315 million cited 2001)
- Linguistic classification: Indo-European: Balto-Slavic; Slavic
- Proto-language: Proto-Slavic
- Subdivisions: East Slavic; South Slavic; West Slavic

Language codes
- ISO 639-2 / 5: sla
- Glottolog: slav1255
- Linguasphere: 53
- Political map of Europe with countries where a Slavic language is a national language East Slavic languages South Slavic languages West Slavic languages

The Slavic languages, also known as the Slavonic languages, are Indo-European languages spoken primarily by the Slavic peoples and their descendants. They are thought to descend from a proto-language called Proto-Slavic, spoken during the Early Middle Ages, which in turn is thought to have descended from the earlier Proto-Balto-Slavic language, linking the Slavic languages to the Baltic languages in a Balto-Slavic group within the Indo-European family.

The current geographical distribution of natively spoken Slavic languages includes the Balkans, Central and Eastern Europe, and all the way from Western Siberia to the Russian Far East. Furthermore, the diasporas of many Slavic peoples have established isolated minorities of speakers of their languages all over the world. The number of speakers of all Slavic languages together was estimated to be 315 million at the turn of the twenty-first century. It is the largest ethno-linguistic group in Europe and is highly diverse.

The Slavic languages are conventionally (that is, also on the basis of extralinguistic features, such as geography) divided into three subgroups: East, South, and West, which together constitute more than 20 languages. Of these, 10 have at least one million speakers and official status as the national languages of the countries in which they are predominantly spoken: Russian, Belarusian and Ukrainian (of the East group), Polish, Czech and Slovak (of the West group), Bulgarian and Macedonian (eastern members of the South group), and Serbo-Croatian (Note: A pluricentric language with four mutually intelligible standard varieties: Bosnian, Croatian, Montenegrin and Serbian.) and Slovene (western members of the South group). In addition, Aleksandr Dulichenko recognizes a number of Slavic microlanguages: both isolated ethnolects and peripheral dialects of more well-established Slavic languages.

Most Slavic languages are highly inflectional. Nouns usually decline for case, gender, and number; verbs could conjugate for person, gender, tense, aspect, etc. Slavic languages generally have three grammatical genders — masculine, feminine, and neuter. For animals, the masculine and feminine genders roughly correspond to biological genders; nouns referring to humans are almost never neuter. Most modern Slavic languages have two numbers — singular and plural, with some inheriting an old dual number. A minority of Slavic languages decline nouns for definiteness.

Slavic languages typically have flexible word order. The unmarked word order is usually subject–verb–object.

== Branches ==
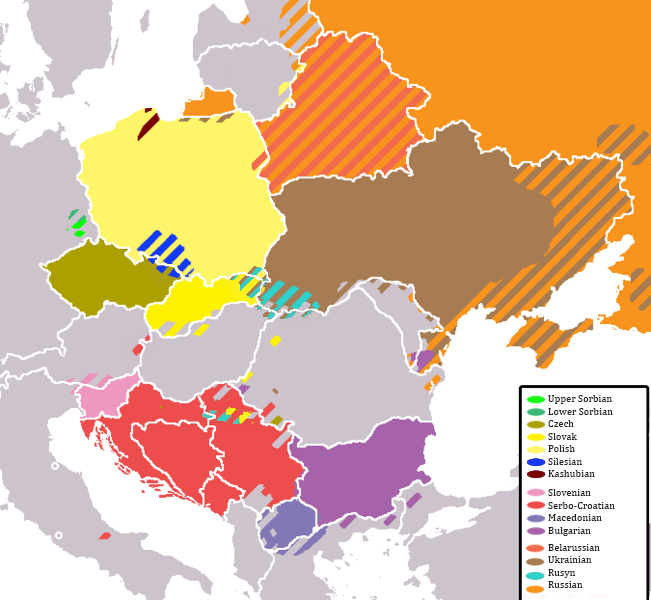
Linguistic maps of Slavic languages

The traditionally accepted tripartite genealogical division of Slavic languages into East, South and West has been in use since the 19th century. Various alternative divisions have been proposed before and afterwards, ranging from two to six branches. The three conventional branches feature some of the following sub-branches and individual languages:

- Slavic
  - East Slavic
    - Belarusian
    - Russian
    - Rusyn (often seen as a dialect of Ukrainian)
    - Ukrainian
      - Podlachian (often seen as a dialect of Ukrainian)
      - West Polesian (often seen as a dialect of Ukrainian)
  - South Slavic
    - Eastern South Slavic
      - Bulgarian
      - Macedonian
      - Old Church Slavonic
    - Western South Slavic
      - Serbo-Croatian
        - Serbian
        - Croatian
        - Bosnian
        - Montenegrin
      - Slovene
  - West Slavic
    - Czech–Slovak
      - Czech
      - Slovak
    - Lechitic
      - Polabian
      - Polish
      - Pomeranian
        - Kashubian
        - Slovincian (often seen as a dialect of Kashubian)
      - Silesian (sometimes seen as a dialect of Polish)
    - Sorbian
      - Lower Sorbian
      - Upper Sorbian

Some linguists speculate that a North Slavic branch has existed as well. The Old Novgorod dialect may have reflected some idiosyncrasies of this group.

Slavic languages diverged from a common proto-language later than any other groups of the Indo-European language family, and enough differences exist between the any two geographically distant Slavic languages to make spoken communication between such speakers cumbersome. As usually found within other language groups, mutual intelligibility between Slavic languages is better for geographically adjacent languages and in the written (rather than oral) form.

The traditional tripartite division of the Slavic languages does not take into account the spoken dialects of each language. In certain cases transitional dialects and hybrid dialects often bridge the gaps between different languages, showing similarities that do not stand out when comparing Slavic literary (i.e. standard) languages. For example, Slovak (West Slavic) and Ukrainian (East Slavic) are bridged by the Rusyn language spoken in Transcarpatian Ukraine and adjacent counties of Slovakia and Ukraine.

== History ==
=== Common roots and ancestry ===
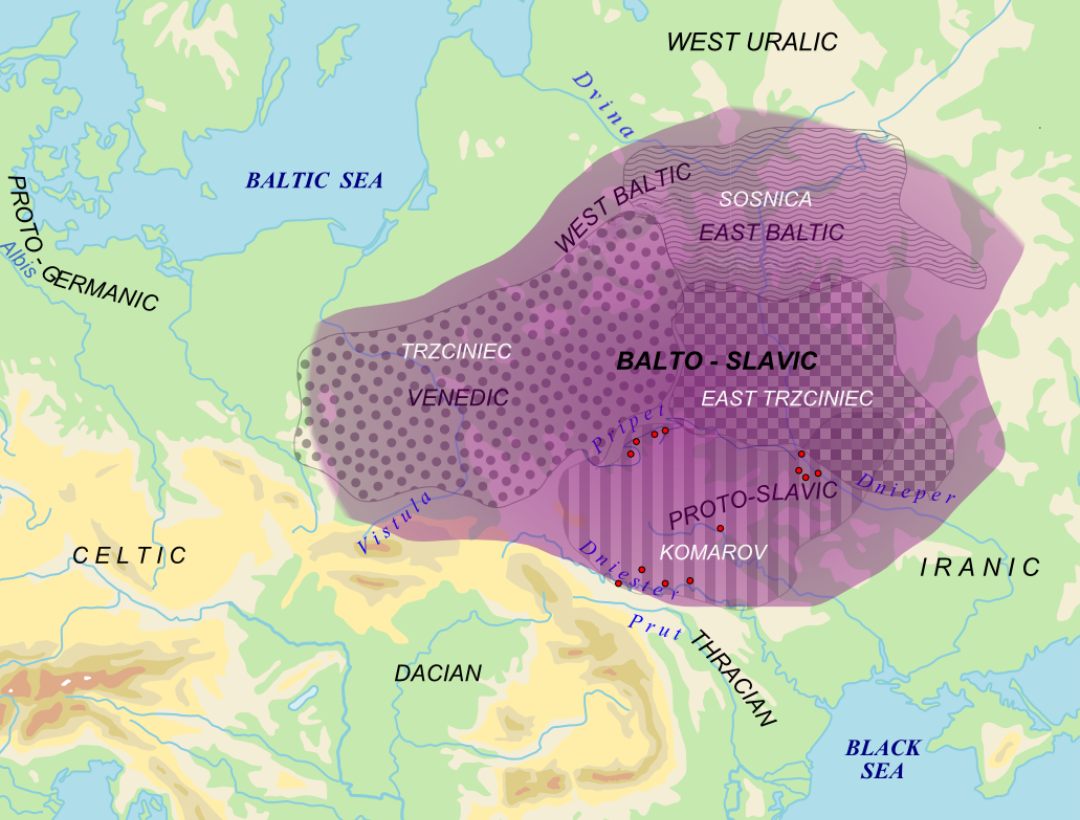
Area of Balto-Slavic dialectic continuum (purple) with proposed material cultures correlating to speakers Balto-Slavic in Bronze Age (white). Red dots = archaic Slavic hydronyms.

Slavic languages descend from their reconstructed ancestor Proto-Slavic, ultimately deriving from Proto-Indo-European, the ancestor language of all Indo-European languages, via a Proto-Balto-Slavic stage. During the Proto-Balto-Slavic period, a number of exclusive isoglosses in phonology, morphology, lexis, and syntax developed, which sets the Balto-Slavic branch apart from other branches of the Indo-European family. The divergence of Slavic and Baltic is estimated — with glottochronology archaeological evidences — at around 1500–1000 BCE.

In the early 20th century, some historical linguistics have challenged the Balto-Slavic model. They attempted to explain the similarities of the two families with areal contact. However, later advances in the field found firm evidence that rejected this opposition and supported a stage of Balto-Slavic unity. This evidence includes shared sound changes, shared core lexicon, and common grammatical innovations. The precise nature of this Balto-Slavic unity is still debated, some scholars believe that internal variations existed in this common stage.

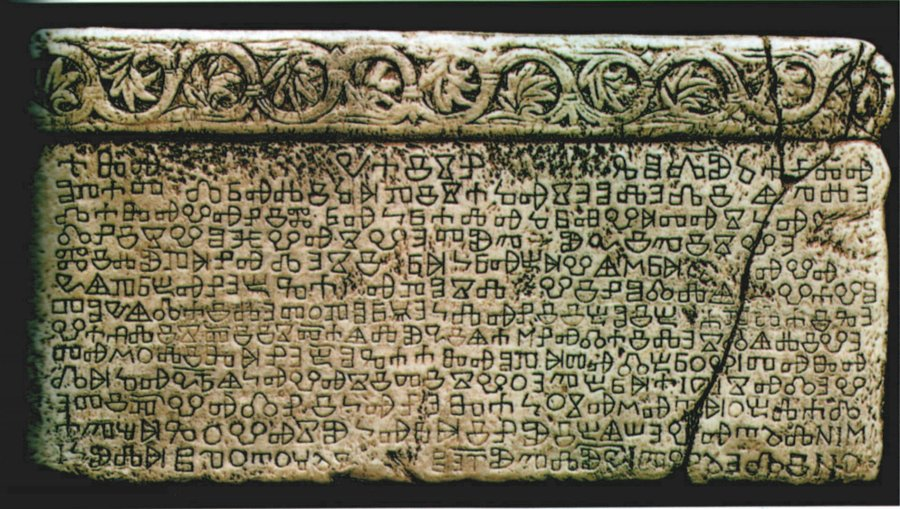
Baška tablet, 11th century, Krk, Croatia

=== Divergence ===
The prehistoric Slavic speakers likely migrated into the Eastern Roman Empire at around the 6th century CE. The first historical accounts of the Slav ethnicity was found around this time. Paired with hydronym evidences, this places the Proto-Slavic speakers around the Dnipro river basin.

In the earliest stage of Proto-Slavic, no dialectal differences could be reconstructed via the comparative method. It has been suggested that the rapid expansion the early history of Slavic is at a rate much greater than natural population growth can account for, which leads some to believe that Slavic was used as a lingua franca in the Avars region. This theory also coincides with the apparent homogeneity of the Proto-Slavic language.

The Slavic languages are traditionally divided into East, West, and South Slavic groups. However, the divergence process between these three groups are not strictly linear, and the borders are not without ambiguity. The divergence of Proto-Slavic begin at around the 7th century, likely caused by the rapid expansion of the Slavic-speaking area, which rendered contact between the three groups infrequent. By some analysis, East Slavic shared marginally more isoglosses with South Slavic than with West Slavic.

Written documents of the 9th, 10th, and 11th centuries already display some local linguistic features. For example, the Freising manuscripts show a language that contains some phonetic and lexical elements peculiar to Slovene dialects (e.g. rhotacism, the word krilatec). The Freising manuscripts are the first Latin-script continuous text in a Slavic language.

The migration of Slavic speakers into the Balkans in the declining centuries of the Byzantine Empire expanded the area of Slavic speech, but the pre-existing writing (notably Greek) survived in this area. The arrival of the Hungarians in Pannonia in the 9th century interposed non-Slavic speakers between South and West Slavs. Frankish conquests completed the geographical separation between these two groups, also severing the connection between Slavs in Moravia and Lower Austria (Moravians) and those in present-day Styria, Carinthia, East Tyrol in Austria, and in the provinces of modern Slovenia, where the ancestors of the Slovenes settled during first colonization.

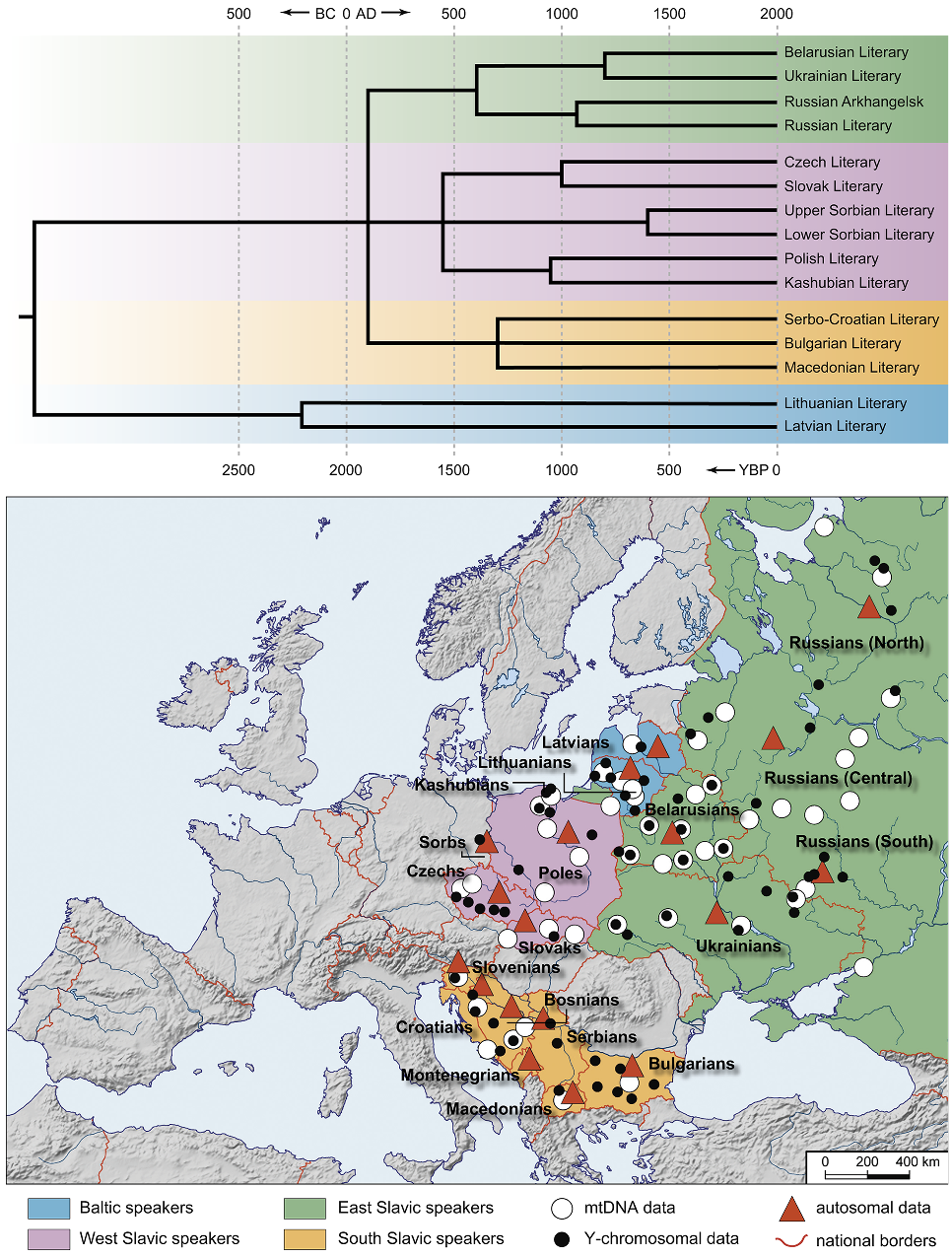
Map and tree of Slavic languages, according to Kassian and A. Dybo

In September 2015, Alexei Kassian and Anna Dybo published, as a part of interdisciplinary study of Slavic ethnogenesis, a lexicostatistical classification of Slavic languages. It was built using qualitative 110-word Swadesh lists that were compiled according to the standards of the Global Lexicostatistical Database project and processed using modern phylogenetic algorithms.

The resulting dated tree complies with the traditional expert views on the Slavic group structure. Kassian-Dybo's tree suggests that Proto-Slavic first diverged into three branches: Eastern, Western and Southern. The Proto-Slavic break-up is dated to around 100 A.D., which correlates with the archaeological assessment of Slavic population in the early 1st millennium A.D. being spread on a large territory and already not being monolithic. Then, in the 5th and 6th centuries A.D., these three Slavic branches almost simultaneously divided into sub-branches, which corresponds to the fast spread of the Slavs through Eastern Europe and the Balkans during the second half of the 1st millennium A.D. (the so-called Slavicization of Europe).

=== Linguistic history ===
The following is a summary of the main changes from Proto-Indo-European (PIE) leading up to the Common Slavic (CS) period immediately following the Proto-Slavic language (PS).

1. Satemisation:
  - PIE *ḱ, *ǵ, *ǵʰ → *ś, *ź, *źʰ (→ CS *s, *z, *z)
  - PIE *kʷ, *gʷ, *gʷʰ → *k, *g, *gʰ
2. Ruki rule: Following *r, *u, *k or *i, PIE *s → *š (→ CS *x)
3. Loss of voiced aspirates: PIE *bʰ, *dʰ, *gʰ → *b, *d, *g
4. Merger of *o and *a: PIE *a/*o, *ā/*ō → PS *a, *ā (→ CS *o, *a)
5. Law of open syllables: All closed syllables (syllables ending in a consonant) are eventually eliminated, in the following stages:
  1. Nasalization: With *N indicating either *n or *m not immediately followed by a vowel: PIE *aN, *eN, *iN, *oN, *uN → *ą, *ę, *į, *ǫ, *ų (→ CS *ǫ, *ę, *ę, *ǫ, *y). (NOTE: *ą *ę etc. indicates a nasalized vowel.)
  2. In a cluster of obstruent (stop or fricative) + another consonant, the obstruent is deleted unless the cluster can occur word-initially.
  3. (occurs later, see below) Monophthongization of diphthongs.
  4. (occurs much later, see below) Elimination of liquid diphthongs (e.g. *er, *ol when not followed immediately by a vowel).
6. First palatalization: *k, *g, *x → CS *č, *ž, *š (pronounced [tʃ], [ʒ], [ʃ] respectively) before a front vocalic sound (*e, *ē, *i, *ī, *j).
7. Iotation: Consonants are palatalized by an immediately following *j:
    - sj, *zj → CS *š, *ž
    - nj, *lj, *rj → CS *ň, *ľ, *ř (pronounced [nʲ lʲ rʲ] or similar)
    - tj, *dj → CS *ť, *ď (probably palatal stops, e.g. [c ɟ], but developing in different ways depending on the language)
    - bj, *pj, *mj, *wj → *bľ, *pľ, *mľ, *wľ (the lateral consonant *ľ is mostly lost later on in West Slavic)
8. Vowel fronting: After *j or some other palatal sound, back vowels are fronted (*a, *ā, *u, *ū, *ai, *au → *e, *ē, *i, *ī, *ei, *eu). This leads to hard/soft alternations in noun and adjective declensions.
9. Prothesis: Before a word-initial vowel, *j or *w is usually inserted.
10. Monophthongization: *ai, *au, *ei, *eu, *ū → *ē, *ū, *ī, *jū, *ȳ [ɨː]
11. Second palatalization: *k, *g, *x → CS *c [ts], *dz, *ś before new *ē (from earlier *ai). *ś later splits into *š (West Slavic), *s (East/South Slavic).
12. Progressive palatalization (or "third palatalization"): *k, *g, *x → CS *c, *dz, *ś after *i, *ī in certain circumstances.
13. Vowel quality shifts: All pairs of long/short vowels become differentiated as well by vowel quality:
    - a, *ā → CS *o, *a
    - e, *ē → CS *e, *ě (originally a low-front sound [æ] but eventually raised to [ie] in most dialects, developing in divergent ways)
    - i, *u → CS *ь, *ъ (also written *ĭ, *ŭ; lax vowels as in the English words pit, put)
    - ī, *ū, *ȳ → CS *i, *u, *y
14. Elimination of liquid diphthongs: Liquid diphthongs (sequences of vowel plus *l or *r, when not immediately followed by a vowel) are changed so that the syllable becomes open:
    - or, *ol, *er, *el → *ro, *lo, *re, *le in West Slavic.
    - or, *ol, *er, *el → *oro, *olo, *ere, *olo in East Slavic.
    - or, *ol, *er, *el → *rā, *lā, *re, *le in South Slavic.
  - Possibly, *ur, *ul, *ir, *il → syllabic *r, *l, *ř, *ľ (then develops in divergent ways).
15. Development of phonemic tone and vowel length (independent of vowel quality): Complex developments (see History of accentual developments in Slavic languages).

== Features ==
The Slavic languages are a relatively homogeneous family, compared with other families of Indo-European languages (e.g. Germanic, Romance, and Indo-Iranian). As late as the 10th century AD, the entire Slavic-speaking area still functioned as a single, dialectally differentiated language, termed Common Slavic. Compared with most other Indo-European languages, the Slavic languages are quite conservative, particularly in terms of morphology (the means of inflecting nouns and verbs to indicate grammatical differences). Most Slavic languages have a rich, fusional morphology that conserves much of the inflectional morphology of Proto-Indo-European. The vocabulary of the Slavic languages is also of Indo-European origin. Many of its elements, which do not find exact matches in the ancient Indo-European languages, are associated with the Balto-Slavic community.

=== Consonants ===
The following table shows the inventory of consonants of Late Common Slavic:

Consonants of Late Proto-Slavic
	Labial		Coronal		Palatal		Velar	
Nasal	m		n		nʲ			
Plosive	p	b	t	d	tʲː	dʲː	k	ɡ
Affricate			ts	dz	tʃ			
Fricative			s	z	ʃ, (sʲ^{1})	ʒ	x	
Trill			r		rʲ			
Lateral			l		lʲ			
Approximant	ʋ				j			

^{1}The sound /sʲ/ did not occur in West Slavic, where it had developed to /ʃ/.

This inventory of sounds is quite similar to what is found in most modern Slavic languages. The extensive series of palatal consonants, along with the affricates *ts and *dz, developed through a series of palatalizations that happened during the Proto-Slavic period, from earlier sequences either of velar consonants followed by front vowels (e.g. *ke, *ki, *ge, *gi, *xe, and *xi), or of various consonants followed by *j (e.g. *tj, *dj, *sj, *zj, *rj, *lj, *kj, and *gj, where *j is the palatal approximant ([j], the sound of the English letter "y" in "yes" or "you").

A further general palatalization occurred near the end of the Common Slavic period, where all consonants became palatalized before front vowels. This produced a large number of new palatalized (or "soft") sounds, which formed pairs with the corresponding non-palatalized (or "hard") consonants and absorbed the existing palatalized sounds *lʲ *rʲ *nʲ *sʲ. These sounds were best preserved in Russian but were lost to varying degrees in other languages (particularly Czech and Slovak). The following table shows the inventory of modern Russian:

Consonant phonemes of Russian
	Labial		Dental & Alveolar		Post- alveolar/ Palatal		Velar	
	hard	soft	hard	soft	hard	soft	hard	soft
Nasal	m	mʲ	n	nʲ				
Stop	p b	pʲ bʲ	t d	tʲ dʲ			k ɡ	kʲ ɡʲ
Affricate			t͡s	(t͡sʲ)		t͡ɕ		
Fricative	f v	fʲ vʲ	s z	sʲ zʲ	ʂ ʐ	ɕː ʑː	x	xʲ
Trill			r	rʲ				
Approximant			l	lʲ		j		

This general process of palatalisation occurred with varying degree of strength across different Slavic languages. In Bosnian and Serbo-Croatian, it did not occur at all. In some East and West Slavic languages — such as Czech, Slovak, and Ukrainian — palatalisation developed strongly but was later reduced.

Late Common Slavic tolerated relatively fewer consonant clusters. However, as a result of the loss of weak vowels known as yers, consonant cluster became more common in modern Slavic languages. The same process also reintroduced consonants at the end of words and syllables, which was forbidden in earlier periods.

=== Vowels ===
A typical vowel inventory is as follows:

	Front	Central	Back
Close	i	(ɨ)	u
Mid	e		o
Open		a	

The sound [ɨ] occurs only in some languages (e.g. Russian and Belarusian), and even in these languages, it is often unclear whether it is its own phoneme or an allophone of /i/. Nonetheless, it is a quite prominent and noticeable characteristic of the languages in which it is present.

- Russian мышь [mɨʂ] and Polish mysz [mɨʂ] "mouse"

Common Slavic also had two nasal vowels: *ę [ẽ] and *ǫ [õ]. However, these are preserved only in modern Polish (along with a few lesser-known dialects and microlanguages; see Yus for more details).

- Polish wąż /vɔ̃ʐ/ and węże /vɛ̃ʐɛ/ "snake, snakes"

Other phonemic vowels are found in certain languages (e.g. the schwa /ə/ in Bulgarian and Slovenian, distinct high-mid and low-mid vowels in Slovenian, and the lax front vowel /ɪ/ in Ukrainian).

=== Length, accent, and tone ===
An area of great difference among Slavic languages is that of prosody (i.e. syllabic distinctions such as vowel length, accent, and tone). Common Slavic had a complex system of prosody, inherited with little change from Proto-Indo-European. This consisted of phonemic vowel length and a free, mobile pitch accent:

- All vowels could occur either short or long, and this was phonemic (it could not automatically be predicted from other properties of the word).
- There was (at most) a single accented syllable per word, distinguished by higher pitch (as in modern Japanese) rather than greater dynamic stress (as in English).
- Vowels in accented syllables could be pronounced with either a rising or falling tone (i.e. there was pitch accent), and this was phonemic.
- The accent was free in that it could occur on any syllable and was phonemic.
- The accent was mobile in that its position could potentially vary among closely related words within a single paradigm (e.g. the accent might land on a different syllable between the nominative and genitive singular of a given word).
- Even within a given inflectional class (e.g. masculine i-stem nouns), there were multiple accent patterns in which a given word could be inflected. For example, most nouns in a particular inflectional class could follow one of three possible patterns: Either there was a consistent accent on the root (pattern A), predominant accent on the ending (pattern B), or accent that moved between the root and ending (pattern C). In patterns B and C, the accent in different parts of the paradigm shifted not only in location but also type (rising vs. falling). Each inflectional class had its own version of patterns B and C, which might differ significantly from one inflectional class to another.

The modern languages vary greatly in the extent to which they preserve this system. On one extreme, Serbo-Croatian preserves the system nearly unchanged (even more so in the conservative Chakavian dialect); on the other, Macedonian has basically lost the system in its entirety. Between them are found numerous variations:

- Slovenian preserves most of the system but has shortened all unaccented syllables and lengthened non-final accented syllables so that vowel length and accent position largely co-occur.
- Russian and Bulgarian have eliminated distinctive vowel length and tone and converted the accent into a stress accent (as in English) but preserved its position. As a result, the complexity of the mobile accent and the multiple accent patterns still exists (particularly in Russian because it has preserved the Common Slavic noun inflections, while Bulgarian has lost them).
- Czech and Slovak have preserved phonemic vowel length and converted the distinctive tone of accented syllables into length distinctions. The phonemic accent is otherwise lost, but the former accent patterns are echoed to some extent in corresponding patterns of vowel length/shortness in the root. Paradigms with mobile vowel length/shortness do exist but only in a limited fashion, usually only with the zero-ending forms (nom. sg., acc. sg., and/or gen. pl., depending on inflectional class) having a different length from the other forms. (Czech has a couple of other "mobile" patterns, but they are rare and can usually be substituted with one of the "normal" mobile patterns or a non-mobile pattern.)
- Old Polish had a system very much like Czech. Modern Polish has lost vowel length, but some former short-long pairs have become distinguished by quality (e.g. [o oː] > [o u]), with the result that some words have vowel-quality changes that exactly mirror the mobile-length patterns in Czech and Slovak.

=== Grammar ===
Similarly, Slavic languages have extensive morphophonemic alternations in their derivational and inflectional morphology, including between velar and postalveolar consonants, front and back vowels, and a vowel and no vowel.

=== Selected cognates ===
The following is a very brief selection of cognates in basic vocabulary across the Slavic language family, which may serve to give an idea of the sound changes involved. This is not a list of translations: cognates have a common origin, but their meaning may be shifted and loanwords may have replaced them. Scientific transliteration of Cyrillic is used. Prosody is marked when phonemic.

Proto-Slavic	Old Church Slavonic	Russian	Ukrainian	Belarusian	Rusyn (Prešov)	Polish	Czech	Slovak	Slovene	Serbo-Croatian	Bulgarian	Macedonian
*uxo (ear)	оухо (uxo)	у́хо (úxo)	ву́хо (vúxo)	ву́ха (vúxa)	у́хо (úxo) / ву́хо (vúxo)	ucho	ucho	ucho	uhọ̑	ȕho (у̏хо) ^{(BCMS)} / ȕvo (у̏во) ^{(MS)}	ухо̀ (uxó)	уво (uvo)
*ogńь (fire)	огн̑ь (ogńь)	ого́нь (ogón')	вого́нь (vohón')	аго́нь (ahón')	оге́нь (ohén') / вге́нь (vhén')	ogień	oheň	oheň	ógenj	òganj (о̀гањ)	о̀гън (ógăn)	оган / огин (ogan / ogin)
*ryba (fish)	рꙑба (ryba)	ры́ба (rýba)	ри́ба (rýba)	ры́ба (rýba)	ры́ба (rýba)	ryba	ryba	ryba	ríba	rȉba (ри̏ба)	рѝба (ríba)	риба (riba)
*gnězdo (nest)	гнѣздо (gnězdo)	гнездо́ (gnezdó)	гнiздо́ (hnizdó)	гняздо́ (hnjazdó)	гнïздо́ (hnjizdó)	gniazdo	hnízdo	hniezdo	gnẹ́zdo	gnijézdo ^{(BC)} / gnijèzdo (гнијѐздо) ^{(MS)} / gnézdo (гне́здо) ^{(S)}	гнездо̀ (gnezdó)	гнездо (gnezdo)
*oko (eye)	око (oko)	о́ко (óko)	о́ко (óko)	во́ка (vóka)	о́ко (óko)	oko	oko	oko	okọ̑	ȍko (о̏ко)	око̀ (okó)	око (oko)
*golva (head)	глава (glava)	голова́ (golová)	голова́ (holová)	галава́ (halavá)	го́лова (hólova)	głowa	hlava	hlava	gláva	gláva (гла́ва)	глава̀ (glavá)	глава (glava)
*rǫka (hand)	рѫка (rǫka)	рука́ (ruká)	рука́ (ruká)	рука́ (ruká)	ру́ка (rúka)	ręka	ruka	ruka	róka	rúka (ру́ка)	ръка̀ (răká)	рака (raka)
*nokťь (night)	нощь (noštь)	но́чь (nóč')	ні́ч (níč)	но́ч (nóč)	ні́ч (níč)	noc	noc	noc	nọ̑č	nȏć (но̑ћ)	но̀щ (nóšt)	ноќ (noḱ)

== Influence on neighboring languages ==
Most languages of the former Soviet Union and of some neighbouring countries (for example, Mongolian) are significantly influenced by Russian, especially in vocabulary. The Romanian, Albanian, and Hungarian languages show the influence of the neighboring Slavic nations, especially in vocabulary pertaining to urban life, agriculture, and crafts and trade—the major cultural innovations at times of limited long-range cultural contact. In each one of these languages, Slavic lexical borrowings represent at least 15% of the total vocabulary. This is potentially because Slavic tribes crossed and partially settled the territories inhabited by ancient Illyrians and Vlachs on their way to the Balkans.

=== Germanic languages ===
Max Vasmer, a specialist in Slavic etymology, has claimed that there were no Slavic loans into Proto-Germanic. However, there are isolated Slavic loans (mostly recent) into other Germanic languages. For example, the word for "border" (in modern German Grenze, Dutch grens) was borrowed from the Common Slavic granica. There are, however, many cities and villages of Slavic origin in Eastern Germany, the largest of which are Berlin, Leipzig and Dresden. English derives quark (a kind of cheese and subatomic particle) from the German Quark, which in turn is derived from the Slavic tvarog, which means "curd". Many German surnames, particularly in Eastern Germany and Austria, are Slavic in origin. The Nordic languages also have torg/torv (market place) from Old Russian tъrgъ (trŭgŭ) or Polish targ, humle (hops), räka/reke/reje (shrimp, prawn), and, via Middle Low German tolk (interpreter) from Old Slavic tlŭkŭ, and pråm/pram (barge) from West Slavonic pramŭ.

=== Finno-Ugric languages ===
Finnic languages have many words in common with Slavic languages. According to Petri Kallio, this suggests Slavic words being borrowed into Finnic languages, as early as Proto-Finnic. Many loanwords have acquired a Finnicized form, making it difficult to say whether such a word is natively Finnic or Slavic.

Russian dialects have numerous borrowings from Finno-Ugric languages, particularly for forest terms and geographical names. This is related to the expansion in 7th to the 11th centuries AD of Slavic people into the areas of Central Russia (near Moscow) previously populated by Finno-Ugric peoples, and the resulting genetic, cultural and linguistic exchange.

=== Other ===
The Czech word robot is now found in most languages worldwide, and the word pistol, probably also from Czech, is found in many European languages.

A well-known Slavic word in almost all European languages is vodka, a borrowing from Russian водка (vodka, lit. 'little water'), from common Slavic voda ('water', cognate to the English word water) with the diminutive ending -ka. Owing to the medieval fur trade with Northern Russia, Pan-European loans from Russian include such familiar words as sable. The English word "vampire" was borrowed (perhaps via French vampire) from German Vampir, in turn derived from Serbo-Croatian вампир (vampir), continuing Proto-Slavic *ǫpyrь, although Polish scholar K. Stachowski has argued that the origin of the word is early Slavic *vąpěrь, going back to Turkic oobyr.

Several European languages, including English, have borrowed the word polje (meaning 'large, flat plain') directly from the former Yugoslav languages (i.e. Slovene and Serbo-Croatian). During the heyday of the USSR in the 20th century, many more Russian words became known worldwide: da, Soviet, sputnik, perestroika, glasnost, kolkhoz, etc. Another borrowed Russian term is samovar (lit. 'self-boiling').

== Detailed list ==
The following tree for the Slavic languages derives from the Ethnologue report for Slavic languages. It includes the ISO 639-1 and ISO 639-3 codes where available.

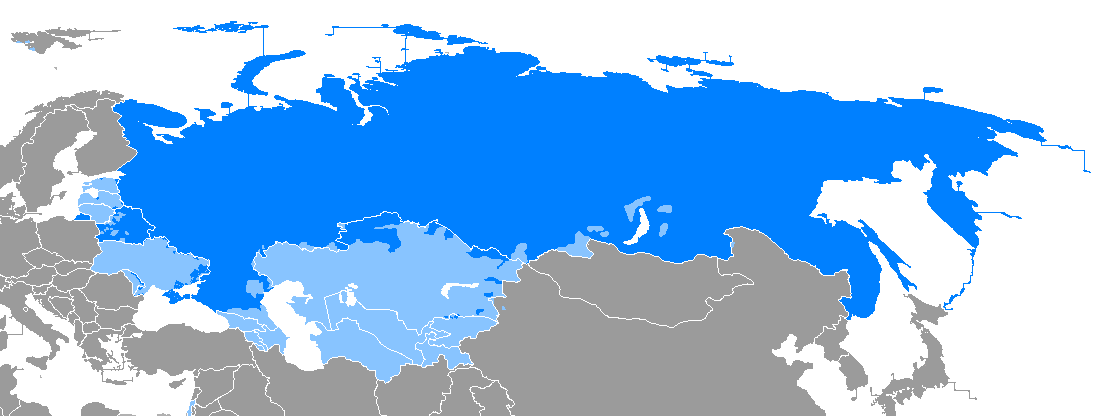
Map of all areas where the Russian language is the language spoken by the majority of the population

South Slavic dialect continuum with major dialect groups

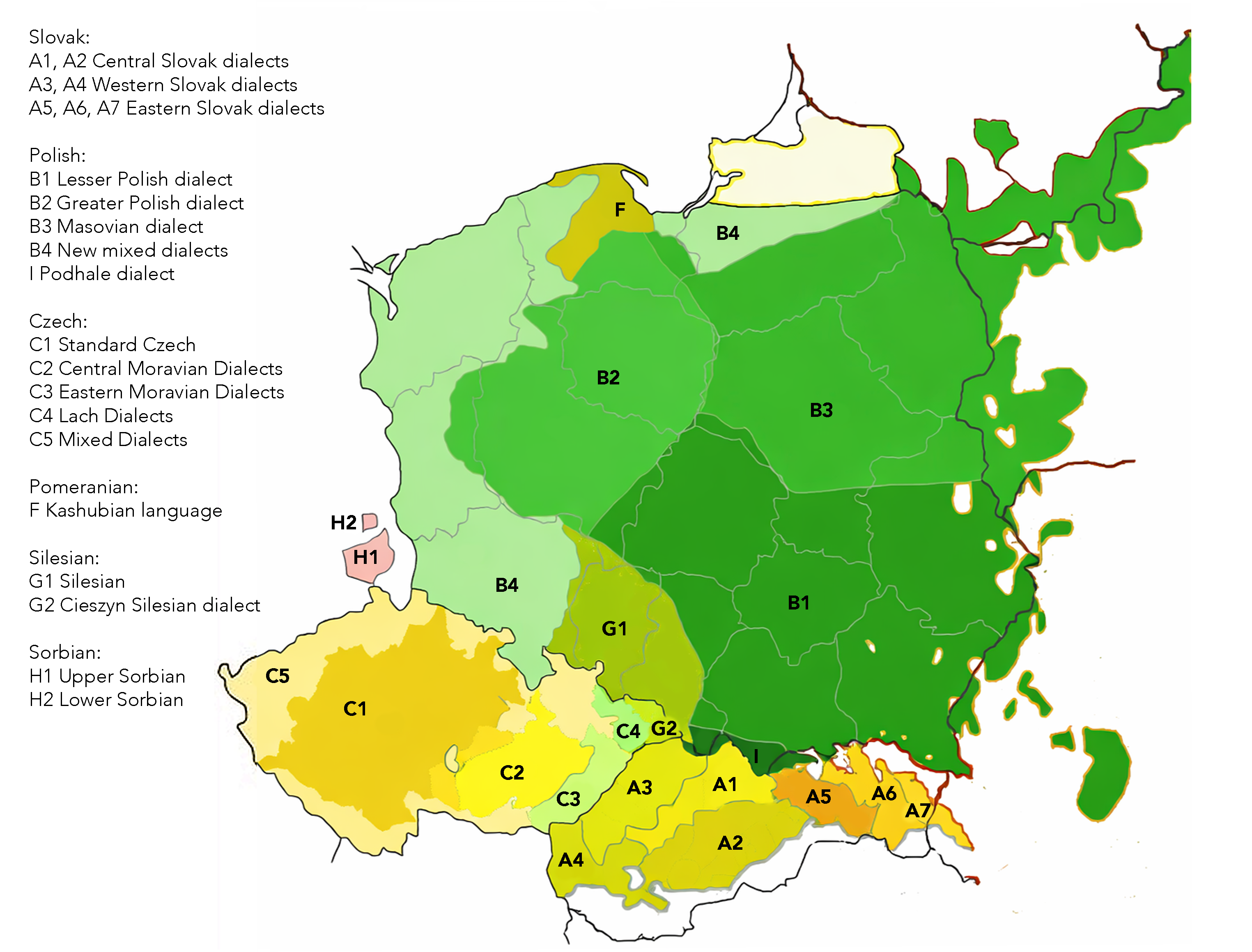
West Slavic dialect continuum with major dialect groups

East Slavic languages:

- Belarusian: ISO 639-1 code: be; ISO 639-3 code: bel
- Russian: ISO 639-1 code: ru; ISO 639-3 code: rus
- Rusyn: ISO 639-3 code: rue
- Ruthenian: ISO 639-3 code: rsk
- Ukrainian: ISO 639-1 code: uk; ISO 639-3 code: ukr

South Slavic languages:

- Western South Slavic languages
  - Bosnian: ISO 639-1 code: bs; ISO 639-3 code: bos
  - Chakavian: ISO 639-3 code: ckm
  - Croatian: ISO 639-1 code: hr; ISO 639-3 code: hrv
  - Montenegrin: ISO 639-3 code: cnr
  - Serbian: ISO 639-1 code: sr; ISO 639-3 code: srp
  - Slavomolisano: ISO 639-3 code: svm
  - Slovene: ISO 639-1 code: sl; ISO 639-3 code: slv
- Eastern South Slavic languages
  - Bulgarian: ISO 639-1 code: bg; ISO 639-3 code: bul
  - Church Slavonic: ISO 639-1 code: cu; ISO 639-3 code: chu
  - Macedonian: ISO 639-1 code: mk; ISO 639-3 code: mkd

West Slavic languages:

- Sorbian languages
  - Lower Sorbian (also known as Lusatian): ISO 639-3 code: dsb
  - Upper Sorbian (also known as Luzadian): ISO 639-3 code: hsb
- Lechitic languages
  - Kashubian: ISO 639-3 code: csb
  - Polish: ISO 639-1 code: pl; ISO 639-3 code: pol
  - Silesian: ISO 639-3 code: szl
- Czech–Slovak languages
  - Czech: ISO 639-1 code: cs; ISO 639-3 code: ces
  - Slovak: ISO 639-1 code: sk; ISO 639-3 code: slk

Para- and supranational languages

- Church Slavonic language, variations of Old Church Slavonic with significant replacement of the original vocabulary by forms from the Old East Slavic and other regional forms. The Bulgarian Orthodox Church, Russian Orthodox Church, Polish Orthodox Church, Macedonian Orthodox Church, Serbian Orthodox Church, and even some Roman Catholic Churches in Croatia continue to use Church Slavonic as a liturgical language. While not used in modern times, the text of a Church Slavonic Roman Rite Mass survives in Croatia and the Czech Republic, which is best known through Janáček's musical setting of it (the Glagolitic Mass).
- Interslavic language, largely based on material that the modern Slavic languages have in common. Its purpose is to facilitate communication between representatives of different Slavic nations and to enable people who do not know any Slavic language to communicate with Slavs. Because Old Church Slavonic had become too archaic and complex for everyday communication, Pan-Slavic language projects have been created from the 17th century onwards in order to provide the Slavs with a common literary language. Interslavic in its current form was standardized in 2011 after the merger of several older projects.

== See also ==
- Language family
- List of Slavic studies journals
- Outline of Slavic history and culture
- Slavic microlanguages
- Slavic names
- Slavic studies

== General references ==
- Lockwood, W.B. A Panorama of Indo-European Languages. Hutchinson University Library, 1972. ISBN 0-09-111020-3 hardback, ISBN 0-09-111021-1 paperback.
- Marko Jesensek, The Slovene Language in the Alpine and Pannonian Language Area, 2005. ISBN 83-242-0577-2
- Kalima, Jalo (April 1947). "Classifying Slavonic languages: Some remarks". The Slavonic and East European Review. 25 (65).
- Richards, Ronald O. (2003). The Pannonian Slavic Dialect of the Common Slavic Proto-language: The View from Old Hungarian. Los Angeles: University of California. ISBN 978-0-9742653-0-8.
