= Political Pilgrims =

1981 book by Paul Hollander

- First edition (1981)
- Author: Paul Hollander
- Subjects: Communism, Intellectualism
- Publisher: Harper Colophon Books (1981), Routledge (4th ed., 2017)
- Publication date: 1981
- Media type: Print
- ISBN: 1-56000-954-3 (4th ed.)
- Dewey Decimal: 306.2
- LC Class: D850.H65 1997

Political Pilgrims: Travels of Western Intellectuals to the Soviet Union, China, and Cuba 1928–1979 (later Political Pilgrims: Western Intellectuals in Search of the Good Society) is a book published by American political sociologist Paul Hollander in 1981.

== Summary ==
Political Pilgrims, is a book is about 20th-century Western intellectuals who travel to the Soviet Union, Maoist China, and Communist Cuba seeking to find utopian societies enacting their brightest hopes for the human future.

Reviewing the book on publication, Leonard Schapiro wrote that Hollander goal was, "to discover the motivation of the travelers."

Hollander details the "trek of pilgrims" to the Soviet Union, "during the terrible years of forced collectivization, famine, terror, and show trials," of the 1930s, where they discovered utopia in Soviet society. Here were all the desirable things that they believed their own societies lacked—social justice and equality, a sense of purpose and community, a great transformation which had triumphed over the wholly black and deplorable past, and, particularly, a humane and progressive penal system. Observations on this last aspect of Soviet life, incidentally, date mainly from the period when literally millions were rotting to death in the concentration camps on trumped-up charges. The travelers whose journeys and written reports Hollander follows include, Hewlett Johnson, Beatrice and Sidney Webb, Harold Laski, Anna Louise Strong, all famous in their day.

According to Schapiro, Hollander asks how, "educated men and women, with trained minds, could throw critical judgment to the winds and come up with such grotesquely misleading findings." He answers that part of the reason lies in the ability of Soviet authorities not merely to produce elaborately faked areas for show, but to welcome Western writers, house them comfortably, feed them well, and "above all," flatter them.

Among the ideas put forward by Hollander in his exploration of the "sources of and reasons" for the estrangement of Western intellectuals from their home countries, Schapiro is particularly persuaded by Hollander's arguments that it can be traced to "the decline of authority in most Western countries; emotional discontent within the individual, which expresses itself in rejection of society; and, above all, the vested interest of the mass media in publicizing the defects of society in the most colorful manner."
