= List of Slavic studies journals =

Academic journals about Slavic history and culture

This is a list of notable and independent English language peer-reviewed academic journals related to Slavic studies. Journals should be published by major universities, professional associations, national or regional historical societies, or notable independent academic publishers. Periodicals published by non-academic government entities should not be included. Journal entries should have references to journal databases (Note: e.g. JSTOR, Project Muse.) and/or the publisher website to demonstrate they meet inclusion requirements. Journals previously published under a different name or by a different publisher should be footnoted.

Subject peoples, linguistic groupings, and regions covered include:

- West Slavs: Poles, Czechs, Slovaks, Sorbs, Kashubians, Moravians, Silesians.
- East Slavs: Russians, Belarusians, Ukrainians, Rusyns.
- South Slavs: Yugoslavs (Slovenes, Croats, Bosnians, Serbs, Montenegrins, Macedonians) and Bulgarians.

This list has a section specifically for historical journals exclusively published before World War II.

== General studies ==
Journals here are primarily but not exclusively related to Slavic history and culture.

- Acta Slavica Iaponica (1983–present); published by the Slavic-Eurasian Research Center at Hokkaido University; ISSN 0288-3503 (print).
- Australian Slavonic and Eastern European Studies (2004–present); published by the University of Melbourne; (Note: Previously published as Melbourne Slavonic Studies (1967–1985).) ISSN 0818-8149 (online).
- Canadian Slavonic Papers (1956–present); (Note: Also published in French under the title Revue Canadienne des Slavistes.) published quarterly by Taylor & Francis for the Canadian Association of Slavists; ISSN 2375-2475.
- Canadian-American Slavic Studies (1967–present); published quarterly by Brill Publishers; ISSN 2210-2396.
- Contemporary European History (1992–present); published by Cambridge University Press; ISSN 1469-2171.
- East European Politics and Societies (1986–present); published by Sage.
- East European Quarterly (1967–2008, 2015–2017); (Note: East European Quarterly was published quarterly by Central European University Budapest and from 1967–2008 by University of Colorado Boulder.) ISSN 2469-4827.
- Europe-Asia Studies (1949–present); published ten times per year by Taylor & Francis; ISSN 0966-8136 (print), ISSN 1465-3427 (online).
- Journal of Slavic Military Studies (1988–present); published quarterly by Taylor & Francis; ISSN 1556-3006. (Note: Previously published as The Journal of Soviet Military Studies, (1988–1992).)
- New Zealand Slavonic Journal (1968–present); (Note: Originally published in 1967 as Journal of the New Zealand Slavists' Association.) published annually by University of Canterbury; ISSN 0028-8683 (online).
- Region: Regional Studies Of Russia, Eastern Europe, And Central Asia (1968–present); published by Slavica and Institute of Russian Studies at the Hankuk University of Foreign Studies. ISSN 2166-4307.
- Slavic and East European Journal (1957–present); (Note: Previously published as AATSEEL Journal (1954–1956), Bulletin of the American Association of Teachers of Slavic and East European Languages (1947–1953), Bulletin of the American Association of Teachers of Slavonic and East European Languages (1945–1946).) published quarterly by the Department of Slavic and East European Languages and Cultures, Ohio State University; ISSN 0037-6752.
- Slavic Review (1941–present); (Note: Slavic Review was previously published as Slavonic Yearbook American Series (1941), Slavonic and East European Review American Series (1943–1944), and American Slavic and East European Review (1945–1961).) published quarterly by Cambridge University Press for the Association for Slavic, East European, and Eurasian Studies; ISSN 2325-7784 (online), ISSN 0037-6779 (print).
- Slavonic and East European Review (1922–1927, 1928–present); (Note: Previously published as The Slavonic Review (1922–1927).) published by the Modern Humanities Research Association and University College London, School of Slavonic and East European Studies; ISSN 0037-6795 (print), ISSN 2222-4327 (online).
- Slovo (1987–present); published by the School of Slavonic and East European Studies, University College London; ISSN 0954-6839 (online).
- Studies in East European Thought (1961–present); (Note: Previously published as Studies in Soviet Thought, (1961–1992).) published by Springer; ISSN 0925-9392 (print), ISSN 1573-0948 (online).

== Regional studies ==
=== Interregional ===
- Acta Baltico-Slavica (1964–present); published by the Białostockie Towarzystwo Naukowe until 1977, the Ossolineum until 1992, and the Institute of Slavic Studies at the Polish Academy of Sciences from then on; ISSN 0065-1044 (print), ISSN 2392-2389 (online).

=== Polish ===
- The Polish Review (1942–1945, 1956–2019); (Note: Previously published as Bulletin of the Polish Institute of Arts and Sciences in America from 1942–1945.) published by The Polish Institute of Arts and Sciences of America and University of Illinois Press; ISSN 0032-2970 (print), ISSN 2330-0841 (online).

=== Russian ===
- Journal of Modern Russian History and Historiography (2008–present); published annually by Brill Schöningh; ISSN 1947-9956 (print), ISSN 2210-2388 (online).
- Kritika: Explorations in Russian and Eurasian History (2000–present); published by Slavica Publishers; ISSN 1531-023X (print), ISSN 1538-5000 (online).
- Revolutionary Russia (1988–present); published twice per year by Taylor & Francis; ISSN 0954-6545 (print), ISSN 1743-7873 (online).
- Russian History (Brill journal) (1974–present, in English); published quarterly by Brill Publishers; ISSN 0094-288X (print), ISSN 1876-3316 (online). ISO 4 Russ. Hist.. Informally abbreviated RuHi.
- Russian History (RAS journal) (Российская история, Rossiiskaya istoriia) (1957–present, in Russian); published bi-monthly by the Institute of History of the Russian Academy of Sciences (RAS); ISSN 0869-5687. Formerly named History of the USSR (История СССР, Istoriia SSSR) (1957–1992) and National History (Отечественная история, Otechestvennaia istoriia) (1992–2008).
- Russian Review (1941–present); published by quarterly Brill Publishers and University of Kansas; ISSN 0036-0341 (print), ISSN 1467-9434 (online).
- Russian Studies in History (1962–1992, 1992–present); (Note: Previously published as Soviet Studies in History (1962–1992).) published quarterly by Taylor & Francis; ISSN 1061-1983 (print), ISSN 1558-0881 (online).

=== Ukrainian ===
- East/West: Journal of Ukrainian Studies (2014–present); (Note: Previously published as Journal of Ukrainian Studies (1976-2012); ISSN 0228-1635.) published twice a year by Canadian Institute of Ukrainian Studies, University of Alberta; ISSN 2292-7956 (online).
- Harvard Ukrainian Studies (1977–present); published by the Ukrainian Research Institute at Harvard University; ISSN 0363-5570 (print), ISSN 2328-5400 (online).
- Journal of Belarusian Studies (1965–present); published by Brill Publishers; ISSN 0075-4161 (print).
- Krytyka (1997–present). English/Ukrainian. Published by Krytyka Group. ISSN 1563-6461.

=== Soviet ===
- Demokratizatsiya: The Journal of Post-Soviet Democratization (1985–present); published quarterly by the Institute for European, Russian, and Eurasian Studies, George Washington University; ISSN 1074-6846 (print), ISSN 1940-4603 (online).
- Soviet Studies (1949–1992). (Note: Journal is currently published as Europe-Asia Studies by Taylor & Francis)
- Studies in Soviet Thought (1961–1992); (Note: Currently published as Studies in East European Thought (1992–present)) published by Springer; ISSN 0925-9392 (print), ISSN 1573-0948 (online).

=== Serbo-Croatian ===
- Tragovi: Journal for Serbian and Croatian Topics (2018–present); published biannually by the Serb National Council and the Archive of Serbs in Croatia; ISSN 2623-8926 (print), ISSN 2718-3467 (online).

== Topical ==
Journals here may not be primarily about Slavic history and culture but have significant coverage.

- Journal of Slavic Linguistics published by The Slavic Linguistics Society and Slavica Publishers; ISSN 1068-2090 (print), ISSN 1543-0391 (online).
- Starobulgarska Literatura: Journal for Medieval Bulgarian Literature and Culture (1979–present); published by the Institute for Literature of the Bulgarian Academy of Sciences; ISSN 0204-868X (print), ISSN 2535-0919 (online).

== Other geographic areas ==
This section contains journals about related geographic areas with significant coverage of Slavic history and culture. (Note: For example, Central Asia now has a large non-indigenous Slavic population.)

- Central Asian Survey (1982–present); published quarterly by Taylor & Francis; ISSN 0263-4937 (print), ISSN 1465-3354 (online).
- Journal of Baltic Studies (1970–present); published by Taylor & Francis; (Note: Previously published as The Bulletin of Baltic Studies, (1970).) ISSN 0162-9778 (print), ISSN 1751-7877 (online).
- Sibirica: Journal of Siberian Studies (2001–present); published by Berghahn; ISSN 1361-7362 (print), ISSN 1476-6787 (online).
- Scrinia slavonica (2001–present); published by the Department for the History of Slavonia, Syrmia and Baranja of the Croatian Institute of History; ISSN 1332-4853 (print), ISSN 1848-9109 (online).

== Related fields and topics ==
This section contains journals from fields related to history and culture (Note: For example, political science) that have significant coverage of Slavic history and culture or non-Slavic historical and cultural topics (Note: For example Cold War history.) that have significant coverage of Slavic history and culture.

- Cold War History (2000–present); published quarterly by Taylor & Francis; ISSN 1468-2745 (print), ISSN 1743-7962 (online).
- Communist and Post-Communist Studies (1962–present); (Note: Previously published as Communist Affairs (1962–1967), Studies in Comparative Communism (1968–1992).) published by University of California Press; ISSN 0039-3592 (print), ISSN 1878-3341 (online).
- Eastern European Economics (1962–present); published quarterly by Taylor & Francis; ISSN 0012-8775 (print), ISSN 1557-9298 (online).
- Journal of Borderlands Studies (1986–present); five issues per year published by Taylor & Francis for the Association for Borderlands Studies; ISSN 0886-5655 (print), ISSN 2159-1229 (online).
- Journal of Cold War Studies (1999–present); published by MIT Press; ISSN 1520-3972 (print), ISSN 1531-3298 (online).
- Politics, Religion & Ideology (2000–present); (Note: Previously published as Totalitarian Movements and Political Religions.) published quarterly by Taylor & Francis; ISSN 2156-7689 (print), ISSN 2156-7697 (online).

== Historical journals ==
This section includes academic journals published exclusively prior to World War II.

- Under construction

== See also ==
- List of Russian studies centers
- Outline of Slavic history and culture
