= Slovo (newspaper) =

Bulgarian newspaper (1922-1924)

Slovo (Bulgarian: Слово, 'Word') was a daily newspaper published in Bulgaria from 1922 until 1944. The newspaper fiercely opposed the Aleksandar Stamboliyski government and also the communist movement.

Aleksandar Grekov served as director of the newspaper. After Grekov was assassinated, Prof. Nikola Milev took over the editorship of Slovo.
