= Slovo (London) =

- Discipline: Slavic studies, East European studies, Central Asian studies
- Language: English
- Edited by: Ekaterina Dudakova (2023-present)

Publication details
- History: 1988-present
- Publisher: UCL Press (United Kingdom)
- Frequency: Biannually

Standard abbreviations
- ISO 4: Slovo

Indexing
- ISSN: 0954-6839

Links
- Journal homepage

Slovo is a biannual academic journal edited and managed entirely by postgraduates of the University College London School of Slavonic and East European Studies. Slovo is an interdisciplinary publication covering Russian, Eurasian, Central and East European affairs, from the fields of anthropology, economics, film, geography, history, international relations, linguistics, literature, media, politics and sociology. Slovo was produced and distributed through Maney Publishing, but is now available online only through UCL Press.

The first issue of Slovo appeared in May 1988 and included contributions from staff members Geoffrey Hosking and György Schöpflin.

== See also ==
- List of Slavic studies journals
