= Acta Slavica Iaponica =

- Discipline: Slavistics, Eastern European Studies
- Language: English, Russian
- Edited by: Daisuke Adachi, Yoichi Isahaya

Publication details
- History: 1983-present
- Publisher: Slavic-Eurasian Research Center (Japan)
- Frequency: annual
- Open access: Yes

Standard abbreviations
- ISO 4: Acta Slav. Iaponica

Indexing
- ISSN: 0288-3503

Links
- Journal homepage

Acta Slavica Iaponica is an annual peer-reviewed academic journal published by the Slavic-Eurasian Research Center (Hokkaido University). It focuses on Slavistics and Eastern European Studies, accepting a wide variety of topics but especially those connected with Japan, including international relations, economics, literary studies, and Slavic history. It was and continues to be a print journal, today it is also open access. The journal was established in 1983.

== History ==
Its first volume was reviewed in the Jahrbücher für Geschichte Osteuropas, noting its publication of an index of Suravu Kenkyu with English summaries for many articles for 1957–1982, as well as its report on Russian and Slavic holdings in Japanese libraries.

Some issues are topical. Volume 2 was devoted to the "Order Orientation and Liberal Tendencies in Soviet and East European Societies, Volume 5 to "The Soviet Union Faces Asia: Perceptions and Policies". Much of Volume 9 was devoted to Japan–Soviet and Japan–Russia relations.

There have been a total of 45 volumes as of 2024.

== See also ==
- List of Slavic studies journals

== Sources ==
- CEEOL (2016). "Acta Slavica Iaponica". Central and Eastern European Online Library. Archived from the original on 2017-01-09.
- n.s. (2013). "Acta Slavica Iaponica". スラブ･ユーラシア研究センター.
- Mochizuki, Tetsuo (1991). "Current Survey of Periodicals: Acta Slavica Iaponica". Japanese Slavic and East European Studies. 12. The Japanese Society for Slavic and East European Studies: 155. doi:10.5823/jsees.12.0_155. ISSN 0389-1186.
- Sch., P. (1984). "Review: Collegium Slavicum Academiae Hokkaido. - Acta Slavica Iaponica. Tomus I. Sapporo, Japan 1983. 183 S.". Jahrbücher für Geschichte Osteuropas. Neue Folge (in German). 32 (2): 309. ISSN 0021-4019. JSTOR 41046822.
