= Aleksandr Dulichenko =

Russian-Estonian linguist (1941–2026)

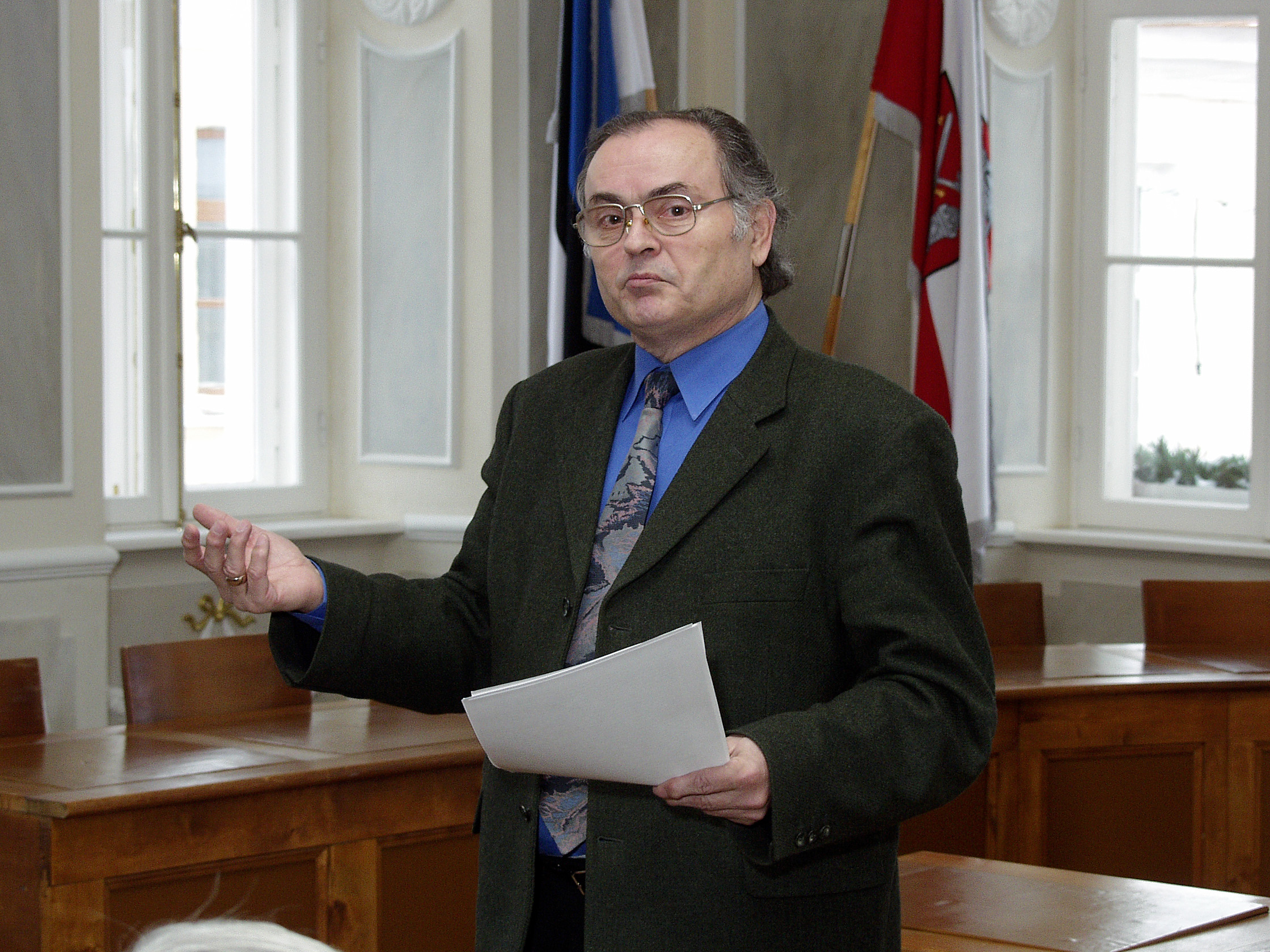
Dulichenko in 2005

Aleksandr Dmitrievich Dulichenko (alternatively Alexander Duličenko; Russian: Александр Дмитриевич Дуличенко; 1941 – 4 March 2026) was a Russian-Estonian Esperantist, linguist, and expert in Slavic microlanguages who lived in Estonia. He was a professor at the University of Tartu, where he was the head of the department of Slavic studies.

== Life and career ==
Dulichenko was born in Krasnodar in 1941. He was the editor of Interlinguistica Tartuensis, a journal on interlinguistics published by the University of Tartu that published seven volumes from 1982 to 1990 recording the proceedings of colloquia at Tartu; in 2006, an eighth volume was published.

A festschrift in Dulichenko's honor was organized in 2006; Humphrey Tonkin calls this volume a "particularly important addition to the literature" of interlinguistics and Esperanto studies.

Dulichenko died on 4 March 2026, at the age of 84.
