= Nikolai Shelyagovich =

Belarusian journalist and politician

Nikolai Shelyagovich (born 21 July 1956, village Ogdemer, Drahichyn District, Brest Region, BSSR) is an initiator and proponent of the idea of the establishment of Polesian autonomy in Soviet Byelorussia in the 1980s. However, he and his associated received almost no support and the campaign eventually melted away. In particular, writer Nil Hilevich and some others spoke against him, claiming threat to the national integrity of Belarus, which was labelled as "Yotvingian separatism".

Since the mid-1990s, he has worked for the holding «SHELENG GROUP», from April 2008 - Deputy Chairman of the Board of Directors of Alliance "Russian automation systems".
