= Slavic-Eurasian Research Center =

Slavic-Eurasian Research Center (Japanese: スラブ・ユーラシア研究センター Surabu yūrashia kenkyū sentā) is a scholarly institute at Hokkaido University, Sapporo, Hokkaido, Japan. This center specializes in research on the post-Soviet states and their inhabitants across Eurasia.

== History ==
The origins of the Slavic-Eurasian Research Center’s traces back to the Cold War. A year after the end of the US occupation of Japan (28 April 1952), a decision was taken at Hokkaido University on 24 June 1953, to coordinate research and activities of scholars who did research within the broad remit of Soviet and Communist studies or Area studies. Two years later, on 1 June 1955, the group was formalized as a Slavic Institute, incorporated in the University’s Faculty of Law. On 1 April 1978, this institute gained organizational independence and was renamed as the Slavic Research Center (SRC).

In recognition of the geopolitical changes that followed the end of communism in Europe and the breakup of the Soviet Union (thus obviating the validity of Communist studies), on 1 April 2014, the center was renamed as the Slavic-Eurasian Research Center (SRC).

== Research divisions ==
Present research in the Slavic-Eurasian Research Center is conducted in the following divisions:

- Russian Studies
- Siberian and Far Eastern Studies
- Central Eurasian Studies
- East European Studies
- Comparative Studies
- Eurasian Unit for Border Research

== Collaboration with foreign partners ==
In 2018, the SRC collaborated with 27 universities and research institutes from across Eurasia. Within the framework of the SRC's Foreign Visitors Fellowship Program, since 1978, tens of foreign scholars have been invited to do research at the Slavic-Eurasian Research Center, for instance, Norman Davies, Tsuyoshi Hasegawa, Tomasz Kamusella, Dariusz Kołodziejczyk, Stephen Kotkin, Vladislav Krasnov, Taras Kuzio, David Marples, Vojtech Mastny, Alexander Nekrich, Sabrina Ramet, Jadwiga Staniszkis, and Jerzy Tomaszewski.

== Publications ==
- Acta Slavica Iaponica
- Slavic Studies
