= David Waters =

David Waters may refer to:

- David Waters (actor), (born; 1948) British Australian film, television and stage actor
- David Waters, the killer of the American atheist activist Madalyn Murray O'Hair
- Dave Waters (wrestler), member of the UK Pitbulls
- David Watkin Waters, (1911-2012) British naval historian
- David Waters (rugby union) (born 1955), Welsh rugby union player
