= Robert Fox (historian) =

British historian of science (born 1938)

- Fox in 2013
- Born: 7 October 1938 (age 88)
- Occupation: Historian of science
- Known for: The Savant and the State and other books
- Awards: George Sarton Medal (2015); Koyré Medal (2017)

Academic background
- Education: University of Oxford (B.A. 1961, M.A. 1965, D.Phil. 1967)
- Thesis: The study of the thermal properties of gases in relation to physical theory from Montgolfier to Regnault
- Doctoral advisor: Alistair Cameron Crombie

Academic work
- Discipline: History of science
- Institutions: University of Lancaster (1966–1988); University of Oxford (1988–2006 (emeritus))
- Main interests: History of science, French history, European history

Dr. Robert Fox (born 7 October 1938) MA, DPhil, FSA FRHistS is a leading British authority on the history of science. He is interested in the history of sciences and technology in Europe from the 18th century onwards. He has published extensively. His book The Savant and the State examines science, culture and politics in France between 1814 and 1914, while Science without Frontiers examines developments from the late nineteenth-century until the Second World War. In 2015, Fox received the George Sarton Medal, the premier award of the international History of Science Society (HSS). He was recognized as a Chevalier of the Ordre des Arts et des Lettres by France's Ministry of Culture in 2006.

== Education ==
Robert Fox attended the Imperial College of Science and Technology at the University of London from 1957 to 1958, followed by Oriel College, Oxford. He received a BA (Oxon) in Physics in 1961, an MA (Oxon) in 1965, and a D.Phil. (Oxon) from the Faculty of Modern History in 1967, supervised by Alistair Cameron Crombie. His thesis was The study of the thermal properties of gases in relation to physical theory from Montgolfier to Regnault.

== Career ==
Robert Fox taught at the University of Lancaster between 1966 and 1988, first as a lecturer and later as professor of the History of Science.

Between 1986 and 1988, Fox was director of research at the Centre de recherche en histoire des sciences et des techniques (CRHST) at the Cité des sciences et de l'industrie in Paris, and assistant director of the Science Museum, London.

In 1988, Fox became a professor of history of science at the University of Oxford; retiring from that position in 2006. Fox is now an Emeritus Professor of the history of science at the University of Oxford, England, an Emeritus Fellow of Linacre College and an Honorary Fellow of Oriel College. He was succeeded as chair of the history of science by Pietro Corsi.

Fox was the first organizer of the annual Thomas Harriot Lectures at Oriel College, Oxford. He has edited two volumes based on the lecture series: Thomas Harriot. An Elizabethan Man of Science (2000) and Thomas Harriot and His World. Mathematics, Exploration, and Natural Philosophy in Early Modern England (2012).

Since 2006, Fox has been a visiting professor at Johns Hopkins University, East Carolina University, the Czech Technical University in Prague, the Horning Visiting Scholar at Oregon State University (2013), and the Gordon Cain Distinguished Fellow at the Chemical Heritage Foundation in Philadelphia (2013).

Fox was the founding president of the European Society for the History of Science, which was founded on 12 October 2003, and served through 2006. Fox has also served as president of the British Society for the History of Science and the International Union of History and Philosophy of Science.

Between 2008 and 2014, Fox edited Notes and Records: the Royal Society Journal of the History of Science.

Fox has appeared on the BBC radio program In Our Time, discussing the work of the Curie family: Marie and Pierre Curie, their daughter Irène Joliot-Curie and her husband Frédéric Joliot-Curie.

== Awards and honors ==
- 2018, Gustav Neuenschwander Prize, the lifetime award of the European Society for the History of Science
- 2017, Alexandre Koyré Medal, the lifetime career award of the International Academy of the History of Science
- 2015, George Sarton Medal, the premier award of the international History of Science Society (HSS)
- 2006, Chevalier of the Ordre des Arts et des Lettres, French Ministry of Culture
- 2004, Oskar von Miller Gold Medal, Deutsches Museum, Munich
- 1998, Dickinson Medal of the Newcomen Society for the History of Technology
- 1989, Elected as Fellow of the Society of Antiquaries of London
- 1988, Chevalier in the Ordre des Palmes Académiques
- 1986, Honorary Doctorate from Heriot-Watt University
- 1986, Full Member of the International Academy of the History of Science (Académie Internationale d'Histoire des Sciences)
- 1981, Corresponding member of the Académie Internationale d'Histoire des Sciences
- 1974, Fellow of the Royal Historical Society

== Bibliography ==
Fox has published extensively as an author, editor and contributor. Some of his works include:

- Fox, Robert (1971). The caloric theory of gases: from Lavoisier to Regnault. Oxford: Clarendon Press. ISBN 9780198581314.
- Fox, Robert (1992). The culture of science in France, 1700–1900. Aldershot, Hampshire: Variorum. ISBN 9780860783398.
- Fox, Robert; Guagnini, Anna, eds. (1993). Education, technology and industrial performance in Europe, 1850–1939 (1st ed.). Cambridge: Cambridge University Press. ISBN 9780521381536.
- Fox, Robert; Guagnini, Anna (1999). Laboratories, workshops, and sites: concepts and practices of research in industrial Europe, 1800–1914 (1st ed.). Berkeley, CA: Office for History of Science and Technology, University of California. ISBN 978-0967261706.
- Buchwald, Jed Z.; Fox, Robert, eds. (2013). The Oxford handbook of the history of physics (1st ed.). Oxford: Oxford University Press. ISBN 9780199696253.
- Fox, Robert; Gooday, Graeme, eds. (2005). Physics in Oxford, 1839–1939 laboratories, learning, and college life (1st ed.). Oxford: Oxford University Press. ISBN 9780198567929.
- Gillispie, Charles Coulston; Fox, Robert; Grattan-Guinness, Ivor (1997). Pierre-Simon LaPlace: 1749–1827: a life in exact science (2nd ed.). Princeton, N.J.: Princeton University Press. ISBN 9780691011851.
- Carnot, Sadi; Fox, Robert (1986), Reflections on the Motive Power of Fire: a Critical Edition with the Surviving Scientific Manuscripts, Manchester University Press; Lilian Barber Press, New York, ISBN 978-0-936508-16-0
- Fox, Robert (2012). The savant and the state: science and cultural politics in Nineteenth-Century France. Baltimore: Johns Hopkins University Press. ISBN 978-1421405223.
- Fox, Robert (1995). Science, industry, and the social order in post-revolutionary France. Aldershot: Variorum. ISBN 9780860784814.
- Fox, Robert, ed. (1998). Technological change: methods and themes in the history of technology (2nd ed.). Amsterdam: Harwood. ISBN 9783718657926.
- Fox, Robert (2016). Science without Frontiers: Cosmopolitanism and National Interests in the World of Learning, 1870–1940. Oregon State University Press. ISBN 9780870718670.

Professional and academic associations
Preceded by Creation	President of the European Society for the History of Science; 2003–2006	Succeeded by Eberhard Knobloch
Preceded by William Hodson Brock	President of the British Society for the History of Science; 1980–1982	Succeeded by Jack B. Morrell
