= Pietro Corsi =

Italian historian of science

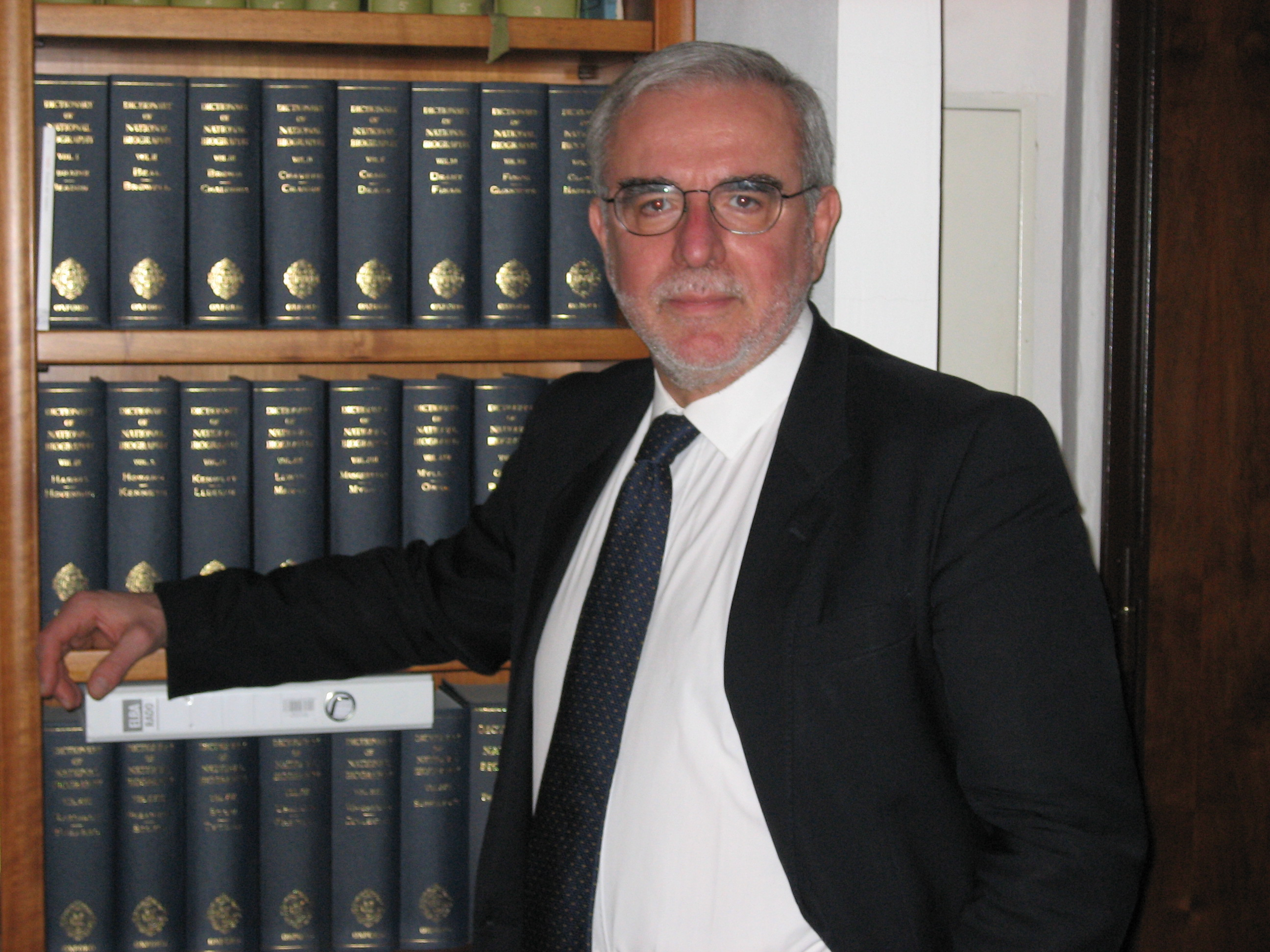
- Born: 20 July 1948 (age 78); Trieste, Italy
- Occupation: historian of science

Pietro Corsi (born 20 July 1948) is an Italian historian of science and emeritus Professor of the History of Science at the University of Oxford.

== Biography ==
From 1967, Pietro Corsi studied at the Faculty of Philosophy, The University of Pisa, and was also a pupil of the Class of Letters, The Scuola Normale Superiore, Pisa. Under the supervision of Francesco Barone and Gilberto Bernardini, he worked on selected issues in the history of science. In particular, he completed yearly theses on the works of Galileo Galilei, René Descartes, and the historiographic conceptions elaborated by Alexandre Koyré. His final thesis reconstructed the relationship between epistemology and the history of science in France, from Henri Poincaré to Alexandre Koyré. From 1971 to 1981, Corsi occupied research positions at the Faculty of Philosophy, The University of Pisa; the Wellcome Unit for the History of Medicine, The University of Oxford; the King's College, The University of Cambridge (1981–1982). In 1981 Corsi obtained a D. Phil in the History of Science from the Queen's College, Oxford. From 1983 to 1987 he was assistant professor at the Department of the History of Science, Harvard University.

In 1987, Corsi was appointed associate professor of the history of science at the University of Cassino, Italy, and full professor in 1997. On special leave from 1997 to 2015, he has been in succession director of the Italian Cultural Institute in Paris (1997–2001); professor of the history of science at the Université Paris 1, Panthéon-Sorbonne (1999–2006); Directeur d'études cumulant at the École des Hautes Études en Sciences Sociales, Paris (2000–2018); director of the Centre d'histoire des sciences et des techniques, La Cité des sciences et de l'industrie, Paris (2001–2005). From 2006 to 2015 he has been chair professor of the history of science, The University of Oxford.

In 1991, Corsi was awarded the Palmes Académiques by the French government, and in 2016 he was the Marc–August Pictet medallist of the Société de Physique et d'histoire naturelle of Geneva.

Corsi has collaborated with various history of science journals, such as Annals of Science, The British Journal for the History of Science and the Journal of the History of Biology. From 1982 to 2016, he was at various times member of the editorial board of Nuncius, Isis-Journal of the History of Science Society, Histoire du CNRS, Notes and records of the Royal Society of London, Centaurus, HOPOS: The Journal of the International Society for the History of Philosophy of Science. Together with Massimo Piattelli-Palmarini, he established KOS, the first journal entirely devoted to the complex roles of images in the history of science (1983–1987). From 1983 to 1986 he was Editor-in-chief the US edition of the Italian art magazine FMR. In 1992, with the help of Benedetta Craveri, Roberto Calasso, Furio Colombo, and Umberto Eco, Corsi launched the Italian language edition of The New York Review of Books, La Rivista dei Libri, of which he was Editor-in-Chief (1992–2010).

Corsi has been involved in several major exhibitions as scientific secretary or member of the scientific committee. In 1989 he authored La fabbrica del pensiero: dall’arte della memoria alle neuroscienze, organized by the Museo Galileo – Istituto e Museo di Storia della Scienza, Florence. The main body of the exhibition was also shown in Paris, Cité des sciences et de l'Industrie, and Madrid, Museo Nacional de Ciencias Naturales, whereas an itinerant version visited scores of towns in Italy, France, Belgium, Denmark, Finland, Hungary, and the United States. The exhibition catalogue was printed in Italian and French by Electa, Milan and the English language edition was published by Oxford University Press US under the title The Enchanted Loom. Chapters in the History of Science. The exhibition explored the relationship between the sciences of the brain and of the mind and wider cultural dimensions (the visual arts, philosophy, the social sciences, computer science) from the Renaissance to the theory of neural Darwinism put forward by Gerald Edelman. A follow up exhibition, Drugs and the Brain, circulated widely throughout schools and abuse-prevention agencies in Italy and Europe. Corsi has also served on the scientific committees of Tous les savoirs du monde, displayed on the occasion of the opening of the Bibliothèque François Mitterrand in Paris (1996), and l'Âme au corps, authored by Jean Clair and Jean-Pierre Changeux (Paris, Grand Palais, 1994).

From 1994 to 2004, Corsi has been the "Editor for science, 1600–2000" of the New Oxford Dictionary of National Biography, under the General Editorship of Colin Matthew (67 vol.) and since 2014 is the Editor for Science of the Dizionario Biografico degli Italiani. Corsi has also experimented with Internet Technologies in the history of science: the website devoted to Jean-Baptiste Lamarck, his works and heritage, opened in 1998, followed in 2002 by the website Lavoisier, Buffon (2004), and a website devoted to the history of geological cartography in Italy and France (2004).

== Research ==
Corsi's early research focused on the career and controversial doctrines of Jean Baptiste Lamarck, with particular reference to his biology and taxonomy. The reconstruction of the wider theoretical and chronological context of Lamarck's work spanned from the dissolution of the theoretical and institutional empire of Georges-Louis Leclerc de Buffon to the debates on the evolutionary theories put forward by Charles Darwin. The research was presented in Oltre il mito: Lamarck e le scienze naturali del suo tempo (Bologna, Il Mulino, 1983); a new English language edition, under the title The Age of Lamarck: Evolutionary Theories in France (1790–1830) was published in 1988 by the University of California Press. In 2001 Éditions du CNRS published a much-revised edition, Lamarck. Genèse et enjeux du transformisme 1770–1830 (2001), with appendices devoted to the prosopography of the 978 pupils who attended Lamarck's lectures at the Muséum national d'histoire naturelle from 1795 to 1823, and to the transcription of notes taken at his classes. In several publications, Corsi also explored the relationship between the intellectual and the social practices of natural sciences during the French Revolution, the Empire and the Restoration, and paid particular attention to the large population of naturalists writing for periodicals, encyclopaedias and dictionaries.

The study of Lamarck was paralleled by the exploration of the reception of his doctrines in the United Kingdom during the first half of the nineteenth century. Debates on Lamarck reflected the complex social and cultural changes that paved the way to the acceptance of various brands of evolutionary doctrines during the second half of the century. The doctoral dissertation Corsi discussed at Oxford in 1981 examined the role of the philosophy of science, natural theology, and the question of species in the works of the Reverend Baden Powell (1796–1860), Savilian Professor of Geometry at Oxford and the first Anglican theologian to fully embrace Darwin's theories. This unduly neglected protagonist of scientific and theological debates of his days offered a healthy corrective to the Darwin-centred accounts of debates on evolution in early nineteenth-century England (Science and religion: Baden Powell and the Anglican debate, 1800–1860, Cambridge University Press, 1988).

Corsi also explored in detail the complex relationship between Darwin and broadly transformist French doctrines; he emphasised the role of Charles Lyell in shaping Darwin's attitudes, and in informing British naturalists and the cultivated public on the state of scientific affairs across the Channel. A period of research at King' College Cambridge (1981–1982) allowed Corsi to examine selected features of the relationship between the physical and the social sciences during the decades 1810–1840, with particular reference to debates on the epistemological foundations of the new science of political economy ("The Heritage of Dugald Stewart: Oxford Philosophy and the Method of Political Economy, 1809–1832", 1987).

Corsi's research on Italian science during the nineteenth century was firstly published in an article of 1983, followed by a wide-ranging project on Italian geology from the early 1800s to the early 2000s. Prompted by Lyell's comments on Italian geology, Corsi has tackled the problem of why Italy is the only country in the Western World that does not possess an exhaustive geological map, in spite of the dangerous structural instability of much of the national territory. Elements of an answer were provided in entries for the Dizionario Biografico degli Italiani devoted to figures such as Igino Cocchi, Carlo de Stefani or Felice Giordano; a first synthesis was offered in 2007 in the article "Much Ado about Nothing. The Italian Geological Survey, 1861–2001" that appeared in Earth Sciences History.

In 1991, thanks to the suggestion of colleagues and librarians at the Department of Earth Sciences, The University of Pisa, Corsi recovered a major collection of letters addressed to Giuseppe Meneghini, Professor of Geology from 1849 to 1889. Together with the Paolo Savi fund, the geological archives at Pisa are amongst the most impressive in Italy. In 2008, Corsi published a small albeit significant selection of the Meneghini correspondence, covering the years 1853–1857, and monitoring the personal contacts the Pisa geologists entertained with colleagues in France, England and the German States (Fossils and reputations, 2008). The letters (relevant excerpts in English are reproduce in the long introduction) are a precious guide to the complex negotiations of authority and reputations within the European earth sciences of the middle of the 19th century.

Latterly, Corsi has explored the transition from the Eighteenth to the Nineteenth century within debates on life and its history; particular reference is placed on the acrimonious and politically charged denunciations of materialism and atheism that forced many naturalists and commentators to adopt defensive strategies and to distance themselves from unsavoury doctrines. This did not prevent the persistence of 18th-century themes well into the mid-decades of the 19th century.

== Main publications ==
- Corsi, Pietro (2016). "What Do You Mean by A Periodical? Forms and Functions". Notes and Records of the Royal Society. 70 (4): 235–241 pp. doi:10.1098/rsnr.2016.0028. PMC 5095354. PMID 30124253.
- Corsi, Pietro (2014). L'evoluzionismo prima di Darwin: Baden Powell e il dibattito anglicano, 1800–1860. Brescia: Morcelliana. ISBN 978-88-372-2736-4.
- Corsi, Pietro (2012). Idola Tribus: Lamarck, Politics and Religion in the Early Nineteenth Century. A. Fasolo ed. Milan: Springer-Verlag Italia. pp. 11–36 pp.
- Corsi, Pietro (2011). "The Revolutions of Evolution: Geoffroy and Lamarck, 1825–1840". Bulletin du Musée d'Anthropologie préhistorique de Monaco. 51: 97–122 pp.
- Corsi, Pietro (2008). Fossils and reputations: a scientific correspondence, Pisa, Paris, London 1854–1857. Pisa: Edizioni Plus. ISBN 978-88-849-2564-0.
- Corsi, Pietro (2008). Lamarck: Sprongen in de evolutie. Amsterdam: Natuurwetenschap & Techniek. ISBN 978-90-76988-99-3.
- Corsi, Pietro (2007). "Much ado about nothing: The Italian Geological Survey, 1861–2006". Earth Sciences History. 26 (1): 97–125 pp. doi:10.17704/eshi.26.1.kq2w1707l43w151x. hdl:11580/56479. S2CID 140728390.
- Corsi, Pietro (2001). Lamarck : genèse et enjeux du transformisme : 1770–1830. Paris: CNRS. ISBN 22-710-5701-9.
- Corsi, Pietro (2000). Lamarck: il mondo naturale si affaccia all'evoluzione. Vol. 3.
- Corsi, Pietro (1991). The Enchanted Loom. Chapters in the History of Science. Oxford: Oxford University Press. ISBN 978-0-521-79462-6.
- Corsi, Pietro (1988). The age of Lamarck : evolutionary theories in France, 1790–1830. Berkeley: University of California Press. ISBN 05-200-5830-5.
- Corsi, Pietro (1988). Science and religion: Baden Powell and the Anglican debate, 1800–1860. Cambridge: Cambridge University Press. ISBN 05-212-4245-2.
- Corsi, Pietro (1987). "The Heritage of Dugald Stewart: Oxford Philosophy and the Method of Political Economy, 1809–1832" (PDF). Nuncius: Annali di Storia della Scienza. 2 (2): 89–144 pp. doi:10.1163/182539187x00042.
- Corsi, Pietro (1983). Oltre il mito : Lamarck e le scienze naturali del suo tempo. Bologna: Il Mulino. ISBN 88-150-0271-5.

== Websites ==
- "Œuvres et rayonnement de Jean-Baptiste Lamarck". Archived from the original on June 26, 2007.
- "Les oeuvres de Lavoisier".
- "HistMap : réseau européen pour l'histoire des cartes géologiques". Archived from the original on August 6, 2016.
- "Buffon et l'histoire naturelle : l'édition en ligne".
