= Annals of Science =

- Discipline: History of science and technology
- Language: English
- Edited by: Robert Iliffe; David Miller

Publication details
- History: 1936-present
- Publisher: Taylor & Francis
- Frequency: Quarterly
- Impact factor: 0.541 (2012)

Standard abbreviations
- ISO 4: Ann. Sci.
- MathSciNet: Ann. of Sci.

Indexing
- CODEN: ANNSA8
- ISSN: 0003-3790 (print); 1464-505X (web)
- LCCN: 37037975
- OCLC no.: 01481407

Links
- Journal homepage; Online access; Online archive

Annals of Science is a peer-reviewed academic journal covering the history of science and technology. It is published by Taylor & Francis and was established in 1936. The founding editor-in-chief was the Canadian historian of science Harcourt Brown.

== History ==
The journal was established after Brown visited Britain for a year and discussed where he could publish work on the history of science with Henry Robinson of the library of the Royal Society of London. They decided that aside from the Belgian Isis, there were few outlets for such work, and so founded the Annals of Science with Douglas McKie (University College London), who was the main editor. The aim was to publish faster than Isis and with a focus on the modern period. The editors chose to have a bright orange cover to make it stand out against the usual blue or grey of periodicals at the time.

Around the time of World War II, only three volumes were published over a period of 12 years. From 1956 to 1958, the Bulletin of the British Society for the History of Science was published as part of the Annals of Science. In 1974, then editor Ivor Grattan-Guinness moved the journal from 4 to 6 issues per year; 100 issues were published from 1936 to 1969 and a further hundred by 1986. Grattan-Guinness also redesigned the cover and changed the tagline from "The History of Science and Technology since the Renaissance" to "The History of Science and Technology from the Thirteenth Century".

== Reception ==
David M. Knight has said that "The major event of the first phase of the development of British journals [of the history of science] is the founding of Annals of Science in 1936." Gordon L. Miller called it a "respected scholarly journal". A review in Astrophysical Journal from the year of the launch noted approvingly that the policy of studying the history of science from the renaissance was "liberally interpreted" to accept papers studying earlier periods.

== Editors ==
Robinson was an editor until 1960 and McKie until 1967. Subsequent editors were:

- Niels Hugh de Vaudrey Heathcote (1952–1974)
- W.A. Smeaton (1960–1965)
- F.W. Gibbs (1961–1965)
- Trevor I. Williams (1966-?)
- R.E.W Maddison (1966-?)
- Harold J. Sharlin (1969-)
- Hans Kangro (1969-)
- Ivor Grattan-Guinness (1974–81, book review editor until 1987)
- G.L.E. Turner (1981-?),
- Trevor Levere (1999–2014)
- Robert Iliffe (2011–present) and David Miller (2014–present).

Grattan-Guinness described his experience in taking on the editorship in an article in the journal in 2010. He had published a biographical article on Georg Cantor in the journal in 1971 and met the-then editor, Heathcote, during the process of publication. Heathcote was overloaded with work — "the journal seemed never to reject anything" — and he invited Grattan-Guinness to join the editorial board. He joined the board and met with the publishers in June 1974, when he told John Cheney, the house editor, that "the journal had acquired a poor reputation in recent years", which surprised Cheney. That same afternoon Cheney rang Heathcote only to find that he was in the process of writing his resignation letter recommending Grattan-Guinness as his successor — the younger man was immediately offered the post of editor. Taylor & Francis would otherwise have closed the journal.

== Abstracting and indexing ==
Annals of Science is abstracted and indexed in:

- America: History and Life
- Astrophysics Data System
- British Humanities Index
- CSA Technology Research Database (METADEX, Engineered Materials Abstracts, Mechanical Engineering Abstracts, Civil Engineering Abstracts, Solid State and Superconductivity Abstracts, Computer and Information Systems Abstracts, Electronics and Communications Abstracts
- Current Index to Statistics
- EBSCO Databases
- European Index for the Humanities
- Historical Abstracts
- History of Science, Technology and Medicine Database
- Isis Current Bibliography of the History of Science
- International Bibliography of Periodical Literature (Art, Humanities, and Social Sciences)
- Science Citation Index Expanded
- Social Sciences Citation Index
- Mathematical Reviews and MathSciNet
- Scopus
- Zentralblatt MATH/Mathematics Abstracts

According to the Journal Citation Reports, the journal has a 2010 impact factor of 0.222.

== See also ==
- List of history of science and technology journals and periodicals
