= BJHS =

BJHS may refer to:

- The British Journal for the History of Science, a quarterly journal
- Bob Jones High School, a high school in Madison, Alabama
- Benign joint hypermobility syndrome
