= Trevor H. Levere =

Canadian historian (1944–2022)

Trevor Harvey Levere
- Born: March 21, 1944; London, England
- Died: November 1, 2022 (aged 78); Toronto, Ontario
- Citizenship: United Kingdom; Canada
- Education: University of Oxford (B.A. 1966, Ph.D. 1969)
- Scientific career
- Fields: history of science
- Workplaces: University of Toronto
- Thesis: Chemical Affinity in the Nineteenth Century
- Doctoral advisor: Alistair Cameron Crombie

Trevor Harvey Levere FRSC (1944–2022) was an English-born, Canadian historian of science, specializing in the history of chemistry. He was the author of six books and the coauthor of three books.

== Biography ==
After graduating from St Paul's School, London, Levere matriculated in 1962 at the University of Oxford. As an undergraduate, he enjoyed reading about the history of science as presented in the work of Herbert Butterfield, Henry Leicester, and Thomas Kuhn. Levere received his B.A. in chemistry in 1966. His Part II B.A. thesis on an historical topic in chemistry eventually appeared as a chapter in the 1969 book Martinus van Marum. Life and Work, edited by R. J. Forbes. At Oxford, Levered graduated in 1969 with a Ph.D. in the history of science. His thesis supervisor was A. C. Crombie. Levere's Ph.D. thesis, published in 1971 with the title Affinity and Matter: Elements of Chemical Philosophy 1800–1865, remains an important reference for historians of chemistry.

At the Institute for the History and Philosophy of Science and Technology (IHPST) and the Department of History of the University of Toronto, Levere was employed as Lecturer from 1968 to 1969, Assistant Professor from 1969 to 1974, Associate Professor from 1974 to 1981, Professor from 1981 to 2006, and University Professor from 2006 to 2007, when he retired as University Professor Emeritus. He helped to develop the IHPST (founded in 1967) into an internationally important organization and served as the IHPST's director from 1981 to 1986 and again from 1993 to 1998. In addition to the history of chemistry, Levere did research on the relation between science and Romanticism, the history of science in Canada, and the history of arctic exploration. He published more than 80 refereed articles or book chapters. His book Transforming Matter: A History of Chemistry from Alchemy to the Buckyball (2001, Johns Hopkins University Press) was written for chemistry students and teachers interested in the history of chemistry, as well as anyone else interested in the history of chemistry. The book was translated into Japanese and published in 2007 with the support of the Japanese Society for the History of Chemistry. Transforming Matter is noteworthy for its "readable style" and, according to David M. Knight, is "amazingly full of information."

Levere was the editor or co-editor of several books. He served in various editorial capacities for several journals — most notably at the editor from 1999 to 2013 of the journal Annals of Science. He held Visiting Fellowships in France (1981, Centre national de recherché scientifique, Paris), in the UK (1983, Clare Hall, Cambridge); in the USA (1995, Dibner Institute for the History of Science and Technology, MIT); and in Spain (2006, Pompeu Fabra University, Barcelona). He also held short-term fellowships in Japan (2004, Japan Society for the Promotion of Science) and in Germany (2006 & 2007, University of Göttingen).

Trevor Levere married Jennifer Tiesing on the 30th of July 1966. Upon his death in 2022, he was survived by his widow Jennifer, their son and daughter, and five grandchildren.

== Awards and honours ==
Levere was a Killam Senior Research Fellow from 1975 to 1977. He was elected in 1976 a Foreign Member of the Koninklijke Hollandsche Maatschappij der Wetenschappen (Royal Holland Society of Sciences and Humanities), in 1980 a Fellow of the Royal Society of Canada, and in 1997 a membre effectiv of the Académie Internationale d'Histoire des Sciences (International Academy of the History of Science). He was a Guggenheim Fellow for the academic year 1983–1984. In 1985 he was elected a Fellow of the Royal Geographical Society. In 1999 He was awarded a D.Litt. as an honoris causa by the University of Oxford. He received in 2009 the Sydney M. Edelstein Award (now named the HIST Award for Outstanding Achievement in the History of Chemistry). In 2017 a festschrift was published in Levere's honour.

== Selected publications ==
=== Articles ===
- Levere, T. H. (1968). "Faraday, Matter, and Natural Theology—Reflections on an Unpublished Manuscript". The British Journal for the History of Science. 4 (2): 95–107. doi:10.1017/S0007087400003435. (See Michael Faraday.)
- Levere, Trevor H. (1970). "Affinity or Structure: An Early Problem in Organic Chemistry". Ambix. 17 (2): 111–126. doi:10.1179/amb.1970.17.2.111.
- Levere, T. H. (1977). "Dr Thomas Beddoes and the establishment of his Pneumatic Institution: A tale of three Presidents". Notes and Records of the Royal Society of London. 32 (1): 41–49. doi:10.1098/rsnr.1977.0005. PMID 11615622. (See Thomas Beddoes.)
- Levere, Trevor H. (1977). "Coleridge, Chemistry, and the Philosophy of Nature". Studies in Romanticism. 16 (3): 349–379. doi:10.2307/25600090. JSTOR 25600090. (See Samuel Taylor Coleridge.)
- Levere, Trevor H. (1977). "The Rich Economy of Nature: Chemistry in the Nineteenth Century". Nature and the Victorian Imagination. pp. 189–200. doi:10.1525/9780520340152-013. ISBN 978-0-520-34015-2.
- Levere, Trevor (1978). "S. T. Coleridge: A poet's view of science". Annals of Science. 35: 33–44. doi:10.1080/00033797800200121.
- Levere, Trevor H. (1981). "Dr. Thomas Beddoes at Oxford: Radical Politics in 1788–1793 and the Fate of the Regius Chair in Chemistry". Ambix. 28 (2): 61–69. doi:10.1179/amb.1981.28.2.61. PMID 11615866.
- Levere, Trevor H. (1982). "Dr Thomas Beddoes the Interaction of Pneumatic and Preventive Medicine with Chemistry". Interdisciplinary Science Reviews. 7 (2): 137–147. Bibcode:1982ISRv....7..137L. doi:10.1179/030801882789801151. PMID 11617221.
- Levere, Trevor H. (1984). "Dr. Thomas Beddoes (1750–1808): Science and medicine in politics and society". The British Journal for the History of Science. 17 (2): 187–204. doi:10.1017/S0007087400020914. PMID 11615967.
- Levere, Trevor H. (1988). "The History of Science of Canada". The British Journal for the History of Science. 21 (4): 419–425. doi:10.1017/S0007087400025334. PMID 11621688.
- Levere, Trevor H. (1990). "Lavoisier: Language, Instruments, and the Chemical Revolution". Nature, Experiment, and the Sciences. Boston Studies in the Philosophy of Science. Vol. 120. pp. 207–223. doi:10.1007/978-94-009-1878-8_9. ISBN 978-94-010-7338-7.
- Levere, Trevor H. (2000). "Measuring Gases and Measuring Goodness". Instruments and Experimentation in the History of Chemistry. pp. 105–136. doi:10.7551/mitpress/3818.003.0009. ISBN 978-0-262-27559-0.
- Levere, Trevor H. (2002). "Addicted to Experimental Philosophy: The Works of Robert Boyle". Canadian Journal of History. 37: 75–82. doi:10.3138/cjh.37.1.75. (See Robert Boyle.)
- Levere, Trevor H. (2006). "What History Can Teach Us About Science: Theory and Experiment, Data and Evidence". Interchange. 37 (1–2): 115–128. doi:10.1007/s10780-006-8403-3.
- Levere, Trevor H. (2007). "Dr. Thomas Beddoes (1760–1808): Chemistry, Medicine, and Books in the French and Chemical Revolutions". New Narratives in Eighteenth-Century Chemistry. Archimedes. Vol. 18. pp. 157–176. doi:10.1007/978-1-4020-6278-0_8. ISBN 978-1-4020-6273-5.
- Miller, David Philip; Levere, Trevor H. (2008). ""Inhale it and See?" the Collaboration between Thomas Beddoes and James Watt in Pneumatic Medicine". Ambix. 55 (1): 5–28. doi:10.1179/174582313X13789813148869. PMID 18831152.
- Levere, Trevor H. (2009). "Dr Thomas Beddoes: Chemistry, medicine, and the perils of democracy". Notes and Records of the Royal Society. 63 (3): 215–229. doi:10.1098/rsnr.2009.0032. PMID 20027744.
- Levere, Trevor H. (2009). "The Most Select and the Most Democratic: A Century of Science in the Royal Society of Canada". Scientia Canadensis. 20: 3–99. doi:10.7202/800397ar. PMID 11619927.
- Levere, Trevor H. (2016). "Chemistry, consumption, and reform". The Enlightenment of Thomas Beddoes. pp. 26–94. doi:10.4324/9781315411934-9. ISBN 978-1-315-41193-4.

=== Books ===
- Levere, Trevor H. (1971). Affinity and matter: elements of chemical philosophy, 1800-1865. Oxford: Clarendon Press.
  - 2nd edition. Yverdon, Switzerland; Langhorne, Pennsylvania: Gordon and Breach Science Publishers. 1993. ISBN 2881245838. LCCN 92045001.
- Turner, Gerard L'Estrange; Levere, T. H. (1973). Martinus van Marum. Life and Work: Van Marum's Scientific Instruments in Teyler's Museum. Vol. 4. Leyden: Noordhoff International Publishing. ISBN 9060920031. (See Martinus van Marum.)
- Levere, Trevor H.; Jarrell, Richard A., eds. (1974). Curious field-book; science & society in Canadian history. Toronto: Oxford University Press. ISBN 0195402219. LCCN 74181548.
- Levere, Trevor H. (8 August 2002). Poetry Realized in Nature: Samuel Taylor Coleridge and Early Nineteenth-Century Science. Cambridge University Press. ISBN 978-0-521-52490-2. 1st edition. 1981.
- Levere, Trevor H., ed. (1982). Editing texts in the history of science and medicine: papers given at the seventeenth annual Conference on Editorial Problems, University of Toronto, 6-7 November 1981. New York: Garland Publishing. ISBN 082402432X. LCCN 82015800.
- Levere, Trevor H.; Shea, William R., eds. (1990). Nature, experiment, and the sciences: essays on Galileo and the history of science in honour of Stillman Drake. Boston Studies in the Philosophy of Science, Volume 120. Dordrecht; Boston: Kluwer Academic Publishers. ISBN 978-94-010-7338-7. (See Stillman Drake.)
  - 2012 pbk edition. Springer. 6 December 2012. ISBN 978-9400918795.
- Levere, Trevor H. (1993). Science and the Canadian Arctic: a century of exploration, 1818-1918. Cambridge University Press. ISBN 0521419336. LCCN 92012570. pbk reprint 2002.
- Levere, Trevor H. (1994). Chemists and chemistry in nature and society, 1770-1878. Aldershot, Hampshire, Great Britain; Brookfield, Vermont: Variorum. ISBN 0860784126. LCCN 94003122.
- Levere, Trevor H. (1998). Research and Influence: A Century of Science in the Royal Society of Canada. Royal Society of Canada. ISBN 0920064655; 99 pages
- Essays on Galileo and the History and Philosophy of Science by Stillman Drake. University of Toronto Press. 1999; 3 vols.; selected and introduced by N. M. Swerdlow and T. H. Levere; vol. 3
- Holmes, Frederic L.; Levere, Trevor H., eds. (2000). Instruments and experimentation in the history of chemistry. Cambridge, Massachusetts: MIT Press. ISBN 0-262-08282-9. LCCN 99021064.
- Levere, Trevor H. (3 August 2001). Transforming Matter: A History of Chemistry from Alchemy to the Buckyball. Johns Hopkins Introductory Studies in the History of Science. Johns Hopkins University Press. ISBN 978-0-8018-6610-4. LCCN 00011487; x+215 pages
- Levere, Trevor Harvey; Turner, Gerard L'Estrange; Golinski, Jan; Stewart, Larry R. (2002). Discussing Chemistry and Steam: The Minutes of a Coffee House Philosophical Society, 1780-1787. Oxford University Press. ISBN 978-0-19-851530-2. LCCN 2002510571.
- Levere, Trevor; Stewart, Larry; Torrens, Hugh; Wachelder, Joseph (10 November 2016). The Enlightenment of Thomas Beddoes: Science, medicine, and reform. Routledge. ISBN 978-1-315-41191-0.
- Levere, T. H., ed. (2019). The Arctic Journal of Captain Henry Wemyss Feilden, R.A., The Naturalist on H.M.S. Alert 1875-1876. London: Routledge (for the Hakluyt Society.
