= British Society for the History of Science =

Learned society devoted to the history of science, technology, and medicine

- Abbreviation: BSHS
- Formation: 1947
- Website: bshs.org.uk

The British Society for the History of Science (BSHS) was founded in 1947 by Francis Butler, Joan Eyles and Victor Eyles.

== Overview ==
It is Britain's largest learned society devoted to the history of science, technology, and medicine. The society's aim is to bring together people with interests in all aspects of the field, and to publicise relevant ideas within the wider research and teaching communities and the media. Its mission statement states the society will strive "to foster the understanding of the history and social impact of science, technology and medicine in all their branches in the academic and the wider communities, and to provide a national focus for the discipline."

Publications are a key feature of the society's professional activity. Print publications include:

- The British Journal for the History of Science (BJHS): a peer-reviewed quarterly academic journal, including articles and reviews of the latest books in the history of science, technology and medicine
- BJHS Themes: a peer-reviewed open access academic journal, an annual themed collection of articles
- Viewpoint: magazine of the society, published three times a year and featuring news and views from across the field
- BSHS Monographs: work of lasting scholarly value that might not otherwise be made available, and aids the dissemination of innovative projects advancing scholarship or education in the field

Other publications are online, including the BSHS List of Theses, and the BSHS Guide to Institutions.

The society also awards several prizes:

- The Singer Prize, awarded every two years for an unpublished research essay by new scholars
- The BSHS Hughes Prize, awarded every two years to the best history of science book written for a popular audience
- The BSHS Slade Prize, awarded between 1999 and 2009 for studies of conceptual innovation or scientific methodology
- The BSHS John Pickstone Prize, awarded every two years to the best scholarly history of science book written in English

== Presidents ==
Presidents from the Society's founding up to 1997 are reported by Janet Browne in a British Journal for the History of Science article.

- 1946–48 Charles Joseph Singer
- 1949–51 J. R. Partington
- 1951–53 Frank Sherwood Taylor
- 1953–55 H. Hamshaw Thomas
- 1955–57 Herbert Dingle
- 1957–62 E. Ashworth Underwood
- 1962–64 Thomas Martin
- 1964–66 Alistair Cameron Crombie
- 1966–68 Alfred Rupert Hall
- 1968–70 G. J. Whitrow
- 1970–72 W. P. D. Wightman
- 1972–74 John Anthony Chaldecott
- 1974–76 Maurice P. Crosland
- 1976–78 D. W. Waters
- 1978–80 William Hodson Brock
- 1980–82 Robert Fox (historian)
- 1982–84 Jack B. Morrell
- 1984–86 Gerard L'Estrange Turner
- 1986–88 Colin A. Russell
- 1988–90 Robert G. W. Anderson
- 1990–92 Hugh S. Torrens
- 1992–94 Geoffrey Cantor
- 1994–96 D. M. Knight
- 1996–98 John Hedley Brooke
- 1998–2000 Ludmilla Jordanova
- 2000–01 James Arthur Bennett
- 2002–03 Janet Browne
- 2004–06 Peter Bowler
- 2006–08 Frank James
- 2008–09 Jeff Hughes
- 2010–12 Sally Horrocks
- 2012–14 Hasok Chang
- 2014‒16 Gregory Radick
- 2016–18 Patricia Fara
- 2018–20 Tim Boon
- 2020–22 Charlotte Sleigh
- 2022–24 James A. Secord
- 2024–26 Chiara Ambrosio
- 2026– present Rebekah Higgitt

== Wikipedia ==
The society hosted an editathon at their annual conference in July 2015 at Swansea, which included wiki–skills training, and which resulted in better content on British scientists on Wikipedia.
