= Victor Eyles =

British geologist & science historian (1895–1978)

Dr Victor Ambrose Eyles FRSE FGS (1895–1978) was a British geologist and science historian. He was the founder of the Society for the Bibliography of Natural History in 1936. Joan Eyles, his wife, donated the Eyles Collection, their collection of papers on the history and practice of geology, to the University of Bristol.

== Life ==
Eyles was born in Bristol on 10 October 1895 the son of Willam Henry Eyles (in 1928 Lord Mayor of Bristol). He attended Fairfield School, then enrolled in Bristol University, but his studies were interrupted by the war.

In the First World War he served in the Gas Brigade within the Royal Engineers, and was wounded on active duty in France in 1916. Upon recovery he rejoined in a new regiment: the Royal Flying Corps where he served as an Observer in the Kite Balloon section until 1919. He returned to Bristol and graduated BSc in the summer of 1920.

He then joined the Geological Survey of Britain as a professional Geologist. He moved to Edinburgh in 1935. In 1939 he was elected a Fellow of the Royal Society of Edinburgh. His proposers were Murray Macgregor, William Thomas Gordon, Edward Battersby Bailey, John Baird Simpson, and David Haldane. He won the Sopciety’s Bruce-Preller Prize in 1961.

In the Second World War he was sent to Northern Ireland to assess bauxite deposits in relation to military needs.

In 1945 he became District Geologist. In 1947 he was a co-founder of the British Society for the History of Science (BSHS). He retired in 1955 and moved to the Cotswolds firstly to Milton-under-Wychwood then in 1962 to Great Rissington.

In 1955 he was awarded an honorary doctorate (DSc) by Bristol University.

He died on 8 March 1978 following a short illness.

== Publications ==
- The Economic Geology of the Ayrshire Coalfields (1930)
- The Geology of Central Ayrshire (1949)
- System of the Earth 1785 (1970) co-author with James Hutton and G W White

== Family ==
In October 1931 he married fellow geologist Joan Mary Briggs (1907–1986). Joan was an expert on William Smith, a founding father of geology. On her death she bequeathed a huge collection of books, papers, and maps relating to geology to the University of Bristol, thereafter called the Eyles Collection.
