= David Philip Miller =

Historian of science

David Philip Miller FRHistS FAHA is a social historian of science. He is Emeritus Professor of History and Philosophy of Science in the School of Humanities and Languages at the University of New South Wales, Australia.

== Career ==
Miller studied chemistry and nuclear physics as well as science and technology policy for a BSc (Hons) at Manchester University and received his MA and PhD in history and sociology of science from the University of Pennsylvania. He has taught at the University of New South Wales since 1981.

He is a fellow of the Royal Historical Society, the Australian Academy of the Humanities and a corresponding member of the International Academy of the History of Science. He serves on editorial boards of the journals Isis, Annals of Science, History of Science and The British Journal for the History of Science.

== Major publications ==
- The Life and Legend of James Watt: Collaboration, Natural Philosophy, and the Improvement of the Steam Engine (University of Pittsburgh Press, 2019, ISBN 0-82294-558-4).
- James Watt, Chemist: Understanding the Origins of the Steam Age (Pickering & Chatto, 2009, ISBN 1-85196-974-8)
- Discovering Water: James Watt, Henry Cavendish and the Nineteenth-Century 'Water Controversy' (Ashgate, 2004, ISBN 0-7546-3177-X).
- Visions of Empire: Voyages, Botany, and Representations of Nature (edited with Peter Hanns Reill), (Cambridge University Press, 1996, ISBN 0-521-48303-4).
