= Colin A. Russell =

English academic

Colin Archibald Russell (July 9, 1928 – May 17, 2013) was a professor of the history of science and technology at the Open University and a research scholar affiliated with the History and philosophy of science department of Cambridge University. His chief research interests were in the fields of the history of chemistry, environmental history and history of science and religion.

== Early life and teaching ==
Born in London, Russell received his education at Epsom Grammar School before going to University College Hull (now the University of Hull). After receiving his BSc he became assistant lecturer in chemistry at the Kingston Technical College (1950–1959) and then lecturer, senior lecturer and principal lecturer in organic chemistry at Harris College, Preston (now the University of Central Lancashire).

Whilst teaching he also undertook further study. He received his MSc (1958) and PhD (1962) in the history and philosophy of science from the University of London. In 1978 he also received a DSc.

== Open University ==
In 1970 Russell founded the Department for the History of Science and Technology at the Open University. Russell remained at the Open University for the rest of his academic career.

== Recognition and awards ==
Russell was the recipient of the Dexter Award from the American Chemical Society ‘for outstanding contributions to the history of chemistry’ (1990) and of the David Mellor Medal from the University of New South Wales (1995).

Russell was a Fellow of the Royal Society of Chemistry on whose council he served from 1999 to 2002 as well as serving as chair to the Royal Society of Chemistry Historical Group. Russell also served as president of the British Society for the History of Science (1986-1988).

Russell had also served as the president for Christians in Science, vice-president of the Universities and Colleges Christian Fellowship, a trustee for the John Ray Initiative as well as a founding member of the International Society for Science and Religion.

== Selected publications ==
During his lifetime he published several hundred reviews, articles and book chapters as well as a number of book. These include:

=== Books ===
- The History of Valency (1971)
- Science and Religious Belief: A Selection of Recent Historical Studies (1973)
- Science and Social Change in Britain and Europe, 1700-1900 (1984)
- Lancastrian Chemist: The Early Years of Sir Edward Frankland (1986)
- Cross-Currents: Interactions between Science and Faith (1985), InterVarsity Press (UK)
- The Rise of Scientific Europe, 1500-1800 (ed. with D. C. Goodman, 1991)
- The Earth, Humanity and God (1994)
- Edward Frankland: Chemistry, Controversy and Conspiracy in Victorian England (Cambridge: Cambridge University Press, 1996)
- Michael Faraday: Physics and Faith (2000)
- Chemistry, Society and Environment: A New History of the British Chemical Industry (2000)

=== Articles and book contributions ===
- 'Chemical techniques in a pre-electronic age: the remarkable apparatus of Edward Frankland' in Instruments and Experimentation in the History of Chemistry, ed. F.L. Holmes and T.H. Levere (Boston: MIT Press, 2000), pp. 311–334.
- 'Conflict of science and religion' and 'Views of nature' in History of Science and Religion: An Encyclopedia, ed. G. Ferngren (New York: Garland, 2000), pp. 12–16 and 38-44.
- 'Chemistry in society' in The New Chemistry, ed. Nina Hall (Cambridge: Cambridge University Press, 2000), pp. 465–484.
- 'Where science and history meet: some fresh challenges to the Christian faith?', Faith & Thought Bulletin, vol. 29 (2001), pp. 7–20
- Chemistry, society and environment: a new history of the British Chemical Industry, (ed. and senior author), (Cambridge: Royal Society of Chemistry, 2000).
