= Joan Eyles =

British geologist, book collector and historian of science

- Born: 15 June 1907
- Died: 14 June 1986 (aged 78)
- Known for: Eyles Collection
- Spouse: Victor Eyles

Academic background
- Education: University College of South Wales and Monmouthshire

Academic work
- Discipline: geology history of science
- Main interests: William Smith

Joan Mary Eyles (15 June 1907 – 14 June 1986, née Biggs) was a British geologist and historian of science, who was an expert on the geologist William Smith. Eyles donated the Eyles Collection of papers on the history and practice of geology to the University of Bristol. She was one of the founding members of the British Society for the History of Science.

== Early life ==
Joan Mary Biggs was born on 15 June 1907, in Neath. She grew up in Bridgend and attended St Winefride's Convent school in Swansea.

== Education ==
Biggs studied chemistry and geology at University College of South Wales and Monmouthshire from 1924 and graduated in 1928.

Biggs enrolled on a PhD at King's College London to study Scottish igneous rocks. One year later, she met Victor Eyles, whom she married after three months. Joan Eyles, as she then became, completed her research but did not take her viva because of "domestic pressures" and the need to travel frequently to follow her husband as he worked as a field geologist for the H.M. Geological Survey.

== Collecting and research ==
Eyles developed a keen interest in the history of geology and began to collect books and maps. After the war, Eyles contributed centenary noteices of geologists to Nature.

Eyles and her husband were founder members of the British Society for the History of Science in May 1947.

Eyles conducted "meticulous" research on William Smith.

Eyles became a member of the History of Earth Sciences Society and the Society for the History of Natural History.

== Legacy ==
Eyles donated her and her husband's book collection to the University of Bristol.
