= Alistair Cameron Crombie =

Australian zoologist and historian of science (1915–1996)

- Born: 4 November 1915; Brisbane, Australia
- Died: 9 February 1996 (aged 80)
- Occupations: Zoologist, science historian
- Spouse: Nancy Hey
- Children: 5

Alistair Cameron Crombie (4 November 1915 – 9 February 1996) was an Australian historian of science who began his career as a zoologist. He was noted for his contributions to research on competition between species before turning to history.

== Early life and education ==
Born in Brisbane, Australia, Crombie was educated at the Church of England Grammar School and Geelong Grammar School. He then undertook tertiary study in Science at the University of Melbourne, where he was a resident from 1935 at Trinity College. During his studies in Melbourne, he won the First Brunning Prize in Botany Part I (1935) and the Exhibition in Zoology Part III (1937).

Crombie undertook postgraduate study at Jesus College, Cambridge, receiving his doctorate in 1942 in the area of population dynamics. He married Nancy Hey in 1943 and had five children. He undertook research at the Cambridge Zoological Laboratory for the British Ministry of Agriculture and Fisheries from 1941 until he was appointed as lecturer at University College London in 1946. Involved in the establishment of the British Society for the History of Science in 1947 (and later its President from 1964 to 1968), he was an early editor of the British Journal for the Philosophy of Science. Following the publication in 1952 of his textbook Augustine to Galileo: The History of Science A.D. 400–1650, in 1953 Crombie was selected to establish the teaching of History of Science subjects at Oxford, and after a year as visiting professor at the University of Washington, Seattle, he took up his lectureship at Oxford in 1954. During Crombie's tenure at Oxford, the history of science was added to the graduate level offerings of Oxford's history faculty.

== Career ==
Crombie was one of the founders of the review journal History of Science in 1962, and was awarded the Galileo Prize by the Domus Galileana in Pisa in 1964. Crombie served as President of the Académie Internationale d’Histoire des Sciences from 1968 to 1971. He became a fellow at Trinity College, Oxford, in 1970, but was passed over for the Chair in history of science when it was created at Oxford in 1971. He retired in 1983 and took up a half-time appointment as Kennedy Professor in the Renaissance at Smith College, Massachusetts, and was Professor of History of Science and Medicine there from 1983 to 1985. He also held many visiting professorships in France, Germany and Japan. He was made a Senior Fellow of the British Academy in 1990 and was also made a member of the Pontifical Academy of Sciences (1994) and the Academia Leopoldina in Halle, Germany. He received the Forschungspreis (Research Award) of the Alexander von Humboldt Foundation, honorary doctorates from Durham (1978), Paris, X-Nanterre and Sassari, and the European Premio Dondi (1995).

During his career as a historian of science, Crombie identified thematic threads or "styles" in the development of European approaches to science. He published his ideas in 1994 in a definitive 3-volume work, entitled, Styles of Scientific Thinking in the European Tradition: The History of Argument and Explanation especially in the Mathematical and Biomedical Sciences and Arts. The main argument about six distinct styles of scientific thinking in the history of Western science was also published in the brief 1995 article Commitments and Styles of European Scientific Thinking. Crombie's analysis of the six styles was taken up by philosopher of science Ian Hacking, who further developed this perspective. During Crombie's tenure he supervised several students, including Robert Fox (Professor of the History of Science, Oxford University), David M Knight (Professor of the History and Philosophy of Science, Durham University); German E Berrios (Professor of the Epistemology of Psychiatry, University of Cambridge) and Trevor Levere (Professor of the History of Science, University of Toronto).

== Bibliography ==
- Augustine to Galileo: The History of Science A.D. 400 – 1650 (Revised ed.). Penguin. 1969 [1952]. ISBN 0-14-055074-7. (also published under the title: Medieval and Early Modern Science)
- Robert Grosseteste and the Origins of Experimental Science, 1100–1700. Oxford: Clarendon Press. 1953. ISBN 0-19-824189-5.
- Science, Optics and Music in Medieval and Early Modern Thought. London: Hambledon. 1990. ISBN 0-907628-79-6.
- Styles of Scientific Thinking in the European Tradition: The History of Argument and Explanation Especially in the Mathematical and Biomedical Sciences and Arts. London: Gerald Duckworth & Company. 1994. ISBN 0-7156-2439-3.
- Crombie, A. C. (1995). "Commitments and Styles of European Scientific Thinking". History of Science. 33 (2): 225–238. Bibcode:1995HisSc..33..225C. doi:10.1177/007327539503300204. hdl:10810/40210. PMID 11639681. S2CID 6577121.
