= The British Journal for the History of Science =

- Discipline: History of Science
- Language: English
- Edited by: Doctor Amanda Rees

Publication details
- History: 1962–present
- Publisher: Cambridge University Press (UK)
- Frequency: Quarterly
- Impact factor: 0.7 (2023)

Standard abbreviations
- ISO 4: Br. J. Hist. Sci.
- MathSciNet: British J. Hist. Sci.

Indexing
- ISSN: 0007-0874 (print); 1474-001X (web)

Links
- Journal homepage

The British Journal for the History of Science (BJHS) is an international academic journal published quarterly by Cambridge University Press in association with the British Society for the History of Science. It was founded under its present title in 1962 but was preceded by the Bulletin of the British Society for the History of Science which was itself founded in 1949. The journal publishes papers and reviews on the subject of the history of science. The journal is currently edited by Doctor Amanda Rees, who works at the University of York.

According to the Journal Citation Reports, the journal has a 2023 impact factor of 0.7. The journal is abstracted and indexed in Clarivate, Scopus, and ProQuest.

== Previous editors of BJHS ==
Adam Mosley

Amanda Rees (2019–present)

Charlotte Sleigh (2014–2019)

Jon Agar (2009–2014)

Simon Schaffer (2004–2009)

Crosbie Smith (2000–2004)

Janet Browne (1994–2000)

John Hedley Brooke (1989–1994)

David Knight (1982–1989)

Nicholas W. Fisher (1977–1982)

Robert Fox (1971–1977)

Maurice P. Crosland (1966–1971)

H. D. Anthony (1962–1966)

N. H. de V. Heathcote (editor of predecessor journal, Bulletin of the British Society for the History of Science)
