= David Waters (rugby union) =

- Full name: David Ralph Waters
- Born: 4 June 1955 (age 71) Newport, Wales
- Height: 6 ft 7 in (201 cm)

Rugby union career
- Position: Lock
Senior career
Years	Team	Apps	(Points)
1974–96	Newport RFC	702	(165)
International career
Years	Team	Apps	(Points)
1986	Wales	4	(0)

David Ralph Waters (born 4 June 1955) is a Welsh former rugby union international.

Waters, nicknamed "Muddy", was born in Newport and attended Caerleon Comprehensive School. He played as a lock and is the most capped player of all time for Newport RFC, featuring in 702 first-class games over 22 seasons.

Capped four times for Wales, Waters would have debuted in the 1985 Five Nations, having been selected for the matches against France and England, only for bad weather to postpone both fixtures. He was Wales' lock in all four matches of the 1986 Five Nations, with Bob Norster out suspended, but lost his place for the subsequent South Pacific tour.

== See also ==
- List of Wales national rugby union players
