= Jack Morrell (historian of science) =

British historian of science

Jack B. Morrell is a historian of science at the University of Leeds. Between 1964 and 1994 he was lecturer and then Reader in History of Science at the University of Bradford. He has also been a visiting professor at the University of Pennsylvania (1970), a Supernumerary Fellow at Brasenose College, Oxford (1987), and a Leverhulme Emeritus Fellow (1995–97). Between 1978 and 1982 he was vice-president and then president of the British Society for the History of Science. Since 1984 he has been a Fellow of the Royal Historical Society.

He has written five books. He is currently examining the relations between the professionals and amateurs who worked in Yorkshire in the early twentieth century on the geology of the county. His main research interests are

- British Science, 1760–c.1939
- History of Scientific Institutions
- History of Geology

He received the 2007 Sue Tyler Friedman Medal for his work in the history of geology.

== Selected publications ==
- John Phillips and the Business of Victorian Science (Aldershot: Ashgate, 2005).
- 15 articles in the Oxford Dictionary of National Biography (Oxford: OUP, 2004).
- Science at Oxford, 1914–1939: Transforming an Arts University (Oxford: Clarendon Press, 1997).
- Science, Culture and Politics in Britain, 1750–1870 (Aldershot: Ashgate, 1997).
- (ed. with A. W. Thackray) Gentlemen of Science: Early Correspondence of the British Association for the Advancement of Science, Royal Historical Society, Camden Series, vol. 30 (London: Royal Historical Society, 1984).
- (ed. with I. Inkster) Metropolis and Province: Science in British Culture, 1780–1850 (London: Hutchinson, 1983).
- (with A. W. Thackray) Gentlemen of Science: Early Years of the British Association for the Advancement of Science (Oxford: Clarendon Press, 1981).
