= David Watkin Waters =

British naval officer

David Watkins Waters

DP of National Maritime Museum, Greenwich
- In office 1971–1978

Personal details
- Born: 2 August 1911 St. Germans, Cornwall, England, Uk
- Died: 28 November 2012 (aged 101) Christchurch, New Zealand
- Occupation: Naval officer, naval historian

David Watkin Waters RN FSA FRHistS FRIN (2 August 1911 – 28 November 2012) was a British naval officer, historian of navigation, and naval historian, who served as deputy director of the National Maritime Museum, Greenwich, 1971–1978.

== Early life ==
Waters was born in Cornwall in 1931, the second and younger son of a naval engineer-lieutenant in the Royal Navy, David Waters' father was among the 35 officers and 512 men who died when SM U-24 sank the pre-dreadnought battleship HMS Formidable. His widowed mother raised her two boys in a disadvantaged area of Plymouth. His elder brother, William, attended the Royal Naval College, Dartmouth at no cost as a naval orphan. David followed in 1925, becoming known as "Little Willie," a nickname that followed him as "Willie" throughout his life.

== Naval career ==
Illness delayed completion of his education at Dartmouth, but in 1929 he eventually joined the battleship HMS Barham (04) as a cadet. In 1930, he was assigned to the cruiser HMS Berwick (65) serving on the China Station, where he became interested in the Chinese Junk. Returning to Home waters, he was promoted to lieutenant in 1934 in HMS Achilles (70). In 1935, he commenced training as a Fleet Air Arm pilot. Upon completion of his training, he became adjutant of 824 Naval Air Squadron. He returned to the Far East in the aircraft carrier HMS Eagle. During this period, he resumed his study of the Chinese Junk and published several papers on the subject as well as commissioned a local carpenter at Weihaiwei to make scale models. In 1936, the Admiralty Awdred Waters the Admiralty Gold Medal for Naval History. In 1939, he donated two of these models to the National Maritime Museum, Greenwich.

In 1940, he became a flying instructor in the Fairey Swordfish aircraft, based at Toulon, where he was also involved in bombing raids on the Italian coast. The German occupation of France in June forced Waters to evacuate to Algeria and then Malta, where he flew with 830 Naval Air Squadron. Flying from Malta on the night of 13–14 August 1940, he was making a low-level torpedo attack on German shipping at Augusta, Sicily, when he became disoriented after flares went out and crashed his "Stringbag" aircraft into the harbour. Rescued by Italians, he was made a prisoner of war, along with Michael D. Kyrle-Pope, at Poveglia Island, near Venice. With Kyrle-Pope and several others, waters escaped. Caught on a rooftop, where they were planning to steal a boat to take to Yugoslavia, they were taken prisoner and marched to Sulmona, then shipped to Marlag O, the German prisoner of war camp for officers and men of the British and Canadian naval and merchant navies. While in the latter camp from 1942 to 1945, Waters was promoted to lieutenant-commander using books supplied by the Red Cross to teach history.

After the war, he remained in the Royal Navy on flying duty. In 1946, he contemplated doing further study in history and obtained an offer from Balliol College, Oxford, but the Navy declined to send him. Later that year, he was posted to the Admiralty's Naval Historical Branch to assist in writing staff histories of the war.

== Civil service career ==
David Waters retired from active service in the Royal Navy in 1950 and entered the Civil Service to work in the Historical Branch as a specialist in the defence of shipping. Here, he began studies on the general history of Naval convoy from the age of sail to the Second World War and became the principal author for a 1957 staff history on the Second World War, "Defeat of the Enemy Attack upon Shipping," a classified volume that was eventually published thirty years later in 1997. Through a friendship that he developed with the wealthy American sportsman, former wartime naval officer, and book collector, Henry C. Taylor, Waters began his studies of the history of navigation. He published "The Rutters of the Sea" in 1967 and the "Art of Navigation in England and Elizabethan and Early Stuart Times" in 1958, books that Taylor had instigated as well as financially supported, even providing school fees for Waters's new family after David married his brother William's widow, Hope, in 1946.

In 1960, Waters became head of Navigation and Astronomy at the National Maritime Museum. There, he played an important role in converting the Old Royal Observatory, Greenwich into a museum in 1967. He served as secretary of the National Maritime Museum from 1968 to 1971 and then became deputy director from 1971 to 1978. Retiring from the civil Service in 1978 at the age of 67, he held two visiting professorships, a Caird Fellowship at the National Maritime Museum, and a fellowship at the John Carter Brown Library. Waters also had a long-standing involvement with the British Society for the History of Science, serving as its Vice-President from 1972 to 1975 and from 1979 to 1981 and also as its President from 1976 to 1978.

== Publications ==
- The True and Perfecte Newes of the Woorthy and Valiaunt Exploytes, performed and doone by that Valiant Knight Syr Frauncis Drake ... 1587, by Thomas Greepe, Now reproduced in facsimile from the original edition in the private library of Henry C. Taylor ... With an introduction, notes, and a bibliography of English military books by David W. Waters. [With a portrait and maps.] (1958)
- The Art of Navigation in England in Elizabethan and Early Stuart times (1958, 2nd edition 1978).
- The Rutters of the Sea: The Sailing Directions of Pierre Garcie: A study of the first English and French printed sailing directions with facsimile reproductions (1967).
- Science and the techniques of Navigation (1968).
- The Saluki in history, art and sport by Hope Waters. (1968)
- Sir Francis Drake a pictorial biography by Hans P. Kraus, with an historical introduction by David W. Waters & Richard Boulind and a detailed catalogue of the author's collection. (1970).
- The Elizabethan Navy and the Armada of Spain (1975)
- Science and the Techniques of Navigation in the Renaissance (1976; 2nd edition 1980)
- Nautical astronomy and the problem of longitude (1983)
- English navigational books, charts and globes printed down to 1600 (1985)
- Reflections upon some navigational and hydrographic problems of the XVth century related to the voyage of Bartolomeu Dias, 1487-88 (1983)
- The rudder, tiller and whipstaff (1987)
- English maritime books printed before 1801: relating to ships, their construction and their operation at sea: including articles in the Philosophical Transactions of the Royal Society and the Transactions of the American Philosophical Society compiled by Thomas R. Adams and David W. Waters (1995).
- "Defeat of the Enemy Attack upon Shipping, 1939–1945, edited with an introduction by Eric J. Grove. Publications of the Navy Records Society volume 137 (1997).

== Festschrift ==
- P.G.W. Annis, ed., assisted by Jan Allwright, Ingrid and Other Studies: Presented to David W. Waters, FSA, FRHistS, FRIN. Deputy Director of the National Maritime Museum on the Occasion of his Retirement (1978).
