= Notes and Records =

- Discipline: History of science, history of technology, history of medicine
- Language: English
- Edited by: Anita Guerrini

Publication details
- Former names: Notes and Records of the Royal Society
- History: 1938–present
- Publisher: The Royal Society (United Kingdom)
- Frequency: Quarterly
- Open access: Hybrid
- Impact factor: 0.5 (2025)

Standard abbreviations
- ISO 4: Notes Rec.

Indexing
- CODEN: NOREAY
- ISSN: 0035-9149 (print); 1743-0178 (web)
- LCCN: 52028298
- OCLC no.: 614866752

Links
- Journal homepage; Online access; Online archive

Notes and Records: the Royal Society Journal of the History of Science is an international, quarterly peer-reviewed academic journal which publishes original research in the history of science, technology, and medicine. The journal welcomes other forms of contribution including: research notes elucidating recent archival discoveries (in the collections of the Royal Society and elsewhere); news of research projects and online and other resources of interest to historians; book reviews, including essay reviews, on material relating primarily to the history of the Royal Society; recollections or autobiographical accounts written by Fellows and others recording important moments in science from the recent past. It is published by the Royal Society and the editor-in-chief is Anita Guerrini supported by an eminent editorial board.

Notes and Records is fully compliant with the open access requirements of a range of funders including the HEFCE (REF 2020), AHRC, Scottish Funding Council, Wellcome Trust and European Commission. It is designated as "green" on the SHERPA/RoMEO website.

== History ==
The journal was established in 1938 as the Notes and Records of the Royal Society, under the control of Henry Lyons with the help of the assistant secretary of the Royal Society. It obtained its current name, Notes and Records: the Royal Society journal of the history of science in 2014.

== Abstracting and indexing ==
The journal is abstracted and indexed in Scopus, Science Citation Index Expanded, Arts & Humanities Citation Index, Current Contents/Arts & Humanities, Current Mathematical Publications, and MathSciNet. According to the Journal Citation Reports, the journal has a 2024 impact factor of 0.6.

== See also ==
- Notes and Queries
