= David M. Knight =

David Marcus Knight (30 November 1936 – 19 January 2018) was Professor of the History and Philosophy of Science at Durham University.

== Life ==
Knight was born on 30 November 1936 in Exeter, England. The son of the Reverend Marcus Knight, later Dean of Exeter, he read chemistry at Keble College, Oxford and, after serving in the military, read a DPhil in the history of Victorian chemistry under the supervision of Alistair Cameron Crombie, Oxford University's Professor of the History of Science. After Oxford he was appointed as Durham's lecturer in the history of science in the Department of Philosophy and remained there for the duration of his career. He served on the editorial boards of Ambix, Archives of Natural, History Annals of Science, and the British Journal for the History of Science and edited history of science book series for Cambridge University Press, Routledge and Ashgate Publishers.

Although he was trained as a historian of ideas, Knight spent his career developing a unique approach to the history of science that draws from methods used in the history of the book, social history and biographical history. His interest in the cultural history of science led him to write a number of books that focused on a wide range of topics, including the history of chemistry, the history of natural history, science and religion, and the public understanding of science. He was President of the British Society for the History of Science and received numerous awards during the duration of his career, including the Templeton Award for his work on nineteenth century natural theology and the American Chemical Society's prestigious Edelstein Award for his research in the history of chemistry.

Knight and his wife, Sarah, had six children.

== Works ==
=== Single authored books ===
- Atoms and Elements (1967)
- The Nature of Science (1976)
- Ordering the World (1981)
- The Age of Science (1986)
- Natural Science Books in English, 1600-1900 (1989)
- Humphry Davy: Science and Power (1992)
- Ideas in Chemistry (1992)
- Science in the Romantic Era (1998)
- Science and Spirituality (2003),
- Public Understanding of Science (2006)
- Voyaging in Strange Seas: The Great Revolution in Science (2014)

=== Jointly edited books ===
- (with M D Eddy) Science and Beliefs; from Natural Philosophy to Natural Science (2005)
- (with M D Eddy) William Paley’s Natural Theology: or, Evidences of the Existence and Attributes of the Deity (2006)
