= Anti-Dühring =

1878 book by Friedrich Engels

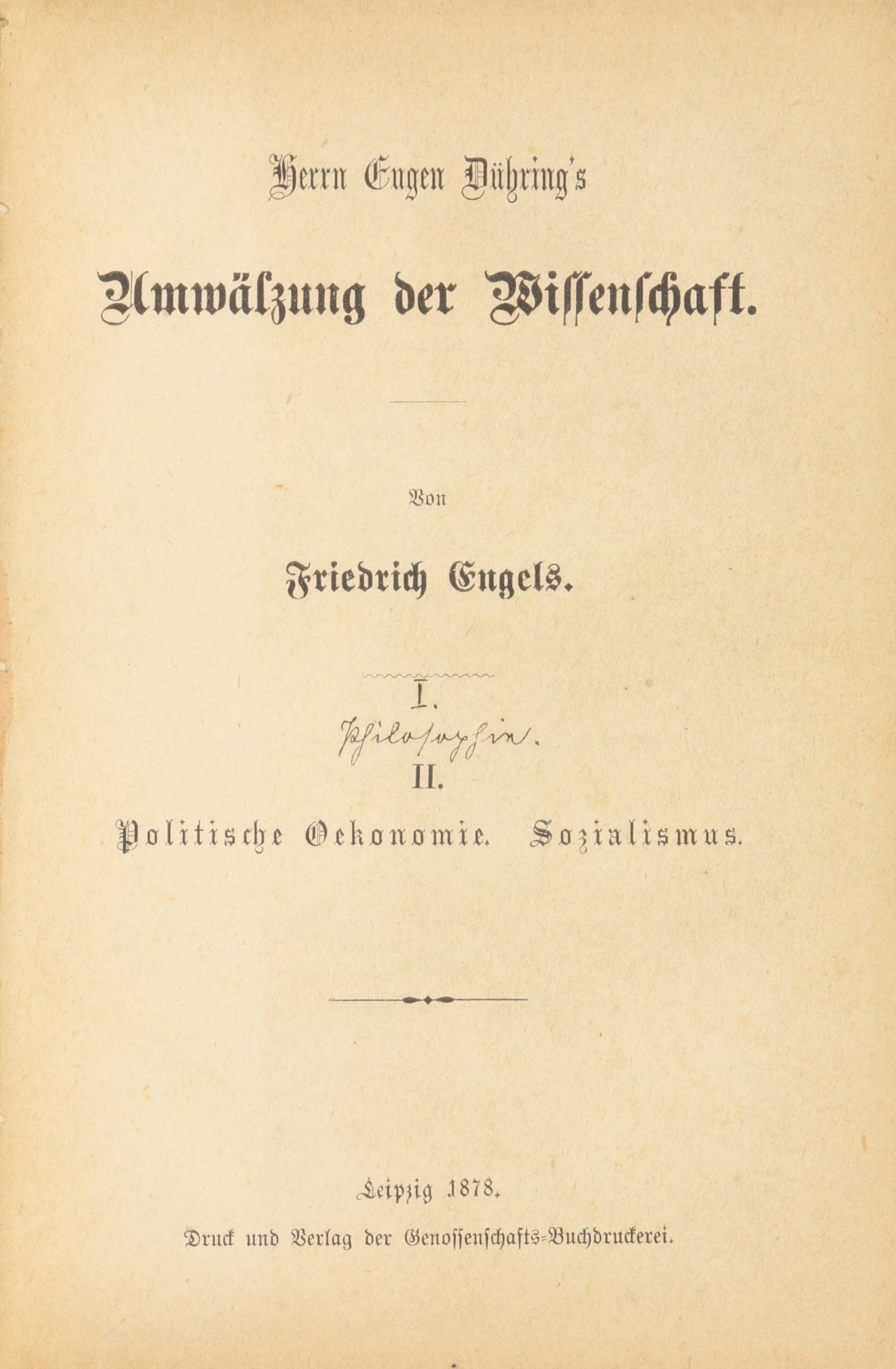
- Title page of the first edition
- Author: Friedrich Engels
- Original title: Herrn Eugen Dührings Umwälzung der Wissenschaft
- Language: German
- Subject: Philosophy; Political economy
- Published: 1877–1878 (serial); 1878 (book)
- Publisher: Vorwärts (serial); Genossenschafts Buchdruckerei (book)
- Publication place: Leipzig, German Empire
- English publication date: 1907
- Text: Anti-Dühring at Wikisource

Herr Eugen Dühring's Revolution in Science (German: Herrn Eugen Dührings Umwälzung der Wissenschaft), commonly known as Anti-Dühring, is a book by Friedrich Engels, published in 1878 and first serialised in the newspaper Vorwärts in 1877–1878. The work is a polemical response to the philosophical views of Eugen Dühring, a German philosopher and socialist whose ideas were gaining influence within the Social Democratic Party of Germany (SPD). In countering Dühring, Engels provided a comprehensive and accessible exposition of Marxism as a "science". The book is divided into three parts—Philosophy, Political Economy, and Socialism—and became a major contribution to the development of Marxism as a systematic and coherent school of thought.

The work was highly influential in the emerging socialist movements of Europe, and was instrumental in defining and popularising concepts such as historical materialism and dialectical materialism. A section of the book was later edited and published separately in 1880 as the popular pamphlet Socialism: Utopian and Scientific. In the 20th century, some critics, particularly in the tradition of Western Marxism, argued that Anti-Dühring represented a distortion of Karl Marx's thought, creating a rigid, scientistic dogma that later contributed to the ideology of the Soviet Union. However, Engels's biographers note that Marx was deeply involved in the book's creation, wrote a chapter for it, and endorsed it as an authentic expression of their shared philosophy.

== Background ==
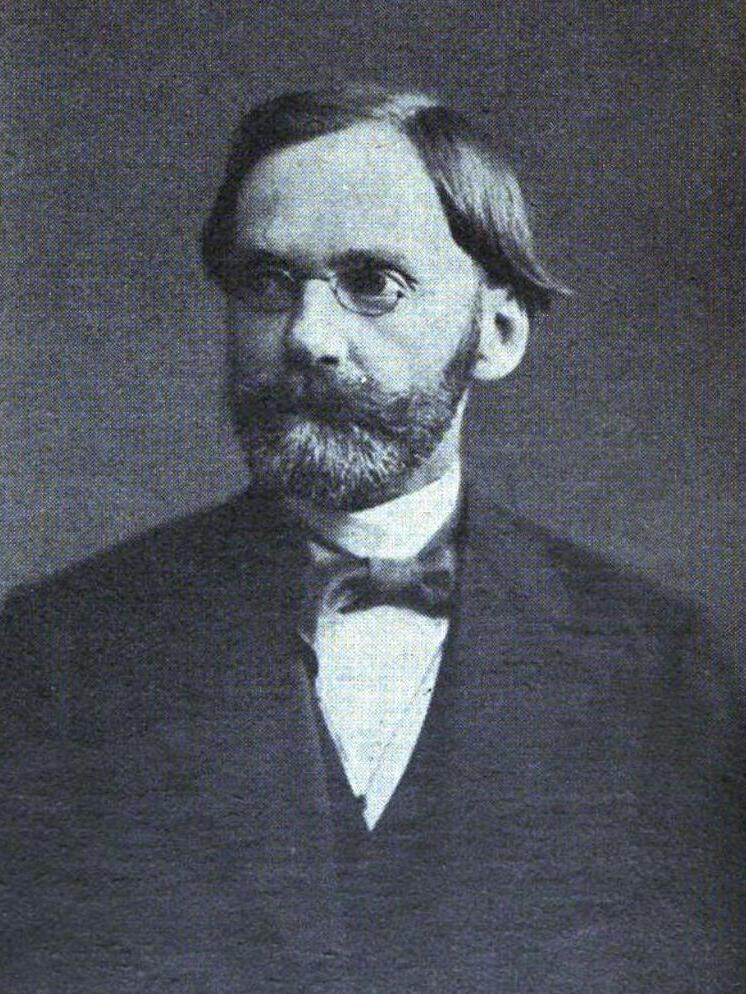
Eugen Dühring

In the mid-1870s, the ideas of Eugen Dühring, a blind lecturer in philosophy at the University of Berlin, began to gain significant influence within the German socialist movement. His influence grew inside the newly formed Social Democratic Party of Germany (SPD), which had been established at the Gotha Congress in 1875 through a merger of the Lassallean General German Workers' Association and the "Eisenacher" party led by August Bebel and Wilhelm Liebknecht. Dühring's socialism was a critique of Marxism; he rejected its economic determinism and proposed a gradualist political programme focused on more immediate material gains for the working class. His "force theory" emphasised the power of strikes and collective action to achieve social change through autonomous communes (Wirtschaftscommunen). His pragmatic and accessible approach appealed to many German socialists, including Eduard Bernstein, who found the philosophical system of Karl Marx to be arcane and unrealisable. At the time, Dühring was regarded as one of the party's chief theorists.

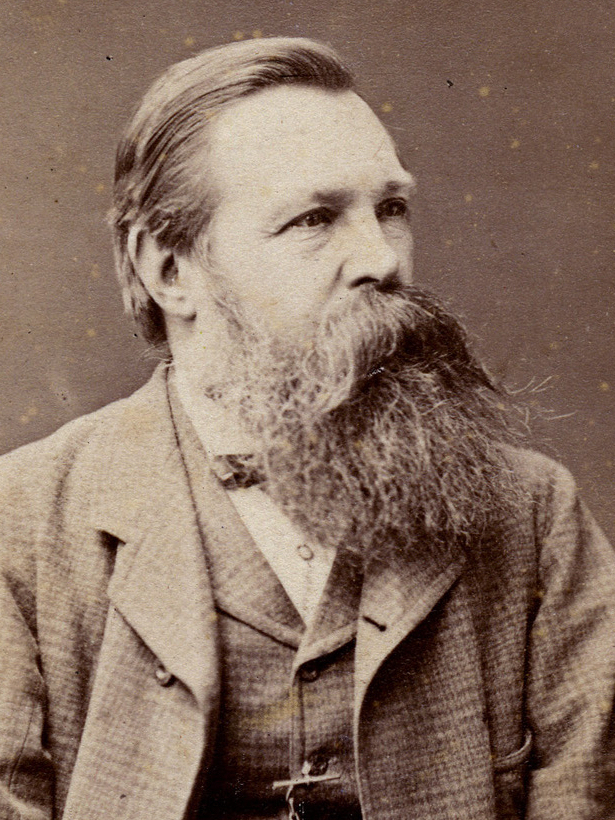
Friedrich Engels

Dühring was also an aggressive ideological opponent, dismissing Marx as a "scientific figure of fun" and saving particular scorn for Friedrich Engels, whom he called the "Siamese twin" who had only to look at his own position as a manufacturer to produce his exploitative portrait of capitalism. Dühring's growing popularity prompted Liebknecht to urge Engels to respond. Engels was initially hesitant, concerned about attacking a blind man, but was persuaded by what he saw as "the chap's colossal arrogance".

Engels and Marx viewed Dühring's theories as a form of "petty-bourgeois socialism" that threatened the theoretical foundations of their proletarian movement. Engels was also concerned with a broader intellectual trend of "shallow materialist popularisation" in the philosophy of science that had followed the publication of Charles Darwin's work, in which writers like Karl Vogt and Ludwig Büchner promoted "scientific systems" to validate their schemes for social reform. Influenced by the scientific enthusiasm of his day, Engels saw the polemic as an opportunity not only to refute Dühring but also to counter what he considered his outdated mechanistic materialism with a new, dialectical materialism. He interrupted his long-term work on the manuscript of Dialectics of Nature to focus on the polemic, which he considered a tedious but necessary "ideological knockabout".

== Content ==
Anti-Dühring was Engels's major attempt to codify and popularise the Marxist worldview. It presented a comprehensive account of their philosophy, moving beyond a narrow critique of Dühring to offer a "pacey, engaging and comprehensible explanation of the science of Marxism". The book's full title was an "ironically inverted parody" of Dühring's praise for the American economist Henry Charles Carey, whom Marx had also criticized. The work is divided into three sections, reflecting its broad scope.

=== Part I: Philosophy ===
In the first section, Engels explains the foundations of dialectical materialism. He contrasts the "metaphysical" mode of thought, characterized by fixed and isolated categories, with the "dialectical" method, which he traces to ancient Greek philosophers and especially to Georg Wilhelm Friedrich Hegel. For Engels, dialectics "comprehends things and their representations, ideas, in their essential connection, concatenation, motion, origin, and ending". He argued that the laws of dialectics, which Hegel had applied to ideas, were also applicable to the natural sciences and the material world, stating that "the dialectics of the mind is only the reflection of the forms of motion of the real world, both of nature and of history." Drawing on his research for Dialectics of Nature, Engels outlined three fundamental laws of dialectics:

1. The law of the transformation of quantity into quality and vice versa.
2. The law of the interpenetration of opposites.
3. The law of the negation of the negation.

He argued that these laws, which described a process of development through contradiction, could explain the evolution of not just history and society, but also biology, chemistry, and physics. Engels also anticipated the "twilight of philosophy", arguing that as the sciences developed their own general laws, philosophy would be rendered obsolete; all that would remain of "all former philosophy" is "the science of thought and its laws—formal logic and dialectics."

=== Part II: Political Economy ===
The second part of the book provides an overview of Marx's critique of political economy, as detailed in Das Kapital. Engels explains the theory of surplus value and how it arises from the exploitation of labour in a capitalist system. He argues that the capitalist mode of production is defined by a fundamental contradiction between the socialised nature of production and the private appropriation of its products. Engels presents the materialist conception of history, which he defines as the view that "'all past history, with the exception of its primitive stages, was the history of class struggles'", with these classes being "the product of the relations of production and exchange", i.e. the economic relations of their time. Political and legal structures, as well as prevailing ideas, are ultimately determined by this economic base of society.

=== Part III: Socialism ===
In the final section, Engels outlines the history and theory of scientific socialism. He distinguishes the Marxist approach from that of the utopian socialists like Henri de Saint-Simon, Charles Fourier, and Robert Owen. While acknowledging their important critiques of capitalist society, Engels argues that their visions were merely "pure phantasies" because they were not grounded in a scientific understanding of historical development and class struggle. Engels's concept of scientific socialism was based on what he called Marx's two great discoveries: the materialist conception of history and the theory of surplus value.

Engels argues that scientific socialism, by contrast, is based on a materialist analysis of history. The contradictions inherent in capitalism will inevitably lead to a social revolution in which the proletariat seizes political power. This act, he claims, resolves the contradiction at the heart of capitalism by transforming the means of production into public property. Engels famously describes the subsequent trajectory: "The state is not 'abolished'. It withers away." This process marks "the ascent of man from the kingdom of necessity to the kingdom of freedom".

== Publication and influence ==
Anti-Dühring was first serialised in Vorwärts between 1877 and 1878, and published as a book in Leipzig in 1878. The work was a "credible critique" that successfully marginalized Dühring's influence within the German social-democratic movement and "put [Engels's] name before a substantial public." It became a "Marxist handbook" that codified the ideas of dialectical materialism and scientific socialism. For many socialists, it provided the primary text through which a younger generation in Germany and across Europe came to understand Marxism. Figures such as August Bebel, Georgi Plekhanov, Eduard Bernstein, and Karl Kautsky were all heavily influenced by the book. According to the later Soviet scholar David Riazanov, the book was "epoch-making in the history of Marxism", as the younger generation learned from it "what was scientific socialism, what were its philosophic premises, what was its method". Kautsky recalled that "it was only through Anti-Dühring that we learnt to understand Capital and read it properly".

Title page of the first English edition of Socialism: Utopian and Scientific, 1892

At the request of Paul Lafargue, Engels adapted a section of the book into a separate, more accessible pamphlet, which was published in 1880 as Socialism: Utopian and Scientific. This version became Engels's bestseller and had a "tremendous impression" in France and beyond, serving as a popular primer for scientific socialism. Engels himself noted in 1892 that it had been translated into ten languages. According to Terrell Carver, the pamphlet was "the Communist Manifesto of its time, but arguably ... even more influential," calling it "the work from which millions of conversions to Marxism were made".

== Legacy ==
The influence of Anti-Dühring in codifying and popularising Marxism was immense. In the 20th century, its legacy became a subject of controversy. Beginning with Georg Lukács, and followed by other Western Marxists such as Stanisław Brzozowski and Jean-Paul Sartre, some critics argued that Anti-Dühring represented an "Engelsian inversion" of Marx's philosophy. Critics claimed that Engels had created a rigid, scientistic dogma by extending Marx's dialectical method to the natural world, a move they argued was absent in Marx's own writings. The philosopher Leszek Kołakowski identified four key points of divergence between Marx and Engels that originated in Anti-Dühring: the replacement of Marx's anthropocentrism with naturalistic evolutionism; the shift from Marx's epistemology of praxis to a technical interpretation of knowledge; the idea of philosophy being superseded by science rather than merging with life as a whole; and the focus on infinite progression over revolutionary eschatology.

The American scholar Norman Levine argued that Engels was the "first revisionist" of Marx and that this "Engelsism" laid the foundation for the later dogmatism of Soviet Marxism. In his book The Tragic Deception: Marx Contra Engels (1975), Levine presented what he called Marx's "dialectical naturalism"—centered on human praxis and anthropology—as being in direct opposition to "Engelsism," which he characterized as a form of "mechanistic materialism" and "social positivism." Levine argued that Engels's Anti-Dühring is central to this distortion; its deterministic and positivist approach, its focus on technology as the primary driver of history, and its application of supposed dialectical laws to nature created a rigid dogma that erased the humanistic and anthropological core of Marx's philosophy. This interpretation suggests that Engels's scientism was directly responsible for the ideology of the Soviet Union. Joseph Stalin's chapter on "Dialectical and Historical Materialism" in the Short Course (1938) drew heavily on Engels's formulations from Anti-Dühring and Dialectics of Nature to create a totalising and "indisputable" state philosophy.

However, biographers of Engels dispute the idea that he knowingly corrupted Marx's thought. Tristram Hunt points out that Marx was the "prime mover" behind the book, had the entire manuscript read to him before publication, contributed a small section on economics, and recommended it as an important text for understanding German socialism. According to Hunt, both Marx and Engels had been energized by the scientific progress of the day, and Anti-Dühring represented an "expression of authentic, mature Marxist opinion". Terrell Carver notes that Marx's own interest in science and his view of the dialectical law applying to both nature and society mean that Anti-Dühring's grand theoretical system was an authentic expression of their joint outlook. S. H. Rigby argues that the supposed distinctions between the two thinkers are often overstated, noting that Marx's own writings contain "vulgar materialist and positivist claims" similar to those for which Engels is criticised. Rigby concludes that the attempt to make Engels a "scapegoat for the views which Marx himself quite explicitly formulated" is unconvincing.
