= Dialectical materialism =

Marxist philosophy of nature and science

Dialectical materialism is a philosophy of nature and philosophy of science developed in the late 19th century, largely from the writings of Friedrich Engels. By synthesising Georg Wilhelm Friedrich Hegel's dialectic with philosophical materialism, it proposes that the world is material, that all phenomena are the result of matter in motion, and that the world's evolution is the product of a dialectical process driven by internal contradiction. It posits a set of general laws—most notably the transformation of quantity into quality, the interpenetration of opposites, and the negation of the negation—that are claimed to govern nature, society, and thought.

The intellectual origins of dialectical materialism can be traced to 19th-century German idealism, particularly Hegel's theory of the dialectic as a logical process of development. Karl Marx and Friedrich Engels inverted Hegel's idealist system, proposing that the dialectic was not a process of the "Concept" or "Idea" but of the real, material world. While Marx never used the term "dialectical materialism", he applied some of its principles in his critique of political economy and his theory of history, historical materialism. After Marx's death, Engels extended the dialectical method to the natural sciences in works such as Anti-Dühring (1878) and Dialectics of Nature, formulating what he saw as its general laws. The term "dialectical materialism" was coined in 1887 by Joseph Dietzgen, though it was the Russian Marxist Georgi Plekhanov who introduced it to Marxist literature in the 1890s.

In the 20th century, dialectical materialism was further developed by Vladimir Lenin, who adapted it for his revolutionary political project. In Materialism and Empirio-criticism (1909), Lenin redefined matter in purely epistemological terms as "objective reality" and introduced the principle of "partisanship", which asserted that all philosophy is inherently political and tied to class struggle. The doctrine was codified by Joseph Stalin in his 1938 essay Dialectical and Historical Materialism, which became the mandatory ideological framework for scientific and philosophical inquiry in the Soviet Union. In this form, often referred to as "diamat", it was taught as the official philosophy of the Soviet Union (and other Marxist–Leninist states) and used to justify state policy. After Stalin's death, a period of "de-Stalinization" led to critiques of its dogmatism and a "thaw" in Soviet philosophy.

The doctrine of dialectical materialism has been subject to extensive criticism. A central debate concerns the work of Engels, whom critics in the Western Marxist tradition, such as Georg Lukács, accused of distorting Marx's thought with a positivist and metaphysical "dialectics of nature". Other commentators have argued that the doctrine evolved from a philosophical project into a rigid, quasi-religious "political cosmology" under Soviet rule, serving primarily as an instrument of ideological control.

== Intellectual origins ==
The intellectual tradition that culminated in the doctrine of dialectical materialism began with German idealism in the late 18th century and evolved through the work of Georg Wilhelm Friedrich Hegel, the Young Hegelians, Karl Marx, Friedrich Engels, and finally the Russian Marxists, who formalized the doctrine. The 19th century saw a confluence of rapid developments in philosophy and the natural sciences that set the context for this tradition. The materialism of the French Enlightenment, bolstered by advances in science, had challenged traditional religious and metaphysical worldviews. In reaction, a renaissance of idealism occurred in Germany, culminating in the grandiose system of Hegel, which emphasized development, process, and historical change. At the same time, sciences like geology and biology were making discoveries that revealed the long, evolutionary history of the natural world, most notably Charles Darwin's theory of evolution, which placed humanity firmly within nature.

=== German Idealism and Romanticism ===
Classical German philosophers from Immanuel Kant onwards shared the assumption that all branches of knowledge formed a single, integrated system. The early German Romantics and Idealists, particularly Hegel's immediate predecessors Johann Gottlieb Fichte and Friedrich Wilhelm Joseph Schelling, developed systems of thought based on the dialectical interplay of fundamental opposites.

Schelling's philosophy of nature, or Naturphilosophie, was particularly influential. He argued that the Absolute, or ultimate reality, was a unified identity of mind and nature, subject and object. He posited two standpoints from which to view reality: "Reflection", which statically analyses objects as separate and fixed concepts, and "Speculation", which grasps the dynamic, interconnected flow of reality. Schelling's system was built on a series of polar opposites: Universal and Particular, inner and outer, Nature and Society, necessity and freedom. In this framework, "Nature" represented the realm of Particularity, fragmentation, and necessity, while "Society" represented Universality, cohesion, and freedom.

The Romantic political economist Adam Müller applied these philosophical ideas to economics, conceptualizing "use value" as the Particular, individual character of a commodity and "exchange value" as its Universal, social character. Müller argued that capitalism would reach a point of culmination in a world market, at which point it would collapse.

=== Hegel's system ===
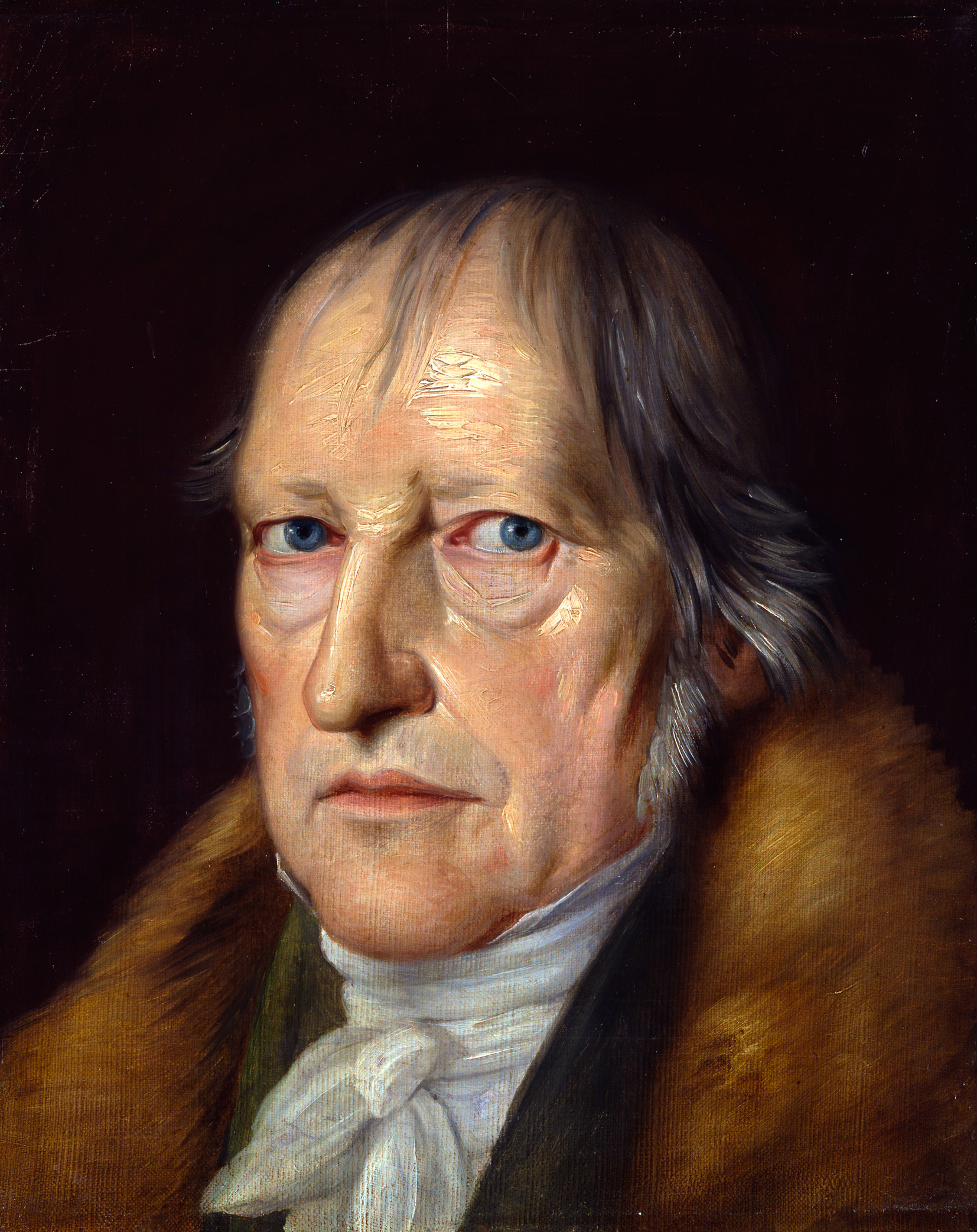
Georg Wilhelm Friedrich Hegel

Georg Wilhelm Friedrich Hegel systematized and radicalized the work of his Romantic predecessors. While he shared their goal of developing a comprehensive system, he broke with them by championing rational consciousness over the Romantic focus on intuition and the unconscious. Hegel's central project was to demonstrate the logical, self-driven development of the "Concept" (Begriff), which he saw as the engine of both thought and reality. His philosophical system is divided into three parts: the Science of Logic, the Philosophy of Nature, and the Philosophy of Mind (Geist).

The Logic traces the movement of the Concept from the most abstract category, "Being", through a series of internal contradictions to its synthesis in the "Absolute Idea". This process, which Hegel called "dialectic", was a progression from the abstract to the concrete. Hegel drew a sharp distinction between the analytical mode of thought, which he called "Understanding" (Verstand), and the higher, synthetic mode he called "Reason" (Vernunft). The former deals with fixed, isolated categories and is the basis for everyday thinking and the natural sciences, while the latter grasps the unity of opposites and the dynamic, self-moving nature of the Concept. Hegel viewed "Nature" as the Idea in its state of "self-degradation"—the realm of contingency and necessity, external to the Concept. "Mind" or "Spirit" (Geist) represented the synthesis of the logical Idea and Nature, the sphere of human consciousness, society, and history, characterized by freedom and rationality. In his Philosophy of Right, Hegel analyzed the structures of society—the family, civil society, and the state—as logical moments in the self-actualization of freedom.

=== Young Hegelian critique ===
After Hegel's death, some of his followers, known as the Young Hegelians, began to critique his system. The Young Hegelians operated in a context shaped by the "political theology of Restoration," in which conservative thinkers sought to bolster the authority of the monarchy after the Napoleonic Wars. They rejected what they saw as its "reactionary, anti-dialectical tendency", which presented itself and the contemporary Prussian state as the culmination of all historical development. The Right Hegelians used the system as a defense of the existing order, while the Young (or Left) Hegelians emphasized the "radical negativity of the dialectical process" to launch critiques of religion and politics. Among the Young Hegelians, the Polish philosopher August Cieszkowski argued that post-Hegelian philosophy must move from thought to action, or "praxis", while the Russian anarchist Mikhail Bakunin developed a dialectic where the antithesis actively destroys the thesis rather than being reconciled in a synthesis, famously stating, "The desire to destroy is itself a creative desire."

Ludwig Feuerbach was another key figure in this transition. In works like The Essence of Christianity (1841), Feuerbach "inverted" Hegel's idealism, arguing that abstract philosophical and religious concepts were merely alienated projections of man's own essential nature (Gattungswesen). He sought to replace the abstractions of philosophy with the study of "real, material" man and nature, describing his own philosophy as a form of "anthropological materialism" or "naturalism". Feuerbach's critique began at the core of Hegel's system: the concept of nature. For Hegel, nature was something derivative, the "other-being" of the Absolute Idea. Feuerbach countered with a "naturalistic monism", asserting that nature is the causa sui, grounded in itself, and that all science must be founded on it. This move toward materialism and the critique of abstraction heavily influenced the young Karl Marx.

== Karl Marx's thought ==
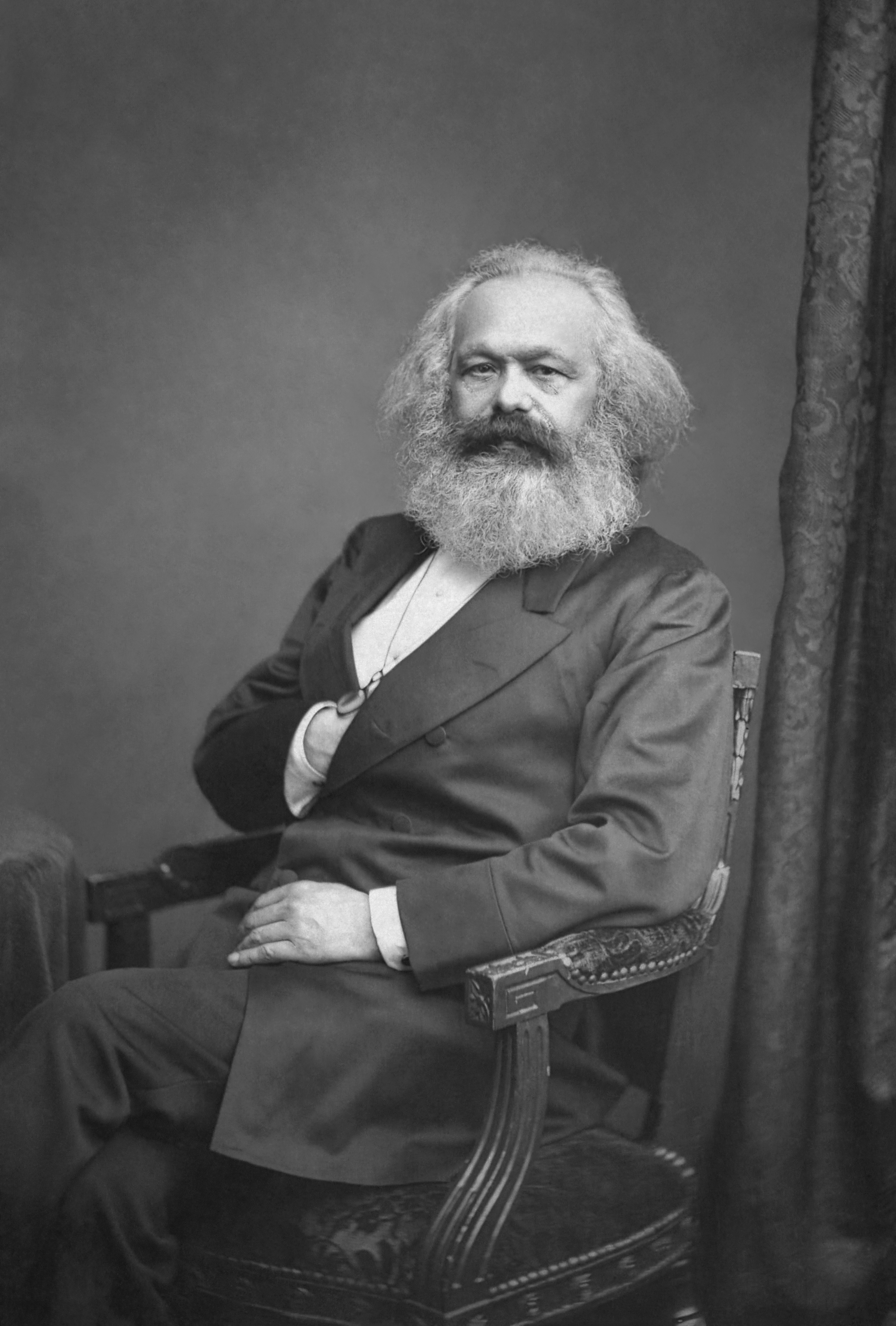
Karl Marx

Karl Marx and Friedrich Engels adopted and transformed Hegel's dialectic, "inverting" it from an idealist framework into a materialist one. They rejected Hegel's conception of the self-developing Spirit as the motor of history, arguing instead that the development of human society is driven by the contradictions within material, socioeconomic conditions.

Marx argued that Hegel's idealism committed a "double error" because it contained "uncritical positivism and equally uncritical idealism", leading to the "philosophical dissolution and restoration of the empirical world": first, it dissolved the empirical world into abstract categories, but then to account for the material world, it is forced into an "uncritical restoration" of the existing social structure unchanged, baptizing existing reality as the rational outcome of the dialectical process. In other words, "Hegel's task is not to discover the truth of empirical existence but to discover the empirical existence of the truth".

For Marx, the dialectical method is not merely a way of describing the world, but a tool for revealing its transient, historical character and its potential for revolutionary transformation. In his words, dialectic "regards every historically developed social form as in fluid movement, and therefore takes into account its transient nature not less than its momentary existence... it is in its essence critical and revolutionary." According to Bertell Ollman, dialectic is revolutionary because it "helps us to see the present as a moment through which our society is passing," forcing an examination of "where it has come from and where it is heading as part of learning what it is." Both Marx and Friedrich Engels felt that a separate compendium on dialectics was needed to make the Hegelian method more accessible, though Marx's intended work on the topic was never written.

=== Early philosophy and historical materialism ===
In his 1843 Critique of Hegel's Philosophy of Right, Marx applied Feuerbach's concept of alienation to the political sphere. He argued that the modern state is an "alienation of the collective nature of society," an abstract entity separate from and opposed to the real life of the people. The goal of "true democracy" was to overcome this alienation by creating a "socialized human being" where the individual and the community are unified. Marx's critique of the "old materialism" of Feuerbach and the French mechanists in The German Ideology and his Theses on Feuerbach (1845—46) was that it was contemplative and failed to grasp the importance of "human sensuous activity" or praxis.

Diagram illustrating the theory of historical materialism

The philosophical foundation of Marx's materialist dialectic is his conception of human labor. He saw labor as the process that mediates between humanity and nature, the means by which humans consciously transform their environment and, in so doing, transform themselves. This provides a material basis for overcoming the dualism of subject and object, since labor is a unity of consciousness (the plan) and materiality (physical action). Marx's method, which came to be known as historical materialism, views history as a succession of modes of production, each with its own internal contradictions between the "forces of production" (technology, labor) and the "relations of production" (property, class structure). These contradictions lead to class struggle and ultimately to social revolution, which resolves the contradiction by establishing a new mode of production.

According to some scholars, this philosophy is best understood as "Marxian naturalism," a perspective that is historical, sociological, and anti-metaphysical, and which differs significantly from the system later developed by Engels and the Soviets. This perspective holds that man is a social being whose reality is shaped through labour. For Marx, nature itself becomes a "man-made nature," socially mediated through man's "unceasing sensuous labour and creation." According to the philosopher Alfred Schmidt, Marx's materialism was "non-ontological"; rather than propounding a metaphysical "World Substance" to replace Hegel's "World Spirit", Marx saw the world as mediated through the "socio-historical life-process of human beings." He argues that Marx's view, which adopted an intermediate position between Kant and Hegel, was that practice constitutes the objects of human experience by shaping the raw material of nature. The "real Subject" that constitutes the world of experience is "organized social labour".

=== Critique of political economy ===
Marx's intellectual project developed into a critique of political economy patterned on Hegel's Science of Logic. He aimed to show that economic categories such as the commodity, money, and capital were logically interconnected and developed dialectically from one another, just as Hegel's logical categories did. For Marx, these economic categories were not mere ideas but "crystallizations" or "abstractions" of man's real social relationships, which had become "externalized" and appeared as alien, natural forces. In his early Economic and Philosophical Manuscripts of 1844, Marx outlined this project, identifying "alienated labour" and "private property" as the fundamental concepts from which all other economic categories could be deduced. In his 1857–58 drafts, later known as the Grundrisse, he systematically used the Hegelian dialectic of the Universal and the Particular to derive the category of money from the commodity. Exchange value was the commodity's "Universal" or "social" aspect, while use value was its "Particular" or "natural" aspect. Money represented the Universal equivalent, an abstract form of man's social nature, separated from the Particularity of the commodities themselves.

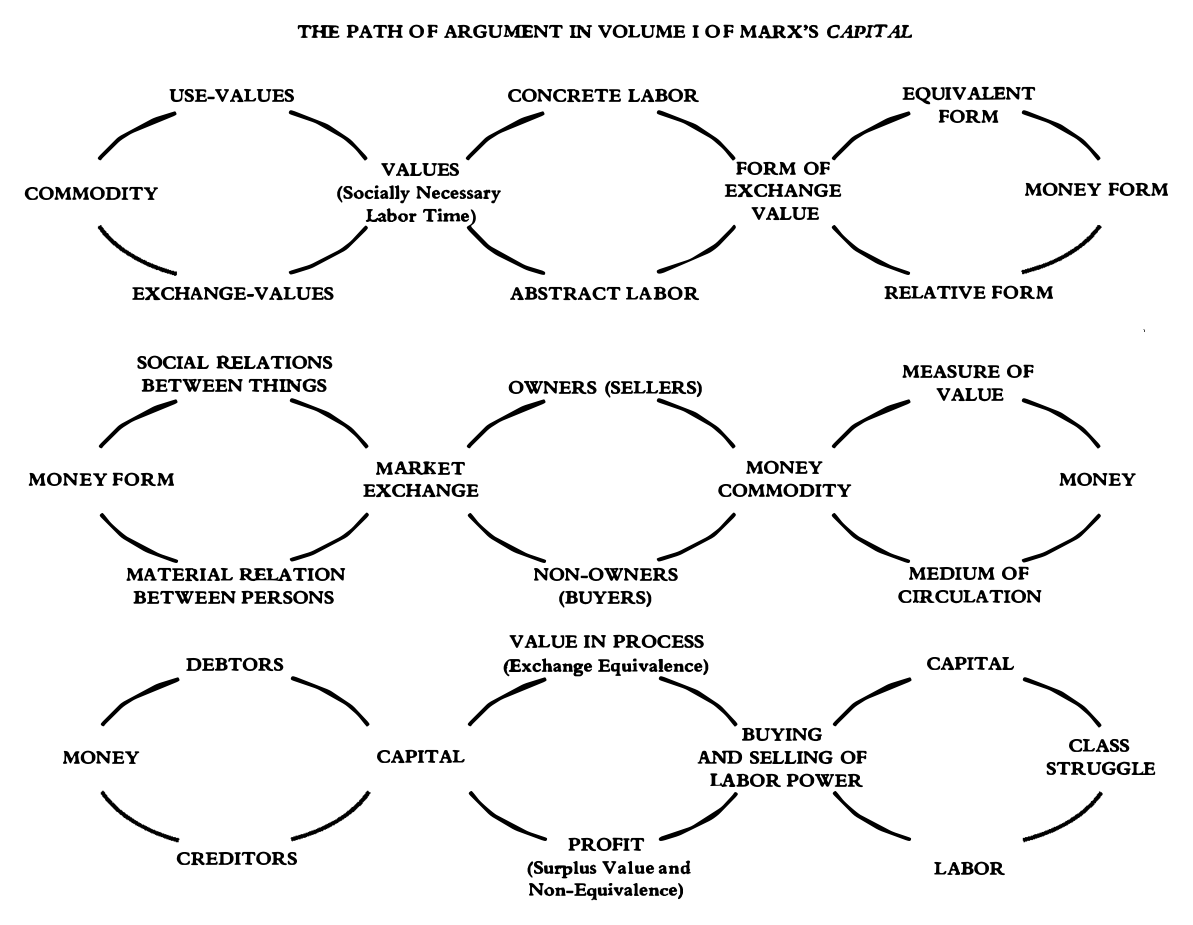
Dialectical unfolding of core categories in Capital, Volume I, as charted by David Harvey. Marx's method involves revealing internal contradictions that propel the argument forward.

In his magnum opus, Das Kapital, Marx applied this dialectical method to the analysis of capitalism. He began his analysis with the "cell form" of capitalist society—the commodity—and uncovered its internal contradiction between use-value and exchange-value. He traced how this fundamental contradiction unfolds through successive forms—money, capital, surplus value—to generate the systemic contradictions of the capitalist mode of production, such as the antagonism between the bourgeoisie and the proletariat.

In Marx's "philosophy of internal relations", things are not conceived as independent entities that are subsequently brought into relationship, but are themselves constituted by their interconnections. A thing's relations are "internal" to what it is, such that if a significant relation changes, the thing itself becomes something different. For example, capital is not a static "thing" that has a relationship to labor, but is itself a "definite social relationship" that includes labor as an essential component. This relational ontology requires a specific methodological tool: the "process of abstraction." This is the mental activity by which the thinker carves out provisional boundaries in the seamless, relational world to create units for analysis. This process operates in three "modes": abstraction of extension (determining the spatial and temporal boundaries of a unit), level of generality (determining the level of generality from the unique to the universal), and vantage point (selecting a perspective from which to view the relation).

=== Later revisions and Russian studies ===
Marx's original scheme envisioned a continuous expansion of capital, driven by its own internal logic, which would progressively dissolve all pre-capitalist social formations and create a universal world market. This process, which he termed the "subsumption" of labour and society under capital, would eventually create the conditions for its own collapse and the emergence of communism. However, he found himself unable to logically demonstrate the necessary expansion of capitalism from its internal process of circulation. His empirical research revealed that the dissolution of traditional societies, such as in Britain, had often been accomplished by state force rather than by the purely economic "circulation of capital". His attitude towards Hegel, initially one of critical admiration, soured into scorn and eventually indifference as he moved away from speculative philosophy towards an empirically oriented "science of man".

This led him, from the late 1860s onwards, to an intensive study of the Russian peasant commune (mir). Works by Russian scholars like Maxim Kovalevsky convinced him that such agrarian communes were not necessarily doomed to be destroyed by capitalism. They could, under certain historical conditions, survive and even become a direct basis for socialism. This discovery was marked by a letter he wrote to Engels on 25 March 1868, in which he noted that the philosophical categories of the 'Universal' and the 'Particular' had concrete origins in the social forms of common land and private property. After this, Marx ceased to use these Hegelian philosophical terms in his writings. He revised the first volume of Capital, particularly the second German edition (1872) and the French translation (1875), to remove much of the Hegelian terminology and the universalist historical scheme, limiting his analysis of capitalism's origins to "Western Europe".

== Formulation by Engels and Plekhanov ==
The system of "dialectical materialism" was constructed after Marx's death by Friedrich Engels and Georgi Plekhanov. It combined a materialist ontology with a set of "dialectical laws" claimed to govern both nature and society.

=== Engels and the "dialectics of nature" ===
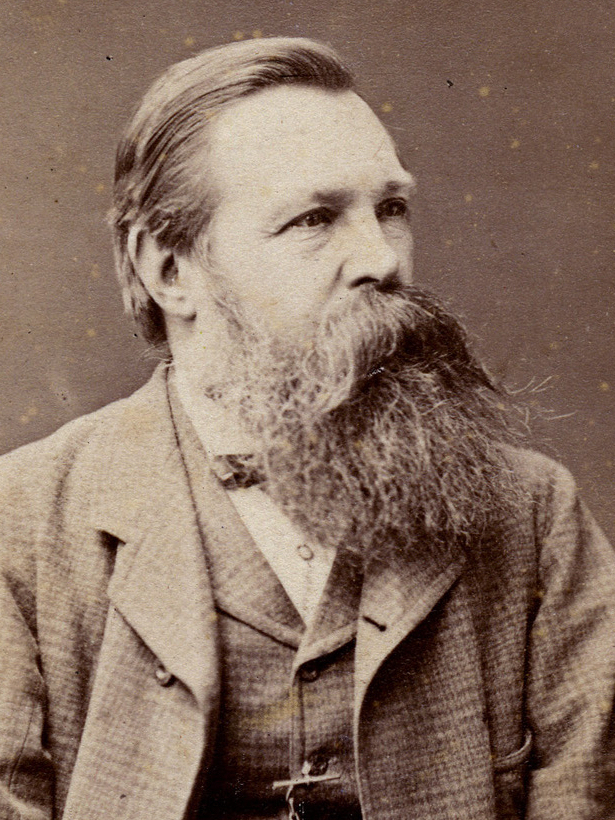
Friedrich Engels

Friedrich Engels initiated a significant shift by extending the dialectical method to the natural sciences. In works like Anti-Dühring (1878) and his posthumously published Dialectics of Nature, Engels, influenced by Charles Darwin's theory of evolution, proposed that nature itself was historical and developed dialectically. In this view, the "dialectic of concepts itself became merely the conscious reflex of the dialectical motion of the real world". He formulated what he considered the three general laws of dialectics:

1. The law of the transformation of quantity into quality and vice versa.
2. The law of the interpenetration of opposites.
3. The law of the negation of the negation.

For Engels, these were not just laws of thought but objective laws of the development of nature, society, and the human mind. His system was a form of "absolute materialism" which held that "the real unity of the world consists in its materiality". It was also anti-reductivist, arguing for the emergence of qualitatively new levels of existence, such as life and mind, from the complex organisation of matter—a doctrine of "emergent evolution". Some interpretations view this as a departure from Marx's view, which treated nature as a static, ahistorical backdrop for human social history, though others note that Marx's correspondence shows that he followed Engels's studies of the natural sciences with interest and believed that the law of the transformation of quantity into quality held "alike in history and natural science," a view he included in Capital. In Engels's view, the "economic relations of their time" furnished the "real base" from which the entire superstructure of society could be explained. This formulation positioned the economic base as the ultimate determining factor in history.

Anti-Dühring became the canonical statement of the new doctrine, and was the most systematic exposition of the Marxist worldview in its time, playing a decisive role in shaping the ideas of the Second International. Engels's undertaking was not a personal "inner urge" but a response to the political needs of the socialist movement, particularly the refutation of rival theories such as those of Eugen Dühring, and the need to provide a comprehensive, scientific worldview for the working class. According to Alfred Schmidt, Engels's approach differed fundamentally from Marx's: whereas Marx allowed the dialectic to emerge from the internal critique of political economy, Engels interpreted the finished results of natural science by applying dialectical categories externally to them, thereby relapsing into a "dogmatic metaphysic." According to Z. A. Jordan, Engels, a lifelong admirer of Hegel, synthesized Marx's naturalism with Hegelian philosophy and elements of French positivism, creating a form of "Hegelian positivism".

Engels's work was largely programmatic, and he was inconsistent on some points, such as the status of philosophy in relation to the sciences. While generally arguing for a synthesis of philosophy and science, he sometimes suggested that philosophy had been made superfluous by scientific advances. His historical account of science anticipated later developments in the philosophy of science, such as the work of Thomas Kuhn, but placed scientific development within a broader socio-historical context.

=== Plekhanov's synthesis ===
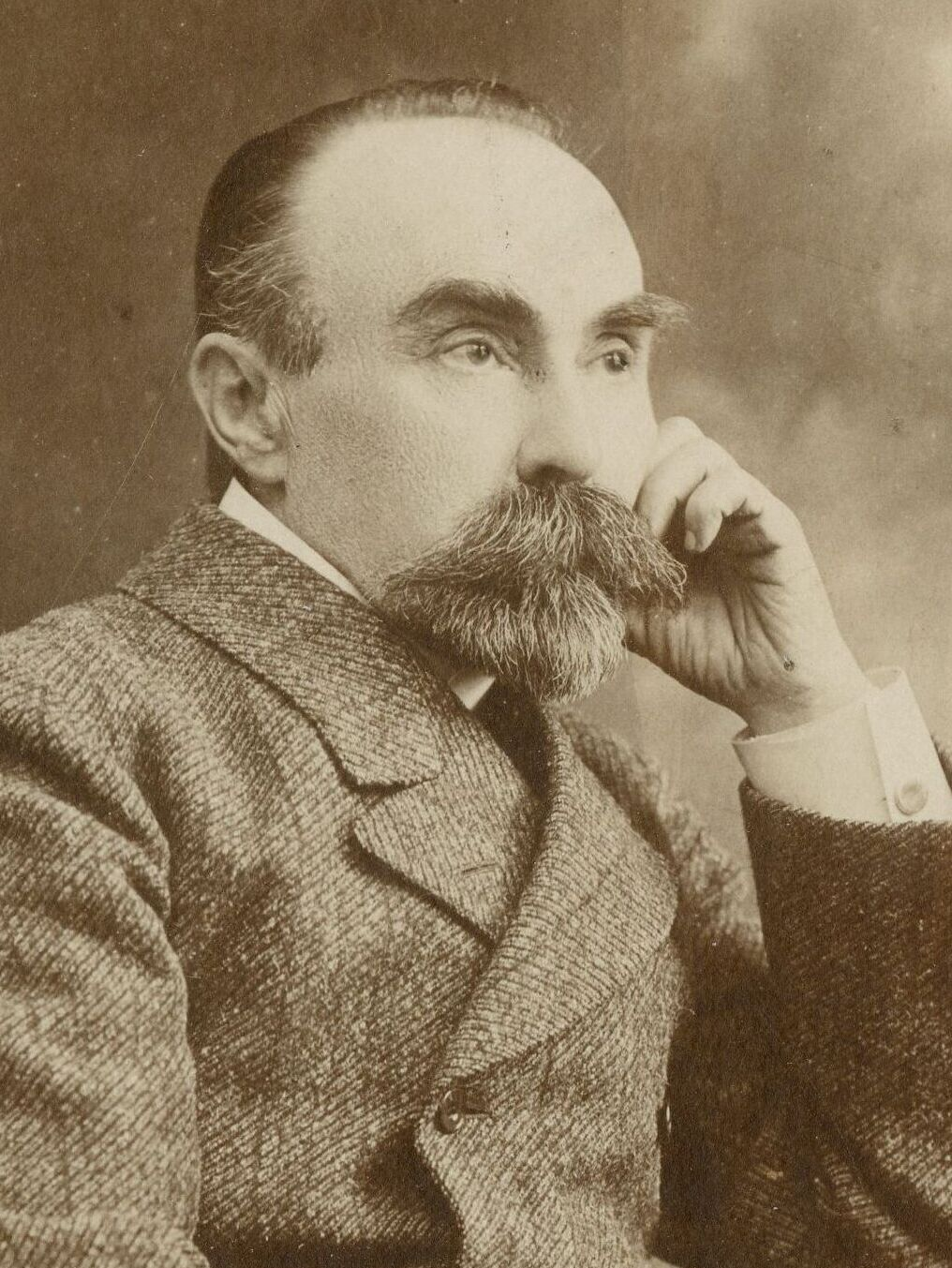
Georgi Plekhanov

Georgi Plekhanov, often called the "father of Russian Marxism," formally established the doctrine of "dialectical materialism" in the 1890s. In works like Socialism and the Political Struggle (1883) and The Development of the Monist View of History (1894), he systematized the ideas of Marx and Engels into a comprehensive philosophical system.

Plekhanov's primary motivation was his polemical struggle against the Russian revolutionary movement known as Narodism. He characterized the Narodniks as "subjectivists" who believed that Russia could bypass capitalism and achieve socialism based on the peasant commune, a view he attributed to their idealist philosophy. In opposition, he proposed "dialectical materialism" as the synthesis of two one-sided philosophical traditions: the "metaphysical materialism" of 18th-century France (e.g., Baron d'Holbach) and the "dialectical idealism" of German philosophy (Hegel). Plekhanov modified Engels's system, rejecting "absolute materialism" and adopting a more critical, Kantian-influenced epistemology he called the "theory of hieroglyphs," which held that human sensations do not directly copy external reality but function as symbols or "conventional signs" of it. He also reinterpreted the laws of dialectics, reducing them to two basic principles—the interpenetration of opposites and the transformation of quantity into quality—and discarding the Hegelian triad as a primary law.

In Plekhanov's "monist view", the development of the "productive forces" (the 'instruments of labour') was the ultimate cause of historical change. These forces determined the economic base, which in turn determined the ideological superstructure. A crucial innovation in Plekhanov's system was his reinterpretation of human nature. Whereas for Marx human "social nature" was a constant and the driving force of history, for Plekhanov human nature was a variable, a product of its external historical environment. History's driving force was thus located outside man, in the development of productive forces. This interpretation established the inevitability of capitalism in Russia, arguing that the country must pass through the same "natural phases of its development" as Western Europe. This "socio-cosmic" doctrine, which used cosmological laws to justify a particular path of social development, became the orthodox position of Russian Marxism and later of the Soviet state.

== The Second International ==
After the deaths of Marx and Engels, Marxism became the dominant ideology of the Second International (1889–1914), a federation of socialist parties. This period saw a dramatic shift in the intellectual climate, as a reaction against materialism gave rise to a "renaissance of idealism," particularly the philosophy of neo-Kantianism. A wide-ranging "revisionist controversy" emerged within the Marxist movement, which had a significant philosophical dimension.

=== Revisionism and the defence of "orthodoxy" ===
Eduard Bernstein, a leader of the German Social Democratic Party (SPD), initiated the revisionist trend. In his 1899 book Evolutionary Socialism, he rejected what he called the "treacherous" Hegelian dialectic as an "a priori" schema imposed on reality, arguing instead for a more gradual, evolutionary path to socialism. He further rejected philosophical materialism, advocating for a return to Kantian philosophy to provide an ethical foundation for socialism. This led to a dualism between nature and history, fact and value, and science and ethics.

Karl Kautsky, the leading theorist of "orthodoxy", defended dialectics and materialism against Bernstein. However, his commitment was inconsistent; he argued that historical materialism could be compatible with other philosophies such as Machism, and conceded that "Marx proclaimed no philosophy, but the end of all philosophy." This tendency to separate philosophical materialism from historical materialism was shared by other orthodox figures like Franz Mehring. The majority of the Second International's thinkers maintained that historical materialism could stand on its own without a broader philosophical foundation, with Plekhanov and Lenin being the only major theorists of the era to insist on the centrality of philosophical materialism.

=== Other philosophical trends ===
A variety of other philosophical currents emerged within the Second International. The school of Austro-Marxism, led by figures like Max Adler, sought to fuse Marxism with Kantian epistemology, rejecting Engels's materialism and the dialectics of nature. In France, Jean Jaurès developed a form of idealist, evolutionary pantheism, while Paul Lafargue espoused a mechanistic materialism inherited from the French Enlightenment. Georges Sorel interpreted Marxism as a revolutionary myth rather than a scientific theory, opposing all forms of determinism and rationalism. In Italy, Antonio Labriola developed a "philosophy of praxis," a historicist approach that saw science as a form of social labour and rejected epistemological realism. Polish Marxism was particularly unorthodox; thinkers like Ludwik Krzywicki and Stanisław Brzozowski developed phenomenalist and historicist interpretations of Marxism that were hostile to Darwinism and the dialectics of nature.

Because the philosophical writings of Marx and Engels were not widely available, many thinkers turned to the work of Joseph Dietzgen, a philosophical autodidact who had independently developed a form of dialectical materialism and coined the term in 1887. His works were recommended by Engels and became a key source for many, particularly working-class autodidacts in Britain and America, who saw him as the authority on philosophy.

== Soviet dialectical materialism ==
=== Lenin's revisions ===
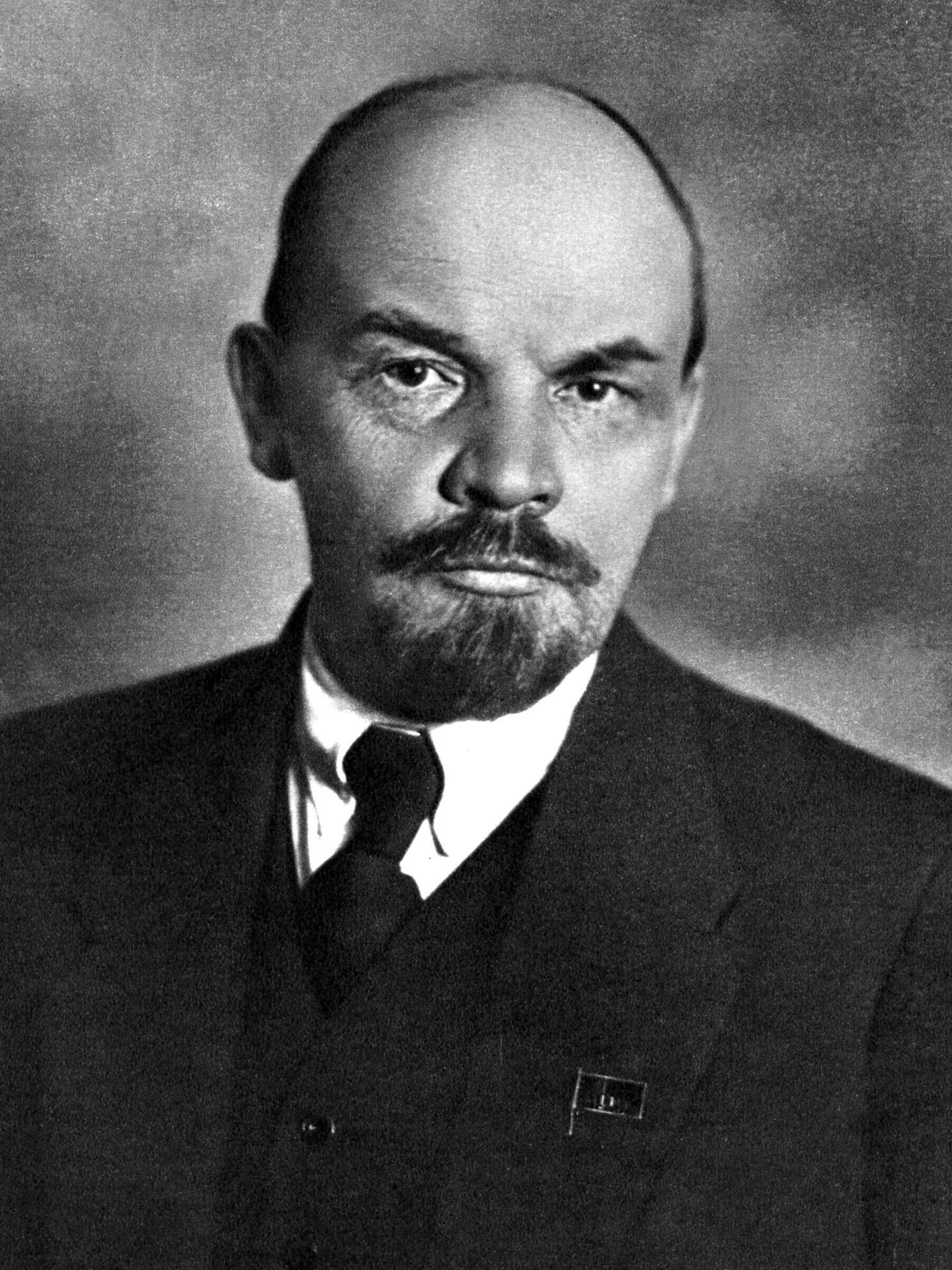
Vladimir Lenin

Vladimir Lenin's philosophy was a development of the ideas of Engels and Plekhanov, which he revised to serve his political and revolutionary ends. In his major philosophical work, Materialism and Empirio-criticism (1909), Lenin defended Engels's materialism against the Machist revisionists within his own party who, influenced by positivism, sought to develop a philosophy of science independent of metaphysics.

Lenin's key philosophical innovation was his redefinition of materialism as "epistemological materialism". He abandoned Engels's "absolute materialism" and its metaphysical concept of matter, replacing it with a purely epistemological definition: "Matter is a philosophical category designating the objective reality which is given to man by his sensation, and which is copied, photographed, and reflected by our sensations, while existing independently of them." This redefinition was a defensive measure. The "revolution in natural science" at the turn of the 20th century, where matter seemed to "vanish", had made the older, metaphysical concept of matter vulnerable to criticism. By defining matter in purely epistemological terms as "objective reality", Lenin hoped to make materialism immune to changes in physical theory. In this, Lenin's materialism became virtually synonymous with philosophical realism.

Lenin's second major contribution was the "principle of partisanship" (partijnost) in philosophy. He argued that all philosophy is fundamentally divided into two camps: materialism and idealism. This division, he claimed, corresponded to the class struggle between the proletariat and the bourgeoisie. Any deviation from materialism was thus a political concession to the class enemy.

In his Philosophical Notebooks, written during World War I, Lenin further revised the laws of dialectics. This later work showed a more sophisticated engagement with Hegel; Lenin now argued that "intelligent idealism is closer to intelligent materialism than stupid materialism" and that human consciousness "not only reflects the objective world, but creates it". He followed Plekhanov in discarding the law of the negation of the negation, but went further by reducing all three of Engels's laws to a single principle: the "unity and struggle of opposites." Compiling a list of sixteen "elements of dialectics", he declared the unity of opposites to be the "heart of the dialectic", giving much greater emphasis to internal contradiction as the source of self-movement than previous formulations had. For Lenin, this law provided a dialectical justification for cosmological atheism by demonstrating that the self-movement of matter, driven by internal contradiction, made a creator or external prime mover superfluous. Lenin's philosophy became an explicitly "socio-cosmic" cosmology, where the laws of nature were interpreted to justify a revolutionary political programme. It was an instrumentalist doctrine, a weapon in the class struggle.

=== Mechanist-Deborinite controversy ===
After the 1917 revolution, philosophical debates in the Soviet Union were dominated by the controversy between the "Mechanists" and the "Deborinites" (or "Dialecticians"). The Mechanists, led by figures like Ivan Skvortsov-Stepanov and Nikolai Bukharin, espoused a positivist-influenced materialism that sought to reduce philosophy to the natural sciences and dialectics to a theory of equilibrium. The Deborinites, led by Abram Deborin, were Hegelian-trained philosophers who insisted on the primacy of dialectics as a philosophical method that stood above the special sciences.

The journal Pod Znamenem Marksizma (Under the Banner of Marxism), founded in 1922, became the primary forum for these debates. Although he did not fully resolve the dispute, Lenin encouraged a "systematic study of Hegelian dialectics from a materialist standpoint" and proposed the formation of a "Society of Materialist Friends of Hegelian Dialectics". The posthumous publication of Engels's Dialectics of Nature in 1925 and Lenin's Philosophical Notebooks in 1929 provided new grounds for the debate, and appeared to lend support to the Deborinite position. The Mechanists argued that Engels's later writings showed a move toward a "mechanical understanding of nature," reducing all processes to physics and chemistry. The Deborinites, in contrast, emphasized the Hegelian philosophical framework of Engels's work, arguing that dialectics was a universal methodology that could not be reduced to any single science. The controversy ended in 1929 at the Second All-Union Conference of Marxist-Leninist Scientific Institutions, where the Deborinites succeeded in having the Mechanists formally condemned as a revisionist deviation. However, the Deborinites themselves were soon accused of "Menshevizing idealism" by a younger group of philosophers and were overthrown in 1930–1931.

=== Stalin's codification ===
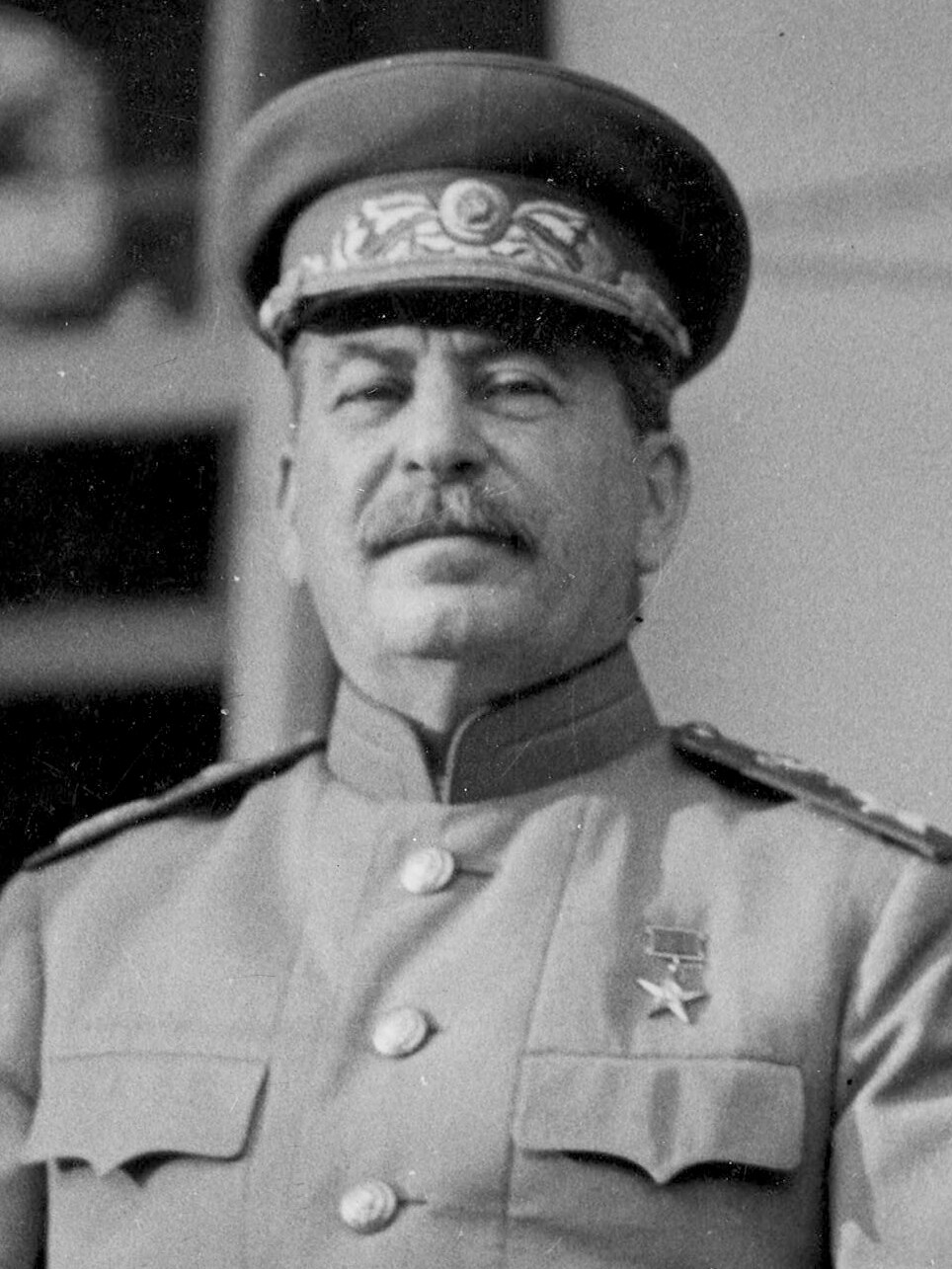
Joseph Stalin

Joseph Stalin's contribution was to codify Lenin's philosophy into the official and unchallengeable ideology of the Soviet state. His 1938 essay, Dialectical and Historical Materialism, which he contributed to A Short Course in the History of the All-Union Communist Party (Bolsheviks), became the canonical text for all students of philosophy and the "ideological catechism of Stalin's epoch". In this work, Stalin simplified and, in some cases, altered the previous understanding of dialectical materialism.

Stalin's "philosophical materialism" abandoned Lenin's dual concept of matter (philosophical and scientific), recognizing only the single, philosophical concept. He presented four "principal features" of the dialectical method:

1. Nature is a connected, integral whole.
2. Nature is in a state of continuous movement and change.
3. The process of development is a transition from quantitative to qualitative changes.
4. Internal contradictions are inherent in all things as the source of their self-movement.

This formulation is notable for completely eliminating the law of the negation of the negation. Stalin's version of dialectics became a rigid set of cosmological laws used to justify his political policies. For example, the law of the transition from quantitative to qualitative change was used to demonstrate the cosmic inevitability of revolution. The law of the unity and struggle of opposites was used to explain the origin of motion and the necessity of class struggle. The entire system was a "sociomorphic conception of the universe", where the laws of dialectics served as a cosmological justification for the inevitability of the Communist Party's policies and Stalin's own leadership.

Stalin's philosophy was characterized by its extreme "voluntarism" and "instrumentalism". Theory was not an end in itself but a "guide to action", and the will of the leader could determine the course of history. His original contributions to historical materialism included an emphasis on the "tremendous organizing, mobilizing and transforming value" of the superstructure (new ideas, theories, and political institutions) in reacting back upon the economic base, and the concept of "revolution from above." He proposed new "driving-forces" for the development of classless socialist society to replace the now-absent class struggle: the moral and political unity of Soviet society, Soviet patriotism, and criticism and self-criticism. Late in his life, in works such as Economic Problems of Socialism in the USSR (1951), Stalin appeared to retreat from this extreme position, acknowledging the existence of objective laws of nature and society that could not be overcome by political will.

=== Post-Stalin era ===
After Stalin's death in 1953, a period of "de-Stalinization" and "thaw" occurred in Soviet philosophy, as the critique of the "cult of personality" challenged the absolute authority of his philosophical works. The rigid structure of Stalin's 1938 pamphlet was criticised, and the three laws of dialectics as formulated by Engels were rehabilitated, including the "law of the negation of the negation". A revival of creative philosophical thought was spurred by the 1956 publication in Russian of Marx's early writings, particularly the Economic and Philosophic Manuscripts of 1844. The focus of Soviet Marxist philosophy shifted from class-based determinants to a broader concern with humanistic values and the "human essence". A new generation of philosophers, including figures like Genrikh Batishchev, re-emphasized the dialectical component of Marxism, focusing on concepts like alienation, activity (deiatel'nost), and the "ideal". However, despite the more critical atmosphere and debates over dogmatism, the fundamental Leninist framework, including the principle of "partisanship" and the ultimate authority of the Communist Party in philosophical matters, remained in place.

A leading figure of the post-Stalinist revival of creative Marxism was Evald Ilyenkov, a philosopher who reasserted the Hegelian and dialectical aspects of Marx's thought. In his influential work The Dialectics of the Abstract and Concrete in Marx's 'Capital' (1960), Ilyenkov critiqued the positivist and empiricist interpretations of Marxism, arguing for a holistic understanding of reality where the concrete is a "unity in diversity". A central theme of Ilyenkov's philosophy was his reinterpretation of the concept of the "ideal". He argued that the ideal is not merely a subjective mental phenomenon but an objective reality, embodied in the material culture and social practices of humanity. According to Ilyenkov, the ideal exists not in individual consciousness but in the "sum total of social relationships", a view that challenged the orthodox Soviet interpretation of the ideal as a mere reflection of the material world. Ilyenkov's work had a significant impact on a new generation of Soviet philosophers and contributed to a deeper understanding of Marxist dialectics, but he faced constant pressure from the authorities and ultimately committed suicide in 1979.

As the creative "thaw" waned and Soviet society stagnated, Marxism increasingly became a tool for critiquing various ideologies rather than a constructive philosophical system. The era of perestroika in the 1980s saw a final, radical stage in this process. The most active critics of Marxism came from within the highest ranks of the Communist Party itself, including Aleksandr Yakovlev, a member of the Politburo who led the ideological dismantling of the system. While some revisionist thinkers attempted to rescue Marx's original ideas from their Stalinist "distortions", the critique that ultimately prevailed was a "merciless rejection of Marxism's entire premise," which came to be seen as the "culprit in all the crimes of the twentieth century."

== Core tenets ==
=== Conception of philosophy ===
Soviet dialectical materialism posited itself as a distinct philosophical discipline, rejecting both the positivist attempt to dissolve philosophy into the special sciences and the "Menshevizing idealist" view that reduced philosophy to a pure methodology. Instead, it was conceived as a combination of a "world-outlook" (mirovozzrenie) and a methodology, investigating the "most general laws of motion, change and development in Nature, society and knowledge" and providing a "unitary, scientific world-picture".

While claiming not to be a "science of sciences" standing above other disciplines, the doctrine functioned as a universal method, the "method of dialectical and historical materialism," which was said to penetrate all natural and social sciences and equip them with general principles of operation. This marked a break with Engels's more positivistic view, which suggested that what remains of philosophy after the development of the special sciences is only "the science of thought and its laws—formal logic and dialectics." Over time, Soviet philosophy saw a further retreat from Engels's position and a gradual reinstatement of individual philosophical disciplines, re-integrating nature and history into its scope and establishing disciplines such as the philosophy of science, philosophy of psychology, and others.

Two methodological principles were particularly characteristic of Soviet philosophy: the unity of theory and practice, and partisanship in philosophy. The demand for the unity of theory and practice originated in Marx's early writings, where he argued that philosophy must be "transcended" by being "actualized" in concrete, perceptible practice. In Leninism, this took the form of insisting that socialist theory must be brought to the workers' movement "from without" by the Communist Party. Theory became a "tremendous force" only when it was built up in "indissoluble connection with revolutionary practice." The Party's role was dual: it both generalized the experiences of the working class to develop theory, and it brought this theory back to the masses in the form of "clear-cut slogans and directives" to guide their practical struggle.

This led to the principle of partisanship (partiynost), which Lenin defined as the requirement to "openly adopt the standpoint of a definite social group". According to this doctrine, no "non-party, neutral philosophy" could exist in a class-divided society. Bourgeois philosophy was inherently partisan but concealed this under a mask of objectivity. Its purpose was to provide a distorted account of reality that served the interests of the exploiting class. Proletarian philosophy, by contrast, was openly partisan, because the class interests of the proletariat coincided with the objective laws of social development. Partisanship required loyal adherence to the Party line in all philosophical work and a relentless struggle against bourgeois ideology. During the "Zhdanovshchina" after World War II, this took the form of combatting "objectivism", "cosmopolitanism", and "servility towards bourgeois culture." This created what has been described as a "philosophical atmosphere" of a "godless theology," where philosophical inquiry was subordinated to political directives and consisted in the "unmasking of heresies".

=== Theory of matter ===
According to Gustav Wetter, Soviet dialectical materialism inherited from Engels a confusion between materialism and realism. The "great basic question of all philosophy," according to Engels, was the relation of thinking and being. This epistemological question was confounded with the ontological question of the relation of Spirit to Nature, or God to the world. Materialism was defined as the view that regarded Nature as primary, and as an independent reality that exists outside the mind. This hybrid meaning, which conflated materialism with realism, had a decisive effect on the subsequent history of the doctrine. Lenin's philosophical definition of matter—"objective reality which is given to man by his sensation"—was primarily a realist one. The definition was so broad that it could, in principle, encompass a spiritual being. However, Lenin converted this realism into an unambiguous materialism by confining reality to that which affects our sense organs and exists in space and time. Soviet philosophy held that the world is by its very nature material and that nothing exists apart from "matter in its perpetual change and motion."

The theory of the "material unity of the world" was said to be proved by a long development in philosophy and science, from Nicolaus Copernicus's heliocentric model to spectrum analysis and Michurinist biology (Lysenkoism). Matter and its "mode of existence," motion, were held to be eternal, uncreated, and indestructible, a view supposedly confirmed by the law of conservation of energy. This stood in some contrast to the thesis that the world's development is an ascending process, which implies a beginning. Motion was conceived as an essential and inseparable attribute of matter, its "self-movement" (samodvizhenie). This was crucial to avoid the need for an external prime mover, or God. Motion was understood not merely as mechanical change of place but as change in general, encompassing higher forms such as heat, electricity, chemical change, life, and thought, none of which could be simply reduced to the lower forms. Space and time were considered objective forms of the existence of matter, inseparable from it. There was no matter without space and time, and no space and time without matter.

=== The laws of dialectics ===
In the Soviet view, the essence of the materialist dialectic was summed up by Engels in three basic laws:

1. The law of the transformation of quantity into quality and vice versa.
2. The law of the mutual interpenetration of opposites.
3. The law of the negation of the negation.

Until the 1930s, this formulation was common in Soviet philosophy, with the law of the unity of opposites usually placed first, reflecting the importance Lenin attached to it as the source of motion. In his 1938 essay, Stalin omitted the law of the negation of the negation and laid down four "principal features of the Marxist dialectical method":

1. The general connection between phenomena in Nature and society.
2. Movement and development in Nature and society.
3. Development as a transition from quantitative changes into qualitative ones.
4. Development as a struggle of opposites.

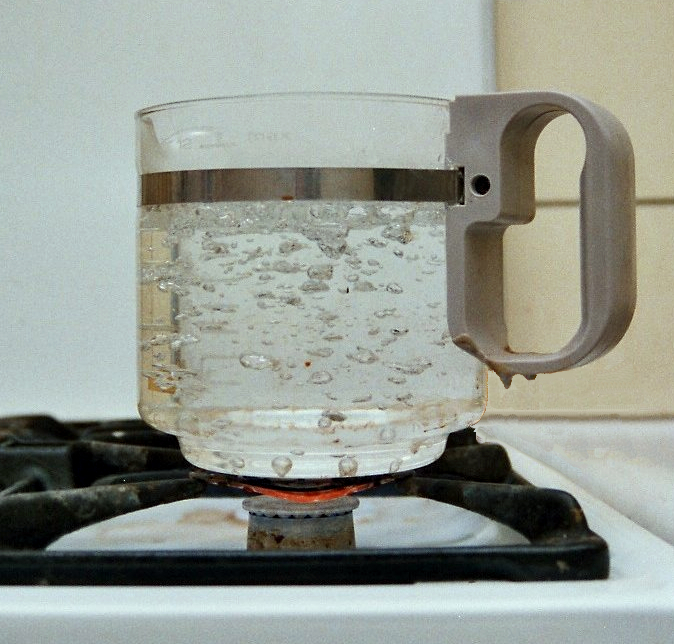
An illustration of quantity transforming into quality: a gradual increase in heat results in a sudden "leap" from liquid water to steam.

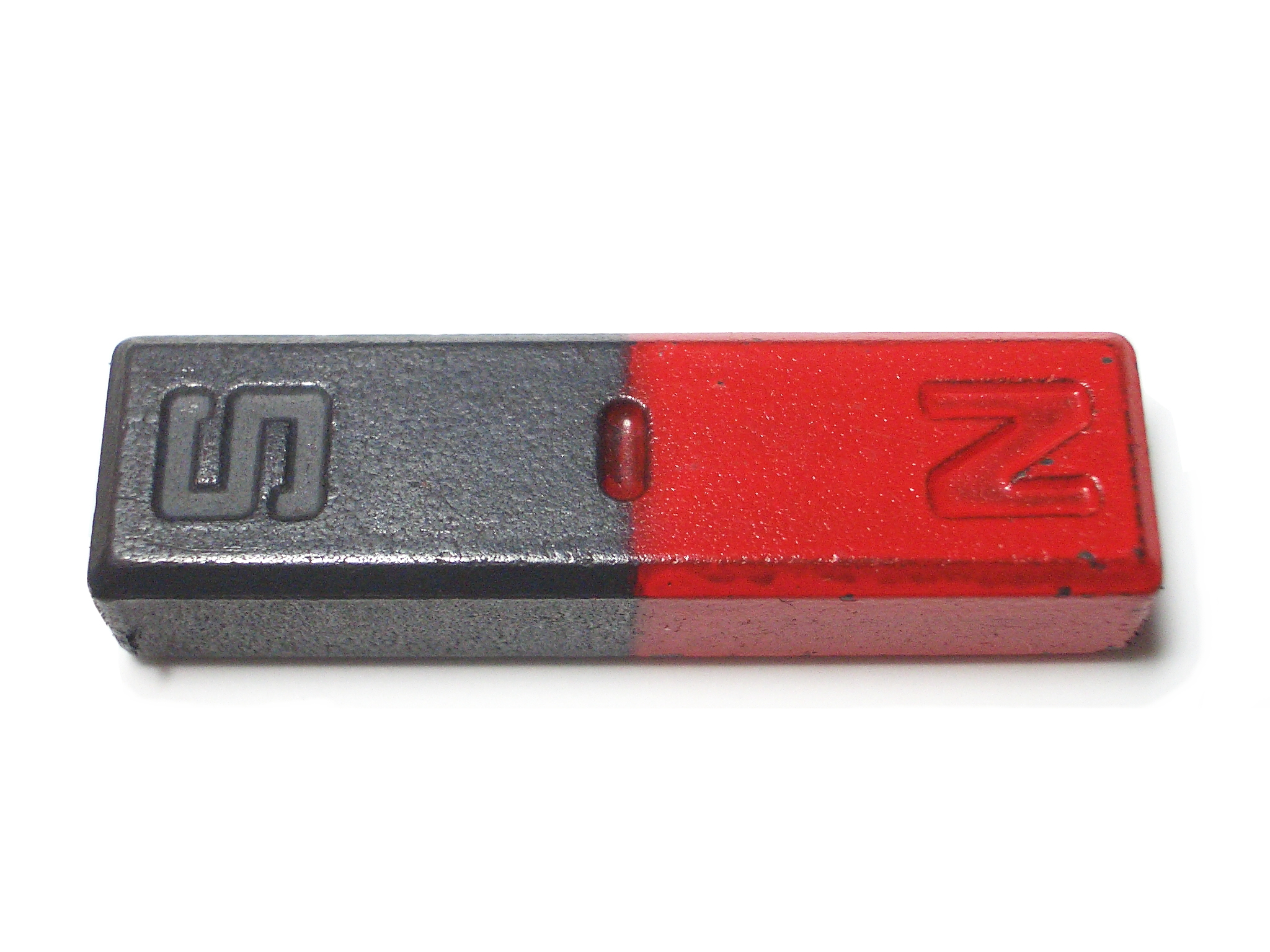
A model for the interpenetration of opposites: a magnet's north and south poles are contradictory yet inseparable, existing only in unity.

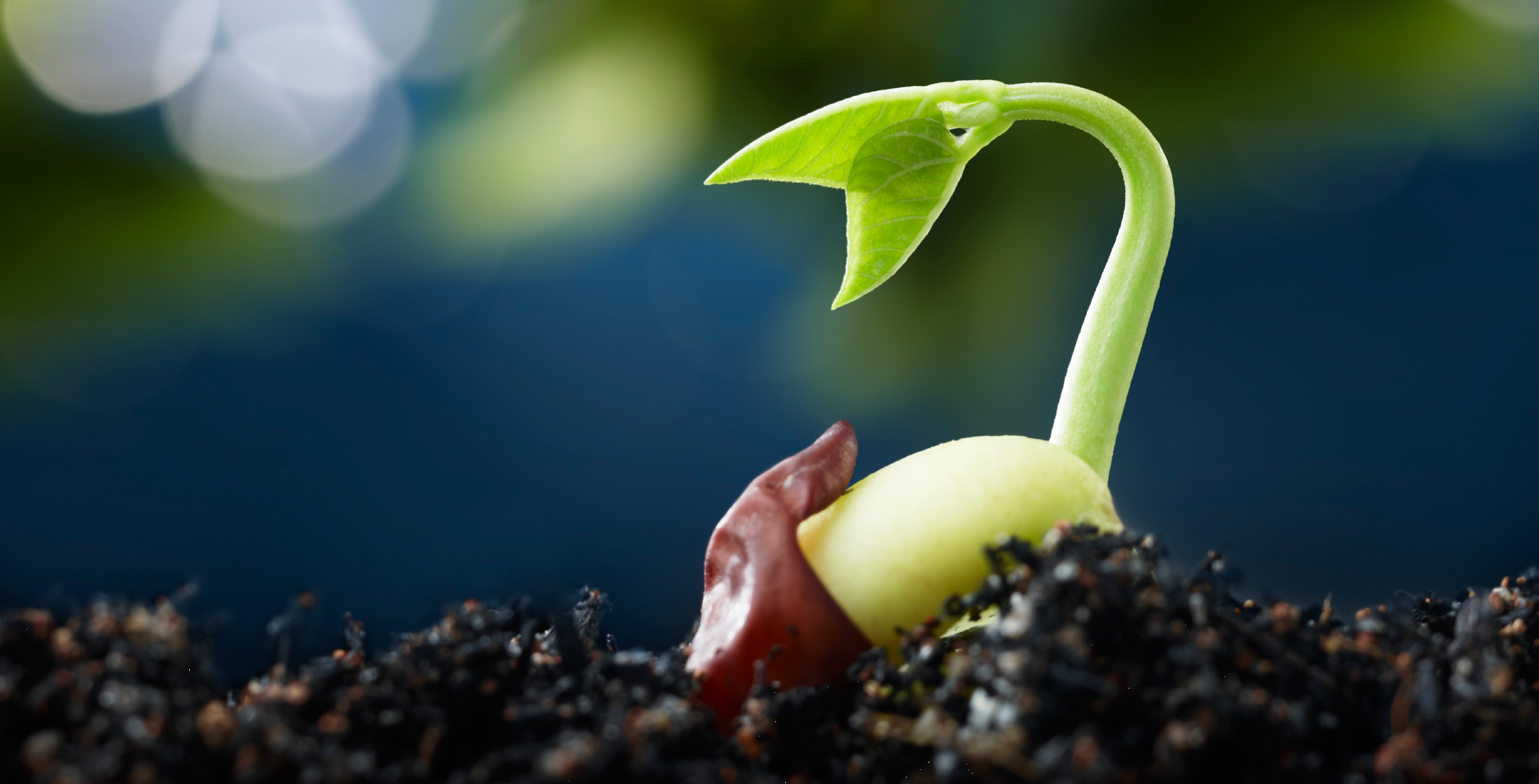
An example of the negation of the negation: the seed is negated by the plant, which is itself negated to produce a multitude of new seeds.

The law of the transformation of quantity into quality held that development proceeds through the gradual accumulation of small, imperceptible quantitative changes, which at a certain point leads to a rapid, abrupt qualitative change, or "leap". This provided a philosophical justification for the concept of revolution. To avoid the implication that the Soviet order must also be advanced by a revolution, Stalin introduced a distinction between a sudden, violent "explosion" (vzryv), which applies only in class-divided societies, and a gradual transition, which occurs in a classless socialist society.

The law of the unity and struggle of opposites was considered the central principle of dialectics. It held that all things contain internal contradictions, which are the source of their "self-movement". Lenin declared that the "struggle of mutually exclusive opposites is absolute, just as development and motion are absolute," while their unity is "conditional, temporary, transitory, relative." This was later modified by Stalin, who argued in his writings on linguistics that, however sharp the class struggle, it cannot lead to the disintegration of society, because society is also held together by a real unity. The distinction was also made between "antagonistic" contradictions (founded on the irreconcilable interests of hostile classes) and "non-antagonistic" contradictions (which exist in socialist society). The former were resolved in violent collision, while the latter were resolved through criticism and self-criticism.

The law of the negation of the negation described the tendency and direction of development. The dialectical process followed an ascending spiral, where a first negation is "transcended" by a second, preserving what was positive in the previous stage and returning, in appearance, to the starting point, but on a higher level. After being omitted by Stalin, this law was "rehabilitated" in the post-Stalin era.

=== Theory of knowledge ===
The dialectical materialist theory of knowledge was based on the "copy-theory" (teoriia otrazheniia), which held that human consciousness reflects the external world. The knowing process proceeded in two dialectical phases: from living intuition or sensory perception to abstract, logical thought; and from abstract thought to practice.

Sensation was the result of external objects acting on the sense-organs, a "transformation of the energy of external excitation into a state of consciousness." Unlike "physiological idealism", which held that sensations are purely subjective, or Plekhanov's "hieroglyphic theory", which regarded them as mere symbols, Soviet philosophy maintained that sensations were "truthful reflections" of objective properties, though subjective in form. From sensation, knowledge ascended to the "logical stage" of abstract concepts. This transition was a qualitative leap. Logical knowledge penetrated to the "essence" of things, to the "inner connection of appearances according to law." The unity of sensory and rational knowledge was held to overcome the one-sidedness of both empiricism and rationalism.

Practice was the foundation of the entire knowing process and the ultimate criterion of truth. Soviet philosophy distinguished between objective, relative, and absolute truth. Objective truth was "the content of human thought ... which is in conformity with objects, and is thus independent of the subject." Truth was a process of progressive approximation toward absolute truth, which was the "sum-total of relative truths." While it was held that absolute truth will never be fully attained by mankind, it was also asserted that "for objective dialectics there is an absolute even within the relative" and that the fundamental theses of Marxism-Leninism are "absolute truths."

=== Logic and theory of categories ===
According to Lenin, dialectics, logic, and the theory of knowledge were identical. This thesis, borrowed from Hegel, was justified on the grounds that the logical laws of thought are copies of the objective laws of nature, and that the subject-matter of logic is the historical development of human thought, which reflects the historical development of the objective world. This led to a prolonged controversy in Soviet philosophy over the status of traditional formal logic. In the 1930s, formal logic was dismissed as "metaphysical." During World War II, Stalin initiated a rehabilitation, arguing that it was a necessary tool for rational thought; a Soviet textbook on the subject was written by Arnost Kolman in 1941. After 1946, a dualist position was adopted, which held that formal logic is the science of the elementary laws of thought, while dialectical logic is the science of its higher laws.

The categories of dialectical materialism were its basic logical concepts, reflecting the most general properties and relations of reality. The main categories included: essence and appearance; cause and effect; necessity and contingency; form and content; and possibility and actuality. In the Stalinist period, the theory of categories was largely neglected, with the categories being treated as subordinate aspects of the four "principal features" of the dialectic. After Stalin's death, there was a renewed effort to develop a systematic theory of categories.

== Interpretations and critique ==
=== Engels debate and critiques of Soviet "diamat" ===
The formalization of dialectical materialism gave rise to a long-running debate, particularly concerning the role of Friedrich Engels. The controversy began in socialist circles in the 1890s with critiques from figures like Eduard Bernstein, but it became a central issue with the publication of Georg Lukács's History and Class Consciousness in 1923. Lukács famously argued that "Engels—following Hegel’s mistaken lead—extended the [dialectical] method also to the knowledge of nature," a move he considered illegitimate. He maintained that the crucial determinants of dialectics—such as the interaction of subject and object and the unity of theory and practice—were absent from the natural world. In the Communist International, the works of Lukács and Karl Korsch were condemned for their rejection of the dialectics of nature and their "Menshevizing idealist" tendencies. This initiated the "Engels debate", which has often framed subsequent interpretations of Marxism. Critics in the Western Marxist tradition, such as Herbert Marcuse and Jean-Paul Sartre, have argued that Engels distorted Marx's thought by introducing a positivist and metaphysical "dialectics of nature" that was alien to Marx's own humanistic and critical method. Another tradition of British and French Marxist scientists, including J. D. Bernal, J. B. S. Haldane, and Paul Langevin, vigorously defended the dialectics of nature, viewing it as an integral part of a comprehensive, scientific worldview.

According to Z. A. Jordan, the historical development of dialectical materialism from Engels to Stalin marked a transition from a cognitive, metaphysical project to a "political cosmology". Engels's original formulation was a genuine attempt to create a metaphysical theory of the universe that would reflect the nature of the physical world. Plekhanov began the process of subordinating this cosmology to political and social considerations. In Lenin's work, cosmology gives way to a "socio-cosmic" worldview, and in Stalin's, it becomes a purely political tool, an instrument for justifying practical decisions and maintaining ideological control. This evolution produced two distinct conceptions of dialectical materialism. The "minimalistic" conception, represented by Engels, is a set of metaphysical presuppositions intended to provide a foundation for an empirical theory of social and historical development. The "maximalistic" conception, initiated by Lenin and completed by Stalin, elevates the laws of dialectics to the status of ultimate laws of a nature, from which all other laws can be derived. In this view, the validity of all knowledge is determined by its compatibility with these fundamental laws, and the philosophical interpretation of science is transferred to the jurisdiction of political authority.

Gustav Wetter argues that Soviet dialectical materialism is an "eclectic medley" of diverse elements, often borrowed from philosophical positions at variance with one another. He identifies a fundamental contradiction within the system between its dialectical component and its materialist dogma. The dialectical aspect acknowledges qualitative distinctions and the emergence of higher, spiritual forms of existence, while the materialist aspect denies the existence of anything beyond matter. This contradiction, he suggests, poisons the entire system and leads to a "continual self-violation of the causal principle". Wetter also highlights the "religious" character of the system, with its "classics" functioning as "holy scriptures", the Communist Party as an infallible "church", and the dialectic itself serving as an element of "mysticism" that enabled Marxism to achieve such success in Russia.

=== Recent interpretations and re-evaluations ===
Within Western Marxism, the "Engels question" prompted a more nuanced engagement with the problem of nature. Lukács, in his later years, repudiated his earlier rejection of the dialectics of nature, conceding that he had violated the "very roots of Marxian ontology" by treating nature as a purely social category. This later self-critique, however, did not fully resolve the Kantian-style dualism in his thought between the social and natural realms. In recent decades, the growth of Marxist ecology has led to a renewed defence of the dialectics of nature, arguing that it is essential for understanding the complex, co-evolutionary relationship between society and nature. This perspective seeks to recover the "natural praxis" and Epicurean materialism in Marx's own thought, which sees human beings as "a part of nature" engaged in a "metabolic exchange" with their environment.

Other recent interpretations, such as that of Bertell Ollman, have re-focused on Marx's own writings, presenting his dialectic not as a set of metaphysical laws but as a practical method of inquiry and exposition. Ollman argues that many long-standing interpretive debates in Marxism—such as those on crisis theory or the nature of the capitalist state (e.g., the Miliband–Poulantzas debate)—are the result of the participants using different, unacknowledged "abstractions". Different thinkers may be focusing on different levels of generality or viewing the same issue from different vantage points (such as that of the ruling class versus that of socioeconomic structures) without being aware of it, leading to seemingly irreconcilable disagreements.

Another significant line of interpretation distinguishes between "historical dialectic" and "systematic dialectic". Alfred Schmidt, in his analysis of pre-capitalist societies, argues that their history has a "nature-like" or "elemental" character, and that only with the emergence of capitalism does a truly "historical" dialectic of productive forces and relations of production come into being. Similarly, critics like Christopher Arthur argue that Engels's "logical-historical" method, which presents the categories of Capital as a reflection of historical development, was a misreading of both Marx and Hegel. According to this view, Marx's major works, like Hegel's, employ a "systematic dialectic". This method does not trace a historical sequence but instead reconstructs the conceptual structure of a "given whole"—such as the capitalist mode of production—by tracing the "logic of mutual presupposition" among its constituent parts or "moments".

== See also ==
- Alexander Spirkin
- Chinese Marxist philosophy
- Dialectical Materialism and Historical Materialism
- Dialectical monism
- Fundamentals of Marxism–Leninism
- Ludovico Geymonat
- Maurice Cornforth
- Methodological naturalism
- Parametric determinism
- Shulamith Firestone
- Teodor Oizerman
