= Dialectics of Nature =

Work by Friedrich Engels, written 1873–1886

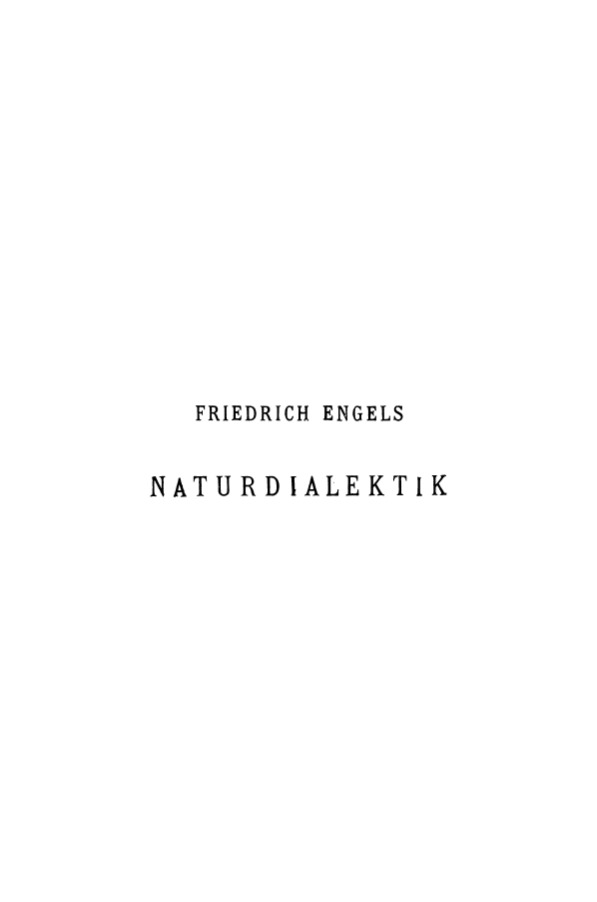
- Title page, as published in Marx-Engels Archive in 1925
- Author: Friedrich Engels
- Original title: Dialektik der Natur
- Language: German
- Subject: Philosophy of science, Dialectical materialism, Natural philosophy
- Published: 1925
- Publisher: Marx-Engels Institute
- Publication place: Soviet Union
- The work was written in 1873–1886 and published posthumously.

Dialectics of Nature (German: Dialektik der Natur) is an unfinished work by Friedrich Engels written between 1873 and 1886. In it, Engels applied the principles of dialectical materialism, as conceived by himself and Karl Marx, to the natural sciences. The work was never published in his lifetime and first appeared in a bilingual German and Russian edition in the Soviet Union in 1925.

The book comprises a series of manuscripts, notes, and fragments that outline a materialist dialectical view of nature. Central to this view are what Engels identified as the three general laws of dialectics: the law of the transformation of quantity into quality, the law of the interpenetration of opposites, and the law of the negation of the negation. Engels sought to demonstrate that these laws, which he and Marx had identified in history and society, were also applicable to the natural world.

Since its publication, Dialectics of Nature has been a subject of intense controversy within Marxism. It became a foundational text for the official Soviet philosophy of dialectical materialism. However, it was heavily criticized by other Marxists, particularly those associated with Western Marxism, who argued that Engels had distorted Marx's thought by extending dialectics beyond the social and historical realm into nature. The debate over the text's legitimacy and its relationship to Marx's work, known as the "Engels problem", remains a significant topic in Marxist scholarship.

== Background and motivations ==
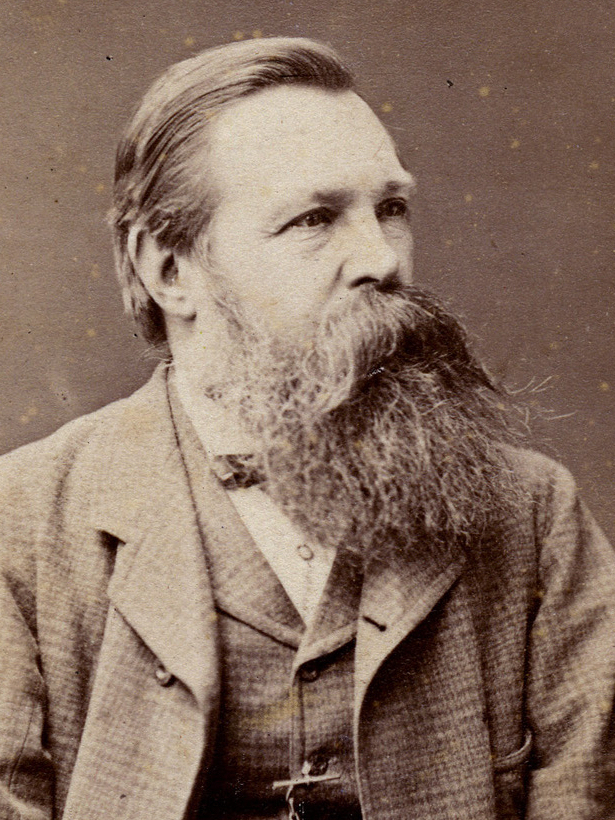
Friedrich Engels

Friedrich Engels began the work that would become Dialectics of Nature with the aim of demonstrating the applicability of the materialist dialectical method, which he and Karl Marx had developed for social and historical analysis, to the natural sciences. This undertaking was part of a larger project to establish a comprehensive and coherent worldview for the socialist movement, blending theory and practice. Engels believed that a scientific theory was necessary to guide political action, and philosophy's role was to provide the fundamental framework for that theory.

Engels identified several key motivations for his project. First, he sought to counter a growing anti-philosophical trend among natural scientists, who, in his view, often unknowingly relied on outdated and flawed metaphysical assumptions. He argued that scientists could not "make any headway without thought" and that they were always "under the domination of philosophy". The only choice was whether to be dominated by a "bad, fashionable philosophy" or a form of theoretical thinking grounded in the history of thought.

Second, Engels aimed to critique and overcome what he called "the old metaphysical mode of thinking," which viewed the world as static and composed of fixed, isolated entities. In its place, he proposed a dialectical view of nature as a system of interconnected processes in constant motion, change, and development.

Third, the project was a critical engagement with German idealism, particularly the philosophy of Georg Wilhelm Friedrich Hegel. Engels's goal was to "rescue conscious dialectics from German idealist philosophy" by stripping it of its "mystic form" and re-establishing it on a materialist basis. This involved "reversing" Hegel's idealist system, which gave primacy to thought (the "Idea"), and instead asserting the primacy of the material world (nature). This undertaking was also seen as a continuation of Marx's own unrealized plan to write a separate work on dialectics to clarify his method.

== Writing process and structure ==
Dialectics of Nature is not a finished book but rather a collection of manuscripts, notes, excerpts, and fragments written over a period of 13 years, from 1873 to 1886. The title itself was not definitively sanctioned by Engels but was written on one of four folders he used to organize the material. The project remained an unfinished "torso", as Engels's time was increasingly occupied with editing the second and third volumes of Marx's Capital after Marx's death in 1883.

According to historian Sven-Eric Liedman, Engels's work on the project can be divided into four main periods:

1. First phase (c. 1858–1873): Engels's interest in the natural sciences intensified in the late 1850s. In a July 1858 letter to Marx, he discussed new developments in physiology and physics, particularly the theory of the "correlation of forces" (an early formulation of the conservation of energy), which he saw as providing empirical evidence for Hegelian dialectics. This letter marked the beginning of his sustained effort to connect the natural sciences with Hegel's philosophy. This was a period of general interest during which Engels read natural scientific and philosophical literature and commented on it in letters, but made no significant excerpts or systematic studies.
2. Second phase (1873–1876): This phase began with a letter to Marx on 30 May 1873, in which Engels first announced his plan for a "dialectic of the natural sciences". He began to systematize his studies, focusing on how Hegel's natural philosophy was confirmed by new scientific discoveries. His main themes were the fluidity of categories and the various forms of motion.
3. Third phase (1876–1883): The work was interrupted by Engels's polemic against Eugen Dühring, which became the book Anti-Dühring (1878). This polemic compelled Engels to engage more systematically with the place of Marxist theory in the scientific hierarchy. It was in this period that he developed the concept of the three "dialectical laws", inspired by a similar term used by Marx in Capital and by the need to defend Marx's method against Dühring.
4. Fourth phase (post-1883): After Marx's death, Engels was forced to abandon the major project to focus on editing Capital. He returned to the philosophical themes in a few smaller works, such as Ludwig Feuerbach and the End of Classical German Philosophy (1886) and studies of the new anthropology.

According to scholar Kaan Kangal, the collection should not be seen as a single, unified project but as a series of at least seven distinct but interconnected projects undertaken between 1873 and 1886. These projects are characterized by different organizational plans and evolving philosophical focus. The main phases of Engels's work include:

1. The initial Naturdialektik project (1873–1876), which consists of the first 94 manuscript fragments. This stage established the core themes of the entire undertaking.
2. The Plan 1878, drafted around the time Engels completed Anti-Dühring. This plan outlines a comprehensive book on dialectics and the natural sciences, beginning with a historical introduction and then detailing the laws of dialectics and their application across various scientific fields.
3. The Plan 1880, which represents a significant shift in focus. Here, Engels narrowed his scope to the physical forms of motion, and dialectical terminology became less prominent. This suggests a strategic choice to focus on a more manageable aspect of the project.
4. The final rearrangement into four folders (c. 1886), which Engels undertook after Marx's death. The titles of these folders—"Dialectics and Natural Science", "Natural Research and Dialectics", "Dialectics of Nature", and "Math[ematics] and Natural S[cience] Diversa"—and their contents suggest that Engels may have abandoned the idea of a single book in favor of writing four shorter, more focused articles.

== Sources and influences ==
Engels's project drew on a wide range of scientific and philosophical sources, reflecting both his broad intellectual curiosity and the specific debates of his time. His approach to these sources varied significantly depending on the field.

For philosophy, Engels relied primarily on his early schooling in German idealism, especially Hegel, whom he treated as his main authority in developing the dialectic. He largely dismissed contemporary system-builders such as Herbert Spencer and showed little interest in neo-Kantian thinkers like Friedrich Albert Lange. In chemistry, he had a "living textbook" in his close friend and collaborator Carl Schorlemmer, an internationally recognized chemist and fellow communist. Schorlemmer provided Engels with direct access to contemporary developments in the field, particularly concerning organic chemistry and the debate over the relationship between different forms of motion.

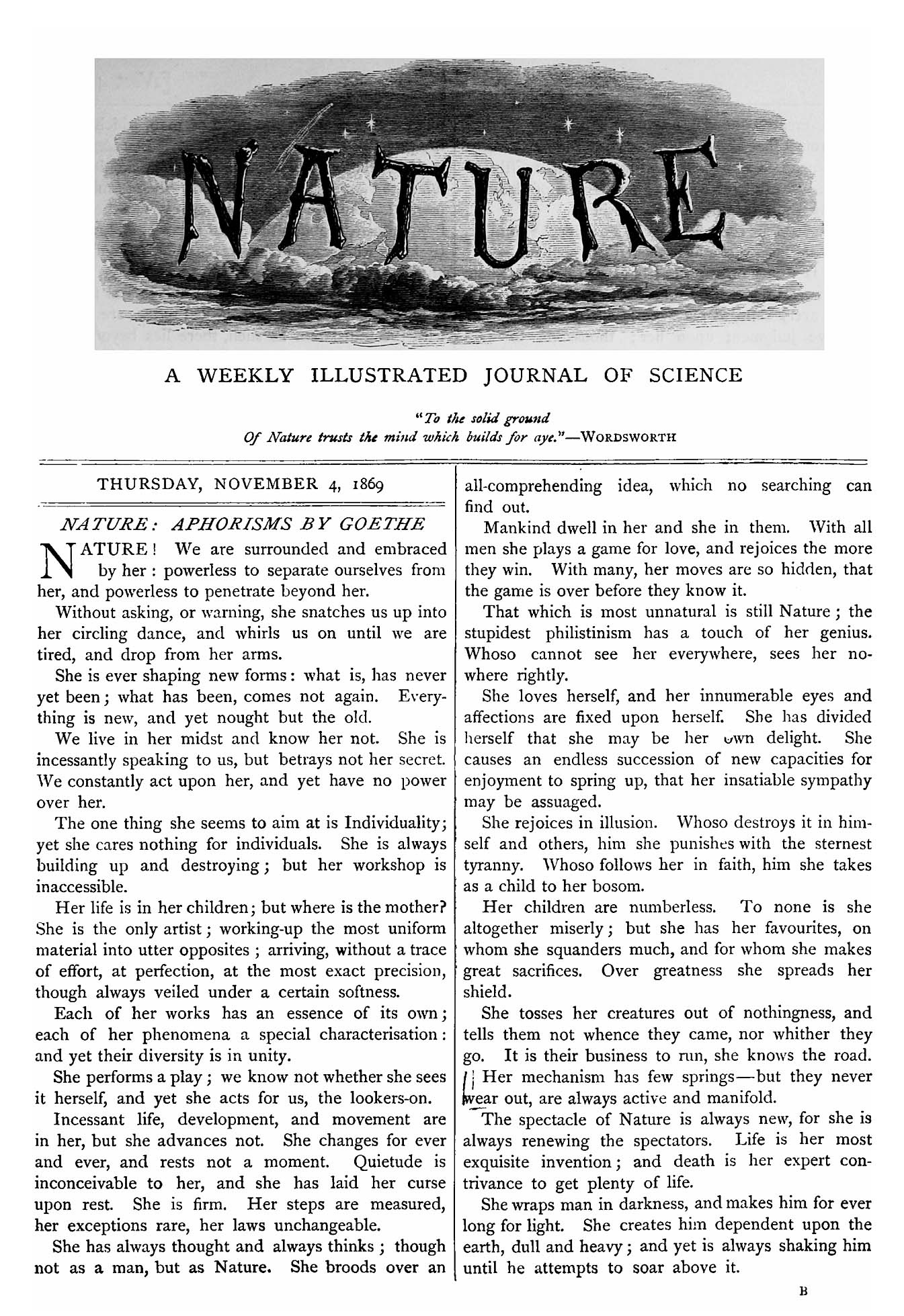
Cover of the first issue of the journal Nature, 1869

For the natural sciences more broadly, Engels's primary window was the popular scientific journal Nature, which he began reading consistently in the early 1870s. The journal provided him with information on major textbooks, public lectures, and scientific controversies, particularly in physics and biology. Through Nature and other reading, he engaged with the works of prominent scientists such as Hermann von Helmholtz, William Robert Grove, James Clerk Maxwell, William Thomson (Lord Kelvin), and Charles Darwin. In the human sciences, Engels relied on Marx's Capital as his primary authoritative source.

While Engels engaged with a wide array of scientific material, his method was that of a critical observer from the outside. He did not consult specialist journals and was less interested in detailed empirical problems than in the grand theoretical and philosophical conclusions that could be drawn from scientific discoveries. His work was thus shaped by the ongoing debates about scientific ideals, determinism, and the relationship between different fields of knowledge that characterized the intellectual climate of the late 19th century.

== Contents and philosophical ideas ==
=== The laws of dialectics ===
At the core of Dialectics of Nature is Engels's attempt to formulate the general laws of dialectics that, he argued, govern development in nature, society, and human thought. While the number and formulation of these laws vary slightly across the manuscripts, the most systematic version, found in the manuscript titled "Dialectics", reduces them to three main laws:

1. The law of the transformation of quantity into quality and vice versa.
2. The law of the interpenetration of opposites.
3. The law of the negation of the negation.

These laws were intended to describe the universal patterns of motion and change. The first law describes how gradual quantitative changes can lead to sudden qualitative leaps (e.g., water boiling at 100°C). The second law posits that all things contain internal contradictions or "polar opposites" whose struggle drives development. The third law describes a developmental process whereby a state is negated or overcome, only to be followed by a further negation that leads to a higher-level synthesis. An earlier outline, the Plan 1878, included a fourth law, the "spiral form of development," which was later subsumed under the law of the negation of the negation.

=== Engagement with philosophy ===
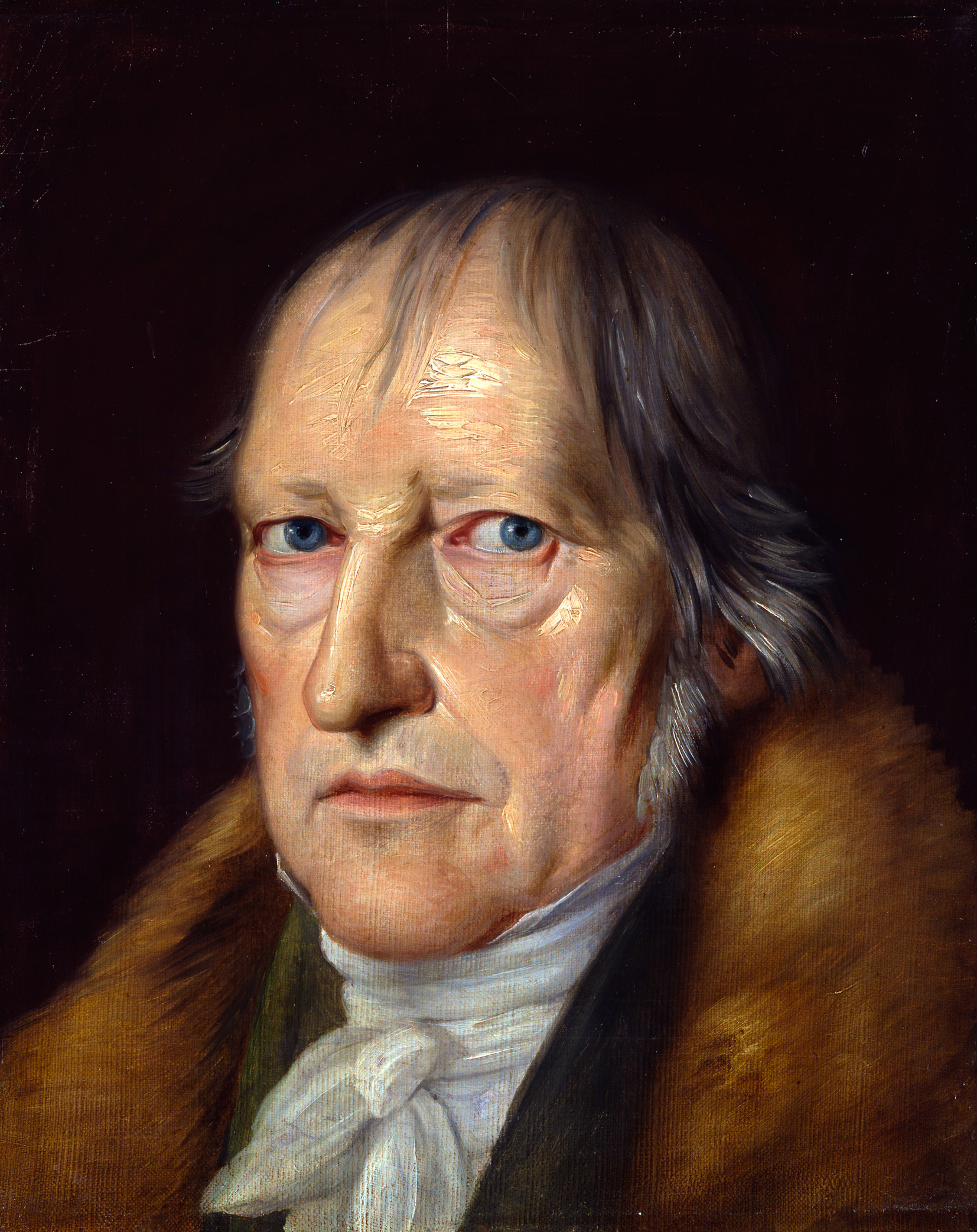
Georg Friedrich Wilhelm Hegel

Engels sought to extract Hegel's dialectical method from its idealist framework, focusing particularly on the first two parts of Hegel's Science of Logic (the Logic of Being and the Logic of Essence). Engels praised Hegel for being the first to depict "the whole natural, historical and intellectual world as a process" of constant motion and development. However, he criticized Hegel's idealism, arguing that Hegel's logical categories were not manifestations of a pre-existing "Idea" but were reflections of the material world.

Engels also posited an "Aristotle-Hegel alignment", claiming that Aristotle and Hegel were the only two thinkers to have thoroughly investigated dialectics. Conversely, he was highly critical of Immanuel Kant, largely dismissing his dialectics as a "uselessly laborious and little-remunerative task" due to Kant's concept of the unknowable "thing-in-itself". Engels followed Hegel in arguing that things are knowable through their properties and their interactions with other things.

Engels framed his project as a defense of materialism against idealism and of dialectics against metaphysics. He viewed metaphysics as a mode of thought that treats concepts as "fixed, rigid, given once for all," whereas dialectics grasps them in their interconnection, development, and transition from one to another. However, Kaan Kangal argues that Engels's position is philosophically ambiguous. While Engels attacks "metaphysics" wholesale, his arguments often align with what Hegel would consider a revised, critical metaphysics. Similarly, while rejecting "idealism", Engels's own conception of an infinitely self-developing totality shares structural features with Hegel's objective idealism, suggesting that materialism and idealism might be "frenemies" rather than irreconcilable opposites.

Engels's scattered and often contradictory statements on the relationship between theory and empirical reality reveal an internal tension in his philosophical project. Liedman identifies three distinct, and sometimes conflicting, tendencies in his thought:

1. A positivist tendency, in which theory and dialectical laws are seen as passive summaries or empirical generalizations abstracted from given facts. In this view, scientific progress is primarily an accumulation of observations, and the dialectic serves as a tool for organizing these observations.
2. A Hegelian tendency, which emerges most clearly in his treatment of logic. Here, Engels follows Hegel in distinguishing between formal logic and dialectical logic, treating the latter as the "laws of thought" that govern the development of concepts.
3. A dialectical materialist tendency, which represents Engels's most original contribution and the intended synthesis of the other two. In this view, knowledge is neither a passive reflection of reality nor a purely conceptual construction. Instead, it is an active process in which theory engages with and transforms empirical material. This conception is structurally similar to the Marxist theory of history, where a "dominant moment" (such as the economic base) determines the overall structure of a totality without negating the reciprocal interaction of its parts.

=== Materialism and the hierarchy of sciences ===
Engels's ontology is grounded in what Liedman calls "irreductive materialism". Against mechanical materialism, which sought to reduce all phenomena to the laws of mechanics, Engels argued that reality is composed of qualitatively distinct but interconnected levels of "matter in motion". Each level—from mechanics to physics, chemistry, biology, and human history—has its own specific qualities and laws that cannot be entirely reduced to the level below it. A "qualitative leap" marks the transition from one level to the next (e.g., from inorganic to organic matter).

This view allowed Engels to maintain a materialist foundation for all science while rejecting the reductionism of thinkers like Ludwig Büchner. However, it also created a tension in his thought. His commitment to the fundamental principles of materialism, such as the eternity of matter and motion, sometimes conflicted with his acceptance of developmental theories in science, such as the second law of thermodynamics (which implied a "heat death of the universe") and Darwin's theory of evolution (which pointed to an irreversible development of life).

== Publication history ==
Engels never organized the manuscripts for publication. After his death in 1895, the papers were left in the archives of the Social Democratic Party of Germany. Eduard Bernstein, who was entrusted with the manuscripts, published two short articles from the collection but did not believe the rest was suitable for publication, partly due to a negative assessments from physicist Leo Arons and from Albert Einstein, who in 1924 judged the content to be of "no special interest, either from the point of view of modern physics or even for the history of physics".

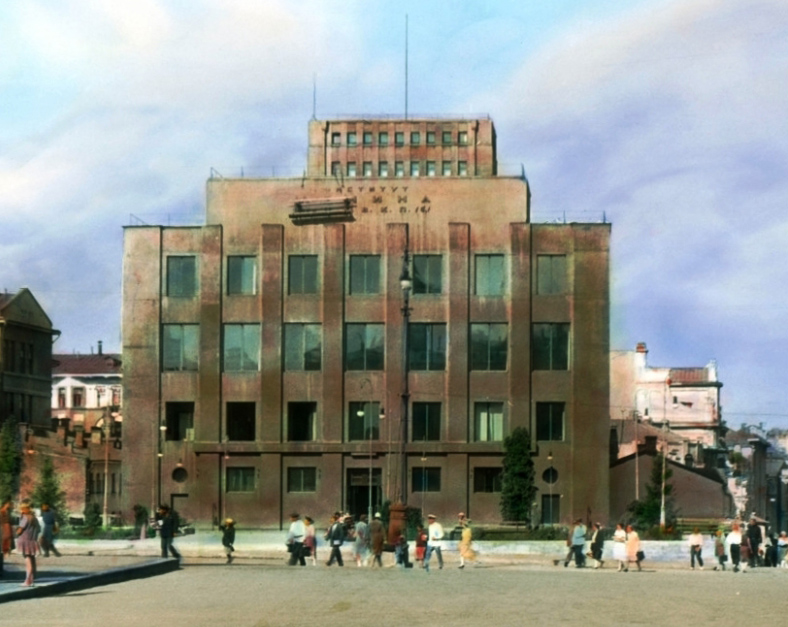
Marx-Engels Institute building in Moscow, 1931

The manuscripts were eventually acquired by David Riazanov, director of the Marx-Engels Institute in Moscow. They were published for the first time in 1925 in the Soviet journal Marx-Engels Archive, in a bilingual edition with the original German text and a Russian translation.

The editorial history of the work is complex. Subsequent editions presented the material in different arrangements, often creating the impression of a more finished and coherent book than the original manuscripts suggest.

- The 1927 German edition, edited by Riazanov, organized the fragments chronologically.
- The 1935 edition, prepared by Vladimir Adoratsky, rearranged the texts thematically, opening with the "Articles on Dialectics of Nature" and grouping earlier notes separately. This edition became the basis for many subsequent translations.
- Later editions, such as those in the Marx-Engels-Werke (MEW) and Marx/Engels Collected Works (MECW), continued to present different arrangements, reflecting ongoing editorial and political debates about the text's structure and meaning.

== Reception and controversies ==
Since its publication, Dialectics of Nature has been one of the most contentious texts in the Marxist tradition. Its reception has been deeply polarized, turning the work into what Kaan Kangal calls a "battlefield" for competing interpretations of Marxism.

=== Early debates and the Lukács controversy ===
The core philosophical issues addressed by Engels—such as the applicability of dialectics to nature and the existence of real contradictions—were already subjects of debate among socialists before the book's publication. Figures like Eduard Bernstein, Karl Kautsky, and Georgi Plekhanov had advanced differing views on the role of Hegelian dialectics within Marxism.

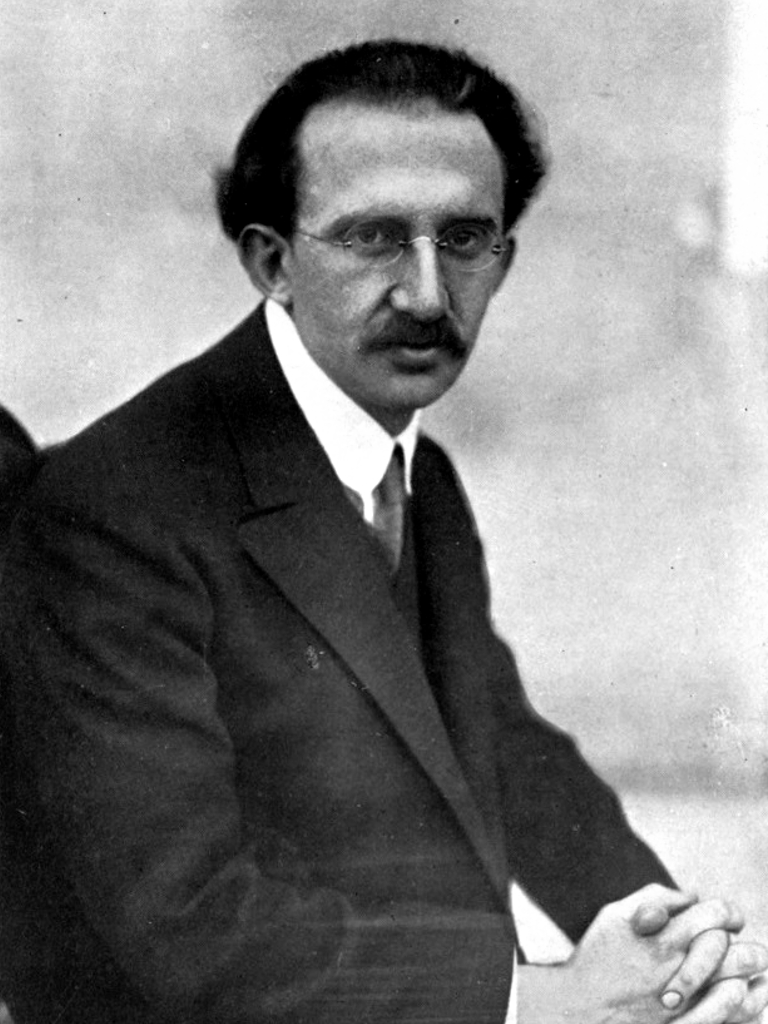
Georg Lukács

The controversy intensified with the publication of Georg Lukács's History and Class Consciousness in 1923. In a famous footnote, Lukács asserted that Engels, "following Hegel's mistaken lead," had wrongly extended the dialectical method "to the knowledge of nature". For Lukács, dialectics was exclusively a method for understanding society and history, characterized by the interaction of subject and object, which was absent in nature. This critique became a foundational tenet of Western Marxism, which sought to distance itself from what it saw as the positivism of Soviet ideology.

In the Soviet Union, the publication of Dialectics of Nature in 1925 sparked a major philosophical debate between two factions: the "Mechanists" and the "Deborinites". The Mechanists, such as Ivan Skvortsov-Stepanov, argued that philosophy should be subordinated to the natural sciences and interpreted Engels's work through a reductionist lens. The Deborinites, led by Abram Deborin, defended philosophy as a distinct discipline and embraced the Hegelian dimensions of Engels's thought. The Deborinites initially prevailed, but by the early 1930s, they were condemned for "Menshevizing idealism" by Joseph Stalin's supporters. The outcome was the consolidation of an official, dogmatic version of "dialectical materialism" that drew heavily on Engels's formulations.

=== The Engels problem ===
In the post–World War II era, particularly in the Anglophone world, the critique of Dialectics of Nature became central to the "Engels problem"—the argument that Engels had fundamentally distorted Marx's original ideas. Thinkers such as Sidney Hook, Leszek Kołakowski, and Shlomo Avineri argued that Marx's thought was a critical theory of society, rooted in human practice and history. They contended that Engels transformed this theory into a positivistic and metaphysical "worldview" by applying its concepts to nature. On this view, Engels's "dialectical materialism" was a deviation that paved the way for the dogmatism of Soviet Marxism.

This interpretation has been challenged by other scholars who defend the continuity between Marx and Engels, pointing to Marx's own interest in the natural sciences and his endorsement of Engels's work. Proponents of Engels's work argue that a dialectical understanding of nature is essential for a consistent materialist philosophy and provides a necessary foundation for understanding the relationship between humanity and the natural world. The work remains an unfinished but influential "torso" whose interpretation continues to shape debates within Marxism.
