= Dialectical and Historical Materialism =

Theoretical text by Joseph Stalin

Dialectical and Historical Materialism (Russian: О диалектическом и историческом материализме), attributed to Joseph Stalin, is a central text within the Soviet Union's political theory Marxism–Leninism.

The work first appeared as a chapter in the Short History of the Communist Party of the Soviet Union, which drew heavily from the philosophical works of Georg Wilhelm Friedrich Hegel, Karl Marx, Friedrich Engels, and Vladimir Lenin. It describes the Bolshevik Party's official doctrine on dialectical materialism and historical materialism.

== Background ==
This chapter was written by Stalin's secretaries under his personal guidance during his consolidation of power in the party through the purging of party members, and implementing structural changes by introducing a new constitution in 1936. Anton Donoso notes that "there is disagreement as to whether Stalin even wrote the work. Soviet and East-European Marxists, from what has been told to me, think Mitin himself is the author." Following these measures, Stalin decided to develop a new history of the Bolshevik Party corresponding to the Moscow Trials narrative in order to further consolidate and legitimize his regime. While the other chapters of a Short History of the Communist Party of the Soviet Union were written by a committee under the guidance of Stalin, Anton Donoso argues that it was imperative that Stalin himself write the chapter on dialectical and historical materialism, for "it would have been the most dangerous portion of the history to have been entrusted to a subordinate."

Stalin's contributions to Marxist philosophy prior to this chapter were scant. His previous notable works were Anarchism or Socialism? in 1906/7, as well as his more popular Marxism and the National Question, also known as The National Question and Social Democracy in 1913. After Lenin's death, Stalin also delivered lectures on Leninism in 1924, which were then developed into the work Foundations of Leninism.

In 1929 Stalin was first concerned with the interpretation of dialectical materialism, when, according to Donoso, he complained in a speech that theoreticians "had not kept pace with the practical developments of Marxism in the Soviet Union," and "accused philosophers in general of dragging their feet in the battle on the two fronts against Rightist and Leftist deviation." In 1931, Stalin was successful in having the Central Committee condemn differing interpretations of Marxist philosophy, marking a decisive turning point in Soviet philosophy and thus abolishing any opposition to the official party line. Additionally, included in the 1936 constitution was a criticism of philosophy as being out of date, abstract, and too "polluted" with quotations from "deviationists," such as Trotsky.

== Synopsis ==
Stalin's writing is systematically presented and divided into three parts:

=== Part I: outline of the Marxist dialectical method, in contrast to metaphysics ===
a) Nature is a unified whole.

b) Nature is in perpetual motion.

c) Natural quantitative change leads to qualitative change.

d) Natural phenomena possess internal contradictions as part of their struggle, leading to revolutionary rather than reformist change. He relates this to capitalism by stating that "the transition from capitalism to socialism and the liberation of the working class from the yoke of capitalism cannot be effected by slow changes, by reforms, but only by a qualitative change of the capitalist system, by revolution".

=== Part II: outline of the Marxist philosophical materialism in contrast to idealism ===
a) The world is materialistic in nature.

b) Being is objective reality because it is material, thus thinking is a reflection of matter, contributing ideas back to being.

c) The world and its laws are knowable as they can be examined by practice, challenging Kant's idea of "things in themselves." Because of this, Stalin argues that there are laws of social development and that socialism is a science.

=== Part III: Historical materialism ===
a) In this section he asks, what is the "Chief Determinant Force" in society? It is the mode of production of material goods, not the geographical environment or the growth of the population. As he states, "this force, historical materialism holds, is the method of procuring the means of life necessary for human existence, the mode of production of material values – food, clothing, footwear, houses, fuel, instruments of production, etc. – which are indispensable for the life and development of society." He also names two aspects of production, which are the instruments of production and "the relation of men to each other in the process of production, men's relations of production."

b) The first feature of production: "it never stays at one point for a long time and is always in a state of change and development, and that, furthermore, changes in the mode of production inevitably call forth changes in the whole social system, social ideas, political views and political institutions – they call forth a reconstruction of the whole social and political order." Thus, the party of the proletariat must study the laws of the development of production so that it can "proceed primarily from the laws of development of production from the laws of economic development of society."

c) In the second feature of production, Stalin states that "its changes and development always begin with changes and development of the productive forces, and in the first place, with changes and development of the instruments of production" and lays out the stages of history, which are primitive communism, slavery, feudalism, capitalism, and socialism. Additionally, the capitalist relations of production no longer correspond to the state of productive forces of society, creating irreconcilable contradictions.

d) The third feature of production: "the rise of new productive forces and of the relations of production corresponding to them does not take place separately from the old system, after the disappearance of the old system, but within the old system; it takes place not as a result of the deliberate and conscious activity of man, but spontaneously, unconsciously, independently of the will of man." However, this spontaneous process of development does not mean that the change from old relations to new relations will occur smoothly. Rather, Stalin contends, it will result in revolution.

== Reaction and criticism ==
After it was published, it was praised in the Soviet Union for raising dialectical materialism to "new and higher levels" and considered "one of the pinnacles of Marxist-Leninist thought." It was also praised for its clarity and accessibility, and was referred to as "the first accurate and doctrinally reliable work in this field." Stalin's reputation also grew, as he was viewed as a leader and a philosopher. However, he was more so praised for the fact that he wrote anything at all on dialectical and historical materialism, since prior to this work there was not a complete account on these philosophical concepts.

While some believe that Stalin did not add any original thought to the concepts of dialectical or historical materialism, Donoso had argued that Stalin contributed some innovation, departing significantly from original Marxist views. These three instances are his "greater emphasis he places on the 'retroactive' influence of the superstructure," thus emphasizing the importance of the party, his "elaboration of the developmental laws in a socialistic classless society," and the "great stress he placed on the 'national' factor." However, E. Van Ree disputes this, claiming that they were copied or influenced by Georgi Plekhanov. It has also been noted that Stalin did not include a previous law of dialectical materialism, the "negation of the negation" and that he reformulated the law of qualitative to quantitative change.

The sixth volume of the History of Philosophy by Mikhail Alexandrovich Dynnik rejected the work for containing 'grave defects' that presented an oversimplified understanding of dialectical and historical materialism. It further described the characterization of the work as a "master work of marxist philosophy" to be an error.

According to Marxist philosopher Helena Sheehan, the book was presented as clear and concise for the masses but had a "highly stultifying effect on philosophical creativity". She elaborated that the philosophical legacy of Stalin is almost universally rated negatively with most Soviet sources considering his influence to have negatively impacted the creative development of Soviet philosophy. Sheehan discussed omissions in his views on dialectics and noted that most Soviet philosophers rejected his characterization of Hegel's philosophy.

== See also ==
- Ideology of the Communist Party of the Soviet Union
- Ai Siqi's Dialectical Materialism and Historical Materialism
