= Alexander Spirkin =

- Born: 24 December 1918; Saratov Governorate, Russian SFSR
- Died: June 28, 2004 (aged 85); Moscow, Russia
- Era: Contemporary philosophy
- Region: Soviet philosophy
- School: Marxism
- Main interests: Dialectical materialism, Psychology, Philosophical problems of cybernetics

Alexander Georgyevich Spirkin (Russian: Алекса́ндр Гео́ргиевич Спи́ркин; 24 December 1918– 28 June 2004) was a Soviet and Russian philosopher and psychologist. He was born in Saratov Governorate and graduated from the Moscow State Pedagogical University. In 1959 he received his doctorate in philosophy for a dissertation on the origin of consciousness.

He became a professor in 1970, and a year later was elected vice-president of the USSR Philosophical Society. On November 26, 1974, Alexander Spirkin became a Corresponding Member of the USSR Academy of Sciences.

His principal works deal with the problems of consciousness and self-consciousness, worldview, and the subject matter, structure and functions of philosophy. Prof. Spirkin's Fundamentals of Philosophy (1988; English translation 1990) expounding Marxist–Leninist philosophy in popular form was awarded a prize at a competition of textbooks for students of higher educational establishments.

== Works (in English) ==
- Alexander Spirkin; R. Daglish (Translator) (1984), Dialectical Materialism., London: Central Books Ltd, ISBN 0-7147-2010-0, archived from the original on 7 January 2011
- Alexander Spirkin; Sergei Syrovatkin (translator) (1990), Fundamentals of Philosophy. (PDF), Moscow: Progress Publishers, ISBN 5-01-002582-5, archived from the original (PDF) on 2012-03-06First published in 1988, as “Основы философии”

== See also ==
- Philosophy in the Soviet Union
- Dialectical materialism
- Historical materialism
