= Socialism: Utopian and Scientific =

1880 book by Friedrich Engels

Title page of the first English-language edition, published in London by Swan Sonnenschein & Co. in 1892

Socialism: Utopian and Scientific is a short book first published in 1880 by German-born socialist Friedrich Engels. The work was primarily extracted from a longer polemic work published in 1878, Anti-Dühring. It first appeared in French.

The title Socialism: Utopian and Scientific was adopted for the first English edition — the tenth language in which the book appeared. Intended as a popularization of Marxist ideas for a working class readership, the book was one of the fundamental publications of the international socialist movement during the late 19th and early 20th centuries, selling tens of thousands of copies.

== Background ==
Throughout the decade of the 1860s, Karl Marx, close personal friend and political associate of Friedrich Engels, dedicated himself to the study of economics, culminating in the publication of the first volume of Das Kapital in 1867. Marx's lengthy and ponderous volume was extremely difficult for the average reader to penetrate, however, leading Engels to suggest to Marx in a letter of September 16, 1868 that a short popularized version of Das Kapital for a working class audience was urgently needed.

"If it is not written, some Moses or other will come along and do it and botch it up," Engels warned.

Marx concurred with Engels' assessment, suggesting "it would be a very good thing if you yourself wrote a small popular explanatory pamphlet." Engels went on to prepare a short summary of the central points of Das Kapital, but the pamphlet was never published. Nevertheless, the necessity for popularization of Marx's frequently turgid prose remained — a need finally addressed by Engels with the publication of the short work Socialism: Utopian and Scientific more than a decade later.

== Publication history ==
One of a handful of surviving copies of the 1900 second Socialist Labor Party edition of Development of Socialism from Utopia to Science

Rather than a wholly new work, Socialism: Utopian and Scientific was an extract from a larger polemic work written in 1876, Herrn Eugen Dühring's Umwälzung der Wissenschaft (Herr Eugen Dühring's Revolution in Science), commonly known as Anti-Dühring. Three chapters were selected and arranged by Engels and translated into French by Paul Lafargue.

The resulting pamphlet was ultimately published in Paris in 1880 as Socialisme utopique et Socialisme scientifique (Utopian Socialism and Scientific Socialism). This French translation provided the source of multiple other language versions, including the English, Polish and Spanish editions.

The pamphlet was finally published in the original German in 1883. The German edition provided the source for additional translations in Italian, Russian, Danish, Dutch, and Romanian. The tardy release of an English edition in 1892 by Swan Sonnenschein & Co. thus marked the 10th language into which the book had been translated.

"I am not aware that any other Socialist work, not even our Communist Manifesto of 1848 or Marx's Capital, has been so often translated," Engels proudly noted at the time of the English edition's 1892 release.

The first American edition of the work was published by the Socialist Labor Party of America (SLP) in 1895 as part of its "People's Library," featuring a new translation by Daniel DeLeon. A new title was employed by DeLeon, Development of Socialism from Utopia to Science. The SLP edition was first reissued in February 1900 and reissued again at various subsequent dates.

The first American edition of the authorized translation by Edward Aveling was published in 1900 by Charles H. Kerr & Co. According to Kerr his firm sold "not less than 30,000" copies of the book between its first release and a new reissue in June 1908.

In his biography of Marx, Isaiah Berlin described it as “the best brief autobiographical appreciation of Marxism by one of its creators” and considered that, “written in Engels's best vein”, it “had a decisive influence on both Russian and German Socialism.”

== Summary ==
Socialism: Utopian and Scientific explains the differences between utopian socialism and scientific socialism. Utopian socialism is represented by predecessors to Marxist thought such as Fourier. Marxism, through Engels' book, offers the latter term: scientific socialism. Engels argues that utopian socialism finds utopia "in men's brains," "in men's better insights into eternal truth and justice." Rather, Engels claims, "the final causes of all social changes and political revolutions are to be sought in changes in the modes of production and exchange," that is, "not in the philosophy, but in the economics of each particular epoch." In this way, Engels focuses on the materialist conception of history, which is based on an analysis of history and material conditions. This is a classic Marxist idea as found in the 11th of Marx's Theses on Feuerbach: "the philosophers have only interpreted the world, in various ways; the point is to change it." Thus, by way of comparison, Engels' goal is to explain utopian socialism as mere interpretation where scientific socialism seeks to change the world through economics.

Engels begins the book by chronicling the thought of utopian socialists starting with Henri de Saint-Simon, then Charles Fourier, and Robert Owen. In the second chapter, Dialectics, he references the dialectic method to chronicle history of this method from the ancient Greeks to Georg Wilhelm Friedrich Hegel. The final chapter focuses on the aforementioned historical materialism. Engels engages with Marx's ideas in Capital: "in the fourth section of Capital, Marx has explained in detail how since the 15th century this has been historically worked out through the three phases of simple co-operation, manufacture, and modern industry." Throughout the chapter he expounds upon Marx's ideas before ending on a summary of the "historic evolution" of society and the three phases Marx proposes (namely, Medieval Society, Capitalist Revolution, and Proletarian Revolution."

== Proposed sequel ==
Socialism: Utopian and Scientific was one of the best selling and most widely-read socialist publications of the period 1880 to 1910. Plans were subsequently made to adapt another section of Anti-Dühring for a popular audience, and three chapters from Part 2, each entitled "The Theory of Force," were selected for this new publication. In addition, Engels wished to write a new fourth chapter, demonstrating for the German reader "the very considerable role played by force in the history of his own country."

Engels began this chapter dealing with the history of Germany between the revolution of 1848 and the ascension to the office of Chancellor by Otto von Bismarck in 1871, with particular reference to Bismarck's policy of "blood and iron." However, time constraints related to Engels' editing of the later volumes of Das Kapital caused him to lay the manuscript — and the project — aside.

This material from the proposed short book, Die Rolle der Gewalt in der Geschichte (The Role of Force in History), finally saw print in English translation in 1968.

== Sources ==
- Marx and Engels: Basic writings on Politics and Philosophy
