= Menshevizing idealism =

Menshevizing idealism, also known as menshevistic idealism (Russian: меньшевиствующий идеализм), is a term that was widely used in Soviet Marxist literature as a derogatory reference to philosophical views by Abram Deborin’s group with respect to dialectical materialism. The term was coined by Joseph Stalin in 1930. According to Soviet philosophers, Menshevistic idealism tried to identify Marxist dialectics with Hegel’s, divorced theory from practice, and underestimated the Leninist stage in the development of philosophy.

== See also ==
- Mensheviks
