= Dialectical Materialism and Historical Materialism =

Standard textbook on Marxist philosophy in China

- Author: Ai Siqi
- Original title: 辩证唯物主义 历史唯物主义 biànzhèng wéiwù zhǔyì lìshǐ wéiwù zhǔyì
- Language: Chinese
- Publication date: 1961

Dialectical Materialism and Historical Materialism is a Chinese textbook of Marxist–Leninist and Maoist philosophy, written and edited by Ai Siqi in 1961. It was the standard textbook on Marxist philosophy in China until 1978.

== History ==
China had previously relied on Soviet textbooks and this book was written in the context of the Sino-Soviet split, with Kang Sheng and Chen Boda commissioning it in 1959. In 1961, Ai Siqi was appointed to edit the textbook "Dialectical Materialism [and] Historical Materialism". The book was considered the main summation of Mao Zedong's philosophical thoughts, and paid close attention to the connection between Marxist philosophy and traditional Chinese philosophy.

The book became a philosophical textbook for colleges and universities, party schools, and day schools in China, and it had an important influence in the 1960s and 1980s. In 1993 Kang Liu wrote "The first thing any college student encounters in philosophy class is Ai Siqi's systematization of this philosophical cosmology. Ai Siqi expounds upon dialectical materialism and historical materialism."
