= History of the Communist Party of the Soviet Union (Bolsheviks) =

1938 book commissioned by Joseph Stalin

History of the Communist Party of the Soviet Union (Bolsheviks): Short Course
- Title page of the 1939 English edition of the Short Course.
- Author: "A commission of the Central Committee of the CPSU(b)"
- Original title: История Всесоюзной коммунистической партии (большевиков). Краткий курс
- Language: Russian
- Genre: History
- Publisher: OGIZ Gosizdat (first edition)
- Publication date: 1 October 1938
- Publication place: USSR
- Media type: Print
- Pages: 350 (first edition)

The History of the All-Union Communist Party (Bolsheviks): Short Course (Russian: История Всесоюзной коммунистической партии (большевиков). Краткий курс), translated to English under the title History of the Communist Party of the Soviet Union (Bolsheviks): Short Course, is a textbook on the history of the All-Union Communist Party (Bolsheviks) (AUCP (B)) (Russian: Всесоюзная коммунистическая партия (большевиков) — ВКП(б), romanized: Vsesoyuznaya kommunisticheskaya partiya (bol'shevikov) - VKP(b)), first published in 1938. Colloquially known as the Short Course (Russian: Краткий курс), it became the most widely disseminated book during the time (until 1952) that Joseph Stalin served as the General Secretary of the Central Committee of the AUCP (B) and one of the most important works elucidating Marxism–Leninism.

== Background ==
Within the one-party state that was the Soviet Union, the history of the governing Communist Party was long viewed as a critical part of the ideological training process. Aside from the historical efforts of political actors themselves, such as Lenin's longtime associate Grigory Zinoviev, who published a party history in 1924, a long series of professional historians dedicated themselves to writing and publishing "party history" of more or less official status.

These early efforts by Communist Party-affiliated historians included works by V.I. Nevsky (Outlines of the History of the Russian Communist Party; 1923 and History of the RKP(b), Short Outline; 1925); A.S. Bubnov (Fundamental problems of the History of the RKP; 1924); N.N. Popov (Outlines of the History of the All-Union Communist Party; 1925); P.M. Kerzhentsev (Pages of the History of the RKP(b); 1925); Yemelian Yaroslavsky (Short Outlines of the History of the VKP(b); 1926) and a collective work edited by Yaroslavsky (History of the All-Union Communist Party; four volumes, 1926–1930); D.I. Kardashev (Fundamental Historic Stages and Development of the VKP; 1927); P.N. Lepeshinsky (History of the VKP(b) in Congresses; 1927); and V. Knorin (Short History of the VKP(b); 1934), among other projects.

== Overview ==
The book was commissioned by Stalin in 1935. Regarding the motives for compiling it, Robert Service quoted a Bolshevik official who said there was a need for a book which "instead of the Bible" would "give a rigorous answer [...] [t]o the many important questions". At the time, the party was concerned with the abundance of publications about the AUCP (B)'s history and sought to have a single, simple and authoritative book on the subject. The book was written by a team of historians and party members, with the principal authors being Vilhelm Knorin, Pyotr Pospelov and Yemelyan Yaroslavsky. Stalin wrote the chapter about dialectical materialism.

In 1937, a draft of the Short Course was submitted to Stalin, who in turn requested several revisions to the text, including more historical background. On 16 April, the Politburo decreed that Knoriņ, Pospelov and Yaroslavsky would be relieved from all their other party obligations for a period of four months in order to complete the Short Course.

Between 8 September and 17 September 1938, Pospelov, Yaroslavsky, Vyacheslav Molotov and Andrei Zhdanov (Knorin was arrested in the Great Purge and executed on 29 July 1938) met daily with Stalin in his office at the Kremlin to make the last edits to the manuscript. The first chapter appeared in Pravda on 9 September 1938 and the rest of the text was published in serial form, the last chapter on 19 September. On that day, the Politburo decided to have a first edition of six million copies, to be sold at a particularly low price—three rubles a copy, equivalent to the price of a liter and half of milk at the time. On 1 October, the book was released.

On 14 November, the Central Committee issued a resolution On Conduct of Party Propaganda in Connection with the Publication of the Short Course, stating it "ends all arbitrariness and confusion in the presentation of Party history" and turning the book into mandatory reading in the curriculum of all university students and attendants of party schools. The Comintern described the text as the "Encyclopedia of Marxism-Leninism".

Generally speaking, the book characterized Lenin and Stalin as the ideologically correct Bolsheviks and that Party history was a struggle between this "correct" line and various "mistaken" lines.

Until Stalin's death in March 1953, the Short Course was reprinted 301 times and had 42,816,000 copies issued in Russian alone. In addition, it was translated to 66 other languages. In Hungary, 530,000 copies were printed between 1948 and 1950. In Czechoslovakia, over 652,000 copies were printed from 1950 to 1954. It was the most widely disseminated work in Stalin's time and no communist publication broke its record until Quotations from Chairman Mao.

In 1956, Nikita Khrushchev formally repudiated the Short Course in his "On the Cult of Personality and Its Consequences" speech. A new authoritative history of the party written by a team headed by Boris Ponomarev was published in 1960 under the name The History of the Communist Party of the Soviet Union. This publication was subsequently revised and republished in 1964.

== Criticism ==
In the Short Course, veteran Bolshevik leaders like Nikolai Bukharin, Lev Kamenev, Alexei Rykov, Leon Trotsky and Grigory Zinoviev, who conflicted with Stalin and were killed in the late 1930s were depicted as double-dealers who from the very beginning "opposed Lenin and the Bolshevik party".

Polish political philosopher Leszek Kołakowski described the "Short Course" as "perfect manual of false history and doublethink":

"Its lies and suppressions were too obvious to be overlooked by readers who had witnessed the events in question: all but the youngest party members knew who Trotsky was and how collectivization had taken place in Russia, but, obliged as they were to parrot the official version, they became co-authors of the new past and believers in it as party-inspired truth. If anyone challenged this truth on the basis of manifest experience, the indignation of the faithful was perfectly sincere. In this way Stalinism really produced the ‘new Soviet man’: an ideological schizophrenic, a liar who believed what he was saying, a man capable of incessant, voluntary acts of intellectual self-mutilation."

== New official histories under Khrushchev ==
=== Version of 1959/60 ===
Cover of the 1960 History of the Communist Party of the Soviet Union, which supplanted the Short Course of 1938–1952.

A boom in the publication of history textbooks and monographs followed the 20th Congress of the Communist Party in 1956, with debates among professional historians soon followed by the release of publications which sometimes extended beyond the previous limits of discourse. A new history of the CPSU had been called for by the 20th Congress which emerged as a thick collective work in June 1959, History of the Communist Party of the Soviet Union. An English translation of this book appeared the following year.

In the 1959/60 revision of the official party history, the laundry list of inner-party bogeys was replaced by an understated acknowledgement that "many honest Communists and non-Party people" had been subjected to "repressions." Still contending that "Trotskyists, Zinovievites, Right-wingers, and nationalists...deceived the Party in the course of their struggle against it...and were often in league with counter-revolutionary elements," the new history pinned the blame for the brutal events of 1937–38 on "the political adventurer and scoundrel, Beria," as well as the "dispicable role" played by Yezhov," which had caused "many honest people" to be "exterminated." No systemic flaw in the process of investigation, interrogation, or legal dispensation is noted; rather, all bad deeds are personalized to the actions of a small handful of bad actors.

As historian Nancy Whittier Heer observed, "the most dramatic aspect of revision is that of the historical Stalin," who was "transformed from the demigod of the Short Course into a figure of insignificance during 1917" and who had mishandled the strategic situation at the start of World War II. Heer also perceived a softening in the view towards Leon Trotsky, the "New Opposition" of Zinoviev and Kamenev, and the "Right Opposition" of Bukharin, Rykov, and trade union chief Mikhail Tomsky, focusing criticism upon them in terms of "political opposition rather than anti-Soviet treachery and sabotage."

=== Version of 1962/64 ===
The Anti-Stalin campaign took another major step forward in the fall of 1961, with the convocation of the 22nd Congress of the Communist Party. Another reworking of the official history was called for, with Pravda announcing on November 10 that a new version would be forthcoming, in which the question of the Stalin cult of personality would be "more extensively covered." This new edition appeared in Russian in 1962, with an English translation completed in 1964.

The 1962/64 version of the official party history directly criticized the Stalinist Short Course for having had "serious shortcomings," such as "being pervaded by the spirit of the Stalin personality cult" and failing to "elucidate many questions of Party history faithfully and objectively."

Responsibility for the Terror is laid more direcly at Stalin's feet, also placing responsibility for gross violations of Party rules and Soviet law on the activity of Viacheslav Molotov, Lazar Kaganovich, and Georgy Malenkov. Stalin is directly blamed for installing Yezhov and Beria and starting the avalanche of "repressive measures" which came to swallow up "perfectly innocent people," thereby "causing serious damage to the Communist Party and to socialist construction."

These changes were a pale reflection of an ongoing struggle within the historical profession in the USSR, in which an upstart group of historians identified as the "New Direction" (novoe napravlenie) sought to revise centrally-directed historical orthodoxy, breaking with ideological paradigms epitomized by the 1938 Short Course. This battle between anti-Stalinists and neo-Stalinists, which had begun in 1956 in the aftermath of de-Stalinization and the process of rehabilitation of those wrongfully executed, imprisoned, or exiled during the Terror, turned with the October 1964 removal of Nikita Khrushchev as General Secretary of the CPSU and his replacement as top leader of the USSR by a troika headed by Leonid Brezhnev.

== Official history under Brezhnev ==
Following the emergence and consolidation of power by Brezhnev, a new neo-Stalinist orthodoxy came to dominate Soviet history-writing by the end of the decade of the 1960s. In 1970 a new Short History of the Communist Party of the Soviet Union was published, again headed by a team of historians headed by the venerable and adaptable Boris Ponomarev. The problem of Stalin, his inner circle, and secret police chiefs Yezhov and Beria and the repression they wrought was dodged through omission, with one paragraph glorifying the 1936 constitution and 1937 legislative election followed by a paragraph glorifying the 18th Congress of the CPSU in March 1939, with nary a discouraging word about General Secretaries, secret police chiefs, or violent repressions of friends and enemies allowed to impinge upon a triumphalist narrative.

This veneration of the past through omission of negative aspects would remain policy until the rise of Mikhail Gorbachev in 1985 and his subsequent campaigns for "restructuring" (perestroika), "openness" (glasnost), and "democratization" (demokratizatsiia), which entailed a serious and fundamental reexamination of the myriad of "blank spots" of Soviet history.

== Influence in China ==
The text was translated into Chinese in 1942. It was influential in Mao Zedong's thinking. Assessing the text's description of economic planning, in 1942 Mao stated, "We must go in the same spirit."

Although the Short Course was eventually rejected by the Soviet leadership during the Khrushchev Thaw, its formulations, continued to be of fundamental importance in China, where Mao repeatedly attacked his opponents in the Chinese Communist Party as "capitalist roaders" and agents of bourgeois, counter-revolutionary and Kuomintang conspiracies. Mao felt that the Short Course best combined the teachings of Karl Marx and Vladimir Lenin as well as being a blue print to applying communist ideals in the real world. China was continuing to grow into a Marxist–Leninist state with the founding of the People's Republic of China in 1949.
