= Central Committee of the 25th Congress of the Communist Party of the Soviet Union =

The Central Committee of the 25th Congress of the Communist Party of the Soviet Union was in session from 1976 until 1981. It elected, at its 1st Plenary Session, the 25th Politburo, the 25th Secretariat and the 25th Party Control Committee of the Communist Party of the Soviet Union.

== Plenums ==
The Central Committee was not a permanent institution. It convened plenary sessions. 12 CC plenary sessions were held between the 25th Congress and the 26th Congress. When the CC was not in session, decision-making power was vested in the internal bodies of the CC itself; that is, the Politburo and the Secretariat. None of these bodies were permanent either; typically they convened several times a month.

Plenary sessions of the Central Committee
Plenum	Date	Length
1st Plenary Session	3 March 1976	1 day
2nd Plenary Session	25–26 October 1976	2 days
3rd Plenary Session	24 May 1977	1 day
4th Plenary Session	3 October 1977	1 day
5th Plenary Session	13 December 1977	1 day
6th Plenary Session	3–4 July 1978	2 days
7th Plenary Session	27 November 1978	1 day
8th Plenary Session	17 April 1979	1 day
9th Plenary Session	27 November 1979	1 day
10th Plenary Session	23 June 1980	1 day
11th Plenary Session	21 October 1980	1 day
12th Plenary Session	20 February 1981	1 day

== Composition ==
=== Members ===
Members of the Central Committee of the 25th Congress of the Communist Party of the Soviet Union
Name	Cyrillic	24th CC	26th CC	Birth	Death	PM	Ethnicity	Gender
Pyotr Abrasimov	Петр Абрасимов	Old	Reelected	1912	2009	1940	Russian	Male
Sergey Afanasyev	Серге́й Афана́сьев	Old	Reelected	1918	2001	1943	Russian	Male
Viktor Afanasyev	Ви́ктор Афана́сьев	New	Reelected	1922	1994	1943	Russian	Male
Aleksandr Aksyonov	Алекса́ндр Аксёнов	New	Reelected	1924	2009	1945	Belarusian	Male
Vasily Akulintsev	Василий Акулинцев	Old	Not	1916	1993	1944	Russian	Male
Evgeny Alekseevsky	Евгений Алексеевский	Old	Died	1906	1979	1925	Ukrainian	Male
Pyotr Alekseyev	Пётр Алексеев	Candidate	Reelected	1913	1999	1940	Russian	Male
Anatoly Alexandrov	Анатолий Александров	Old	Reelected	1903	1994	1962	Ukrainian	Male
Heydar Aliyev	Гейда́р Али́ев	Old	Reelected	1923	2003	1945	Azerbaijani	Male
Alexander Altunin	Алекса́ндр Алту́нин	New	Reelected	1921	1989	1943	Russian	Male
Yuri Andropov	Юрий Андропов	Old	Reelected	1914	1984	1939	Russian	Male
Aleksey Antonov	Алексей Антонов	Old	Reelected	1912	2010	1940	Russian	Male
Sergey Antonov	Серге́й Анто́нов	New	Reelected	1911	1987	1937	Russian	Male
Boris Aristov	Борис Аристов	Old	Reelected	1925	2018	1945	Russian	Male
Ivan Arkhipov	Иван Архипов	New	Reelected	1907	1998	1928	Russian	Male
Bayken Ashimov	Асанбай Аскаров	Old	Reelected	1917	2010	1944	Kazakh	Male
Asanbay Askarov	Байкен Ашимов	Old	Reelected	1922	2001	1940	Kazakh	Male
Erkin Auelbekov	Еркин Ауельбеков	Candidate	Reelected	1930	1999	1940	Kazakh	Male
Stepan Avramenko	Степан Авраменко	Old	Reelected	1918	2010	1950	Ukrainian	Male
Ivan Bagramyan	Иван Баграмян	Old	Reelected	1897	1982	1941	Armenian	Male
Nikolai Baibakov	Николай Байбаков	Old	Reelected	1911	2008	1939	Russian	Male
Vyacheslav Bakhirev	Вячеслав Бахирев	Old	Reelected	1916	1991	1951	Russian	Male
Boris Bakin	Борис Бакин	New	Reelected	1913	1992	1941	Russian	Male
Yuri Balandin	Юрий Баландин	New	Reelected	1925	2004	1944	Russian	Male
Nikolai Bannikov	Никола́й Ба́нников	Old	Reelected	1914	2004	1937	Russian	Male
Pavel Batitsky	Па́вел Бати́цкий	Old	Reelected	1910	1984	1938	Ukrainian	Male
Vladimir Bazovsky	Владимир Базовский	Old	Reelected	1917	1993	1942	Russian	Male
Khasan Bekturganov	Хасан Бектурганов	Candidate	Reelected	1922	1987	1942	Kazakh	Male
Konstantin Belyak	Константи́н Беля́к	Promoted	Reelected	1916	1997	1942	Russian	Male
Anatoly Berozin	Анатолий Березин	New	Reelected	1931	1998	1954	Mordvin	Male
Boris Beshchev	Борис Бещев	Old	Reelected	1903	1981	1927	Russian	Male
Ivan Bespalov	Иван Беспалов	Candidate	Reelected	1911	2011	1944	Russian	Male
Aleksandra Biryukova	Александра Бирюкова	Candidate	Reelected	1929	2008	1956	Russian	Female
Aleksandr Bleskov	Александр Блесков	Old	Not	1922	2006	1951	Russian	Male
Ivan Bodiul	Иван Бодюл	Old	Reelected	1918	2013	1940	Ukrainian	Male
Ivan Bondarenko	Иван Бондаренко	Old	Reelected	1926	2009	1950	Ukrainian	Male
Mykola Borysenko	Николай Борисенко	Candidate	Died	1918	1980	1943	Ukrainian	Male
Andrei Borodin	Андрей Бородин	Old	Reelected	1912	1984	1941	Russian	Male
Leonid Borodin	Леонид Бородин	Promoted	Reelected	1923	2008	1948	Russian	Male
Pavel Borodin	Павел Бородин	Old	Reelected	1911	1998	1932	Russian	Male
Oleksandr Botvin	Александр Ботвин	Candidate	Reelected	1918	1998	1943	Ukrainian	Male
Boris Bratchenko	Бори́с Бра́тченко	Old	Reelected	1912	2004	1940	Russian	Male
Konstantin Brekhov	Константи́н Бре́хов	Old	Reelected	1907	1994	1931	Russian	Male
Leonid Brezhnev	Леонид Брежнев	Old	Reelected	1906	1982	1931	Russian	Male
Boris Bugayev	Борис Бугаев	Old	Reelected	1923	2007	1942	Ukrainian	Male
Aleksandr Bulgakov	Александр Булгаков	Old	Reelected	1907	1996	1937	Ukrainian	Male
Boris Butoma	Бутома Евстафьевич	Old	Died	1907	1976	1928	Ukrainian	Male
Konstantin Chernenko	Константин Черненко	Old	Reelected	1911	1985	1931	Ukrainian	Male
Stepan Chervonenko	Степан Червоненко	Old	Reelected	1915	2003	1940	Ukrainian	Male
Gavrii Chiryayev	Гавриил Чиряев	Old	Reelected	1925	1985	1944	Yakut	Male
Aleksey Chornyy	Алексей Чёрный	Old	Reelected	1921	2002	1931	Ukrainian	Male
Vasily Chuikov	Васи́лий Чуйко́в	Old	Reelected	1900	1982	1919	Russian	Male
Aleksey Chuyev	Алексе́й Чу́ев	New	Died	1918	1976	1948	Russian	Male
Pyotr Dementev	Pyotr Dementev	Old	Died	1907	1977	1938	Russian	Male
Raisa Dementyeva	Раиса Дементьева	Candidate	Reelected	1925	2022	1948	Russian	Female
Pyotr Demichev	Пётр Де́мичев	Old	Reelected	1917	2010	1939	Russian	Male
Vasily Demidenko	Василий Демиденко	Promoted	Reelected	1930	1998	1955	Ukrainian	Male
Karen Demirchyan	Каре́н Демирчя́н	New	Reelected	1932	1999	1955	Armenian	Male
Viktor Dobrik	Виктор До́брик	Old	Reelected	1927	2008	1954	Ukrainian	Male
Anatoly Dobrynin	Анато́лий Добры́нин	Old	Reelected	1919	2010	1945	Russian	Male
Vladimir Dolgikh	Владимир Долгих	Old	Reelected	1924	2020	1942	Russian	Male
Vasiliy Doyenin	Василий Доенин	Candidate	Died	1909	1977	1940	Russian	Male
Vasily Drozdenko	Васи́лий Дрозде́нко	Old	Reelected	1924	1982	1944	Ukrainian	Male
Anatoly Drygin	Анатолий Дрыгин	Old	Reelected	1914	1990	1940	Russian	Male
Veniamin Dymshits	Вениамин Дымшиц	Old	Reelected	1910	1993	1937	Ukrainian	Male
Pavel Fedirko	Па́вел Феди́рко	New	Reelected	1932	2019	1957	Russian	Male
Viktor Fedorov	Ви́ктор Фёдоров	Candidate	Reelected	1912	1990	1939	Russian	Male
Pyotr Fedoseyev	Петр Федосеев	Old	Reelected	1908	1990	1939	Russian	Male
Leonid Florentyev	Леонид Флорентьев	Old	Reelected	1911	2003	1939	Russian	Male
Alexandra Fominykh	Александра Фоминых	Promoted	Not	1925	2004	1961	Russian	Female
Konstantin Galanshin	Константин Галаншин	Old	Not	1912	2011	1944	Russian	Male
Dmitry Galkin	Дми́трий Га́лкин	New	Not	1926	2014	1949	Russian	Male
Muhammetnazar Gapurov	Мухамедназар Гапуров	Old	Reelected	1912	2004	1944	Turkmen	Male
Vasily Garbuzov	Василий Гарбузов	Old	Reelected	1911	1985	1939	Russian	Male
Alexander Georgiev	Александр Георгиев	Old	Died	1913	1976	1943	Ukrainian	Male
Valentin Glushko	Валенти́н Глушко́	New	Reelected	1908	1989	1956	Ukrainian	Male
Nikolai Goldin	Николай Голдин	Old	Reelected	1910	2001	1929	Russian	Male
Boris Goncharenko	Николай Голдин	New	Reelected	1927	1997	1948	Ukrainian	Male
Grigory Gorban	Григорий Горбань	Old	Reelected	1932	2000	1959	Ukrainian	Male
Mikhail Gorbachev	Михаил Горбачёв	Old	Reelected	1931	2022	1952	Russian	Male
Leonid Gorshkov	Леонид Горшков	Old	Reelected	1930	1994	1952	Russian	Male
Sergey Gorshkov	Серге́й Горшков	Old	Reelected	1910	1988	1942	Russian	Male
Fodor Goryachev	Фёдор Горячев	Old	Not	1905	1996	1927	Russian	Male
Andrei Grechko	Андре́й Гре́чко	Old	Died	1903	1976	1928	Ukrainian	Male
Leonid Grekov	Леонид Греков	Old	Not	1928	2004	1949	Russian	Male
Viktor Grishin	Ви́ктор Гри́шин	Old	Reelected	1914	1992	1939	Russian	Male
Petras Griškevičius	Пя́трас Гришкя́вичюс	New	Reelected	1924	1987	1945	Lithuanian	Male
Ivan Grishmanov	Иван Гришманов	Old	Died	1906	1979	1936	Russian	Male
Andrei Gromyko	Андрей Громыко	Old	Reelected	1909	1989	1931	Belarusian	Male
Pyotr Grushin	Пётр Гру́шин	Old	Reelected	1906	1993	1931	Russian	Male
Aleksandr Gudkov	Александр Гудков	Candidate	Reelected	1930	1992	1958	Russian	Male
Timofey Guzhenko	Тимофей Гуженко	Old	Reelected	1918	2008	1941	Russian	Male
Ivan Hrushetsky	Иван Грушецкий	Old	Not	1904	1982	1928	Ukrainian	Male
Maria Ivannikova	Раиса Бельских	Old	Not	1923	2006	1948	Russian	Female
Yevgeny Ivanovsky	Евге́ний Ивано́вский	Old	Reelected	1918	1991	1941	Belarusian	Male
Vadim Ignatov	Вадим Игнатов	New	Reelected	1931	1998	1953	Russian	Male
Johannes Käbin	Йоха́ннес Кэ́бин	Old	Reelected	1905	1999	1927	Estonian	Male
Boris Kachura	Борис Качура	New	Reelected	1930	2007	1957	Ukrainian	Male
Andrey Kandrenkov	Андре́й Кандрёнков	Candidate	Reelected	1915	1989	1939	Russian	Male
Ivan Kapitonov	Иван Капитонов	Old	Reelected	1915	2002	1939	Russian	Male
Georgy Karavayev	Георгий Караваев	Candidate	Reelected	1913	1994	1940	Russian	Male
Vladimir Karlov	Влади́мир Ка́рлов	Promoted	Reelected	1914	1994	1940	Russian	Male
Yevdokya Karpova	Марина Журавлёва	Candidate	Reelected	1923	2000	1952	Russian	Female
Konstantin Katushev	Константин Катушев	Old	Reelected	1927	2010	1952	Russian	Male
Vasily Kavun	Василий Кавун	Old	Reelected	1928	2009	1954	Ukrainian	Male
Vasily Kazakov	Евге́ний Ивано́вский	Old	Candidate	1927	2008	1947	Russian	Male
Ivan Kazanets	Иван Казанец	Old	Reelected	1918	2013	1944	Ukrainian	Male
Mstislav Keldysh	Мстислав Келдыш	Old	Died	1911	1978	1949	Russian	Male
Nikolai Kirichenko	Николай Кириченко	Promoted	Reelected	1923	1986	1944	Ukrainian	Male
Andrei Kirilenko	Андре́й Кириле́нко	Old	Reelected	1906	1990	1930	Ukrainian	Male
Vladimir Kirillin	Владимир Кириллин	Old	Not	1913	1999	1937	Russian	Male
Ivan Kiselov	Иван Киселёв	Old	Reelected	1917	2004	1944	Russian	Male
Tikhon Kiselyov	Ти́хон Киселёв	Old	Reelected	1917	1983	1940	Belarusian	Male
Stepan Khitrov	Степан Хитров	Old	Reelected	1910	1999	1932	Russian	Male
Aleksandr Khramtsov	Александр Храмцов	Old	Not	1921	2004	1962	Russian	Male
Yuri Khristoradnov	Юрий Христораднов	New	Reelected	1929	2018	1951	Russian	Male
Narmakhonmadi Khudayberdyyev	Нармахонмади Худайбердыев	Old	Reelected	1928	2011	1962	Uzbek	Male
Mikhail Klepikov	Михаил Клепиков	Candidate	Reelected	1927	1999	1956	Russian	Male
Ivan Klimenko	Иван Клименко	Candidate	Reelected	1921	2006	1945	Russian	Male
Yevgeny Klimchenko	Климченко Иванович	New	Reelected	1924	1989	1944	Belarusian	Male
Vladimir Klyuyev	Владимир Клюев	New	Reelected	1924	1998	1949	Ukrainian	Male
Filipp Knyazev	Фили́пп Кня́зев	Candidate	Reelected	1916	1994	1940	Russian	Male
Aleksandr Kokarev	Александр Кокарев	Old	Not	1909	1991	1938	Ukrainian	Male
Boris Konoplov	Борис Коноплёв	New	Reelected	1919	2008	1945	Russian	Male
Vasily Konotop	Василий Конотоп	Old	Reelected	1916	1995	1944	Ukrainian	Male
Nikolay Konovalov	Никола́й Конова́лов	Old	Reelected	1907	1993	1929	Russian	Male
Nikolay Korytkov	Николай Корытков	Old	Not	1910	2000	1939	Russian	Male
Leonid Kostandov	Леони́д Коста́ндов	Old	Reelected	1915	1984	1942	Armenian	Male
Anatoly Kostousov	Анатолий Костоусов	Old	Not	1906	1985	1925	Russian	Male
Alexei Kosygin	Алексей Косыгин	Old	Died	1904	1980	1927	Russian	Male
Alexander Kovalenko	Александр Коваленко	Old	Reelected	1909	1987	1931	Ukrainian	Male
Nikolay Kozlov	Николай Козлов	Old	Reelected	1925	2001	1946	Russian	Male
Pavel Kozyr	Па́вел Ко́зырь	Old	Reelected	1913	1999	1939	Ukrainian	Male
Mikhail Krakhmalov	Михаил Крахмалёв	Old	Died	1914	1977	1939	Russian	Male
Nikolay Kruchina	Николай Кручина	Candidate	Reelected	1928	1991	1949	Russian	Male
Zinaida Kruglova	Зинаи́да Кругло́ва	New	Reelected	1923	1995	1944	Russian	Male
Fyodor Kulakov	Фёдор Кулаков	Old	Died	1918	1978	1940	Russian	Male
Leonid Kulichenko	Леонид Куличенко	Old	Reelected	1913	1990	1940	Russian	Male
Viktor Kulikov	Виктор Куликов	Old	Reelected	1921	2013	1942	Russian	Male
Dinmukhamed Kunaev	Дінмұхаммед Қонаев	Old	Reelected	1912	1993	1939	Kazakh	Male
Semyon Kurkotkin	Семё́н Курко́ткин	Candidate	Reelected	1917	1990	1940	Russian	Male
Pavel Kutakhov	Павел Кутахов	Old	Reelected	1914	1984	1942	Russian	Male
Vasily Kuznetsov	Василий Кузнецов	Old	Reelected	1901	1990	1927	Russian	Male
Sergey Lapin	Серге́й Лапин	Old	Reelected	1912	1990	1939	Russian	Male
Voldemar Lein	Вольдемар Леин	Candidate	Reelected	1920	1987	1946	Russian	Male
Pavel Leonov	Павел Леонов	Old	Reelected	1918	1992	1944	Russian	Male
Mikhail Lesechko	Михаил Лесечко	Old	Reelected	1909	1984	1940	Ukrainian	Male
Yegor Ligachyov	Егор Лигачёв	Candidate	Reelected	1920	2021	1944	Russian	Male
Viktor Lomakin	Виктор Ломакин	Old	Reelected	1926	2012	1953	Russian	Male
Pyotr Lomako	Пётр Лома́ко	Old	Reelected	1904	1990	1925	Russian	Male
Vladimir Lomonosov	Владимир Ломоносов	Old	Reelected	1928	1999	1950	Russian	Male
Fodor Loshchenkov	Фодор Лощенков	Candidate	Reelected	1915	2009	1943	Russian	Male
Oleksandr Liashko	Алекса́ндр Ляшко́	Old	Reelected	1915	2002	1942	Ukrainian	Male
Nikolay Lyashchenko	Николай Лященко	Old	Not	1910	2000	1931	Russian	Male
Lidia Lykova	Лидия Лыкова	Candidate	Reelected	1913	2016	1938	Russian	Female
Valentin Makeyev	Валентин Макеев	New	Reelected	1930	1999	1956	Russian	Male
Viktor Makeyev	Ви́ктор Маке́ев	Candidate	Reelected	1924	1985	1942	Russian	Male
Viktor Maltsev	Виктор Мальцев	Candidate	Reelected	1917	2003	1945	Russian	Male
Sergey Manyakin	Сергей Манякин	Old	Reelected	1923	2010	1945	Russian	Male
Valery Marisov	Вале́рий Ма́рисов	Old	Reelected	1915	1992	1940	Russian	Male
Georgy Markov	Гео́ргий Ма́рков	Old	Reelected	1911	1991	1946	Russian	Male
Pyotr Masherov	Пётр Машеров	Old	Died	1918	1980	1943	Belarusian	Male
Nikolay Maslennikov	Николай Масленников	Old	Reelected	1921	2013	1951	Russian	Male
Nazar Matchanov	Назар Матчанов	Old	Not	1923	2010	1949	Uzbek	Male
Vladimir Matskevich	Владимир Мацкевич	Old	Not	1909	1998	1939	Ukrainian	Male
Kirill Mazurov	Кири́лл Ма́зуров	Old	Not	1914	1989	1940	Belarusian	Male
Sergey Medunov	Серге́й Медуно́в	New	Reelected	1915	1999	1942	Russian	Male
Fodor Meshkov	Фёдор Мешков	Candidate	Reelected	1915	1987	1987	Russian	Male
Valentin Mesyats	Валентин Месяц	Old	Reelected	1928	2019	1955	Russian	Male
German Mikhaylov	Герман Михайлов	Old	Not	1929	1999	1964	Ukrainian	Male
Andrey Modogoyev	Андрей Модогоев	Old	Reelected	1915	1989	1940	Buryat	Male
Fedir Morhun	Фёдор Моргу́н	Promoted	Reelected	1924	2008	1952	Ukrainian	Male
Ivan Morozov	Иван Морозов	Candidate	Reelected	1924	1987	1943	Russian	Male
Kirill Moskalenko	Кирилл Москаленко	Old	Reelected	1902	1985	1926	Ukrainian	Male
Mirzamakhmud Musakhanov	Мирзамахмуд Мусаханов	Candidate	Reelected	1912	1995	1943	Uzbek	Male
Pyotr Neporozhny	Пётр Непорожний	Old	Reelected	1910	1999	1940	Ukrainian	Male
Viktor Nikonov	Виктор Никонов	Candidate	Reelected	1929	1993	1954	Russian	Male
Sabir Niyazbekov	Сабир Ниязбеков	Old	Not	1912	1989	1939	Kazakh	Male
Ignaty Novikov	Игнатий Новиков	Old	Reelected	1906	1993	1926	Ukrainian	Male
Vladimir Novikov	Владимир Новиков	Old	Not	1907	2000	1936	Russian	Male
Ziya Nuriyev	Зия Нуриев	Old	Reelected	1915	2012	1939	Bashkir	Male
Nikolai Orgakov	Николай Огарков	Old	Reelected	1917	1994	1945	Russian	Male
Vladimir Orlov	Владимир Орлов	Old	Reelected	1921	1999	1948	Russian	Male
Nikolai Patolichev	Николай Патоличев	Old	Reelected	1908	1989	1928	Russian	Male
Boris Pastukhov	Борис Пастухов	Promoted	Reelected	1933	2021	1959	Russian	Male
Borys Paton	Бори́с Пато́н	Old	Reelected	1918	2020	1952	Ukrainian	Male
Georgy Pavlov	Гео́ргий Па́влов	Old	Reelected	1910	1991	1939	Russian	Male
Grigory Pavlov	Григорий Павлов	Candidate	Reelected	1913	1994	1940	Russian	Male
Vladimir Pavlov	Влади́мир Па́влов	Old	Reelected	1923	1998	1948	Russian	Male
Ivan Pavlovsky	Ива́н Павло́вский	Old	Reelected	1909	1999	1939	Ukrainian	Male
Nikolai Pegov	Георгий Павлов	Old	Reelected	1905	1991	1939	Ukrainian	Male
Arvīds Pelše	А́рвид Пе́льше	Old	Reelected	1899	1983	1915	Latvian	Male
Vasily Petrov	Васи́лий Петро́в	New	Reelected	1917	2014	1944	Russian	Male
Stanislav Pilotovich	Станислав Пилотович	Old	Not	1922	1986	1944	Belarusian	Male
Pyotr Pleshakov	Пётр Плешаков	Promoted	Reelected	1922	1987	1944	Russian	Male
Nikolai Podgorny	Никола́й Подго́рный	Old	Reelected	1903	1983	1930	Ukrainian	Male
Pyotr Pogrebnyak	Пётр Погребняк	New	Died	1928	1980	1954	Ukrainian	Male
Ivan Polyakov	Ива́н Поляко́в	Old	Reelected	1914	2004	1949	Belarusian	Male
Dmitry Polyansky	Дми́трий Поля́нский	Old	Reelected	1917	2001	1939	Ukrainian	Male
Boris Ponomarev	Борис Пономарёв	Old	Reelected	1905	1995	1919	Russian	Male
Mikhail Ponomarev	Михаил Пономарёв	Candidate	Reelected	1918	2001	1939	Russian	Male
Boris Popov	Борис Попов	Candidate	Reelected	1909	1993	1931	Russian	Male
Maria Popova	Мари́я Попо́ва	Old	Reelected	1928	2021	1959	Russian	Female
Nikolay Priyezzhev	Николай Приезжев	Old	Reelected	1919	1989	1946	Russian	Male
Ilya Prokopyev	Николай Приезжев	New	Reelected	1926	2017	1946	Chuvash	Male
Mikhail Prokofyev	Михаил Прокофьев	Old	Reelected	1910	1999	1941	Russian	Male
Vladimir Promyslov	Владимир Промыслов	Old	Reelected	1908	1993	1928	Russian	Male
Vasily Prokhorov	Ильич Василий	Old	Reelected	1906	1989	1928	Russian	Male
Sharof Rashidov	Шараф Рашидов	Old	Reelected	1917	1983	1939	Uzbek	Male
Dzhabar Rasulov	Джабар Расулов	Old	Reelected	1913	1982	1934	Tajik	Male
Nikolai Rodionov	Никола́й Родио́нов	Old	Reelected	1915	1999	1944	Russian	Male
Grigory Romanov	Григорий Романов	Old	Reelected	1923	2008	1944	Russian	Male
Vitālijs Rubenis	Николай Романов	Candidate	Reelected	1914	1994	1939	Latvian	Male
Roman Rudenko	Рома́н Руде́нко	Old	Not	1907	1981	1926	Russian	Male
Konstantin Rudnev	Константин Руднев	Old	Died	1911	1980	1941	Russian	Male
Aleksey Rumyantsev	Алексей Румянцев	Old	Reelected	1905	1993	1940	Russian	Male
Konstantin Rusakov	Константи́н Русако́в	Old	Reelected	1909	1993	1943	Russian	Male
Yakov Ryabov	Я́ков Ря́бов	Old	Reelected	1928	2018	1954	Russian	Male
Vasily Rykov	Василий Рыков	Old	Reelected	1918	2011	1943	Russian	Male
Ivan Sakhnyuk	Иван Сахнюк	New	Reelected	1927	Alive	1960	Ukrainian	Male
Valentin Semonov	Валентин Семенов	New	Reelected	1930	2002	1958	Ukrainian	Male
Ivan Senkin	Иван Сенькин	Old	Reelected	1915	1986	1940	Karelian	Male
Midkhat Shakirov	Мидха́т Шаки́ров	Old	Reelected	1916	2004	1944	Bashkir	Male
Valentin Shashin	Валентин Шашин	Candidate	Died	1916	1977	1940	Belarusian	Male
Nikolai Shchelokov	Никола́й Щёлоков	Old	Reelected	1910	1984	1931	Russian	Male
Boris Shcherbina	Борис Щербина	Candidate	Reelected	1919	1990	1939	Ukrainian	Male
Volodymyr Shcherbitsky	Влади́мир Щерби́цкий	Old	Reelected	1918	1990	1948	Ukrainian	Male
Eduard Shevardnadze	Эдуард Шеварднадзе	New	Reelected	1928	2014	1936	Georgian	Male
Aleksey Shibayev	Алексей Шибаев	Old	Reelected	1915	1991	1940	Russian	Male
Aleksandr Shibalov	Александр Шибалов	Candidate	Not	1913	1987	1945	Russian	Male
Aleksey Shitikov	Алексе́й Ши́тиков	Old	Reelected	1912	1993	1939	Russian	Male
Aleksey Shkolnikov	Алексей Шко́льников	Old	Reelected	1914	2003	1940	Russian	Male
Aleksandr Shokin	Алекса́ндр Шо́кин	Old	Reelected	1909	1988	1936	Russian	Male
Mikhail Sholokhov	Михаил Шолохов	Old	Reelected	1905	1984	1932	Russian	Male
Semon Skachkov	Семён Скачков	New	Reelected	1907	1996	1936	Ukrainian	Male
Anatoly Skochilov	Анатолий Скочилов	New	Died	1912	1977	1940	Russian	Male
Yefim Slavsky	Ефи́м Сла́вский	Old	Reelected	1898	1991	1918	Russian	Male
Leonid Smirnov	Леонид Смирнов	Old	Reelected	1916	2001	1943	Russian	Male
Lev Smirnov	Лев Смирно́в	New	Reelected	1911	1986	1945	Russian	Male
Ivan Sokolov	Серге́й Соколо́в	New	Reelected	1928	1982	1952	Ukrainian	Male
Sergey Sokolov	Серге́й Соколо́в	Old	Reelected	1911	2012	1937	Russian	Male
Tikhon Sokovlev	Ти́хон Соколо́в	Old	Not	1913	1992	1941	Russian	Male
Mikhail Solomentsev	Михаи́л Соло́менцев	New	Reelected	1913	2008	1940	Russian	Male
Yuri Solovyev	Михаи́л Соло́менцев	New	Reelected	1925	2011	1955	Russian	Male
Vladimir Stepakov	Влади́мир Степако́в	Old	Not	1912	1987	1937	Russian	Male
Alexander Struyev	Алекса́ндр Стру́ев	Old	Reelected	1906	1991	1927	Ukrainian	Male
Boris Stukalin	Борис Стукалин	New	Reelected	1923	2004	1943	Russian	Male
Fodor Surganov	Фёдор Сурганов	Old	Died	1911	1976	1940	Belarusian	Male
Mikhail Suslov	Михаил Суслов	Old	Reelected	1902	1982	1921	Russian	Male
Fikryat Tabeyev	Фикрят Табеев	Old	Reelected	1928	2015	1957	Russian	Male
Nikolai Tarasov	Николай Тара́сов	Candidate	Reelected	1911	2010	1942	Russian	Male
Vasily Taratuta	Василий Таратута	Candidate	Reelected	1930	2008	1955	Ukrainian	Male
Valentina Tereshkova	Валентина Терешкова	Old	Reelected	1937	Alive	1960	Russian	Female
Nikolai Tikhonov	Николай Тихонов	Old	Reelected	1905	1997	1940	Russian	Male
Aleksey Titarenko	Алексе́й Титаре́нко	Old	Reelected	1915	1992	1940	Ukrainian	Male
Vitaly Titov	Виталий Титов	Old	Died	1907	1980	1938	Ukrainian	Male
Georgy Titov	Виталий Титов	New	Died	1909	1980	1940	Russian	Male
Alexander Tokarev	Алекса́ндр То́карев	Old	Reelected	1921	2004	1942	Russian	Male
Lev Tolkunov	Лев Толкунов	Candidate	Reelected	1919	1989	1943	Russian	Male
Vasily Tolstikov	Василий Толстиков	Old	Not	1917	2003	1948	Russian	Male
Nikita Tolubeyev	Ники́та Толубе́ев	Old	Reelected	1922	2013	1947	Ukrainian	Male
Vladimir Tolubko	Влади́мир Толу́бко	Candidate	Reelected	1914	1989	1939	Ukrainian	Male
Sergey Trapeznikov	Сергей Трапезников	Old	Reelected	1912	1984	1931	Russian	Male
Georgy Tsukanov	Георгий Цуканов	Old	Reelected	1919	2001	1941	Ukrainian	Male
Vladimir Tsybulko	Владимир Цыбулько	Old	Reelected	1924	1987	1944	Ukrainian	Male
Ivan Tretyak	Иван Третьяк	Old	Reelected	1923	2007	1943	Ukrainian	Male
Mikhail Trunov	Михаил Трунов	Old	Reelected	1931	2010	1955	Russian	Male
Yevgeny Tyazhelnikov	Евге́ний Тяже́льников	Old	Reelected	1928	2020	1951	Russian	Male
Magomed-Salam Umakhanov	Магомед-Салам Умаханов	Old	Reelected	1918	1992	1939	Dargin	Male
Dmitriy Ustinov	Дми́трий Усти́нов	Old	Reelected	1908	1984	1927	Russian	Male
Turdakun Usubaliev	Турдакун Усубалиев	Old	Reelected	1919	2015	1945	Kyrghyz	Male
Vladimir Utkin	Владимир Уткин	New	Reelected	1923	2000	1940	Russian	Male
Artur Vader	Артур Вадер	Old	Died	1920	1978	1943	Estonian	Male
Nikolai Vasilyev	Павел Бородин	Old	Reelected	1916	2011	1942	Russian	Male
Oleksiy Vatchenko	Алексе́й Ва́тченко	Old	Reelected	1914	1984	1940	Ukrainian	Male
Grigory Vashchenko	Григорий Ващенко	Old	Reelected	1920	1990	1943	Ukrainian	Male
Aleksey Viktorov	Алексей Викторов	Old	Reelected	1917	1989	1945	Russian	Male
Mikhail Voropayev	Михаил Воропаев	Old	Reelected	1919	2009	1945	Russian	Male
Vitaly Vorotnikov	Вита́лий Воротнико́в	Old	Reelected	1926	2012	1950	Russian	Male
Augusts Voss	Август Восс	Old	Reelected	1916	1994	1940	Latvian	Male
Mikhail Vsevolozhsky	Михаи́л Все́воложский	Candidate	Reelected	1917	2000	1944	Russian	Male
Ivan Yakubovsky	Ива́н Якубо́вский	Old	Died	1912	1976	1937	Belarusian	Male
Mikhail Yasnov	Михаил Яснов	Old	Reelected	1906	1991	1925	Russian	Male
Anatoly Yegorov	Анато́лий Его́ров	Old	Reelected	1924	1982	1944	Russian	Male
Vyacheslav Yelyutin	Вячеслав Елю́тин	Old	Reelected	1907	1993	1929	Russian	Male
Alexei Yepishev	Алексей Епишев	Old	Reelected	1908	1985	1929	Russian	Male
Lev Yermin	Ле́в Е́рмин	Old	Reelected	1923	2004	1943	Russian	Male
Aleksandr Yezhevsky	Александр Ежевский	Old	Reelected	1915	2017	1945	Russian	Male
Ivan Yunak	Иван Юнак	Old	Reelected	1918	1995	1944	Ukrainian	Male
Leonid Zamyatin	Леонид Замятин	Old	Reelected	1922	2019	1952	Russian	Male
Vladimir Zhigalin	Владимир Жигалин	Old	Reelected	1907	1990	1931	Russian	Male
Mikhail Zimyanin	Михаил Зимянин	Old	Reelected	1914	1995	1939	Belarusian	Male
Grigory Zolotukhin	Григо́рий Золоту́хин	Old	Reelected	1911	1988	1939	Russian	Male
Sergey Zverev	Серге́й Зве́рев	Old	Died	1912	1978	1932	Russian	Male

=== Candidates ===
Candidate Members of the Central Committee of the 25th Congress of the Communist Party of the Soviet Union
Name	Cyrillic	24th CC	26th CC	Birth	Death	PM	Ethnicity	Gender
Andrey Aleksandrov-Agentov	Андре́й Алекса́ндров-Аге́нтов	New	Member	1918	1993	1948	Russian	Male
Pavel Anisimov	Павел Анисимов	New	Candidate	1928	2001	1952	Russian	Male
Nikolai Antonov	Никола́й Анто́нов	New	Candidate	1921	1996	1944	Russian	Male
Georgy Arbatov	Гео́ргий Арба́тов	New	Member	1923	2010	1943	Russian	Male
Nikolai Belukha	Николай Белуха	Candidate	Not	1920	1981	1948	Ukrainian	Male
Konstantin Belyak	Константи́н Беля́к	New	Promoted	1916	1997	1942	Russian	Male
Vasily Borisenkov	Василий Борисенков	New	Member	1927	2005	1946	Russian	Male
Leonid Borodin	Леонид Бородин	Candidate	Promoted	1923	2008	1948	Russian	Male
Vasily Boytsov	Василий Бойцов	New	Candidate	1908	1997	1939	Russian	Male
Aleksandr Chakovsky	Александр Чаковский	Candidate	Candidate	1913	1994	1941	Russian	Male
Boris Chaplin	Бори́с Ча́плин	New	Candidate	1931	2015	1961	Russian	Male
Viktor Chebrikov	Виктор Че́бриков	Candidate	Member	1923	1999	1950	Ukrainian	Male
Vladimir Demchenko	Иван Густов	Candidate	Candidate	1920	1991	1946	Russian	Male
Vasily Demidenko	Василий Демиденко	Candidate	Promoted	1930	1998	1955	Ukrainian	Male
Aleksandr Filatov	Александр Филатов	Candidate	Member	1922	2016	1947	Russian	Male
Alexandra Fominykh	Александра Фоминых	Candidate	Promoted	1925	2004	1961	Russian	Female
Gennady Fomin	Геннадий Фомин	Candidate	Member	1936	Alive	1963	Russian	Male
Vasily Frolov	Василий Фролов	Candidate	Candidate	1914	1994	1944	Russian	Male
Yevgeny Fyodorov	Евге́ний Фёдоров	New	Candidate	1910	1981	1955	Russian	Male
Mikhail Georgadze	Михаил Георгадзе	Candidate	Candidate	1912	1982	1942	Georgian	Male
Ivan Gerasymov	Иван Герасимов	New	Candidate	1921	2008	1942	Ukrainian	Male
Pyotr Gorchakov	Пётр Горчаков	Candidate	Candidate	1917	2002	1939	Russian	Male
Basan Gorodovikov	Баса́н Городовико́в	Candidate	Not	1910	1983	1939	Buzavan	Male
Boris Gostev	Бори́с Го́стев	New	Member	1927	2015	1954	Russian	Male
Vladimir Govorov	Владимир Говоров	New	Member	1924	2006	1946	Russian	Male
Nikolai Gribachev	Николай Грибачёв	Candidate	Candidate	1910	1992	1943	Russian	Male
Anatoly Gribkov	Анато́лий Грибко́в	New	Member	1919	2008	1943	Russian	Male
Ivan Grintsov	Иван Гринцов	Candidate	Candidate	1935	2019	1960	Ukrainian	Male
Konstantin Grushevoy	Константин Грушевой	Candidate	Candidate	1906	1982	1927	Ukrainian	Male
Ivan Gustov	Иван Густов	Candidate	Member	1911	1996	1932	Russian	Male
Oles Gonchar	Оле́сь Гонча́р	New	Candidate	1918	1995	1946	Ukrainian	Male
Ali Ibragimov	Али Ибрагимов	Candidate	Not	1913	1985	1943	Azerbaijani	Male
Mustakhim Iksanov	Мустахим Иксанов	New	Candidate	1926	1991	1951	Kazakh	Male
Kirill Ilyashenko	Кирилл Ильяшенко	Candidate	Died	1915	1980	1945	Moldovan	Male
Nikolay Inozemtsev	Никола́й Инозе́мцев	Candidate	Member	1921	1982	1943	Russian	Male
Mikhail Iovchuk	Михаил Иовчук	Candidate	Not	1908	1990	1926	Belarusian	Male
Vasily Isayev	Василий Исаев	Candidate	Member	1917	2008	1939	Russian	Male
Aleksandr Ishkov	Александр Ишков	Candidate	Not	1905	1988	1927	Russian	Male
Bilar Kabaloyev	Семён Ислюков	Candidate	Candidate	1915	1998	1939	Chuvash	Male
Yakov Kabkov	Яков Кабков	Candidate	Candidate	1908	2001	1930	Russian	Male
Dmitry Kachin	Дмитрий Качин	New	Member	1929	2025	1953	Russian	Male
Aleksey Kalashnikov	Алексей Калашников	New	Candidate	1914	2006	1939	Russian	Male
Kallibek Kamalov	Каллибе́к Кама́лов	Candidate	Candidate	1926	Alive	1946	Karakalpak	Male
Vladimir Karlov	Влади́мир Ка́рлов	Candidate	Promoted	1914	1994	1940	Russian	Male
Nikolai Kirichenko	Николай Кириченко	Candidate	Promoted	1923	1986	1944	Ukrainian	Male
Valery Kharazov	Валерий Харазов	New	Not	1918	2013	1944	Russian	Male
Makhmadullo Kholov	Махмадулло Холов	Candidate	Candidate	1920	1989	1947	Tajik	Male
Tikhon Khrennikov	Тихон Хренников	New	Candidate	1913	2007	1940	Russian	Male
Valter Klauson	Вальтер Клаусон	Candidate	Candidate	1913	1988	1943	Estonian	Male
Aleksandr Klimov	Александр Климов	Candidate	Died	1914	1979	1939	Russian	Male
Mikhail Kobylchak	Михаил Кобыльчак	New	Not	1918	2004	1939	Ukrainian	Male
Gennady Kolbin	Геннадий Колбин	New	Member	1927	1998	1954	Russian	Male
Vyacheslav Kochemasov	Вячеслав Кочемасов	Candidate	Candidate	1918	1998	1944	Russian	Male
Nikolay Kochetkov	Николай Кочетков	Candidate	Not	1927	2002	1957	Russian	Male
Olga Kolchina	Ольга Колчина	Candidate	Candidate	1918	2017	1946	Russian	Female
Aleksandr Kolesnikov	Александр Колесников	Candidate	Member	1930	2008	1966	Ukrainian	Male
Richard Kosolapov	Ричард Косолапов	Candidate	Member	1930	2020	1957	Russian	Male
Mikhail Kozlov	Михаил Козлов	New	Not	1917	2004	1939	Russian	Male
Sergey Kozlov	Сергей Козлов	Candidate	Candidate	1923	2011	1947	Russian	Male
Yevgeny Kozlovsky	Евге́ний Козло́вский	New	Candidate	1929	2022	1955	Russian	Male
Gleb Kriulin	Глеб Криулин	Candidate	Candidate	1923	1988	1945	Belarusian	Male
Viktor Krotov	Виктор Кротов	Comeback	Member	1912	1986	1956	Russian	Male
Ivan Kudinov	Иван Кудинов	Candidate	Member	1922	1990	1946	Russian	Male
Lev Kulidzhanov	Лев Кулиджанов	New	Candidate	1924	2002	1962	Armenian	Male
Askar Kunaev	Аскар Кунаев	New	Candidate	1929	1999	1971	Kazakh	Male
Sakan Kusainov	Сакан Кусаинов	New	Not	1917	1989	1943	Kazakh	Male
Viktor Lebedev	Виктор Лебедев	New	Died	1917	1978	1941	Russian	Male
Konstantin Lebedev	Виктор Лебедев	New	Candidate	1918	2006	1941	Russian	Male
Timbora Malbakhov	Тимбо́ра Мальба́хов	Candidate	Candidate	1917	1999	1942	Kabardian	Male
Juozas Maniušis	Иосиф Манюшис	Candidate	Not	1910	1987	1945	Lithuanian	Male
Gury Marchuk	Гурий Марчук	New	Member	1925	2013	1947	Russian	Male
Vladimir Maslov	Владимир Маслов	New	Not	1925	1988	1945	Russian	Male
Mikhail Matafonov	Михаил Матафонов	New	Candidate	1928	2012	1952	Russian	Male
Nikolai Merenishchev	Николай Меренищев	New	Candidate	1919	2010	1945	Russian	Male
Vladimir Mikulich	Владимир Микулич	New	Member	1920	2000	1943	Belarusian	Male
Fedir Morhun	Фёдор Моргу́н	New	Promoted	1924	2008	1952	Ukrainian	Male
Yefim Novosolov	Ефи́м Новосёлов	New	Not	1906	1990	1925	Ukrainian	Male
Sabit Orujov	Сабит Оруджев	New	Member	1912	1981	1939	Azerbaijani	Male
Viktor Paputin	Виктор Папутин	Candidate	Died	1926	1979	1945	Russian	Male
Pyotr Paskar	Пётр Паскарь	Candidate	Candidate	1929	2025	1956	Moldovan	Male
Boris Pastukhov	Борис Пастухов	Candidate	Promoted	1933	2021	1959	Russian	Male
Zurab Pataridze	Зураб Патаридзе	New	Candidate	1928	1982	1955	Georgian	Male
Erlen Pervyshin	Эрлен Первышин	New	Candidate	1932	2004	1959	Russian	Male
Viktor Pereudin	Виктор Переудин	New	Not	1923	2001	1959	Russian	Male
Nikolai Petrovichev	Николай Петровичев	Candidate	Member	1918	2002	1939	Russian	Male
Boris Petrovsky	Борис Петровский	Candidate	Not	1908	2004	1942	Russian	Male
Pyotr Pimenov	Пётр Пименов	Candidate	Died	1915	1980	1943	Russian	Male
Pyotr Pleshakov	Пётр Плешаков	New	Promoted	1922	1987	1944	Russian	Male
Maria Poberey	Раиса Бельских	Candidate	Not	1924	1981	1957	Russian	Female
Yakiv Pogrebnyak	Я́ков Погребня́к	Candidate	Candidate	1928	2016	1943	Ukrainian	Male
Alexander Pokryshkin	Я́ков Погребня́к	New	Candidate	1913	1985	1942	Russian	Male
Yuri Polukarov	Юрий Полукаров	New	Candidate	1920	1993	1951	Russian	Male
Viktor Polyakov	Ви́ктор Поляко́в	New	Member	1915	2004	1944	Russian	Male
Aleksandr Protazanov	Александр Протозанов	New	Candidate	1914	2006	1944	Ukrainian	Male
Vladimir Ptitsyn	Влади́мир Пти́цын	New	Member	1925	2006	1946	Russian	Male
Yuri Pugachov	Юрий Пугачёв	New	Candidate	1926	2007	1947	Russian	Male
Bektash Rakhimov	Бекташ Рахимов	New	Candidate	1924	2009	1944	Uzbek	Male
Oleg Rakhmanin	Олег Рахманин	New	Member	1924	2010	1942	Russian	Male
Aleksey Romanov	Алексе́й Рома́нов	Candidate	Candidate	1908	1998	1939	Russian	Male
Pyotr Rozenko	Пётр Розенко	Candidate	Not	1907	1991	1943	Ukrainian	Male
Jurijs Rubenis	Юрий Рубэн	Candidate	Candidate	1925	2004	1953	Latvian	Male
Aleksey Rybakov	Алексей Рыбаков	New	Candidate	1925	2016	1945	Russian	Male
Sergey Savin	Сергей Савин	Candidate	Member	1924	1990	1951	Russian	Male
Nikolai Savinkin	Николай Савинкин	Candidate	Member	1913	1993	1927	Russian	Male
Vladimir Semyonov	Владимир Семёнов	Candidate	Candidate	1911	1992	1938	Russian	Male
Ivan Serbin	Иван Сербин	Candidate	Died	1910	1981	1931	Russian	Male
Maksim Sergeyev	Максим Сергеев	Candidate	Not	1928	1987	1960	Russian	Male
Vasily Shauro	Василий Шауро	Candidate	Candidate	1912	2007	1940	Belarusian	Male
Sergey Shaydurov	Сергей Шайдуров	Candidate	Not	1926	1998	1952	Russian	Male
Aleksandra Shevchenko	Александра Шевченко	Candidate	Not	1926	2000	1954	Ukrainian	Female
Grigory Shirshin	Григо́рий Ши́ршин	Candidate	Not	1934	Alive	1958	Tuvan	Male
Aleksandr Shitov	Александр Шитов	Candidate	Candidate	1925	2001	1955	Russian	Male
Ivan Sinitsyn	Иван Синицын	Candidate	Not	1917	1988	1940	Russian	Male
Aleksandr Smirnov	Александр Смирнов	Candidate	Candidate	1912	1997	1937	Russian	Male
Georgy Smirnov	Гео́ргий Смирно́в	New	Candidate	1922	1999	1943	Russian	Male
Sergey Smirnov	Гео́ргий Смирно́в	New	Not	1918	2009	1951	Russian	Male
Mikhail Smirtyukov	Михаил Смиртюков	New	Not	1909	2004	1940	Russian	Male
Vitaly Sologub	Виталий Сологу	Candidate	Candidate	1926	2004	1927	Ukrainian	Male
Ivan Sosnov	Иван Соснов	Candidate	Candidate	1908	1993	1940	Russian	Male
Akhmatbek Suyumbayev	Ахматбек Суюмбаев	Candidate	Not	1920	1993	1942	Kyrghyz	Male
Nikolai Talyzin	Никола́й Талы́зин	New	Member	1929	1991	1960	Russian	Male
Vladimir Terebilov	Владимир Теребилов	New	Candidate	1916	2004	1940	Russian	Male
Nikolai Timofeyev	Николай Тимофеев	New	Not	1913	1988	1943	Russian	Male
Georgy Tsinev	Гео́ргий Цинёв	New	Member	1907	1996	1932	Ukrainian	Male
Semon Tsvigun	Семён Цвигу́н	Candidate	Member	1917	1982	1940	Ukrainian	Male
Aleksandr Udalov	Александр Удалов	Candidate	Not	1922	2014	1949	Russian	Male
Lyubov Ulitina	Любовь Улитина	New	Not	1938	2021	1970	Russian	Female
Vladimir Vaslyaev	Владимир Васляев	New	Died	1924	1980	1944	Ukrainian	Male
Ivan Vladychenko	Ива́н Влады́ченко	Candidate	Candidate	1924	2022	1943	Ukrainian	Male
Aleksandr Vlasov	Александр Власов	New	Member	1932	2002	1956	Russian	Male
Lev Volodarsky	Лев Волода́рский	New	Member	1911	1989	1939	Russian	Male
Georgy Vorobyov	Георгий Воробьёв	New	Member	1911	1989	1939	Russian	Male
Georgy Yegorov	Гео́ргий Его́ров	New	Not	1918	2008	1942	Russian	Male
Natalya Yeliseyeva	Наталия Елисеева	New	Not	1927	2015	1954	Russian	Female
Filipp Yermash	Филипп Ермаш	New	Candidate	1923	2002	1945	Russian	Male
Vadim Zagladin	Вади́м Загла́дин	New	Member	1927	2006	1955	Russian	Male
Konstantin Zarodov	Константин Зародов	Candidate	Candidate	1920	1982	1940	Russian	Male
Yuri Zhukov	Юрий Жуков;	New	Candidate	1908	1991	1943	Russian	Male
