= Lev Gatovsky =

Soviet economist (1903–1997)

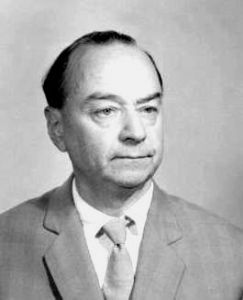
- Born: Lev Markovich Gatovsky; 26 July 1903; Minsk, Russian Empire
- Died: 18 April 1997 (aged 93); Moscow, Russia
- Education: Ph.D. in Economics
- Alma mater: Plekhanov Russian University of Economics
- Occupation: Economist
- Employer: Institute of Economics of the Soviet Academy of Sciences
- Known for: Early provider of a theoretical framework for the study of the Soviet economy from a perspective of political economy

Lev Markovich Gatovsky (Russian: Лев Маркович Гатовский; 26 July 1903 – 18 April 1997) was a Soviet economist, being one of the first who tried to create a theoretical framework in which to understand the nature of the socialist project taking place in the Soviet Union from a political economy perspective. He became director of the Institute of Economics of the Soviet Academy of Sciences, later renamed Russian Academy of Sciences, from 1965 to 1971. Apart from his general academic work, he contributed to several major economic developments such as the first two five-year economic plans and the 1965 Soviet Economic Reform, as well as editing the first Political Economy textbook of the USSR.

== Biography ==
Lev Gatovsky was born into a Jewish family on 26 July 1903 in the city of Minsk, in the Russian Empire, later Soviet Union, and current Belarus. He died on 18 April 1997, in Moscow, current Russia.

His father, Mordukh Girshevich Gatovsky (1871—?), worked as a doctor, becoming the head of a regional outpatient clinic after the 1917 revolution. When Gatovsky was seventeen, he joined the Komsomol and became one of the secretaries of the Minsk district and city Komsomol committee (1920–1921). During the decade of the 1920s he also conducted propagandistic lecture work.

In 1921, Gatovsky became one of the first students of the Belarusian State University in Minsk. During this time, he also lectured on political economy at the Central Party School of the Communist Party of Belarus. In September 1922 he moved to Moscow, where he entered the second year of the Plekhanov Russian University of Economics, graduating in 1925 with a degree in trade economics.

In 1927 he joined the All-Union Communist Party (Bolsheviks). Already while studying at the Institute of National Economy, he joined the Trade Inspectorate of the People's Commissariat of the Workers' and Peasants' Inspectorate of the USSR (NK RKI USSR), first as an inspector, then as a senior inspector.

In 1928, after graduating from graduate school at the Russian Association of Scientific Institutes of Social Sciences (RANION), Gatovsky went to work at the USSR State Planning Committee as head of the price sector. He became also a member of the Central Planning Bureau and the Presidium of the Research Institute of the USSR State Planning Committee. He directly participated in the preparation of the first and second five-year plans, the first national economic annual plans, and participated in the preparation of all subsequent five-year plans.

From 1931 to 1936, Gatovsky worked at the Institute of Economics of the Communist Academy, where he headed the section of Soviet trade (until 1933). From 1933 to 1937, Gatovsky was primarily active in the Central Directorate of National Economic Accounting (TSUNKHU) of the USSR State Planning Committee. During this period, he served as the head of the trade turnover department, led the national economic balance department, and was a member of the TSUNKHU board. In 1934, he defended his doctoral dissertation, and in 1935 he was awarded the academic title of professor.

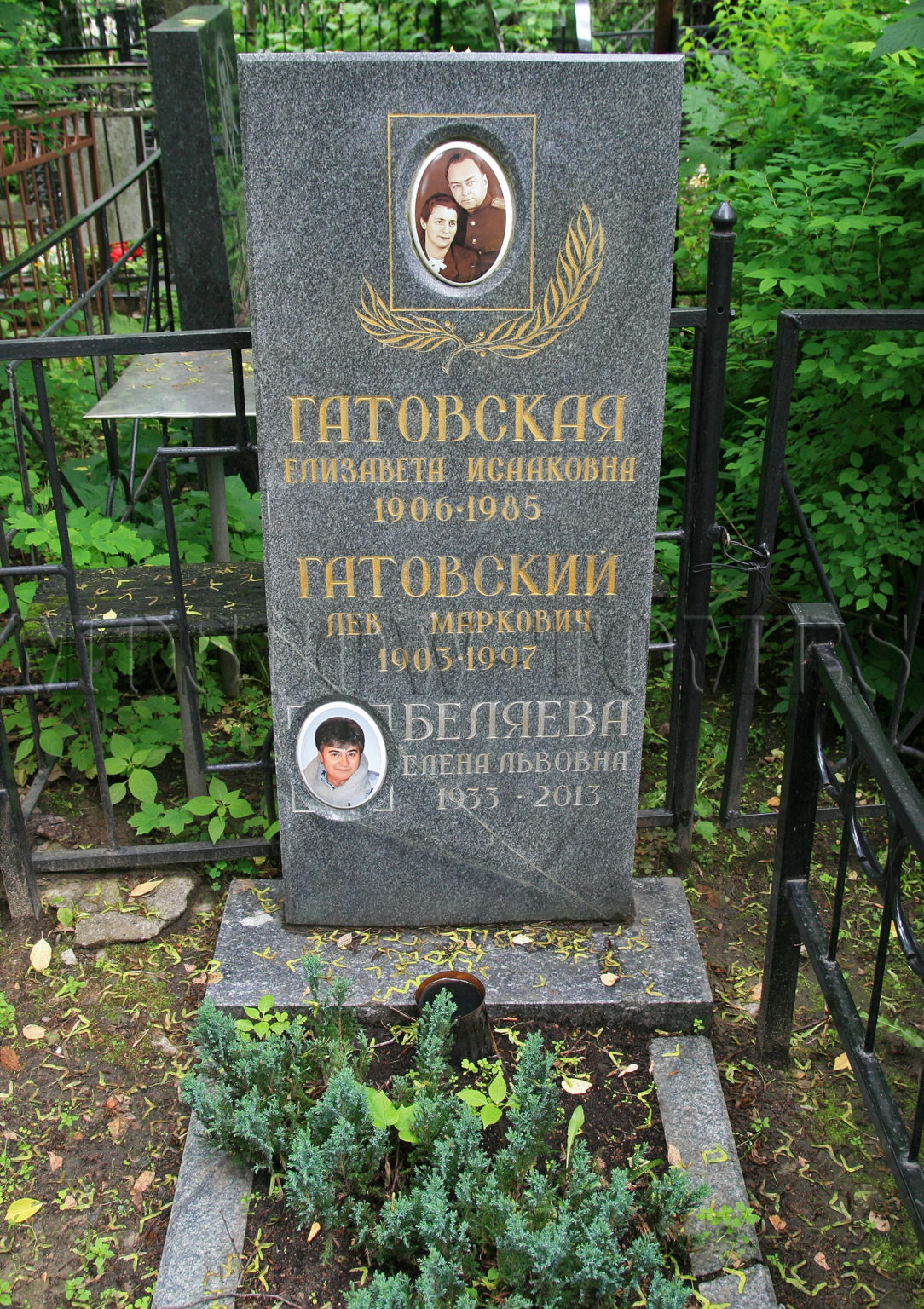
Tombstone of Gatovsky, his wife, and daughter at the Vagankovskoye cemetery (site 7)

In 1936, after the liquidation of the Communist Academy he started working at the Institute of Economics of the Soviet Academy of Sciences, where he became head of the section, senior researcher as well as deputy director, until 1941.

During World War II, him and other 26 members of the Institute of Economics of the Soviet Academy of Sciences volunteered in the 21st Infantry Division. At this time, he was a member of the editorial board, head of the department and special war correspondent for the Krasnaya Zvezda newspaper. At the end of the war he was demobilized with the rank of colonel.

In 1960, Gatovsky was elected corresponding member of the USSR Academy of Sciences in the Department of Economic, Philosophical and Legal Sciences, specializing in the political economy of socialism. In 1965, he became director of the Institute of Economics of the USSR Academy of Sciences and held this post until 1971, after which he continued to work at the institute as chief researcher.

He died in Moscow on 18 April 1997, and was buried at the Vagankovo Cemetery.

=== Lectures ===
Apart from the academic positions he occupied, since 1924, he also gave lectures relating to political economy in several universities and institutions. The list include: the Workers' Faculty of the Institute of National Economy "G.V. Plekhanov"; the Moscow Planning Institute; the Moscow Planning Academy; Moscow State University; Moscow Communist University "Ya.M. Sverdlov"; the Economic Institute of the Red Professorship; and the Academy of Social Sciences under the CPSU Central Committee (1946–1956).

==== International lectures ====
In late October 1957, Gatovsky represented the Soviet Union at the "Week of Study of Soviet Economics" in Brussels, Belgium. The event, funded by the University of Brussels' Institute of Sociology and organized by A. Waters, brought together economists from both capitalist and Soviet countries.

Gatovsky presented "Development of Soviet Economics and its Motive Forces," addressing the mechanisms guiding the Soviet economy, material incentives, democratic centralism, planning innovations, wage policies, and economic accounting. His report highlighted the theoretical aspects of Soviet economic growth and management.

Upon returning, Gatovsky reported to the Academy of Sciences of the USSR, which acknowledged the value of Soviet participation in the seminar. They recommended increasing the study and critique of foreign literature on Soviet economics, publishing Soviet works in foreign languages, and enhancing international scientific contacts.

In October 1958, Gatovsky continued to disseminate Soviet economic theories by delivering two lectures in Paris, France. The first, "The Up-to-date Development of Planning in the USSR," was presented at the Paris Center for the Study of Foreign Policy. The second, "Methods of Management of the Economy of the USSR," was given at the Institute of Applied Economy of Paris. These lectures further reinforced Soviet economic principles and practices on an international platform.

=== Publications ===
Gatovsky actively participated in several publications. He became a member of the editorial board of the magazine "Planned Economy" (1929–1930), executive editor of the magazine "Issues of Soviet Trade" (1937–1939), and the newspaper "Soviet Trade" (1937–1939). In 1939 he also became a member of the editorial office of the Bolshevik magazine until his removal in 1949. Finally, he became editor-in-chief of the journal Problems of Economics from 1957 to 1965 and member of the editorial board of the publication "Socialism and Communism".

==== Removal from "Bolshevik" magazine ====
In the summer of 1949, L.M. Gatovsky was criticized for his overly favorable review of N.A. Voznesensky's book "The Military Economy of the USSR during the Patriotic War." As a result, the Central Committee of the All-Union Communist Party of Bolsheviks decreed his removal from his roles in the "Bolshevik" magazine and the Higher Party School:

- 26 May 1949; communication to the Secretary of the Central Committee of the All-Union Communist Party (Bolsheviks): P. Fedoseev, Editor-in-Chief of the "Bolshevik" magazine, reported to the Secretary Malenkov about the excessive praise for Voznesensky's book among economists at the magazine, particularly by Gatovsky. Despite editorial objections, Gatovsky's review was published with some modifications. According to him, Gatovsky had continued promoting the book as a significant Marxist–Leninist work, influencing other staff members like Koshelev and Kuzminov to include more quotes from the book in their articles. Fedoseev admitted his responsibility for allowing the proliferation of these quotes and suggested that the editorial board needed new, more qualified members to improve the magazine's quality.
- Communication from M.A. Suslov to J.V. Stalin about the mistakes of the editors of the Bolshevik magazine: M.A. Suslov, member of the committee, also reported to Stalin that the "Bolshevik" magazine made a serious mistake by excessively praising Voznesensky's book, treating it as a significant scientific work without proper justification. Suslov also recommended restructuring the editorial board to transform the magazine into a robust theoretical organ for the party. He proposed removing Editor-in-Chief Fedoseev, along with editorial board members Alexandrov, Iovchuk, Gatovsky, and Koshelev.
- 13 July 1949: Politburo Resolution for the "Bolshevik" magazine:

"The Central Committee of the All-Union Communist Party (Bolsheviks) decides:

1. For failure to provide proper management of the Bolshevik magazine and incorrect methods in work, remove Comrade P.N. Fedoseev. from his post as editor-in-chief of the Bolshevik magazine and reprimand him.

Remove t.t. from the membership of the editorial board of the magazine "Bolshevik". Alexandrova G.F. and Iovchuk M.T.

Release from work in the magazine "Bolshevik" t.t. Gatovsky and Koshelev... "

== Academic work ==
Gatovsky was a prolific economist, publishing over 300 scientific works covering a broad range of topics, including the political economy of socialism, planning theory and methodology, economic mechanisms, economic statistics, trade economics, pricing, economic accounting, economic incentives, and the economics of scientific and technological progress, particularly the economics of science. He also delved into the efficiency theory of social production and military economics. Additionally, Gatovsky served as the editor for numerous significant economic and statistical works, including several major monographs and various methodological guides.

In 1929, Gatovsky published an in-depth analysis of the grain market, revealing significant supply imbalances of agricultural products caused by the "grain strike" that followed the war alarm of 1927.

During the 1940s and 1950s, he produced several works on the theory of the Soviet economy, offering a political and economic examination to the challenges faced during the transition period and the construction of socialism. His research focused on establishing and refining the planned economic mechanism, emphasizing the practical application of commodity-money relations and prices within the framework of planned economic development.

In the late 1950s, Gatovsky shifted his focus to a burgeoning area of economics: the economics of scientific and technological progress. He developed theoretical frameworks for this field, analyzing the laws governing economic and technical progress and proposing the creation of a new discipline, the economics of science. Gatovsky examined the role of science as a management object and its functions, formulating theories on the integration of science and production and the dynamics of scientific and production cycles. His suggestions and recommendations for managing scientific and technological progress were implemented in practical economic management, notably in the electrical industry's shift to end-to-end planning, which linked scientific research, technical development, production, and new technology application. He also advocated for the introduction of stepped pricing systems (a system of premiums and discounts), combining scientific and technological planning with broader economic planning, developing scientific and technical programs, and promoting scientific and technical associations.

In 1963, Gatovsky presented a report to the Presidium of the USSR Academy of Sciences, the USSR State Planning Committee, and the USSR State Labor Committee, proposing improvements to the economic mechanism of self-financing. This report, based on research by the Scientific Council of the USSR Academy of Sciences, which Gatovsky chaired, was approved and adopted as a draft, influencing subsequent policy decisions and practices.

In 1964–1965, Gatovsky played a direct role in preparing the 1965 economic reform, which aimed to overhaul the planning and management of the Soviet Union's national economy.

=== Government intervention and the grain market ===
In 1929, Gatovsky published a comprehensive study of the grain market, highlighting significant imbalances in the supply of agricultural products following the crisis of agricultural distribution (mainly in grain deliveries) that had developed from 1927. Despite the low marketability of grain farming during this period, pricing was predominantly influenced by the kulaks (wealthy peasants), who, although representing only 5% of the rural population, controlled a substantial portion of the grain market and production means, including agricultural machinery. Socialist enterprises, such as collective and state farms, demonstrated the highest marketability, yet their overall contribution to gross grain production remained minimal.

Gatovsky's study revealed that market prices for bread doubled from December 1927 to December 1928, while fodder prices increased significantly. Although the state procured grain and sold baked bread at fixed prices, flour on the open market was often more expensive, leading peasants to retain raw grain and purchase baked bread to feed livestock. This discrepancy contributed to a decline in livestock numbers, as high fodder prices discouraged animal husbandry. Consequently, the price of cows and horses fell, and the price index ratio for milk to forage decreased significantly in various regions.

The study also indicated that the rising free market prices for grain feed had also affected the equivalents of other livestock products in grain terms. For instance, the amount of grain that could be purchased with a set amount of butter or eggs decreased significantly over the studied period, reflecting the broader market pressures on agricultural exchange values.

In response, the state significantly increased procurement prices in 1928, particularly for feed crops, to mitigate these market imbalances. In some regions, procurement prices for meat even surpassed market prices, reflecting the urgent need to stabilize agricultural production and prices.

This increase in private agricultural prices led to a general rise in national prices, despite state efforts to reduce prices for industrial goods to address the "scissors crisis" (the disparity between agricultural and industrial prices). The rural sector absorbed the benefits intended for the broader population, causing an increase in living costs within the agricultural goods sector. Trade margins also surged, significantly impacting urban real incomes. Consequently, the real incomes of the urban population decreased, while the gains for rural areas, particularly the kulaks, from state price regulation grew substantially.

Gatovsky concluded that the high pressure of free market prices could have adverse consequences for the national economic system. These included impacts on real wages and costs, reduced profitability of intensive agricultural sectors, exacerbated rural demand for manufactured goods, and a weakened monetary system. His analysis underscored the complex interplay between state-controlled pricing policies and market dynamics, emphasizing the need for careful regulation to maintain economic stability and equitable growth.

=== Definition of the Soviet economy ===
The first known attempt by an economist to define and create a framework for the Soviet economy is credited to Eugene Preobrazhensky, who published New Economics in 1925. In 1931, Gatovsky expanded this analysis from a Political Economy perspective when he tackled the issue of whether the Soviet economy could be defined as "socialist". He presented this analysis in the "Draft programme on the theory of the Soviet economy", published in the Planovoye Khozyaistvo journal.

In this draft, Gatovsky has a distinct shift in tone and tools of analysis between different sections. For the pre-1929 period, he draws heavily on general Marxist theory and Lenin's specific contributions. The discussions of political, economic, and intellectual struggles during this time reflect the intense political conflicts and hardships of the era.

Consequently, these analyses often seem more descriptive than analytical, with a logic that is ideological rather than philosophical.

The analysis that Gatovsky makes later on in the draft about his own period includes more perspectives. He includes economic generalizations in Marxist terms, such as "a new relation of class forces," indicating shifts in class dynamics under socialism, and "the predominance of the socialist sector in the entire economy," highlighting the dominant role of state-owned enterprises.

Additionally, Gatovsky employs formal dialectical logic, portraying the last stage of the New Economic Policy (NEP) as the negative phase, characterized by limited capitalist elements, and the entry into socialism as the positive phase, marked by the consolidation of socialist principles. He emphasizes the "basic moments" and "special study" of this transitional period.

He calls for a detailed examination of the distinction between the "foundation of socialist economy," referring to the initial establishment of socialist economic structures, and the "completion of socialist economy," denoting the full realization of a socialist economy. This is linked to the "basic features of the national economic plan for 1931," aimed at finalizing the construction of socialist economic foundations. These elements culminate in the heading "resolution of the problem of who's to be master in the national economy as a whole," addressing the central question of control and authority within the national economy.

Gatovsky proceeds by outlining the "regularities" of the economy, referring to the consistent patterns and principles observed in socialist economic development, and the methodological principles for their study, indicating the systematic approaches used to analyze these economic phenomena.

Considered a formal study in dialectical logic, it examines "the proletariat as the chief productive force and exerciser of class hegemony." Meaning, that he views the working class (proletariat) as the primary driving force behind production and as the dominant class exerting control and leadership within the socialist society.

==== Achieving communism ====
Finally in his draft, he proposes what he defines as the basic law of the movement to communism:

"Socialist nationalization of production on the basis of industrialization and the restriction, expulsion, and final dissolution of capitalist elements"

Then, he provides his definition of "political economy in the wide sense":

"The relation of economics and politics, economics and technology, social way of life and consciousness, in conditions of planned economy. Essence and Appearance in planned economy and the process of Defetishization"

Appearance, would represent in the analysis what is normally considered "the phenomena", and the Essence would be the laws of structure and process to which the phenomena obeys. Finally, Defetishization would be the process in which public opinion comes to see the economy for what it really is and represents. This would play in opposition to "the blind forces of the market" in capitalism. Or what Hegel would call the "customary tenderness to things".

==== Logical confusion ====
In the criticism that J. Miller does in his article "A Political Economy of Socialism in the Making" he states that Gatovsky encounters "logical confusion" when he tries to define abstract concepts within Soviet political economy.

In his draft, Gatovsky engages in complex exercises in dialectical logic, focusing on planning and economic regularities, or "zakonomernosti". He discusses methodological principles for studying these regularities, particularly under the dual development characteristic of the Soviet system, which includes both socialist and transitional elements. Moreover, Gatovsky introduces the concept of the "degree of concretization" of these regularities, which refers to how abstract principles can be applied to the concrete conditions of the Soviet economy. This involves examining how far one can abstract economic principles from political realities and the specific conditions of the USSR. He posits that Lenin's theory of socialism is crucial for understanding these economic regularities.

However, Miller criticizes Gatovsky for the speculative nature of his analysis, arguing that he assumes these regularities exist without clearly defining what they are. Terms like "degree of concretization" illustrate the abstract and theoretical nature of his discussion, which lacks concrete definitions or examples. Miller points out logical confusions in Gatovsky's work, such as conflating the "special active role of productive relations" with the superstructure, which indicates a misunderstanding of Marxist theory where the superstructure typically refers to cultural, political, and ideological systems rather than economic relations. Miller concludes that Soviet economists in the early 1930s struggled to create a unified framework that integrated Soviet political economy theory with practical economic policy, which was becoming increasingly complex.

=== The need for a Soviet party ===
In 1957, for the celebration of the 40th anniversary of the October Revolution, the Institute of Economics of the USSR Academy of Sciences published the collective work "Soviet Socialist Economics, 1917–1957". This book, that later that year received the USSR Academy of Sciences prize, featured an article by Lev Gatovsky titled "The Foundations for Constructing a Socialist Economy in the USSR". In this article he examined the transformative impact of the Revolution on social and economic relations, and highlighted the role of the revolution in debunking the myths of the time regarding the permanence and stability of private property, as well as the working class's capability to manage state affairs and the economy. For the analysis, he divided the 40 years since the October Revolution into two historical periods: the first 20 years marked by the transformation from capitalism to socialism and the establishment of a socialist order, and the subsequent 20 years characterized by the further development of socialism and gradual progress towards communism.

For him, the revolution not only facilitated the unrestricted development of productive forces but also demonstrated the advantages of socialism. Using the theoretical foundations of Marxism–Leninism and Lenin's blueprint for building socialism, he illustrated how, under the leadership of the Communist Party, the Soviets achieved remarkable milestones in a historically short period. This includes the industrialization of the country, the challenging collectivization of agriculture, and a significant cultural revolution. That is why he criticises reformist and revisionist assertions about the possibility of a peaceful and spontaneous transition from capitalism to socialism. By addressing the relationship between the economic base and the superstructure, and the productive relations and productive forces during this transition, he remarks the essential role that the Communist Party and the Soviet state had in advancing towards communist economic construction.

Moreover, he emphasized the global historical significance of the Soviet Union's experience and its crucial role for solving contemporary problems. In particular, for the development of socialist economies in the people's democracies of Europe and Asia. While remarking that still, each nation should account for its own historical and national peculiarities.

However, Gatovsky's ideas have faced theoretical criticism from various scholars, even though they did not directly address his work. E. H. Carr and Eric Hobsbawm argued that this deterministic view of history can oversimplify complex developments. On this line, Robert Michels' "Iron Law of Oligarchy" warns of the risks of power concentration within parties, potentially leading to inefficiency and suppression of dissent. From a more economic point of view, Friedrich Hayek and Ludwig von Mises were critical with centralized planning for its lack of market signals and innovation. Regarding the cultural aspect, Antonio Gramsci emphasized the importance of cultural and ideological work alongside economic changes. And finally, Eduard Bernstein and Jürgen Habermas advocated for a more flexible, reformist approach, highlighting the need for adaptability in the socialist practice.

=== The Institute of Economics of the USSR Academy of Science ===
In 1965, Gatovsky became director of the Institute of Economics of the USSR Academy of Science, until his departure in 1971. The main focus on the institute under his direction was on the theoretical study of the socialist reconstruction of the USSR's national economy. It aimed to further develop Marxist–Leninist political economy, combat bourgeois ideology, and denounce the concepts of Right and "Left" deviations. The institute delved into the fundamental questions of Marxist political economy and the Leninist stage of its development, exploring the content and methodology of what was then called the "theory of the Soviet economy."

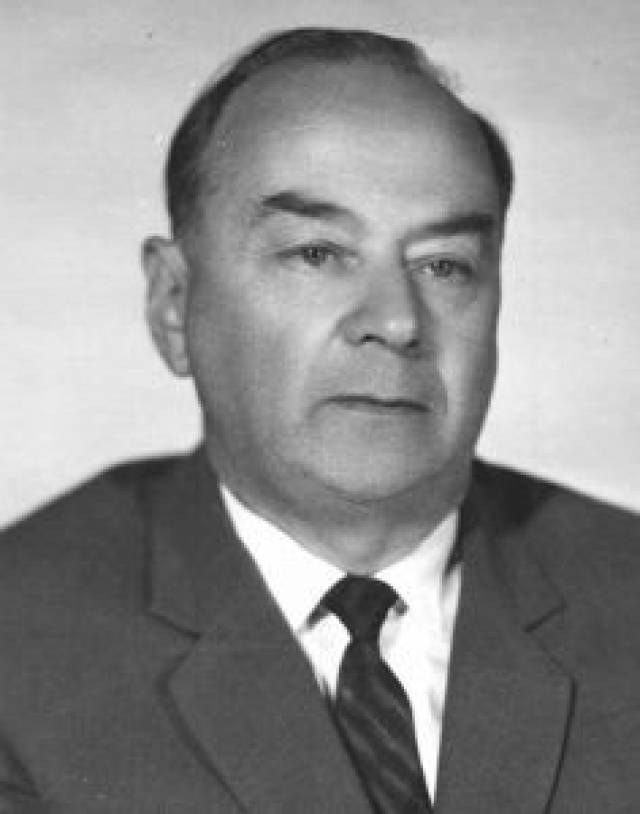
Portrait of Gatovsky for the Institute of Economics

Key areas of study included the theoretical foundations of planning and managing the Soviet economy, socialist industrialization, the technical reconstruction of industry, and the socialist restructuring of agriculture. Additionally, the institute addressed issues related to the relationship between urban and rural areas.

==== The Institute's textbooks ====
Among its significant contributions, the institute prepared and published the first Marxist–Leninist textbooks for higher education institutions, incorporating the practical experiences of socialist construction. These textbooks became essential resources for educating future economists and policymakers in the principles and practices of Soviet economic management.

The Institute developed the "Standard Methodology for Determining the Economic Efficiency of Capital Investments", which was used in the practice of capital investment planning and enterprise design. One of the major results of the work on the economics of industry and commerce was the book "Political Economy" published in 1954 under the editorship of L. M. Gatovsky, K.V. Ostrovityanova, and others. Although originally designed for students, it had a notorious impact on economic circles.

=== Gatovsky's role in the 1965 Economic Reform ===
Under the planned economy system, directives from the central state apparatus regulated enterprises in accordance with the economic plan (known as five-year plans). This approach, rooted in socialist ideology, aimed to distribute labor power and means of production across various sectors of the economy, as articulated by Karl Marx. Centralized economic planning was considered paramount, as highlighted by Joseph Stalin's assertion that plans were binding and shaped the country's economic trajectory.

==== The transition process ====
But State planning had a significant shift with the introduction of the "economic reform" starting in 1965, known as the Soviet Economic Reform of 1965, or the "Liberman reform". Despite official rhetoric proclaiming the improvement and consolidation of centralized planning, the reform ultimately dismantled it. An extensive propaganda campaign vilified centralized planning as obsolete, bureaucratic, and restrictive, attributing its flaws to Stalin's interpretation of socialism.

It receives its name for E.G. Liberman, who criticized the bureaucratic nature of centralized planning. Him and other authors argued that it stifled innovation and hindered the efficient allocation of resources. Liberman advocated for giving enterprises more autonomy and reducing central directives to key indices, thus allowing them to make decisions based on market demand. Similarly, V.S. Nemchinov and V. Trapeznikov, highlighted the need to eliminate bureaucratic tutelage and grant enterprises greater independence. They emphasized the importance of economic initiative and the limitations of purely administrative methods in guiding economic activity. A.M. Rumyantsev, echoed these sentiments by emphasizing the necessity of extending the economic independence and initiative of enterprises. He argued that central planning should focus on formulating general indicators of economic development while allowing enterprises to plan their activities independently. In this context, Gatovsky also took a critical stance against centralized planning believing that excessive bureaucratic control stifled innovation and economic progress. Ultimately he also called for reforms that would empower enterprises to make decisions autonomously:

"Stalin... substituted naked administration by fiat for economic instruments of directing the economy. Regulation of the use of financial resources by enterprises, where it is excessive and too detailed, should be eliminated, and enterprises should be given greater opportunity to manoeuvre with these resources"

==== "Planning from below" ====
Under this "improved" system, enterprises were given key indices from above, with Prime Minister Aleksei Kosygin outlining the limited set of parameters dictated centrally. However, what was not explicitly stated was the transformation of these indices from binding directives to mere guidelines. This shift empowered enterprises to plan their production autonomously, a system termed "planning from below" by Soviet economists. Consequently, the detailed central economic plan became a summation of individual enterprise plans. But this system introduced an element of indeterminacy, characterized by fluctuating plans and prices. While the Soviet state continued to draft overarching economic plans, they were no longer imposed through directives but influenced through economic incentives, mirroring practices in orthodox capitalist countries. Contemporary Soviet economists acknowledged this uncertainty, characterised by its "indeterminacy".

==== The role of profit as production regulator ====
The planned economy system, deeply rooted in Marxist and Stalinist principles, emphasized central directives and the allocation of resources to various sectors of production based on a detailed economic plan. Karl Marx advocated for the distribution of labor and production means through central planning, while Stalin reinforced this with his assertion that plans were binding and crucial for the country's economic development. However, General Secretary Leonid Brezhnev and Kosygin's 1965 reforms fundamentally altered this approach, introducing cost accounting (khozraschot) and emphasizing profitability at the enterprise level.

Liberman and Gatovsky, played pivotal roles in shaping this new economic framework. Liberman pointed out that to assess an enterprise's overall profitability, profit should be related to the value of the social productive assets provided by the state, as this reflects the relative productivity of labor and the total resources used in production, a concept paralleling the capitalist rate of profit. Gatovsky defined profit in a socialist economy as the residual surplus of revenue over costs, serving as an incentive mechanism to enhance enterprise performance. This perspective marked a clear departure from Stalin's approach, who favored in favor long-term, nationwide economic goals, and for Gatovsky the reason profit had not been given importance:

“An obvious belittling and, at times, outright ignoring of the importance of profit... were characteristic of the period of the cult of Stalin’s personality... Profit... was regarded as a purely formal category”.

Nevertheless, the opposition claimed that even Lenin's endorsement of state enterprise profitability under the New Economic Policy (NEP) was intended as a temporary retreat to capitalist principles, not a permanent foundation for socialist development, and thus it was the duty of trade unions to protect worker's interest. The new profit-centric approach sparked debates on the role of profit in a socialist economy, highlighting the tension between maintaining socialist ideals and adopting pragmatic economic reforms to drive efficiency and growth.

==== A "socialist market" ====
The new "socialist market" in the Soviet Union involved a significant emphasis on sale of commodities for profit realization, meaning that enterprises had now to align their production with market demands. Gatovsky, defined the market under socialism as a sphere where state and cooperative enterprises market their products, both means of production and consumer goods. Gatovsky argued that the regulation of social production by the profit motive essentially equates to regulation by market forces, such as supply and demand, similar to those in capitalist economies, and that they should not be disregarded. Liberman, in turn, highlighted competition (or "emulation") among enterprises based on quality, delivery, and price guarantees.

Gatovsky believed that these market forces, through the profit motive, would ensure the efficient allocation of resources and satisfy the people's needs given the existing productive capacities. But in turn, enterprises now would also had to engage in traditional capitalistic elements such as market research, advertising, and direct selling to effectively respond to market dynamics. Nevertheless, Gatovsky emphasized that what is economically profitable for enterprises should align with societal benefits, suggesting that material incentives for enterprise workers are integral to the economic mechanism of the socialist system.

However, the adoption of market mechanisms under socialism drew criticism from Marxist–Leninist principles, which argue that capitalist markets inherently lead to unequal income distribution and misalignment between effective demand and real social demand. This can result in societal issues such as housing shortages despite an apparent surplus of office spaces driven by market profitability. The Soviet economic reform encouraged enterprises to mitigate market risks by forming direct contracts, and thus Soviet law began to mirror capitalist practices in terms of enforcing economic sanctions for contractual breaches. Despite these market-oriented changes, state participation in the market remained significant but limited, particularly in sectors like armaments and public infrastructure.

==== The value of production assets ====
Under the system of cost accountability, the rate of profit serves as the primary measure of an enterprise's efficiency, functioning as a regulator of social production. This rate is calculated as the profit made by an enterprise relative to the total cost of its production assets, which include both fixed assets (land, buildings, machinery) and circulating assets (materials, labor power, and depreciation). While in capitalist societies these assets are referred to as capital, the terminology in the Soviet context avoids this due to the Marxist–Leninist distinction, which only considers assets as capital when associated with the exploitation of the working class. Consequently, contemporary (to Gatovsky) Soviet economists, especially in specialized journals, often referred to these assets as capital too, emphasizing their role in profitability and the necessity of payments for their use.

The introduction of these payments for production assets was a significant change from when these assets were allocated freely. This change aimed to ensure that the rate of profit was grounded in reality and to stimulate better utilization of resources. Differentiated payments based on factors such as quality, location, and size were introduced for natural assets like land, water, and minerals to reflect their varying contributions to profitability. Initially, enterprises made annual payments to the state for these assets, averaging 15% of their value, with new plants receiving a grace period. Later, a lump-sum payment option was introduced, allowing enterprises to finance these payments through bank credits repayable over the depreciation period of the assets. This system incentivized enterprises to extend the operational life of their equipment to maximize profitability. By 1971, these payments constituted a significant portion of state revenue, raising questions about the ownership of production assets, particularly whether they remained state-owned or became the property of the enterprises utilizing them.

==== Credit and interest rates ====
By 1965, 40% of enterprises' circulating assets were funded by bank credits, a figure that rose to 50% by 1976. This change was intended to make enterprises more accountable and economically driven. Under the Soviet system, all banks were state institutions. In particular, the USSR State Bank (Gosbank SSSR), which specialized on short-term loans, and the Construction Bank (Stroibank), which specialized in long-term loans for construction.

Gatovsky and other Soviet economists, such as V. Garbuzov and V. Batyrev, supported this shift, arguing that credit would drive better use of capital and enhance productivity. The reforms included extending long-term credits for capital investments, thus reducing reliance on non-repayable state funds. Interest rates were also adjusted to make loans more economically significant, with the standard rate raised to 4–4.25% for short-term and 4.5–6% for long-term loans by 1967.

“Gratuitous financing – a form of financing that is scarcely connected with cost accounting – will be increasingly replaced by credit, i.e., by a form of loan to the enterprise that must be returned”.

The new credit system aimed to differentiate interest rates based on the financial health and efficiency of enterprises. Well-managed enterprises received more favorable terms, while poorly run ones faced stricter conditions and punitive rates for late repayments. This approach mirrored practices in capitalist economies, where credit is used as a tool to influence economic behavior and performance, although Soviet economist claimed to be "qualitatively different". However, the practices and principles adopted during the reforms showed significant parallels, emphasizing efficiency, profitability, and the strategic use of credit as an economic lever.

== List of works ==
- “On price relationships in 1927/28 and early 1928/29” (1929)
- "Economic victory of the Soviet Union in the Great Patriotic War" (1946)
- "Economic problems of scientific and technological progress" (1971)
- "Issues of the development of the political economy of socialism" (1979)
- "On the nature of Soviet trade at the present stage" (1931)
- "The transition period from capitalism to socialism" (1946)
- "Political Economy" (1954, with K.V. Ostrovityanova, and others.)
- "The Foundations for Constructing a Socialist Economy in the USSR" (1957, co-author and co-editor)
- "Standard Methodology for Determining the Economic Efficiency of Capital Investments" (1960, co-author and editor)
- "The Role of Profit in the Socialist Economy" (1962)
- "Unity of Plan and Cost Accounting" (1965)
- "Problems of economic stimulation and scientific and technological progress" (1967, co-author and editor)
- "The economic mechanism of connection between science and production" (1968)
- "Economic Development For Eastern Europe" (1968, collaborated with an article)
- "Economic Laws and the Construction of Communism: Essays in Political Economy" (1970)
- “Methodology for forecasting economic development of the USSR” (1971, jointly with N. P. Fedorenko and S. A. Heinman)
- "Economic problems of the scientific and technological revolution under socialism" (1975, editor)
- “The material and technical basis of communism” (vols. 1–2, 1977, jointly with E. I. Kapustin and S. A. Heinman)
- "The Efficiency of Scientific and Technological Progress: Management Issues" (1978, editor)
- “Issues of the development of the political economy of socialism” (1979)
- "Scientific and technological progress and the economics of socialism" (1979, editor)
- “Construction of the material and technical base of communism” (vols. 1–2, 1982, jointly with E. I. Kapustin and S. A. Heinman)

== Recognitions ==
Gatovsky's contributions were recognized with several awards, including the Order of the Badge of Honor in 1962 and the Red Banner of Labor in both 1963 and 1973. He received the Order of the October Revolution in 1975 and the Order of Friendship of Peoples in 1983. His military service earned him the Order of the Red Star and medals for the defense of Moscow, victory over Germany, and victory over Japan. His scientific accomplishments were honored with the gold medal from the Exhibition of Achievements of the National Economy and the Sorbonne medal, both awarded in 1971.
