= Konstantin Ostrovityanov =

Soviet economist (1892–1969)

- Константин Островитянов
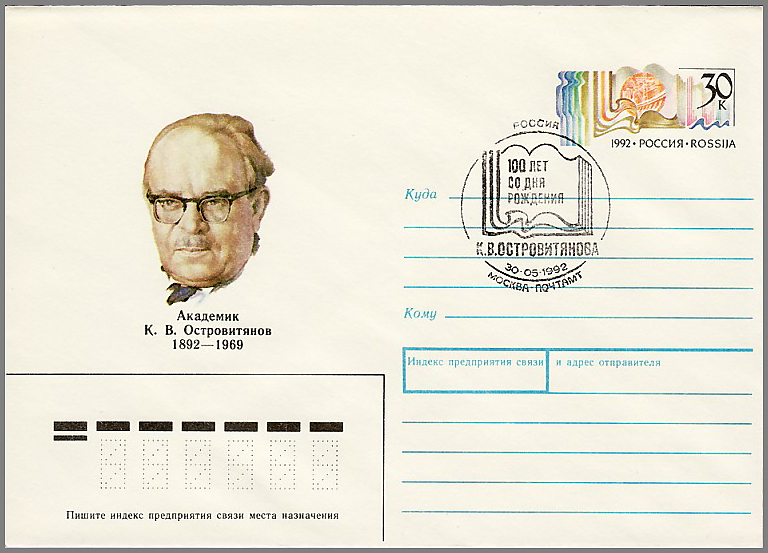
- Russian commemorative envelope of Konstantin Ostrovityanov
- Born: 30 May 1892; Bychki, Tambovsky Uyezd, Tambov Governorate, Russian Empire
- Died: 9 February 1969 (aged 76); Moscow, Russian SFSR, Soviet Union
- Resting place: Novodevichy Cemetery, Moscow
- Education: Moscow Commercial Institute
- Scientific career
- Fields: Political economy
- Workplaces: USSR Academy of Sciences; Leningrad State University
- Notable students: Aleksei Rumyantsev

Konstantin Vasilyevich Ostrovityanov (Russian: Константин Васильевич Островитянов; 30 May [O.S. 18 May] 1892 – 9 February 1969) was a Soviet Marxist economist, academic and public figure.

== Biography ==
Konstantin Ostrovityanov was born into the family of a village priest. In 1912 he graduated from the Tambov Theological Seminary. In the same year he entered the Kyiv Commercial Institute and a year later he transferred to the Moscow Commercial Institute, from which he graduated in 1917. From 1914, Ostrovityanov was a member of the Bolshevik faction of the RSDLP.

In 1916 he was elected a member of the underground Moscow Committee of the RSDLP (B). He was arrested and until February 1917 was in prison in Moscow.

From October 1917 he was secretary of the Zamoskvoretsky Military Revolutionary Committee of Moscow and from 1917 to 1918 he worked as secretary of the factory committee and head of the department of public education.

From 1918 to 1921 he was secretary of the Zamoskvoretsky District Committee of the Russian Communist Party (B) in Moscow, secretary of the Bauman District Committee of the RCP (B) in Moscow, and a member of the bureau of the Moscow City Committee of the RCP (B).

At the end of 1921 he began his scientific activity. He taught at the Party School and worked at the Institute of Economics of the Academy of Sciences of the Soviet Union. In 1928, in co-authorship with I. Lapidus, he prepared and published "An Outline of Political Economy: Political Economy and Soviet Economics", the country's first fundamental two-volume textbook on political economy. At the same time, from 1930 to 1936, he was the academic secretary of the Communist Academy. From 1930 to 1940 he taught at the Moscow Credit and Economic Institute. He was chairman of the Expert Commission on Political Economy of the Committee on Higher Education under the USSR.

From 1943 to 1953 he was head of the Department of Political Economy at the Faculty of Economics of the Moscow State University. From 1946 to 1953 he was director of the Institute of Economics of the USSR Academy of Sciences.

From 1948 to 1954 he was the editor-in-chief of the journal Voprosy Ekonomiki.

From 1949 to 1953, he was Acting Academician-Secretary of the Department of Economic, Philosophical and Legal Sciences of Academy of Sciences of the Soviet Union and from 1953 to 1963 he was the editor-in-chief of the Bulletin of the Academy of Sciences of the Soviet Union. He became an Academician of the Academy of Sciences in 1953.

From October 1953 to 29 June 1962 he served as Vice President of the Academy of Sciences of the Soviet Union.

From 1966 to 1967 he was chairman of the bureau of the Scientific Council on "Economic Laws of the Development of Socialism and its Transformation into Communism."

Together with Dmitri Shepilov, he headed a group of authors and editors of the textbook Political Economy (1954), written on the basis of Joseph Stalin's instructions. He was Editor-in-Chief of the three-volume History of the USSR Academy of Sciences.

Ostrovityanov was a foreign member of many foreign academies, honorary doctor and professor of a number of universities. He headed the Association of Soviet Economic Scientific Institutions and was chairman of the Soviet-Czechoslovak Friendship Society.

He died on 9 February 1969 after a serious illness and was buried in Moscow at the Novodevichy Cemetery.
