= Mikheil Giorgadze =

Mikheil Giorgadze (Georgian: მიხეილ გიორგაძე) may refer to:

- Mikheil Giorgadze (politician) (1912—1982), Georgian-Soviet politician, secretary of the Presidium of the Supreme Soviet of the USSR (1957–1982)
- Mikheil Giorgadze (athlete) (born 1961), Georgian water polo player
