= Fominykh =

Fominykh is a Russian surname. It may refer to the following:

- Alexandra Fominykh (1925–2004), Russian farm worker
- Daniil Fominykh (born 1991), Kazakh cyclist
- Maria Fominykh (born 1987), Russian chess grandmaster
- Mykola Fominykh (1927–1996), Soviet football coach
