= Vagankovo Cemetery =

Cemetery in Moscow

- Ваганьковское кладбище
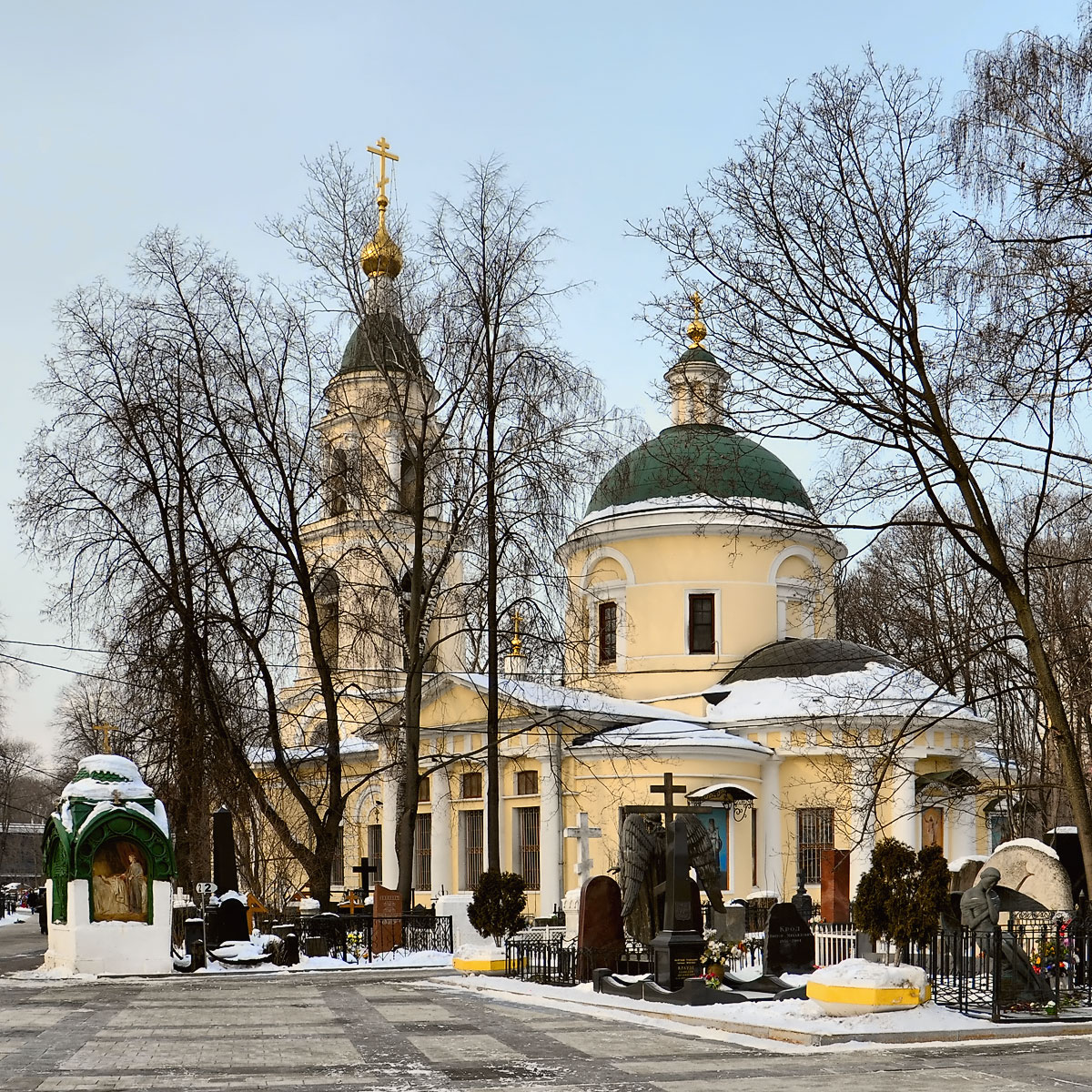
- Church of the Renewal of the Temple of the Resurrection at Vagankovo Cemetery

- Location within European Russia Location within Moscow Location within Moscow Ring Road
- Location in Presnensky District, Moscow

Details
- Established: 1771
- Location: Sergey Makeev Street, 15; Presnensky District, Moscow
- Country: Russia
- Coordinates: 55°46′05″N 37°32′54″E
- Type: Public, military graves, memorial
- Style: Empire style
- Size: 47.9 ha (118 acres)
- No. of graves: More than 100,000
- Website: ritual.mos.ru/perechen/cemetery/the-cemetery-vagankovsky.php

Vagankovo Cemetery (Russian: Ваганьковское кладбище, romanized: Vagan'kovskoye kladbishche) is located in the Presnensky District of Moscow, Russia. It was established in 1771, in an effort to curb an outbreak of bubonic plague in Central Russia. The cemetery was one of those created outside the city proper so as to prevent the contagion from spreading.

More than 500,000 people are estimated to have been buried at Vagankovo Cemetery from 1771 to 1990. As of 1990, the cemetery contained slightly more than 100,000 graves. The vast necropolis contains the mass graves from the Battle of Borodino, the Battle of Moscow, and the Khodynka Tragedy. It is the burial site for many prominent people from the academic, artistic, military, and sports communities of Russia and the old Soviet Union.

The cemetery is served by several Orthodox churches constructed between 1819 and 1823 in the Muscovite version of the Empire style.

== History ==
=== Imperial era ===
Since its beginning as a minor city, burying the dead—with some exceptions (Note: Certain types of the dead could not be buried in church ground, including unbaptised infants, suicides and, after the Great Moscow Synod of 1666–1667, those who died without confession and communion.)—at places of worship had been the custom in Moscow, like other cities in Russia. Peter the Great did not like tombstones on the church ground because he saw them as a hindrance to church ceremonies and disrespect for the church. In 1723, he issued a decree that, in all cities in the Empire, only "eminent persons" should be buried in churches, and the rest in monasteries or parish churches outside cities. This decree was not enforced, however, as he died shortly afterwards in 1725—leaving the custom of burying the dead in churches unchanged.

In 1771, Catherine the Great, in an effort to curb the bubonic plague epidemic in Central Russia, by decree forbade her subjects to bury those who had died of the plague in any monastery or church cemetery in Moscow. The Muscovites were told to bury the dead instead only in the churches assigned to them according to their residential districts. Six "special churches" outside the city limits were designated for this purpose. One of them was at Vagankovo near Presnya (present-day Presnensky District); the dead from the first, third, and half of the fifth district of Moscow were to be sent there for burials.

=== Soviet era ===
American political scientist William Taubman wrote that, during the Great Purge, alcohol-soused guards would execute weeping prisoners after the latter had dug their own graves in the cemetery.

== Notable burials ==
- Aleksandr Abdulov (1953–2008), actor
- Vasily Agapkin (1884–1964), musician, author of the song "Farewell of Slavianka"
- Boris Andreyev (1915–1982), actor
- Inga Artamonova (1936–1966), world speed-skating champion
- Grigori Chukhrai (1921–2001), film director
- Vladimir Dal (1801–1872), lexicographer
- Reino Drockila (1870–1928), socialist and journalist
- Armen Dzhigarkhanyan (1935–2020), actor
- Anastasia Filatova (1920–2001), First Lady of Mongolia
- Sergei Grinkov (1967–1995), world & Olympic ice skating pairs champion
- Leonid Kharitonov (1930–1987), actor
- Otari Kvantrishvili (1948–1994), godfather of the Georgian mafia
- Nadezhda Lamanova (1861–1941), fashion and costume designer
- Lev Loktev (1908–1981), artillery designer
- Emil Loteanu (1936–2003), film director
- Egor Makovsky (1802–1886), accountant and artist
- Andrei Mironov (1941–1987), actor
- Maria Vladimirovna Mironova (1911–1997), actress
- Bulat Okudzhava (1924–1997), poet and singer-songwriter, writer
- Maria Olenina-d'Alheim (1869–1970), singer and noblewoman
- Lev Oshanin (1912–1996), poet, writer
- Vasili Oshchepkov (1892–1937), fighter
- Lyudmila Pakhomova (1946–1986), world & Olympic ice dancing pairs champion
- Mikhail Pugovkin (1923–2008), actor
- Prosh Proshian (1883–1918), Left Socialist-Revolutionary
- Alexei Savrasov (1830–1897), painter
- Gennady Shpalikov (1937–1974), poet, screenwriter
- David Shterenberg (1881–1948), artist
- Vitaly Solomin (1941–2002), actor
- Anatoly Solonitsyn (1934–1982), actor
- Nikolai Starostin (1902–1996), footballer
- Vasily Surikov (1848–1916), painter
- Yevgeny Svetlanov (1928–2002), conductor, composer, and pianist
- Igor Talkov (1956–1991), poet, singer-songwriter
- Anna Timiryova (1893–1975), poet
- Nika Turbina (1974–2002), poet
- Vasily Tropinin (1776–1857), painter
- Lev Vlassenko (1928–1996), pianist
- Vladimir Vysotsky (1938–1980), poet, singer-songwriter, actor
- Vasily Yan (1876–1954), writer
- Leonid Yengibarov (1935–1972), clown, mime, actor
- Yakov Rozval (1932–2015), engineer, inventor
- Avgust Yavich (1900–1979), writer, journalist, Russian Civil War and Second World War participant, Union of Soviet Writers
- Sergei Yesenin (1895–1925), poet, husband of Isadora Duncan
- Antonina Zubkova (1920–1950), WWII bomber pilot, Heroine of the Soviet Union
- Lev Gatovsky (1903–1997), Soviet economist and director of the Institute of Economics
