= Tengiz Menteshashvili =

- თენგიზ მენთეშაშვილი

Secretary of the Presidium of the Supreme Council of the Soviet Union
- In office 1982–1989
- Preceded by: Mikheil Giorgadze
- Succeeded by: none

Personal details
- Born: 26 March 1928 Tbilisi, Georgian SSR, Transcaucasian SFSR, USSR
- Died: 25 April 2016 (aged 88) Moscow, Russia
- Party: Communist Party of the Soviet Union
- Education: Georgian Polytechnic Institute named after S.M. Kirov
- Awards: Order of Honor; Order of the October Revolution; Order of the Red Banner of Labour; Order of the Badge of Honour; Honorary Citizen of Tbilisi

Tengiz Menteshashvili (Georgian: თენგიზ მენთეშაშვილი, Russian: Тенгиз Николаевич Ментешашвили; 26 March 1928—25 April 2016) was a Soviet politician who served as secretary of the Presidium of the Supreme Soviet of the USSR from 1982 until it was abolished in 1989.

== Biography ==
He was born on 26 March 1928 in Tbilisi. He graduated from the Georgian Polytechnic Institute named after S.M. Kirov in 1950 with a degree in mechanical engineering, and became a member of the Communist Party in 1952. Before holding political office positions he worked at the Rustavi Metallurgical Plant. He held many positions in the Communist Party in the Georgian SSR before becoming secretary of the Presidium of the Supreme Soviet of the USSR after the death of Mikheil Giorgadze.

He was an honorary member of the Russian Academy of Arts. He died in Moscow on 25 April 2016, but was buried in his homeland.
