= Yakov Rozval =

Soviet-Russian engineer

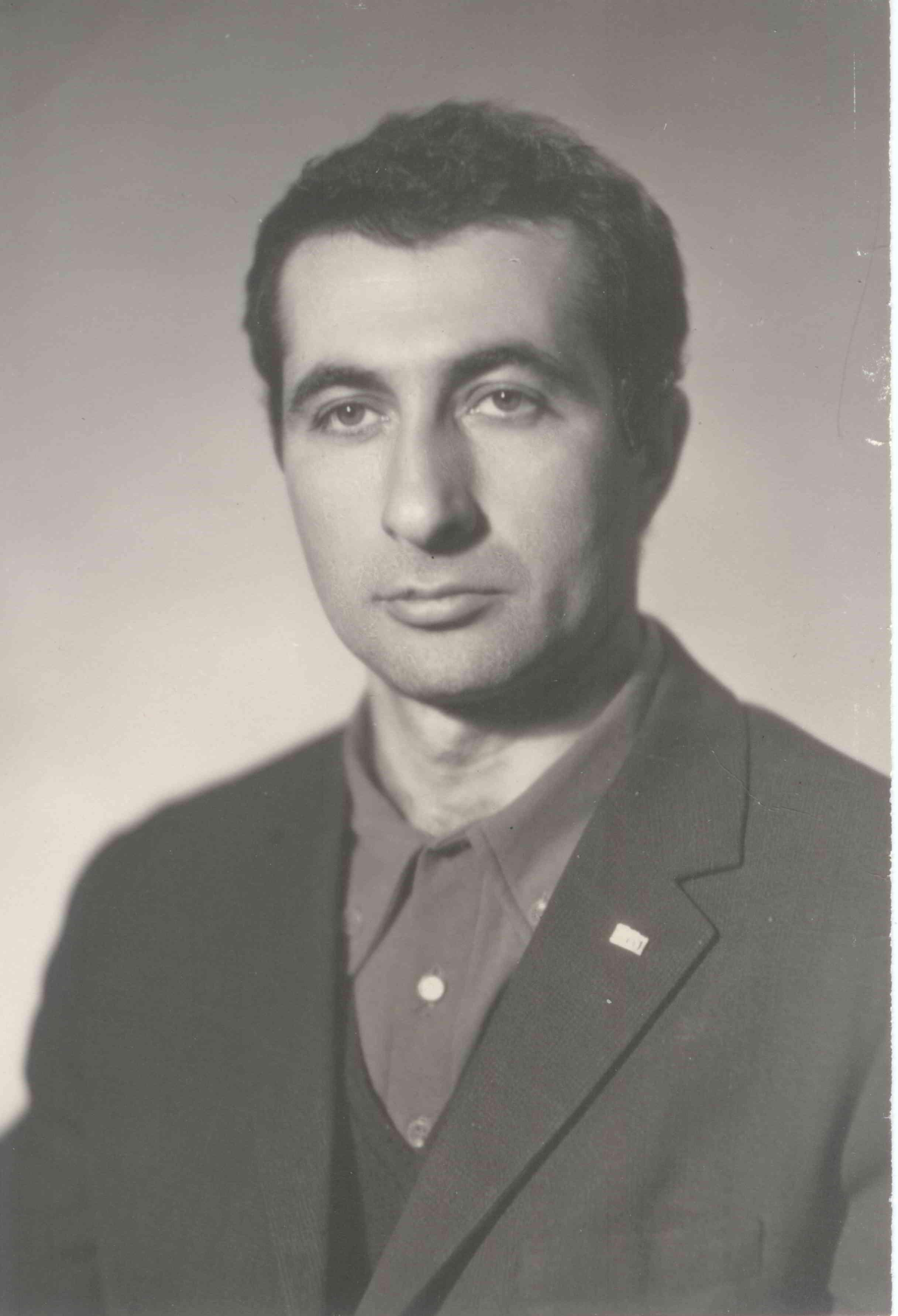
- Born: 21 December 1932; Odessa
- Died: 26 July 2015 (aged 82); Moscow

Rozval Yakov Borisovich (1932–2015) – Soviet, and subsequently, Russian engineer, was chief designer of the Soviet-wide Scientific Research Institute of TV and radio broadcasting, Honored Inventor of the RSFSR, and honorary radioman.

== Biography ==
=== Early life ===
Rozval Yakov Borisovich was born 21 December 1932 in Odessa in a wealthy Jewish family.

In those years, the country was suffering from famine, political repression and many were sent to jail on suspicion of espionage. His father, Boris Semenovich, as chief engineer at the plant, did not escape this fate, and in 1937 was sent to the Gulag.

After the Gulag, and until his death in 1963 Boris Semenovich worked at closed military factory ("Sharashka").

In 1950 the Jacob Rozval graduated 10 classes of secondary school with a gold medal and entered the Moscow State University of Geodesy and Cartography. He could not attend other institutions because his father was not fully rehabilitated.

=== Career ===
After graduation, he was sent to the Far East as an engineer-surveyor. For around 5 years he worked in different cities.

In 1963 his father was rehabilitated, and Jacob is admitted in Moscow Power Engineering Institute, majoring in "Industrial Electronics". From 1963 he worked in the Sovietwide Scientific Research Institute of Television and Radio Broadcasting (VNIITR) as an engineer.

In collaboration with V.A. Petropavlovskii developed laboratory model of the first Soviet colour television camera.

After 10 years of work he was appointed as the head constructor of this Institute. During this time he created most of his inventions.

=== Retirement and death ===
J.B. Rozval retired from his post as chief designer in 2012, at the age of eighty. Yakov Borisovich died on 26 July 2015 from cancer. His remains were buried at the Vagankovo Cemetery.

== Inventions and Patents ==
Yakov Borisovich Rozval – the author of many outstanding inventions, including the first Soviet broadcasting color camera as well as many others. A total of about 50 inventions and patents. Including:

- Colour broadcasting TV camera
- Device for realignment of colour-separated signals
- Magnetically sensitive device
- Device for X-ray fluorescence analysis
- Astronomical coordinates corrector for aircraft

== Awards and distinctions ==
- Honored Inventor of the RSFSR
- Honorary radioman
- Excellence in TV and Radio award
- Medal – "Veteran of Labour"
- Bronze Medal VDNKh
- Medal – "300 Years of Navy"
- Medal – "In memory of the 850 anniversary of Moscow"
