= Reino Drockila =

Finnish politician and journalist (1870–1928)

Reino Drockila (1870 - 26 October 1928) was a prominent Finnish Socialist and journalist. He was the co-editor of Lovisa Notisblad and chief editor of Arbetaren. He was considered to be a moderate social democrat and helped to start Oikeus, a newspaper which criticized the acceptance by movement leaders of violent struggle. In 1899, he helped found the Finnish Labour Party. He attended the Sixth Scandinavian Workers' Congress in Copenhagen in 1901, which was the first time Finland had participated in this event, During the Finnish Civil War, he fled to the Russian SFSR. He lived in Moscow, where he was arrested, accused of espionage, sentenced to death, and executed on 26 October 1928. He was buried in Vagankovo Cemetery. He was posthumously rehabilitated in 1993.
