= Richard Kosolapov =

Soviet philosopher and political figure (1930–2020)

Richard Ivanovich Kosolapov (Russian: Ричард Иванович Косолапов; 25 March 1930 – 15 November 2020) was a Soviet and Russian social philosopher, political figure, journalist, and author. A specialist in the Marxist–Leninist theory of socialism, he served as editor-in-chief of Kommunist, the chief theoretical journal of the Communist Party of the Soviet Union (CPSU), from 1976 to 1986. In that capacity he was twice elected a full member of the CPSU Central Committee, at the 25th (1976) and 26th (1981) congresses. He also served as a deputy to the Supreme Soviet of the Soviet Union, to which he was elected in 1979 and 1984.

Kosolapov was a major contributor to the theoretical elaboration of the concept of "developed socialism," the ideological framework that defined the Brezhnev era. His books Socialism: Questions of Theory (1975; 2nd ed. 1979) and Developed Socialism: Theory and Practice (1982) were standard reference works in Soviet political philosophy. Following Mikhail Gorbachev's rise to power and the onset of perestroika, Kosolapov was removed from his editorship at Kommunist and not re-elected to the Central Committee at the 27th Congress in 1986. He returned to Moscow State University, where he held academic positions until 2015.

== Early life and education ==
Kosolapov was born on 25 March 1930 in Novonikolayevsky in the Volga region, in what is now Volgograd Oblast. He enrolled at the Faculty of Philosophy of Moscow State University (MSU), from which he graduated in 1955. After graduating, he worked in the Bryansk Oblast committee of the Komsomol (Communist Youth League) from 1955 to 1958, and then briefly at the Armavir Pedagogical Institute (1958–1959). He subsequently entered graduate studies at MSU, earning his Candidate of Sciences degree in philosophical sciences in 1962. He was awarded the higher Doctor of Sciences degree in philosophical sciences in 1971.

== Academic and party career ==
=== Teaching and early party work (1961–1974) ===
Kosolapov taught at MSU's Faculty of Philosophy from 1961 to 1964. He joined the CPSU in 1957. In 1966, he moved to the Department for Agitation and Propaganda of the CPSU Central Committee, where he rose over the following eight years to the rank of deputy head of the department. In 1974, he received the academic title of professor.

=== Pravda and Kommunist (1974–1986) ===
In 1974, Kosolapov was appointed first deputy chief editor of Pravda, the official newspaper of the CPSU. Two years later, in 1976, he was elevated to editor-in-chief Kommunist, the party’s principal journal of political theory and ideology, succeeding Viktor Afanasyev. He held this position for a decade, until 1986, when he was succeeded by Ivan Frolov.

As editor-in-chief of Kommunist, Kosolapov occupied a position at the nexus of Soviet ideological production and policy deliberation. According to a 1982 profile in The Christian Science Monitor, he sometimes attended sessions of the CPSU Central Committee Secretariat; when he did not attend, officials said he was among those fully briefed on high-level discussions and decisions. The Monitor's Moscow correspondent described Kosolapov as occupying a position between foreign policy specialists such as Georgi Arbatov and more domestically oriented figures such as Pravda editor Viktor Afanasyev, and characterised him as equally engaged on foreign and domestic issues.

During his tenure at Kommunist, Kosolapov was elected a full member of the CPSU Central Committee at the party’s 25th Congress (1976) and 26th Congress (1981). He was also twice elected a deputy to the Supreme Soviet of the Soviet Union—in 1979 and 1984.

=== Removal under Gorbachev (1986) ===
After Mikhail Gorbachev became General Secretary in 1985, a broad reshuffling of party cadres associated with the Brezhnev era took place. At the 27th Party Congress in February–March 1986, Kosolapov was not re-elected to the Central Committee, and he was replaced as editor of Kommunist by the philosopher Ivan Frolov, who was closer to Gorbachev's reformist programme. Kosolapov’s departure from the journal was part of a wider pattern at the Congress, in which several Brezhnev-era appointees were removed from leading positions in party media and ideological institutions.

=== Return to Moscow State University (1986–2015) ===
Following his removal from Kommunist, Kosolapov returned to Moscow State University. He served as acting dean of the Faculty of Philosophy from 1986 to 1987. He then became a professor in the Department of Historical Materialism (1987–1991). After the dissolution of the Soviet Union in 1991, the department was reorganised, and Kosolapov continued as a senior researcher in the Department of Social Philosophy and Philosophy of History, a position he held until 2015.

== Theoretical work ==
=== Developed socialism ===
Kosolapov's principal scholarly contribution lay in the theoretical elaboration of developed socialism (Russian: развитой социализм), the concept that served as the central ideological framework of the Brezhnev period. The doctrine held that the Soviet Union had reached a qualitatively new, mature stage of socialist development—distinct from the Khrushchev-era claim that a direct transition to communism was imminent—and that this stage required prolonged consolidation and perfection.

Kosolapov’s book Socialism: Questions of Theory (first published in Russian in 1975; English translation 1979) provided a systematic exposition of the concept, arguing that developed socialism represented an "organic whole" in which social, economic, and cultural subsystems achieved a new level of integration. His later collective work, ‘‘Developed Socialism: Theory and Practice" (1982), served as a comprehensive handbook on the subject.

Kosolapov also advanced a distinctive thesis regarding class convergence under socialism. He argued that the rapprochement of social classes during the developed-socialism stage could reach a level sufficient to raise the prospect of a classless society within socialism itself. This position carried implications for the Marxist–Leninist theory of the socialist state, and it did not gain wide support among his colleagues in official philosophy.

Within the broader Soviet intellectual landscape of the early 1980s, Kosolapov was regarded as representing the orthodox Marxist position, in contrast to reformist thinkers such as Anatoliy Butenko and Alexander Tsipko. Where reformers emphasised the growth of individual autonomy and consumption, Kosolapov's writings drew on Marx's conception of labour as the essential attribute of humanity and foregrounded the collective dimensions of social development.

=== Contradictions under socialism ===
In a 1984 article in Pravda titled Socialism and Contradictions, Kosolapov addressed the question of whether contradictions could exist within a socialist system—a topic of renewed debate during the final years of the Brezhnev leadership and the brief tenures of Yuri Andropov and Konstantin Chernenko. This article was part of a broader pre-perestroika ferment among Soviet theorists over the nature and pace of socialist development. After his removal from Kommunist, Kosolapov engaged in a published exchange with Butenko in the journal Problems of Philosophy (No. 12, 1987), reflecting the continuing tensions between orthodox and reformist interpretations of socialist theory.

== Post-Soviet political activity ==
After the dissolution of the Soviet Union in 1991, Kosolapov remained politically active within the communist movement. He became a member of the Communist Party of the Russian Federation (CPRF). He was a member of the Central Committee of the Communist Party of the Russian Federation.

== Awards and honours ==
Kosolapov received several state awards from the Soviet government:

- Order of the Red Banner of Labour (1971)
- Order of the October Revolution (1980)
- Order of Lenin (1984)

== Selected publications ==
Kosolapov authored or edited numerous works on Marxist–Leninist theory and the philosophy of socialism. Major titles include:

- Communism and Freedom (Russian: Коммунизм и свобода), Moscow, 1970
- Problems of Socialist Theory (Russian: Проблемы социалистической теории), Moscow, 1974
- Socialism: Questions of Theory (Russian: Социализм. К вопросам теории), Moscow, 1975; 2nd ed. 1979; English translation: Moscow: Progress Publishers, 1979
- Developed Socialism: Theory and Practice (Russian: Развитой социализм: теория и практика), Moscow: Politizdat, 1982 (head of author collective)

== Personal life and death ==
Kosolapov died on 15 November 2020 in Moscow, at the age of 90. His death was announced by the Communist Party of the Russian Federation.

Media offices
Preceded by Viktor Afanasyev	Editor-in-Chief of ‘’Kommunist"; 1976–1986	Succeeded by Ivan Frolov
