= Pavel Anisimov (politician) =

Russian politician (1947–2024)

- Павел Анисимов

Member of the Federation Council of Russia
- In office December 1997 – 25 December 2001
- Preceded by: Valery Borodaev
- Succeeded by: Gennady Gorbunov

Personal details
- Born: Pavel Petrovich Anisimov; 12 August 1947 Kharabali, Astrakhan Oblast, Russian SFSR, USSR
- Died: 5 November 2024 (aged 77)
- Education: Astrakhan State Pedagogical Institute

Pavel Anisimov (Russian: Павел Петрович Анисимов; 12 August 1947 – 5 November 2024) was a Russian politician. He served in the Federation Council from 1997 to 2001.

Anisimov died on 5 November 2024, at the age of 77.
