= Aleksei Rumyantsev =

Soviet economist, sociologist and academic

- Born: 16 February 1905; Mintsovo village, Galichsky Uyezd, Kostroma Governorate, Russian Empire
- Died: 1 December 1993 (aged 88); Moscow, Russia
- Resting place: Troyekurovskoye Cemetery, Moscow
- Education: Kharkiv Institute of National Economy
- Scientific career
- Fields: Political economy, sociology
- Workplaces: USSR Academy of Sciences
- Academic advisors: Konstantin Ostrovityanov

Aleksei Matveyevich Rumyantsev (Russian: Алексей Матвеевич Румянцев; 16 February 1905 – 1 December 1993) was a Soviet economist, sociologist and academic.

== Biography ==
Rumyantsev was born into a poor peasant family and worked as a laborer. In 1923 he entered the Kharkiv Institute of National Economy. At the same time, in 1925–1927 he worked in the staff of the People's Commissariat of Agriculture of the Ukrainian SSR. In 1926 he graduated from the Kharkiv Institute of National Economy.

He served in the Red Army for a short period and from 1928 to 1929 he worked in the staff of the People's Commissariat of Agriculture of the Ukrainian SSR, and in 1929–1930 from the staff of the People's Commissariat of Justice of the Ukrainian SSR, where he became an associate of Nikita Khrushchev.

From 1930 to 1933 he studied at the graduate school of the Research Institute of Economics and Organization of Industry and at the same time taught at the Kharkiv Institute of Engineering and Economics. From 1933 to 1936 he was a professor at Kharkiv State University. He defended his dissertation "The emergence of private ownership of movable property" in 1940 at the Institute of Economics of the Academy of Sciences.

Rumyantsev joined the Communist Party in 1940.

From 1941 to 1943 he was the head of the Marxism–Leninism Department of the Tajik Agricultural Institute. From 1943 he worked in the Kharkiv region: lecturer of the Kharkiv regional committee of the Communist Party of Ukraine and was director of party courses at the Central Committee of the CPU and deputy head of the propaganda and agitation department of the Kharkiv regional committee of the CP (b) U.

From 1946 to 1949 he was secretary of the Kharkiv Regional Committee for Propaganda. From 1949 to 1950 he was the head of the Department of Political Economy at the Kharkiv Polytechnic Institute. From 1950 to 1952 he was the director of the Institute of Economics of the Ukrainian Academy of Sciences in Kyiv. From 1951 to 1952 he was chairman of the Bureau of the Department of Social Sciences of the Ukrainian Academy of Sciences.

From July 1952 he worked in Moscow. From July 1952 to March 1953 he was head of the Department of Economic and Historical Sciences and Higher Educational Institutions of the CPSU (B), member and chairman of the Standing Commission on Ideological Issues under the CPSU Central Committee Presidium. From March 1953 to 1955 he was head of the department of science and culture of the Central Committee of the CPSU.

From 1955 to 1958 he was the editor-in-chief of the Kommunist magazine. Rumyantsev was one of the first supporters of the works of Evsei Liberman which eventually led to the Soviet economic reforms. From 1958 to 1964 he was the editor-in-chief of the journal Problems of Peace and Socialism. He was the editor of the Economic Encyclopedia "Political Economy". From 1964 to 1965 Rumyantsev was the editor-in-chief of the Pravda newspaper.

From 1965 to 1967 he was an academician-secretary of the economics department of the Academy of Sciences of the Soviet Union.

From May 17, 1967, to May 28, 1971, Rumyantsev was Vice President of the Academy of Sciences of the Soviet Union, responsible for social sciences. From 1968 to 1972, he was director of the Institute of Specific Social Research of the Academy of Sciences (ICSD), the first sociological institute in the USSR, from which he was dismissed along with other leading scholars in 1972 for his "liberal views". During this time he was also one of the directors of the European (Vienna) Center for the Coordination of Research in the Social Sciences. After his dismissal from the ICSD, he headed the Scientific Council of the Academy of Sciences "History of the National Economy and Socio-Economic Doctrines." From August 1971 he was a member of the Presidium of the Soviet Academy of Sciences.

He was one of the academicians of the Academy of Sciences, who in 1973 signed a letter from scientists to the Pravda newspaper condemning "the behavior of Academician Andrey Sakharov".

Rumyantsev was a member of the Central Committee of the CPSU from 1952 to 1976 and a Deputy of the Supreme Soviet of the Soviet Union from 1954 to 1962.

Aleksei Rumyantsev died on December 1, 1993, he was buried in Moscow, at the Troyekurovskoye Cemetery.

== See also ==
- List of Heroes of the Russian Federation
