= Kommunist =

Theoretical organ of the Communist Party of the Soviet Union

- First issue of the journal
- Discipline: Political theory
- Language: Russian

Publication details
- Former name: Bolshevik
- History: 1924–1991
- Frequency: Bi-weekly

Standard abbreviations
- ISO 4: Kommunist

Kommunist (Russian: Коммунист), named Bolshevik (Большевик) until 1952, was a Soviet journal. The journal was started in 1924. The founders were Nikolai Bukharin, Georgy Pyatakov, and Yevgenia Bosch. It was the official theoretical and political organ of the Central Committee of the Communist Party of the Soviet Union.

== History ==
On January 3, 1924, the newspaper Pravda announced the release of the "political and economic" magazine of the Central Committee of the Russian Communist Party (b) as a weekly.

The journal started to publish from April 1924. The frequency was once every two weeks. The journal covered issues of Marxist-Leninist theory, the history of the international communist movement and the building of a communist society in the USSR. Articles were published on philosophy, economics, literature and art.

After the 19th Party Congress, at which the All-Union Communist Party (b) was renamed to the Communist Party of the Soviet Union, in November 1952, the journal was renamed the theoretical and political journal Kommunist, an organ of the Central Committee of the CPSU. From that time, the magazine began to appear every twenty days with a circulation of 600,000 copies.

The magazine was renamed Svobodnaia Mysl (or Svobodnaya Mysl) at the beginning of the 1990s. It is still published, on a monthly basis. The magazine's headquarters are in Moscow. Vladislav L. Inozemtsev is the editor-in-chief of the magazine.

In 2002 the circulation of Svobodnaya Mysl was 4,600 copies. While under the name Kommunist, the magazine circulated many more copies with 700,000 copies in 1957, 687,000 copies in 1965, and 707,000 copies in 1966.

== Repudiation of "End of Civilization" ==
In a 1955 issue in response to the ‘end of civilization’ argument, the magazine depicts the widespread belief of an inevitable end of global civilization with a war between the socialists and capitalists as merely a method of "poison[ing] the minds of the peoples with fatalism" and promoting a strong sense of pessimism. The propagation of this notion considered to be a means to discourage the rigour in socialists to fight by assuring an inevitable end of the world. This issue also implicitly describes the socialist camp as the "emergent and developing new," and the capitalist camp as the "dying and decomposing old." The magazine reveals an early understanding of the mutually-assured destruction doctrine in the Soviet media and also lashes out against American Imperialism. This same issue describes socialist countries as democratic and describes the unity of the socialist camp as "unshakeable" due to their working people agreeing on all matters of importance.

In 1958, a department of industry and transport was created to advise the editorial board from a professional standpoint on matters involving those two fields.

== Polemics against Mao and the People's Republic of China ==
In 1969, numerous editions of the magazine spoke out against Maoism and the People's Republic of China. The magazine critiqued Mao Zedong for using his ideology to justify the "self-seeking aims" of the "Mao Zedong group". Maoism is depicted as "hostile to Marxism," and the objectives in the international arena of the Mao Zedong group are depicted as chauvinistic and hegemonic. Issue no.7 (1969) extensively discussed the efforts made by the "Mao Zedong group" to resist Soviet attempts to strengthen their friendship and trade. Conclusively, Mao’s regime is depicted in the 1969 issues as prioritizing nationalism and drifting away from Marxism and Leninism. Issue no.5 (1969) also made accusations against Albania and West Germany for colluding with Mao Zedong and his associates in establishing a beachhead in Europe for potential military activity, including the potential placement of nuclear missiles in Albania. This issue also cites a relaxation in trade sanctions from capitalist states as grounds for their claims alongside the growth in trade with West Germany.

== Editors-in-Chief ==
- Nikolai Bukharin (1924–1929)
- Vilhelm Knorin (1930–1934)
- Aleksei Stetsky (1934–1938)
- Konstantin Kuzakov (1940–1945)
- Pyotr Fedoseev (1945–1949)
- Sergey Abalin (1949–1952)
- Dmitry I. Chesnokov (1952–1953)
- Aleksei Rumyantsev (1954–1958)
- Fyodor Konstantinov (1958–1962)
- Vasily Stepanov (1962–1965)
- Anatoly Egorov (1965–1974)
- Viktor G. Afanasiev (1974–1976)
- Richard Kosolapov (1976–1986)
- Ivan Frolov (1986–1987)
- Nail Bikkenin (1987–1991)
