= Institute of Economics of the Russian Academy of Sciences =

Russian institution

Coordinates: 55°40′35″N 37°34′18″E

Institute of Economics of RAS
- Институт экономики Российской академии наук (ИЭ РАН)
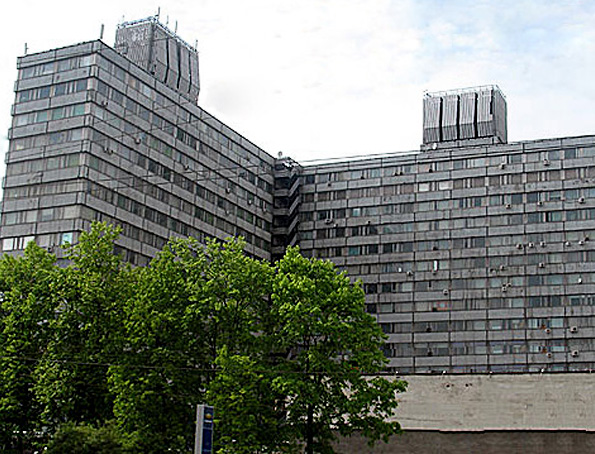
- Established: 1930
- Field of research: Economics
- Director: M. Y. Golovnin
- Location: Moscow, Russia
- Affiliations: Russian Academy of Sciences
- Website: http://www.inecon.org/

The Institute of Economics (Russian: Институ́т эконо́мики) is a research institution within the Russian Academy of Sciences. Since 2011, the official name of the institution has been the Federal State Budgetary Institution of Economics of the Russian Academy of Sciences (Russian: Федеральное государственное бюджетное учреждение науки Институт экономики Российской академии наук).

== History ==
The Institute of Economics was originally established in 1922 under the Communist Academy. On 8 July 1930, the Institute of Economics of the Russian Association of Scientific Research Institutes of Social Sciences (RANION) was merged the Institute of Economics of the Communist Academy. On August 10, 1931, the Institute of Economics of the Communist Academy was merged with the Economic Institute of Red Professors. On February 15, 1936, the Economic and Agrarian Institutes of the Communist Academy were reorganized into a single Institute of Economics, with its inclusion in the system of the Academy of Sciences of the Soviet Union. On October 4, 1947, the Institute of World Economy and World Politics and the Institute of Economics were merged into the Institute of Economics in the system of the Academy of Sciences of the Soviet Union.

Under the directorship of Lev Gatovsky (1965-1971), the Institute of Economics played a pivotal role in the development and implementation of economic reforms in the Soviet Union. In 2005, the Institute of Economics and the Institute of International Economic and Political Research (IMEPS RAS, formerly the Institute of Economics of the World Socialist System of the Academy of Sciences of the USSR) were merged, the latter entered the structure of the Institute of Economics as a branch called the Department of International Economic and Political Research (OMEPI).

== Structure ==
The Institute includes these research centers:

- Center for Political and Economic Research;
- Center for Investment and Innovation; Center for Macroeconomic Strategy;
- Center for Labor Market and Social Processes Research; Center for Social and Economic Problems of Federalism; Center for Institutional and Microeconomic Research;
- Center for Financial and Banking Research; Information Center.

The structure of OMEPI includes the Center for Foreign Economic Research. The Institute publishes the journal Economic Questions.

== Directors ==
Years	Director
1930–1936	Vladimir P. Milyutin
1936–1940	acad. Maximilian A. Saveliev
1940–1941	Dan. B. L. Markus
1945–1947	Dan. P. A. Khromov
1947–1953	acad. K. V. Ostrovityanov
1953–1956	Corresponding Member USSR Academy of Sciences V.P. Dyachenko
1956–1958	Ph.D. I. D. Laptev
1959–1965	Corresponding Member RAS K. N. Plotnikov
1965–1971	Corresponding Member RAS Lev. M. Gatovsky
1971–1986	Corresponding Member RAS Evgeny I. Kapustin
1986–2005	acad. Leonid I. Abalkin
2005–2015	Corresponding Member RAS Ruslan S. Grinberg
2015	Corresponding Member RAS M. Yu. Golovnin (acting)
2016–2021	Dan. E. B. Lenchuk
Since 2021	Corresponding Member RAS M. Yu. Golovnin
