= Voprosy Ekonomiki =

- Discipline: Economics
- Language: Russian
- Edited by: Andrey Kotkovsky

Publication details
- Former name: Problems of Economics
- History: 1929–present
- Publisher: Institute of Economics of RAS (Soviet Union/Russia)
- Frequency: Monthly

Standard abbreviations
- ISO 4: Vopr. Ekon.

Indexing
- ISSN: 0042-8736

Voprosy Ekonomiki (Russian: Вопросы экономики, translation: Economic Questions) is a Russian theoretical and peer-reviewed academic journal for economic studies. It is published monthly by the Institute of Economics of the Russian Academy of Sciences. It was founded during the Soviet era as Problems of Economics.

The main sections of the journal are: economic theory; professional analysis of the course of economic transformations in Russia; monetary, investment and structural policy; social sphere; regional economy; analytical and statistical information on the state of various industries and market sectors; enterprise economics, problems of ownership, corporate governance, small business; world economy; economic history, etc.

The journal was awarded the Order of the Red Banner of Labor (1979). The editorial office of the journal is located in Moscow.
