= Viktor Afanasyev (politician) =

- Виктор Афанасьев
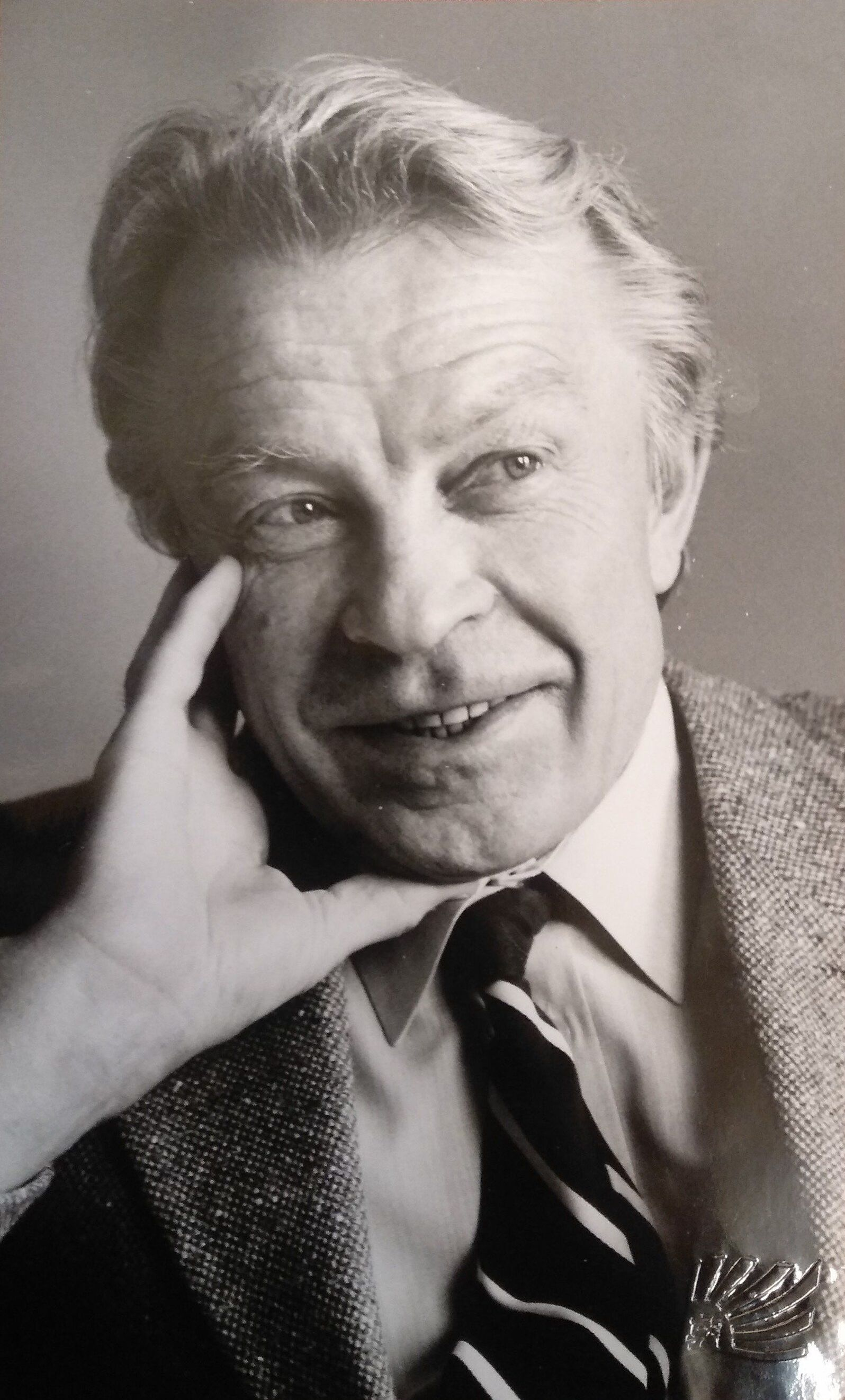
- Afanasyev in 1980

Editor-in-Chief of Pravda
- In office 1976–1989
- Preceded by: Mikhail Zimyanin
- Succeeded by: Ivan Frolov

Personal details
- Born: 18 November 1922 Aktanysh, Russian SFSR
- Died: 10 April 1994 (aged 71) Moscow, Russia
- Resting place: Kuntsevo Cemetery
- Education: Transbaikal State Humanitarian and Pedagogical University; State University of Education

Viktor Grigoryevich Afanasyev (Russian: Ви́ктор Григо́рьевич Афана́сьев; 18 November 1922 – 10 April 1994) was a Soviet and Russian public figure, journalist and professor of philosophy who is remembered for his work as a philosophy academic, politician, and newspaper editor. Afanasyev was editor-in-chief (1974-1975) of the journal Kommunist and deputy editor (1968–1974) and editor-in-chief (1976–1989) of Pravda.

Moderately critical of Soviet leader Mikhail Gorbachev and still more so as a rising independent politician Boris Yeltsin in his capacity as editor, Afanasyev was dismissed from his high position at Pravda after a period of falling circulation and a negative official reaction to the newspaper's highlighting Boris Yeltsin's troubles with alcohol during the Gorbachev administration in 1989 and spent the remaining half-decade of his life working for the national Academy of Sciences in Moscow.

== Biography ==
=== Early life ===
Born in 1922 in Aktanysh in the Tatar ASSR (now Russia's Republic of Tatarstan) in 1922, Afanasyev joined the Red Army in 1940 and served with the Soviet paratroopers in the 1940s and World War II, remaining in the armed forces until 1953. He was awarded his first university degree for his independent completion of the required curriculum of the Chita Pedagogical Institute in Chita, Zabaykalsky Krai while still serving in the Soviet military. Afanasyev joined the All-Union Communist Party (b) in 1943.

=== Academic and public figure ===
Afanasyev first became a professional instructor upon leaving the Soviet Army in 1953 and continued concentrate his professional interest on teaching and administrative appointments in academia into the 1960s and 1970s. His appointments during this period included teaching as an instructor in Soviet Marxist theory at the Chelyabninsk Pedogagical Institute and a position with the philosophical branch of the Academy of Social Sciences of the Central Committee of the Communist Party of the Soviet Union. He authored a range of papers and books on philosophical subjects in the 1960s and 1970s. His dissertation for a Doktor nauk degree, a work concerned with issues pertinent to both philosophy and biology on a theoretical level, was accepted in 1964.

Afanasyev was elected a corresponding member of the Academy of Sciences of the Soviet Union in 1972 and advanced to become a full member in 1981. He was elected to the Central Committee of the Communist Party of the Soviet Union in 1976.

Afanasyev became deputy editor of Pravda (a newspaper given the prestige of serving as the "official voice of the Communist Party of the Soviet Union") in 1968. He remained as deputy editor with Pravda until joining the Kommunist (regarded as the theoretical and political organ of the Central Committee of the Communist Party of the Soviet Union) for a brief period as chief editor in 1974-1975. He returned to become chief editor of Pravda in 1975, remaining with the newspaper in the same capacity until 1989.

Afanasyev was a Deputy (representative) of the Supreme Soviet of the Russian Soviet Federative Socialist Republic, serving from 1974 to 1979. He was twice elected as a Deputy of the Supreme Soviet of the Soviet Union, serving from 1979 to 1989.

==== As Pravda editor ====
Afansyev's period as editor of Pravda saw a lukewarm response to Mikhail Gorbachev's changes in the late 1980s, vacillating between support for Gorbachev's policies and for those of his opponents in the leading circles of the party, while Pravda's readership witnessed a precipitous decline, dropping by around half in the course of Gorbachev's first four years at the helm of the Soviet Union.

A TIME story of October 1989 also recalled that Afanasyev "suffered a nasty embarrassment last month, when Pravda reprinted a lurid dispatch from an Italian newspaper claiming that reformist Supreme Soviet Deputy Boris Yeltsin boozed and shopped his way through a tour of the U.S." The report noted that the newspaper was pressured into publishing an apology, although recorded video subsequently broadcast over the Soviet television "appeared to show Yeltsin at least mildly intoxicated."

Afanasyev was dismissed in favor of Gorbachev ally Ivan Frolov under the guise of requesting a "transfer to scientific work" during the subsequent fallout. He spent the remaining half-decade of his life absorbed in work for the Academy of Sciences of the Union of Soviet Socialist Republics (the Russian Academy of Sciences since 1991).

He died in Moscow in 1994 and was buried at the Kuntsevo Cemetery.

== Recognition ==
Afanasyev was well-recognized for his service by the Soviet state: among the honors awarded him were two Orders of the October Revolution. He was a laureate of the USSR State Prize in 1983.

He was also bestowed the following awards:

- Order of Lenin
- Order of the Patriotic War
- Order of the Red Banner of Labour
- Order of the Red Star
- Medal "For Courage"
- Jubilee Medal "In Commemoration of the 100th Anniversary of the Birth of Vladimir Ilyich Lenin"
- Medal "For the Victory over Germany in the Great Patriotic War 1941–1945"
- Jubilee Medal "Twenty Years of Victory in the Great Patriotic War 1941–1945"
- Jubilee Medal "Thirty Years of Victory in the Great Patriotic War 1941–1945"
- Jubilee Medal "Forty Years of Victory in the Great Patriotic War 1941–1945"
- Medal "For the Victory over Japan"
- Medal "Veteran of Labour"
- Jubilee Medal "30 Years of the Soviet Army and Navy"
- Jubilee Medal "50 Years of the Armed Forces of the USSR"
- Jubilee Medal "60 Years of the Armed Forces of the USSR"
- Jubilee Medal "70 Years of the Armed Forces of the USSR"

A thirty-six page work devoted to the achievements of Afanasyev's life was published by the Institute of Socio-Political Research of the Russian Academy of Sciences in 2002, in honor of what would have been Afanasyev's 80th birthday.

== Bibliography ==
1978: Social Information and the Regulation of Social Development, Progress Publishers (Moscow).

1987: Historical Materialism, International Publishers (New York), ISBN 0-7178-0637-5.
