= Alexandra Fominykh =

Russian farm worker

Alexandra Matveyevna Fominykh (Russian: Александра Матвеевна Фоминых; 1925 – 4 July 2004) was a Russian farm worker at the Belovsky state farm, Troitsky District, Altai Krai. She was a weigher in the warehouse, combine operator, recordkeeper, a pig farmer and finally as a forewoman of its pig farm. Fominykh was a delegate to four Congresses of the Communist Party of the Soviet Union, a member of the Central Auditing Commission of the Communist Party of the Soviet Union and a candidate member of the Central Committee of the Communist Party of the Soviet Union. She was a recipient of two Orders of Lenin, the Order of the Red Banner of Labour, the Order of the October Revolution and the title of Hero of Socialist Labour.

== Biography ==
Fominykh was born in the Siberian Krai (today Altai) in 1925 to a farmer's family. In 1941, she completed the 7th year of secondary school. Fominykh began her career that same year when she was employed by the Belovsky state farm, Troitsky District, Altai Krai. At first, she was a weigher in the warehouse, then worked as a combine operator, recordkeeper and as a pig farmer. Starting in July 1953, Fominykh was a forewoman at the pig farm of the Belovsky state farm. Each year, the Belovsky sow farm received 60,000 or more Large White and British Landrace piglets, which were fattened at the farm's other four pig farms and sold all over the Altai Krai. Fominykh's work, organisational skills, and professional experience laid the foundation for the entire team's consistently high production figures. Her brigade's livestock breeders frequently participated in the Exhibition of Achievements of National Economy (VDNKh) of the Soviet Union.

In 1961, Fominykh joined the Communist Party of the Soviet Union. She was elected as a delegate to the 23rd Congress of the Communist Party of the Soviet Union in 1966, the 24th Congress of the Communist Party of the Soviet Union in 1971, 25th Congress of the Communist Party of the Soviet Union in 1976 and 26th Congress of the Communist Party of the Soviet Union in 1981, served as a member of the Central Auditing Commission of the Communist Party of the Soviet Union between 1966 and 1971 and was a candidate member of the Central Committee of the Communist Party of the Soviet Union between 1971 and 1981. In her final years, Fominykh was resident in the district centre, the village of Zonalnoye. She died on 4 July 2004.

== Recognition ==
Fominykh was awarded the Order of the Red Banner of Labour on 7 March 1960 and was conferred the title of Hero of Socialist Labour, the Order of Lenin and the Hammer and Sickle gold medal by the Presidium of the Supreme Soviet of the Soviet Union on 22 March 1966. She was also presented with the Order of the October Revolution on 8 April 1971 and a second Order of Lenin on 6 September 1973.
