= Mikheil Giorgadze (politician) =

Politician (1912–1982)

- მიხეილ გიორგაძე

Secretary of the Presidium of the Supreme Council of the Soviet Union
- In office 1957–1982
- Preceded by: Alexander Gorkin
- Succeeded by: Tengiz Menteshashvili

Personal details
- Born: 12 March [O.S. 28 February] 1912 Zodi village, Kutaisi Governorate, Russian Empire
- Died: 23 November 1982 (aged 70) Moscow, Russian Soviet Federative Socialist Republic, Soviet Union
- Resting place: Novodevichy Cemetery
- Party: Communist Party of the Soviet Union
- Education: Moscow Institute of Agricultural Mechanization and Electrification
- Awards: Order of Lenin (2); Order of the Red Banner of Labour; Order of the Red Star

Mikheil Giorgadze (Georgian: მიხეილ გიორგაძე, Russian: Михаил Порфирьевич Георгадзе, romanized: Mikheil Porfirievich Giorgadze; 12 March [O.S. 28 February] 1912—23 November 1982) was a Georgian-Soviet politician who served as secretary of the Presidium of the Supreme Soviet of the USSR from 1957 to 1982.

== Biography ==
He was born in 1912 in Zodi village, located in present-day Chiatura district, Georgia. In 1941 he graduated from the Moscow Institute of Agricultural Mechanization and Electrification.

He served as the Deputy Minister of Agriculture of the Georgian SSR from 1953 to 1954. In 1954 he became at Minister of Agriculture of the Georgian SSR and First Deputy Chairman of the Council of Ministers of the Georgian SSR, which he held until 1956. From 1957 until the end of his life, he was Secretary of the Presidium of the Supreme Soviet of the USSR.

He died on 23 November 1982 and was buried in the Novodevichy Cemetery.

== Awards ==
He received two Order of Lenin (in 1972 and 1982), the Order of the Red Banner of Labor (in 1962), and Order of the Red Star (1945).
