= Philosophy in the Soviet Union =

Philosophy in the Soviet Union was officially confined to Marxist–Leninist thinking, which was theoretically the proclaimed basis of objective and ultimate philosophical truth. During the 1920s and 1930s, other tendencies of Russian thought were repressed (many philosophers emigrated, others were expelled). Joseph Stalin enacted a decree in 1931 identifying dialectical materialism with Marxism–Leninism, making it the official philosophy which would be enforced in all communist states and, through the Comintern, in most communist parties. Following the traditional use in the Second International, opponents would be labeled as "revisionists".

From the beginning of Bolshevik regime, the aim of official Soviet philosophy (which was taught as an obligatory subject for every course), was the theoretical justification of communist ideas. For this reason, "Sovietologists", among whom the most famous were Józef Maria Bocheński, professor of philosophy at the Pontifical University of Saint Thomas Aquinas and Gustav Wetter, have often claimed Soviet philosophy was close to nothing but dogma.

After the 1917 October Revolution, it was marked by both philosophical and political struggles, which call into question any monolithic reading. Evald Vasilevich Ilyenkov was one of the main philosophers of the 1960s, who revisited the 1920s debate between "mechanicists" and "dialecticians" in Leninist Dialectics and Metaphysics of Positivism (1979). During the 1960s and 1970s Western philosophies including analytical philosophy and logical positivism began to make a mark in Soviet thought.

== Philosophical and political struggles in the Soviet Union ==
Dialectical materialism was initially expounded by Karl Marx and Friedrich Engels; one of the early works on the subject is Engels's 1878 polemic Anti-Dühring. It was elaborated by Vladimir Lenin in Materialism and Empirio-criticism (1908) around three axes: the "materialist inversion" of Hegelian dialectics; the historicity of ethical principles ordered to class struggle; and the convergence of "laws of evolution" in physics (Helmholtz), biology (Darwin) and political economy (Marx). Lenin hence took position between a historicist Marxism (Labriola) and a determinist Marxism, close to what was later called "social Darwinism" (Kautsky). Lenin's most important philosophical rival was Alexander Bogdanov (1873–1928), who tried to synthesize Marxism with the philosophies of Ernst Mach, Wilhelm Ostwald, and Richard Avenarius (which were harshly criticized in Lenin's Materialism and Empirio-criticism). Bodganov wrote a treatise on "tectology" and was one of the founders of Proletkult after the First World War.

Following the 1917 October Revolution, Soviet philosophy divided itself between "dialecticians" (Deborin) and "mechanists" (Bukharin, who would detail Stalin's thesis upheld in 1924 concerning "socialism in one country", was not a "mechanist" per se, but was seen as an ally.) The mechanists (A.K. Timiryasev, Axelrod, Skvortsov-Stepanov etc.), came mostly from scientific backgrounds, claimed that Marxist philosophy found its basis in a causal explanation of nature. They upheld a positivist interpretation of Marxism which asserted that Marxist philosophy had to follow the natural sciences. Stepanov thus wrote an article flatly titled "The Dialectical Understanding of Nature is the Mechanistic Understanding". To the contrary, "dialecticians", whose background was Hegelian, insisted that dialectics could not be reduced to simple mechanism. Basing themselves mainly on Engels' Anti-Dühring and Dialectics of Nature, they maintained that the laws of dialectics could be found in nature. Taking support from the theory of relativity and quantum mechanics, they responded that the mechanists' conception of nature was too restricted and narrow. Deborin, who had been a student of Georgi Plekhanov, the "father of Russian Marxism", also disagreed with the mechanicists concerning the place of Baruch Spinoza. The latter maintained that he was an idealist metaphysician, while Deborin, following Plekhanov, saw Spinoza as a materialist and a dialectician. Mechanism was finally condemned as undermining dialectical materialism and for vulgar evolutionism at the 1929 meeting of the Second All-Union Conference of Marxist–Leninist Scientific Institutions. Two years later, Stalin settled by fiat the debate between the mechanist and the dialectician tendencies by issuing a decree which identified dialectical materialism as the philosophical basis of Marxism–Leninism. Henceforth, the possibilities for philosophical research independent of official dogmatics virtually vanished, while Lysenkoism was enforced in the scientific fields (in 1948, genetics were declared a "bourgeois pseudoscience"). However, this debate between "mechanists" and "dialecticians" would retain importance long after the 1920s.

Otherwise, David Riazanov was named director of the Marx–Engels Institute, which he had founded, in 1920. He then created the MEGA (Marx-Engels-Gesamt-Ausgabe), which was supposed to edit Marx and Engels' complete works. He also published other authors, such as Diderot, Feuerbach or Hegel. Riazanov was however excluded from any political functions in 1921 for defending trade unions' autonomy.

During the Fifth Comintern Congress, Grigory Zinoviev condemned for "revisionism" the works of Georg Lukács, History and Class Consciousness (1923) and of Karl Korsch, Marxism and Philosophy. History and Class Consciousness was disavowed by its author, who made his self-criticism for political reasons (he thought that, for a revolutionary, being part of the party was the priority). It became however a leading source of Western Marxism, starting with the Frankfurt School, and even influenced Heidegger's Sein und Zeit (1927). Lukács then went to Moscow in the beginnings of the 1930s where he would continue his philosophical studies, and returned to Hungary after World War II. He then took part in Imre Nagy's government in 1956, and was closely watched afterwards.

Lev Vygotsky's (1896–1934) studies in developmental psychology, which opposed themselves to Ivan Pavlov's works, would be expanded in the activity theory developed by Alexei Nikolaevich Leont'ev, Pyotr Zinchenko (a member of Kharkov School of Psychology), and Alexander Luria, a neuropsychologist who developed the first lie detector.

== After the 20th Congress of the CPSU ==
Nevertheless, the conditions for creative philosophical work began to emerge in the mid-1950s, after the 20th Congress of the CPSU in 1956, albeit only on the 'outskirts' of philosophy: the philosophy of the natural science (B. Kedrov, I. Frolov), theory of perception and gnoseology (P. Kopnin, V. Lektorsky, M. Mamardashvili, E. Ilyenkov), the history of philosophy (V. Asmus, A. Losev, I. Narski), ethics (O. Dobronitski), aesthetics (M. Kagan, L. Stolovitsh), logics (G. Shchedrovitsky, A. Zinovyev) and semiotics and system theories (J. Lotman, who set up the Sign Systems Studies journal, the oldest semiotics periodical; V. Sadovsky). The works of the young Marx, such as the Economic and Philosophical Manuscripts of 1844, which had been first published in 1932 but suppressed under Stalin because of its incomplete break with German Idealism, also started being discussed.

== Others ==
1) Vasily Nalimov (1910-1997) was interested mainly in the philosophy of probability and its biological, mathematical, and linguistic manifestations. He also studied the roles of gnosticism and mysticism in science. Nalimov is usually credited with proposing the concept of citation index.

2) The so-called "communist morality" was an important part of Soviet Union philosophy. According to Lenin and Stalin, morality should be subordinated to the ideology of proletarian revolution. Denying the validity of religion-based morality, they wrote: what is useful to us (the Soviet people) is moral, what is harmful to us is immoral. Morality is a weapon in class struggle. Party and Komsomol members were drilled to accept that position, and to act accordingly.

== Publications and propaganda ==
First All-Union Conference on the Problems of Medical Deontology (1970)

The USSR published voluminous materials to disseminate its philosophical ideals and justifications. These took the form of academic or professional journals or notes in the pattern of peer-reviewed material. For example, the book First All-Union Conference on the Problems of Medical Deontology challenges the idea of a medical deontology, or ethics based on moral rules, versus ethics based on utilitarian rules decided on the best outcome for the greatest number of people.

== Scholarly evaluations ==
According to Marxist philosopher Helena Sheehan, Stalin had a detrimental impact on the Soviet philosophical tradition with most Soviet sources considering his influence to have negatively affected the creative development of Soviet philosophy.

== See also ==
- Dialectical materialism
- Dialectical logic
- Fundamentals of Marxism–Leninism
- Historical Materialism
- Marxist sociology
- Marxist philosophy
- Russian philosophy
- Activity theory
- Western Marxism

== Sources ==
- Wetter, Gustav A. (1958). Dialectical Materialism: A Historical and Systematic Survey of Philosophy in the Soviet Union. American Political Science Association.
- Sommerville, John (1946). Soviet Philosophy: A Study of Theory and Practice. New York Philosophical Library.
- Bakhurst, David (1991). Consciousness and Revolution in Soviet Philosophy: From the Bolsheviks to Evald Ilyenkov. Cambridge University Press.
- V.A. Bazhanov. Philosophy in Post-Soviet Russia (1992 - 1997): Background, Present State, and Prospects // Studies in East European Thought, 1999, vol. 15, N 4, pp. 1–23.
