= Andrey Kuraev =

21st-century Russian Orthodox cleric and theologian

Protodeacon Andrey Kuraev
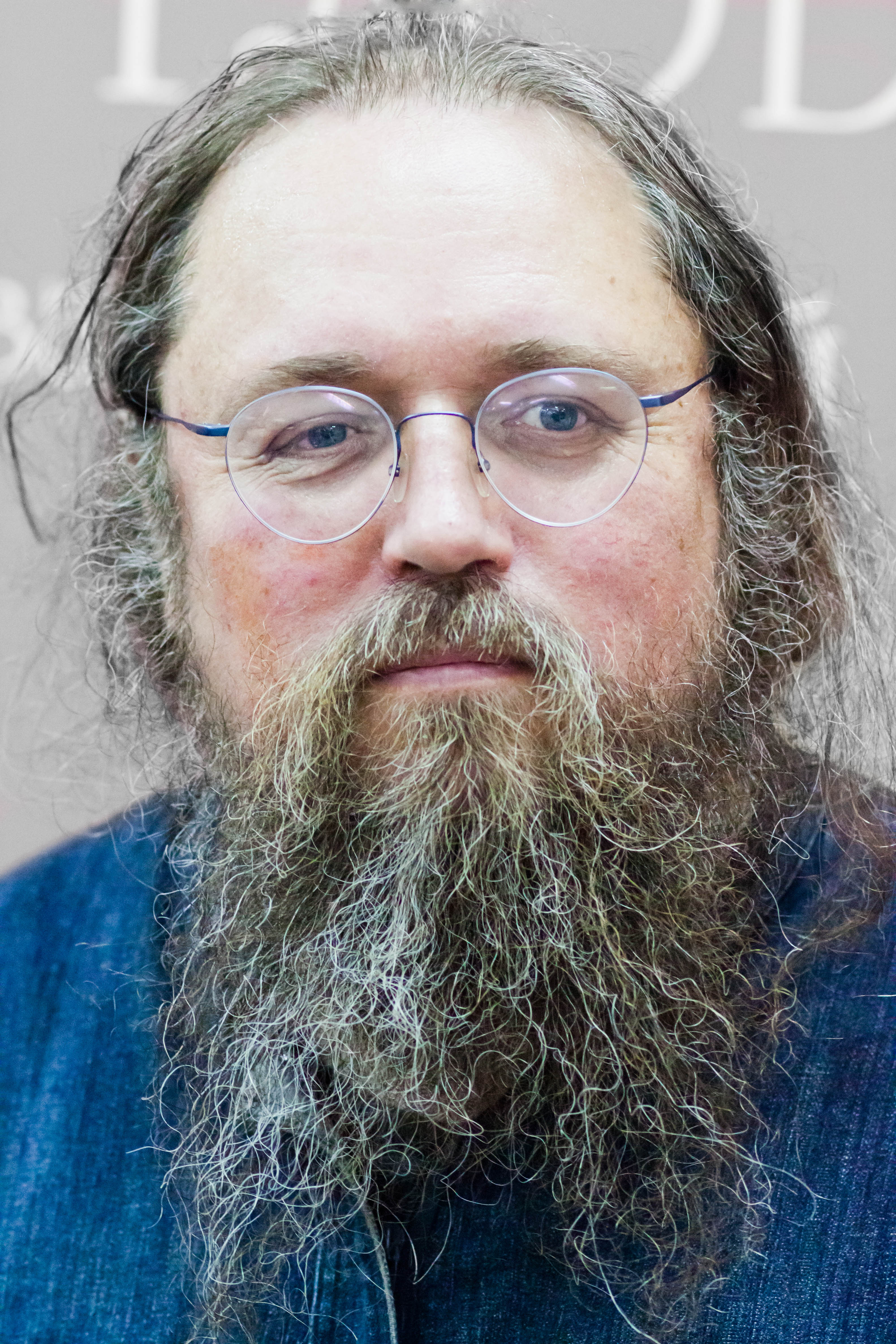
- Kuraev in 2017
- Native name: Андрей Кураев
- Church: Constantinople Orthodox Church
- See: Moscow
- Installed: 5 April 2009
- Term ended: Incumbent
- Other posts: Professor of theology; 1996 to 2013

Orders
- Rank: deacon

Personal details
- Born: Andrey Vyacheslavovich Kuraev (Андре́й Вячесла́вович Кура́ев); 15 February 1963 (age 63) Moscow, Soviet Union
- Profession: Cleric, theologian, professor, writer, blogger
- Education: Faculty of Philosophy of the Moscow State University (1979—1984, with honours); Moscow Theological Seminary (1985—1988); Faculty of Orthodox Theology of the University of Bucharest (1988—1990); Moscow Theological Academy (1992)
- Andrey Kuraev's voice From the Echo of Moscow program, 7 January 2013

Andrey Vyacheslavovich Kuraev (Russian: Андре́й Вячесла́вович Кура́ев; born 15 February 1963) is a Russian theologian, philosopher, publicist, blogger, and missionary. Since 3 April 2024, he has been a Protodeacon of the Church of Constantinople (since July 2024, a clergyman of the Exarchate of the Ecumenical Patriarchate in Lithuania).

Kuraev is the author of the first textbook on the Fundamentals of Orthodox Culture. He was formerly protodeacon of the Church of Archangel Michael in Troparevo of the Diocese of Moscow of the Russian Orthodox Church.

On 29 December 2020, by decision of the Moscow Diocesan Court, Kuraev was defrocked, which came into force after the decision's approval by Patriarch Kirill of Moscow and All Rus' on 28 April 2023. Kuraev himself did not recognize the decision, citing the fact that at the time of his defrocking, he was no longer under the jurisdiction of the Moscow Diocese and, as a result, the decisions of Patriarch Kirill as the ruling bishop of the Moscow Diocese do not apply to him. On 3 April 2024, Ecumenical Patriarch Bartholomew of Constantinople reinstated his ecclesiastical rank.

== Life ==
=== Childhood and education ===
Kuraev's father, Vyacheslav Kuraev, was the secretary of the director of the Institute of Philosophy of the USSR Academy of Sciences and member of the Central Committee of the Communist Party of the Soviet Union Pyotr Fedoseyev.

In high school, Kuraev published the wall newspaper Atheist. He was a member of the Komsomol since 1977 and a member of the Philosophical Society of the USSR since 1982.

By Kuraev's own admission, his conversion to faith was influenced by his acquaintance with the works of Fyodor Dostoevsky in his third year at university, and in particular with the novel The Brothers Karamazov and the "legend of the Grand Inquisitor" included in it.

In 1984, Kuraev graduated with honors from Moscow State University.

In 1985, Kuraev fulfilled his long-held desire and entered (on the recommendation of Archpriest Georgy Breyev) the Moscow Theological Seminary, where he studied until 1988. His admission was influenced by the specialist in Old Russian literature Vyacheslav Grikhin, who had previously prepared Kuraev for admission to Moscow State University. He graduated from the Moscow Theological Academy in 1992. From 1988 to 1990 he studied at the Faculty of Orthodox Theology at the University of Bucharest.

== Church service ==
On 8 July 1990, Kuraev was ordained a deacon by Patriarch Teoctist Arăpașu at the Romanian Patriarchal Cathedral. According to some sources, from September 1990 to 1992 he was the official press secretary and speechwriter of Patriarch Alexy II of Moscow.

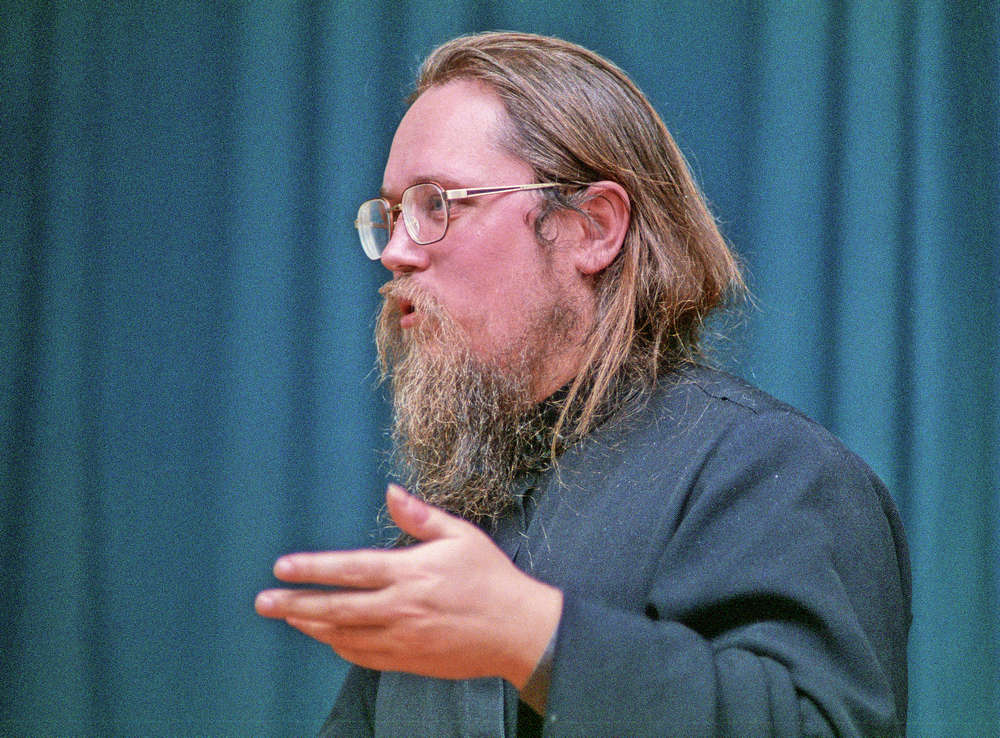
Andrey Kuraev at a meeting with Pereslavl residents in the Pereslavl gymnasium, 1997

In 1993-1996, Kuraev was the Dean of the Philosophical and Theological Faculty of the Russian Orthodox University of St. John the Theologian. According to his own recollections, "I was one of the founders of the Russian Orthodox University, the dean of its philosophical and theological faculty. Accordingly, I had the opportunity to create the university of my dreams. They say that every writer writes the book that he would simply dream of reading. So I did: I created the university where I would dream of studying. Moreover, there was one person who helped with money, and thanks to him I could invite professors one by one, whose lectures I was ready to listen to myself. And so they read for my students."

In 1994, at the Institute of Philosophy of the Russian Academy of Sciences, under the scientific supervision of Pavel Gurevich, Kuraev defended his dissertation for the academic degree of candidate of philosophical sciences on the topic of "Philosophical and anthropological interpretation of the Orthodox concept of the fall." In 1995, he defended his dissertation "Tradition. Dogma. Rite" for the degree of candidate of theology at the Moscow Theological Academy.

In 2002, Kuraev was a senior research fellow at the Department of Philosophy of Religion and Religious Studies of the Philosophy Faculty of Moscow State University. On 12 March 2002, by decision of the Synod, he was included in the editorial board of the collection Theological Works, on 24 December 2004, in the Synodal Theological Commission, and on 31 March 2009, in the then-newly created Church-Public Council for Protection from the Alcohol Threat.

In 2004, following the Beslan school siege, Kuraev wrote a book entitled "How to Relate to Islam after Beslan", igniting an intense emotional discussion in Russian society. A similar, and even more intense, discussion occurred after Kuraev commented on the ethnic and religious background of the Tsarnaev brothers, the masterminds behind the Boston Marathon bombing in April 2013.

In 2005, Kuraev tried to organize the picket "to defend Russian Christmas" near Catholic Cathedral in Moscow. The picket was scheduled for 24 December, when Catholics celebrate Christmas, with the slogans: "Russian Christmas is 7 January", "Stop the defamation of Russian Orthodox Church!", "Orthodox Church is not late. It is loyal!"

In 2006, Kuraev succeeded in organizing anti-Madonna's Confessions Tour concert protests with the slogan "Madonna", go home!". Kuraev was mostly offended by the singer's so-called "pseudonym" and complete lack of religious common knowledge. In 2013, he welcomed Madonna's new "illegal gastarbeiter" status in Russia, adding that "her masturbation on stage using a crucifix is not an art". In 2019, Kuraev, a vivid Russian rock fan, said Wikipedia was his source of knowledge about the entertainer: "It's written in there that she was inserting a crucifix into her vagina and masturbated with it during her concerts. It doesn't inspire me".

Several media outlets reported that Kuraev criticized the politics of the Mejlis of the Crimean Tatar People, the ethnic parliament of the Crimean Tatars, during a lecture tour in Crimea in September 2006. He drew an analogy between the policy of the mejlis and mob behavior among young men in society.

Kuraev was named "man of the year" by a media organization in 2008.

On 5 April 2009, during the liturgy in Saint Isaac's Cathedral, Patriarch Kirill of Moscow elevated Kuraev to the rank of protodeacon (Note: Proto-deacon means first-servant (in Greek). In the Russian Orthodox Church it is an honorary title given to married deacons although Kuraev is not married and he is also celibate according to his supporter Alexander Nevzorov) and awarded him a double orarion and kamilavka for his active missionary service and work with youth. On 27 July, he became a member of the Inter-Council Presence of the Russian Orthodox Church.

Since October 2013, Kuraev has written about the existence of the "gay lobby" inside the Russian Orthodox Church, provoking various negative responses from church officials.

By decision of the Academic Council of the Moscow Theological Academy on 30 December 2013, Kuraev was dismissed from the teaching staff and expelled him from the Academy's professorship for his activity in the media and blogosphere, which it found "outrageous" and "scandalous and provocative." Kuraev was outraged by the dismissal and linked it to his posts in LiveJournal about the homosexual scandal at the Kazan Theological Seminary and his disagreement with the criminal prosecution and imprisonment of the members of the Pussy Riot group. The homosexual scandal resulted in an investigation, in March 2014, and the dismissal of most seminary administration members. Kuraev has also been outspoken about the criminal process and prison punishment of Pussy Riot group members.

Kuraev was not included in the new composition of the Inter-Council Presence, approved on 23 October 2014 by the decision of the Holy Synod.

In November 2016, Kuraev was included in the list of persons prohibited from entering the territory of Latvia.

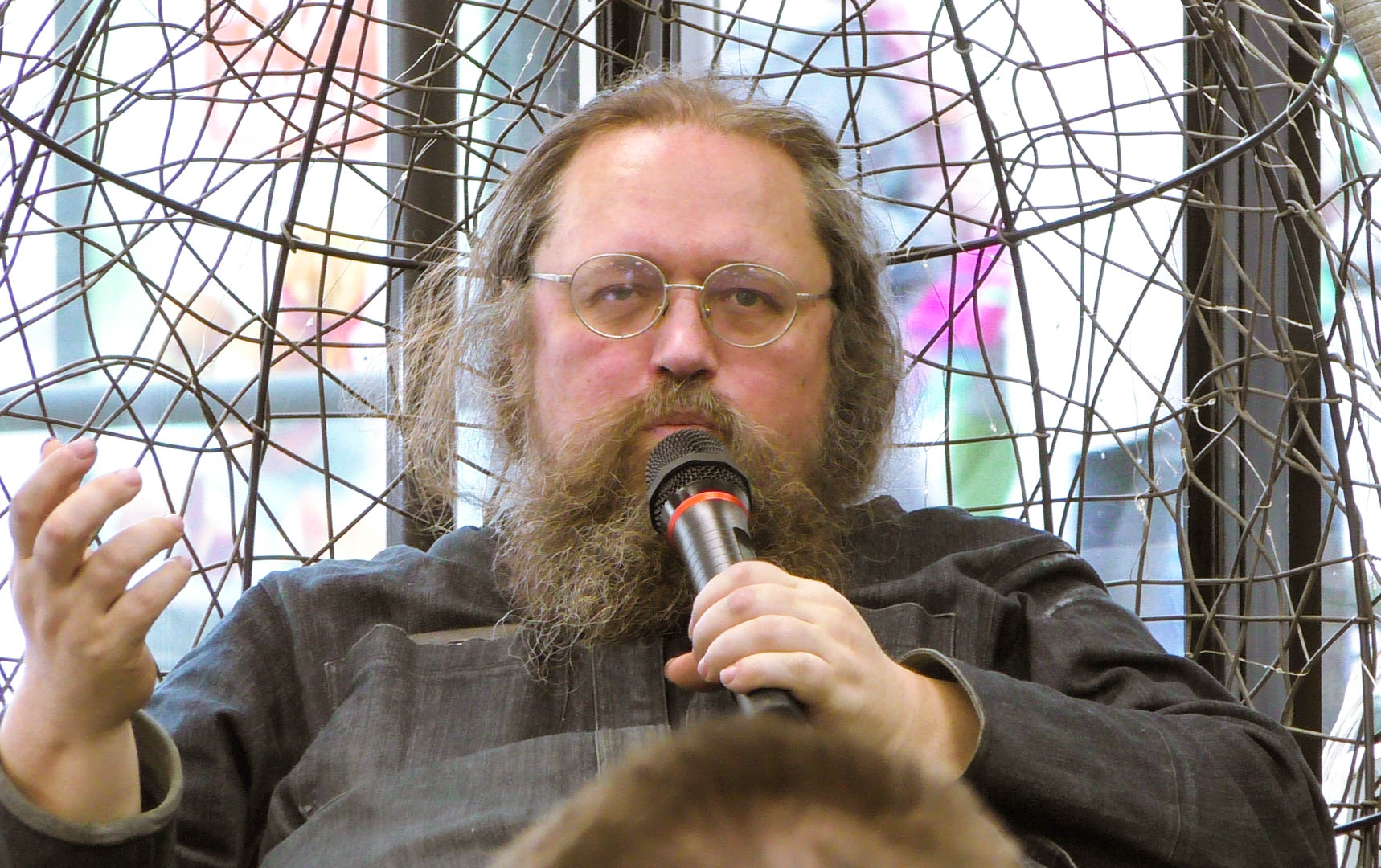
Andrey Kuraev at a meeting with readers, 2017

In May 2017, Kuraev was given a penance in the form of a sorokoust, which he performed at the Novospassky Monastery.

=== Reprimands in the Russian Orthodox Church ===
On 29 April 2020, Kuraev was banned from serving by Patriarch Kirill for insulting the memory of the late rector of the Yelokhovo Cathedral, Archpriest Alexander Ageikin.

On 29 December 2020 the Moscow Diocesan Church Court considered the case in absentia, noting the "insulting characterization of Archpriest Alexander Ageikin, who died that day from the consequences of coronavirus infection," and "established signs of blasphemy against the Church in the statements of Archdeacon Andrey Kuraev," as well as the presence of signs of "slanderous activity by Archdeacon Andrei Kuraev, in particular, accusations against the Russian Orthodox Church of 'organizing a schism'." The court decided to recognize "him as subject to defrocking," while specifically noting that "the decision to defrock Protodeacon Andrei Kuraev will come into force if it is approved by the ruling bishop of Moscow - the Patriarch of Moscow and All Rus', and before that, within the established time period, it can be appealed" in the General Church Court of Second Instance. On 11 January 2021, Kuraev sent his petition to Patriarch Kirill to review the case.

On 4 March 2021, the Moscow Diocesan Court, "having examined the petition received from Archdeacon Andrey Kuraev to review case No. 50-54-2020 ... found no reason for such a review and confirmed the previously adopted decision," stating that it "may be appealed to the General Church Court of Second Instance." On 4 April 2021, Patriarch Kirill, by his resolution, confirmed the decision of the diocesan court, but at the same time made the following reservation: "This decision will enter into force after the issuance of a decree on the defrocking of Archdeacon Andrey Kuraev. A moratorium is imposed on the issuance of the decree for the time that is given to Archdeacon Andrey to rethink his position and return to the path of the Church that he chose at one time."

On 23 August 2022, the Nikulinsky Raion Court in Moscow fined Kuraev 30 thousand Russian rubles for "discreditation" of the Russian Armed Forces that he allegedly did in his LiveJournal post about the Russian invasion of Ukraine.

On 28 April 2023, the text of the patriarchal decree on the defrocking of Archdeacon Andrey Kuraev appeared on the official website of the Diocese of Moscow. The reason given for the decision was Kuraev's having "not shown any signs of repentance" and not having ceased his "destructive activities."

On 16 October 2023, Kuraev announced his departure from Russia and move to Prague. On 22 December 2023, he was included in the register of "foreign agents" by the Russian Ministry of Justice.

=== Restoration to rank and transfer to the Patriarchate of Constantinople ===
On 3 April 2024, Ecumenical Patriarch Bartholomew of Constantinople declared Kuraev's defrocking illegal, repealing Patriarch Kirill's decree, and reinstated him in the priesthood, accepting him into the clergy of the Ecumenical Patriarchate of Constantinople. Archpriest Vladislav Tsypin stated that such an act on the part of the Ecumenical Patriarch is "canonically invalid, untenable", that "he obviously has no right to accept appeals from clergy of other local churches, except for his own patriarchate."

On 23 July 2024, Kuraev was accepted into the clergy of the Exarchate of the Ecumenical Patriarchate in Lithuania, in accordance with the submitted petition. The official website of the Exarchate explained: "Protodeacon Andrey Kuraev will continue his church service in the missionary field and will not be tied to any parish, but, continuing to adhere to church rules, will proclaim the Gospel in different cities and countries."

In late 2024, Kuraev published the book „Mythology of Russias Wars“, in which he debunks - amongst others - the myth, that Russia had historically never attacked another country. He also illustrates the fighting of religious wars by Russia.

== Teaching activities ==
On 29 June 2009, by order of Patriarch Kirill, Archdeacon Andrei Kuraev was appointed chairman of the editorial board for writing the textbook Fundamentals of Orthodox Culture for secondary schools.

== Controversies ==
=== Statements on Orthodoxy ===
==== Evaluation of "Sergianism" and Patriarch Gregory V ====
In his article "Only for the Motherland, but not for Stalin!" published in the journal Blagodatny Ogon' (2004), Kuraev quoted at length the texts of the excommunication letters against Greek revolutionaries signed at the end of March 1821 by Ecumenical Patriarch Gregory V of Constantinople, and pointed out that already at the end of that century the Greeks perceived him not as a traitor, but as a martyr. Kuraev had expressed similar thoughts earlier. In the article, Kuraev stated:

Today, only the lazy do not throw stones at Patriarch Sergius (Stragorodsky). How dare he, they say, cooperate with the Soviet authorities? ... And what happened there, in Greece? How did other Orthodox nations live for one and a half thousand years under the Muslims? In Egypt, Antioch, Palestine, Serbia, Bulgaria - who knows about their one and a half thousand year experience of church life in captivity? But it was precisely this experience that Patriarch Sergius (Stragorodsky) recalled when the Russian Church found itself in slavery ... Patriarch Sergius was anything but a modernist. A secular person could say here: "In Sergius, the age-old servile policy of the Orthodox Church in relation to the authorities continued." Such a critic will be challenged in his assessment, but he will be right in recording the fact: the policy of Metropolitan Sergius is not modern ... An Orthodox person has no right to contrast the 20th century with previous centuries of church history, or Patriarch Sergius with Saint Patriarch Gregory V.

For this, Kuraev was accused by historian and publicist Nikolai Selishchev of "slandering the Greek Orthodox new martyrs" and of lying and ignorance:

Oddly enough, in the Turkish Empire the patriarch had more power than in the Byzantine Empire or than in Muscovite Rus', because in the Turkish Empire the patriarch was given all power over the Church in spiritual matters. But in addition to this, the Turkish Empire entrusted the patriarch with power over the civil life of Christian subjects. That is, the patriarch is an ethnarch... All disputes between Christians are resolved by the patriarch and the clergy locally: this is the so-called Phanariote system. And how do the Greek Church and the Greek people feel about the name of Patriarch Gregory V today? Have they cursed the traitor? No, they began to erect monuments to him already at the end of the 19th century...

After Nikolai Selishchev had made repeated appeals to the priests of the Metropolitan chanceries and Father Eleutherios Hatzis, one of the oldest hierarchs of the Greek Church, Metropolitan Panteleimon (Karanikolas) of Corinth, who was then the chairman of the Synodal Committee on Dogmatic and Canonical Issues, spoke out against Kuraev's position.

=== Position in the 2009 patriarchal elections ===
Yulia Taratuta, a correspondent for the Kommersant newspaper, noted at the end of January 2009 that during the elections for the Patriarch of Moscow and all Rus', Deacon Kuraev, publicly speaking on the side of Metropolitan Kirill, used accusations against his competitors for the patriarchal throne: in December 2008, he accused the brother of Metropolitan Kliment (Kapalin) of Kaluga, Archbishop Dimitry (Kapalin), of allegedly organizing the "false elections" of delegates to the Local Council from theological schools, which took place at the Moscow Theological Academy, and also carried out a "raider seizure of the Moscow Theological Academy."

=== Attitude to creationism and Darwinism ===
In his pamphlet Orthodoxy and Evolution, Kuraev criticized Protestant creationist authors for their rejection of the theory of evolution. In particular, he noted:

There is no textual or doctrinal basis for rejecting evolutionism in Orthodoxy. It makes no sense for the Orthodox to indulge the social fashion for irrationalism (any irrationalism will ultimately work in favor of occultism and against the Church).<…> Thus, unlike paganism, which demonizes matter, and Protestantism, which deprives the created world of the right to co-creation, Orthodoxy has no basis for denying the thesis that the Creator created matter capable of beneficial development. The very essence of the process of the world's unfolding does not change regardless of the speed at which it occurs. And those who vaguely think that God becomes unnecessary if we stretch out the process of creation are naive. Equally naive are those who believe that the creation of the world in more than six days diminishes the greatness of the Creator. It is important for us to remember that nothing interfered with or limited the creative action. Everything happened according to the will of the Creator. And whether this will consisted in creating the world instantly, or in six days, or in six thousand years, or in myriads of centuries, we do not know.

—

In his 1999 book Does It Matter How to Believe?, Kuraev criticized Darwinism, comparing it to a hurricane that will never put together a superliner, and spoke about the haste of Darwin's conclusions:

By the way, Darwin's "theory of evolution" proved only one thing - its boundless confidence in its own merits. What did Darwin see as the "engine of progress"? - The "struggle of species for survival" and "natural selection". Both, of course, exist (although modern ecology says that species cooperate rather than fight, and Darwin was too hasty in transferring the morals of early capitalist society to nature). But explaining everything by "natural selection" is the same as saying that AvtoVAZ is developing and releasing new models only because it has a quality control department that does not release defective cars outside the plant. After all, it is not the quality control department that creates new models! And "mutations" cannot explain much here. They undoubtedly exist, but if they are only random, then they are nothing more than a series of hurricanes. A hurricane sweeping through an airplane graveyard is more likely to assemble a brand new superliner than random "mutations" — molecular-level hurricanes — will create a living cell or a new species. After all, in "neo-Darwinism," the theory of evolution looks like this: if you punch a black-and-white "Gorizont" for a long time, it will eventually become a color "Panasonic." If you beat a dried bream against a tabletop for a long time, someday it will grow wings and sing like a nightingale.

—

=== Statements against the "homosexual lobby" in the Russian Orthodox Church ===
In October 2013, after a meeting of the Holy Synod, Kuraev wrote in his blog about the presence of "blue" (a Russian colloquial term for gay) bishops in the Russian Orthodox Church.

Kuraev reported on the inspection conducted in December 2013 by the Educational Committee of the Russian Orthodox Church at the Kazan Theological Seminary, related to complaints from seminary students about sexual harassment and rape by the seminary's leadership. According to Andrei Kuraev, the "blue lobby" since Soviet times, with the help of the KGB, and then independently, managed to advance 40% (about 40 people) of "homo-hierarchs" from the lowest church levels to the episcopate, while many of the rest cover for them.

=== Statements about cultural figures ===
==== Madonna concerts ====
Kuraev has been a consistent critic of Madonna during each of her three visits to Russia. Before the singer's first visit to Russia with the Confessions Tour, he appeared on the Russia-1 TV channel. In his speech, he condemned the use of the name "Madonna" as a stage name and her use of a cross during her performances. The concert in Moscow was the only one of her 60 performances on the tour that did not gather a full house: scalpers were unable to sell tickets. Kuraev said after this: "People are simply tired of being fed pensioners and veterans of the Western stage. In this case, the public's reaction to the attitude towards Russia as some kind of third-rate market also manifested itself."

In 2012, during The MDNA Tour, after Madonna announced her intention to speak out in support of homosexuals at her concert in St. Petersburg, Kuraev called on the Ministry of Foreign Affairs not to grant the artist an entry visa, and also jokingly asked those who disagreed to report a bomb planted at the stadium. Although the concerts of that tour took place, the St. Petersburg trial against the singer ended in the plaintiffs' favor, which disappointed the archdeacon: "It would be good to take a fine from her, and I am amazed by the weakness of our authorities." In 2014, Judge Barkovsky, who acquitted Madonna, was demoted, and in August 2015, the singer announced that she would never come to Russia again.

==== Christening of Philip Kirkorov's daughter ====
After the birth of singer Philipp Kirkorov's surrogate daughter and her christening, Kuraev demanded that Kirkorov be excommunicated from the church. He defended his position on the program Poyedinok on 26 April 2012, where his opponent was the singer Lolita Milyavskaya, who defended Kirkorov and surrogacy.

Kuraev described the program as follows:

But it was important for me to take this topic out of the realm of scandalous pop. This is not about the funny adventure of Philip Kirkorov, this is not about my supposedly scandalous character, and not about some religious hang-ups that supposedly determine the position of the Church (I have not given a single religious argument against surrogacy!). This is about a fundamental question of ethics - the question of human dignity, whether there is a price for a human being. This is the price of yourself. Anyone who buys or sells a child today should be prepared for the fact that tomorrow they themselves may be sold.

=== Ukraine ===
On March 29, 2014, in his official blog, Kuraev outlined his vision of the consequences of Russia's annexation of Crimea in nine points, which he called "obviously sad," and stated that "Russia is losing more than it is gaining." He noted multiple negative consequences for Russia. On 2 May, Gazeta.Ru published an interview with Kuraev, in which he expressed the opinion that "the annexation of Crimea gave rise to the spread of Russophobic sentiments throughout Ukraine."

In an interview for the Echo of Moscow on 25 July 2014, Kuraev supported the Patriarch's "non-arrival" in Kyiv in the current situation and acknowledged the fact that most residents of Crimea identify with Russia and the viability of the peninsula's current status, noting that the annexation "went well," without casualties. Sharply criticizing the coverage of the situation in the Russian media, he also condemned the Donbass militia army for using Orthodox slogans "for their own purposes, but nothing more":

That is, they can call themselves the Orthodox army of Donbass. For such people, the church is good only when it supports me. When it gives grounds to consider my usual hatred sacred. Then yes. Then, fathers, we are with you. But if you tell him that, forgive me, hatred cannot be sacred and there is no need to justify pulling the trigger with the Gospel, then they will tell you that you are talking heresy.

Kuraev called the granting of autocephaly to the Orthodox Church of Ukraine by the Ecumenical Patriarch of Constantinople "the return of millions of our brothers to canonical Orthodoxy" and suggested that Patriarch Kirill also sign the tomos.

After the Russian invasion of Ukraine, Kuraev took an anti-war position and actively criticized the decisions of Patriarch Kirill and the policies of the Russian Orthodox Church. He was fined for "discrediting the Russian army" and left Russia in October 2023.

== Awards ==
In 2005, the Rambler search engine recognized Kuraev as "Person of the Year" in the "Religion" section.

In 2006, the Catholic Church in Poland awarded Kuraev the St. Albert Chmielewski Medal "for many years of missionary and evangelistic activity in the territory of the CIS member countries."

On 30 January 2007, Metropolitan Volodymyr Sabodan of Kyiv and All Ukraine awarded Kuraev the Order of Nestor the Chronicler, 3rd degree, "For services to the Ukrainian Orthodox Church and in recognition of his many years of missionary and educational work aimed at preaching Orthodoxy and opposing schisms and sects."

In 2008, Kuraev became a laureate of the All-Russian "Person of the Year" award.

In 2012, Kuraev was awarded the medal of the Russian Orthodox Church "In Memory of the 200th Anniversary of Victory in the Patriotic War of 1812."

== Publications ==
- Kuraev A. "Мифология русских войн" (‘The Mythology of Russian Wars.’, BAbook Publishing House, 2024. (Russian)
- Kuraev A. Provocarile ecumenismului. Bucuresti, ed. Sofia, 2006. (Romanian)
- Kuraev A.V. "Harry Potter" in church: between anaphema and smile: Should one give an indulgence to fairy tales? Is the magical non-dead demonic? ... Truth of «Harry Potter» — Neva, 2003. — 123 pages — ISBN 5-7654-2901-7
- Kuraev A.V. «Harry Potter»: a try to be not scared / Deacon Andrey Kuraev. — Andreevskiy flag, 2004. — 205 pages — ISBN 5-9553-0035-X
- Kuraev A.V. Gifts and anaphemas : what Christianity brought to word? : thoughts on the edge of millennium. / Nikea; Arefa, 2009. — 319 pages — ISBN 978-5-91761-001-6
- Kuraev A. Daruri si anathemele. Bucuresti, 2004. (Romanian)
- Kuraev A. Tajemnica Izraela // Fronda. Warszawa, 1999, No. 17/18. (Polish)
- Kuraev A.V. How to relate to Islam after Beslan? / Deacon Andrey Kuraev. — 2004 — 127 pages — ISBN 5-9900367-1-X
  - Kuraev A. Mostenirea lui Hristos. Ceea ce n-a intrat in Evanghelie. Bucuresti, ed. Sofia, 2009 (Romanian)
  - Non-American missioner / Deacon Andrey Kuraev. — Saratov, 2006. — 463 pages — ISBN 5-98599-028-1
- Religy without God. — 2006. — 527 pages. — ISBN 5-7789-0209-3
  - Kuraev A. Pecetea lui antihrist, codurile de bare si semnele vremurilor. Bucuresti, 2005.(Romanian)
- Kuraev A.V. Fantasy and truth of "The Da Vinci Code": AST-Zebra, 2006.
  - Kuraev A. Pantheism and Monotheism // The Russian Idea. In search of a new identity. Ed. By Wendy Helleman. Bloomington, Indiana, 2004. (Partial translation to English)
- Kuraev A.V. Christianity on the edge of history : About our defeat / Deacon Andrey Kuraev. : Palomnik, 2003. — ISBN 5-87468-208-2
  - Kuraev A.V. Church and youth : is the conflict imminent? And about rock music... Rus. ostrov, 2004. — ISBN 5-902565-01-4
- David Baggett Harry Potter and Philosophy: If Aristotle Ran Hogwarts; [from English] [afterword by Deacon Andrey Kuraev]. — Amfora 2005. (Lenizdat). — 430 pages — (Novaya Evrika). — ISBN 5-94278-892-8
