= Dmitry Chesnokov (politician) =

Soviet politician (1910–1973)

- Дмитрий Чесноков

Chairman of the State Committee for Radio and Television Broadcasting
- In office 27 May 1957 – 28 May 1959
- Premier: Nikita Khrushchev
- Preceded by: Position established
- Succeeded by: Sergey Kaftanov

Personal details
- Born: 7 January 1910 Kaplino, Starooskolsky Uyezd, Kursk Governorate, Russian Empire
- Died: 15 September 1973 (aged 63) Moscow, Russia
- Resting place: Danilov Cemetery
- Party: CPSU
- Education: Moscow State Pedagogical University
- Profession: Philosopher, editor, politician
- Awards: Order of Lenin; Order of the Red Banner of Labour; Order of the Badge of Honour; Stalin Prize

Academic work
- Institutions: Ural State Pedagogical University

Dmitry Ivanovich Chesnokov (Russian: Дми́трий Ива́нович Чесноко́в; 25 October [7 November] 1910 – 17 September 1973) was a Soviet professor of philosophy, journalist and politician.

== Biography ==
Born in to a peasant family, Chesnokov graduated from the Moscow State Pedagogical University in 1931. From 1931 to 1943 he was a lecturer at the Sverdlov State University in the Urals and eventually became the head of its pedagogical department.

Chesnokov who had been a member of the All-Union Communist Party since 1939, became head of the department of the Sverdlovsk City Committee of the VKP (b) from 1943 to 1946 and in 1946-1947 he was secretary of the Sverdlovsk city committee of the VKP (b) for propaganda.

After his lecture at the philosophical discussions of 1947, he was invited to Moscow and became the deputy head of the Science Department of the Directorate of Agitation and Propaganda of the All-Union Communist Party (b).

Doctor of Philosophy from 1951, professor, specialist in Russian philosophy. He became Member of the USSR Academy of Education and became the author of many books.

In 1952-1953 he was Head of the Department of Philosophy and History of the Central Committee, member of the Standing Committee on Ideological Issues under the Presidium of the Central Committee of the CPSU and editor-in-chief of the Kommunist magazine.

At the 19th Congress of the CPSU Dmitry Chesnokov became a member of the Politburo (Presidium) of the CPSU Central Committee. Joseph Stalin at the end of his life predicted him to be one of the main ideologues of the Communist Party. However, the day after Stalin's death, Chesnokov was removed on 5 March 1953 from the Presidium of the CPSU Central Committee and eventually from the Central Committee in 1956.

From 1953 to 1955 he was department head of the Gorky Regional Committee of the CPSU and from 1955 to 1957 was Secretary of the Gorky Regional Committee of the CPSU. He also worked at the Gorky Pedagogical Institute.

In 1957 he was appointed Chairman of the State Committee for Radio and Television under the USSR Council of Ministers.

From 1948 to 1960, he was head of the Department of Dialectical and Historical Materialism (1959–1960) and, with its division, head of the department of Historical Materialism (1960–1967) of the philosophy faculty of Moscow State University.

From 1967 to 1970, he was vice-rector of the Academy of Social Sciences under the Central Committee of the CPSU. Full member of the USSR Academy of Pedagogical Sciences in the Department of Theory and History of Pedagogy from 30 January 1968.

Chesnokov retired in 1970. He was buried in Moscow at the Danilovskoye cemetery.

== Works ==
Books:

- Мировоззрение Герцена. М., Госполитиздат, 1948
- Марксизм-ленинизм о базисе и надстройке. Лекции. М., 1951
- Советское социалистическое государство. М., Госполитиздат, 1952
- Роль социалистического государства в строительстве коммунизма. М., Соцэкгиз, 1959
- Исторический материализм. М., Мысль, 1964. (2-е изд. 1965)
- Материалистическое понимание истории и строительство коммунизма в СССР. М., [б. и.], 1965
- Исторический материализм как социология марксизма-ленинизма. / Акад. обществ. наук при ЦК КПСС. Кафедра марксистско-ленинской философии. — М.: Мысль, 1973. — 319 с.

Articles:

- И. В. Сталин о большевистской партии как руководящей силе Советского государства // Вопросы марксистско-ленинской философии. М., 1950;

Preceded by Bonifaty Kedrov	Editor-in-Chief of the Voprosy Filosofii; 1949—1952	Succeeded by Fyodor Konstantinov
