= Under the Banner of Marxism =

Soviet philosophical and socio-economic journal

- Language: Russian
- Edited by: Vagarshak Ter-Vaganyan (1922-23); Abram Deborin (1926-31); Mark Mitin (1931-44); Mikhail Iovchuk (1944)

Publication details
- Frequency: Monthly
- ISO 4: Find out here

Under the Banner of Marxism (Russian: Под знаменем марксизма, romanized: Pod znamenem marksizma) was a Soviet philosophical and socio-economic journal published in Moscow from 1922 to 1944. It was published monthly, except for 1933–1935, when it was published bi-monthly.

== History ==
In a letter published in the first issue, Trotsky wrote:

Arm the will and not only the thought, we say, because, in the era of great world upheavals, now more than ever before our will cannot break, but must harden only if it rests upon the scientific understanding of the conditions and causes of historical development

On the other hand, it is precisely in such a critical era as ours, especially if it drags on – i.e., if the pace of revolutionary events in the West proves slower than hoped for – that attempts of various idealist and semi-idealist philosophical schools and sects will likely possess the consciousness of young workers. Captured unaware by the events – without prior extensive experience of practical class struggle – the thought of young workers could be defenseless against various doctrines of idealism, which are essentially translations of religious dogma into the language of pseudo-philosophy. All of these schools, despite the diversity of their idealist, Kantian, empirio-critical, and other designations, in the end agree that consciousness, thought, knowledge prefaces matter, and not vice versa.

Alexander Bogdanov, referred to by the term "empirio-critical" saw this as an attack upon himself and his science of organisation, Tektology.

Let me remind you of my situation over the past three years. I was subjected not to tens, but, I believe, to hundreds of attacks by influential persons, and even influential circles – in official documents, public speeches, in newspaper, magazine articles, whole books. I once said that the magazine Under the Banner of Marxism is published half against me, while Sholom Dvolajckij, himself one of the closest employees of this journal, corrected me: "Not half, but completely." My attempts at responding were not published; and it would be unthinkable to answer everything.

After the death of Bogdanov UBM did publish Stefan Krivtsov's memories of Bogdanov.

The first responsible editor of the journal was Vagarshak Ter-Vaganyan who ran it from 1922 to 1923 and later Abram Deborin who edited the journal from 1926 until 1931, then from 1931 to 1944 the editor was Mark Mitin and the final editor was Mikhail Iovchuk before the journal was closed and succeeded by Problems of Philosophy.

Bonifaty Kedrov (first editor-in-chief of Problems of Philosophy) wrote:

Among Soviet philosophers, during 1922-1943 there was a magazine called Under the Banner of Marxism. It was born in early 1922, and in its issue No. 3 was printed a program article by VI Lenin "On the Significance of Militant Materialism". For 20 years, this magazine published a lot of good militant articles on their pages; but during the war it somehow faded and in the middle of 1943 its existence stopped altogether. It was not closed. No, it just did not have the strength to go out.

Problems of Philosophy was established in July 1947 as a successor to Under the Banner of Marxism.

== Articles ==
=== 1922 ===
No.1&2

- 3 Editorial
- 5 1. Leon Trotsky: Letter
- 8 2. Abram Deborin: Collapse of Europe or celebration of imperialism?
- 28 3. Vagarshak Ter-Vaganyan: Our Russian Spenglerians
- 33 4. Yevgeni Preobrazhensky: Debris of old Russia
- 36 5. Georgi Plekhanov: Augustin Thierry and the materialist conception of history, (from 1895)
- 50 6. Vladimir Vilensky-Sibiryakov: The problem of production and the revolution
- 59 7. Vagarshak Ter-Vaganyan: On Georgii Safarov's book The Colonial Revolution: The Case of Turkistan
- 63 8. Avetis Sultan-Zade: Question of Industrialization of India

Tribune

- 66 9. Party member: On courses for Marxist studies in the Socialist Academy
- 68 10. A. Frenkel: It is necessary to sharpen the revolutionary weapon

Bibliography

- 70 11. Arkady Timiryasev: Review: Relativity: The Special and the General Theory by Albert Einstein
- 73 12. Vagarshak Ter-Vaganyan: Marx and Engels Collected Works Vol. III
- 74 13. Vagarshak Ter-Vaganyan: Plekhanov's letter to Lavrov
- 76 14. B.Sch.: Gabriel Deville: Scientific socialism
- 77 15. Boris Pinson: Mehring. Historical materialism.
- 78 16. S. Gimmelfarb: Boris Gorev: Materialism - the philosophy of the proletariat
- 79 17. Vagarshak Ter-Vaganyan: Antionio Labriola. Historical materialism and philosophy
- 80 18. M. Pavlovich (pseudonym of Mikhail Veltman): Andrei Snesarev: Afghanistan

=== 1931 ===
- Ernst Kolman: "Hegel and Mathematics" (1931)
