= Mikhail Iovchuk =

Soviet philosopher and party official (1909–1990)

- Born: Mikhail Trifonovich Iovchuk; 19 November 1908; Brest Region, Russian Empire
- Died: 9 January 1990 (aged 81); Moscow, Russian Soviet Federative Socialist Republic, Soviet Union

Education
- Education: Krupskaya Academy of Communist Education; Institute of Red Professors

Philosophical work
- Era: Contemporary philosophy
- Region: Soviet philosophy
- School: Marxism-Leninism
- Main interests: Dialectical materialism, history of philosophy

Mikhail Trifonovich Iovchuk (Russian: Михаил Трифонович Иовчук; 19 November 1908 — 9 January 1990) was a Soviet philosopher, Communist Party official and Corresponding Member of the Academy of Sciences of the Soviet Union.

== Biography ==
Born in to a peasant family, Iovchuk joined the Communist Party in 1926.

He graduated from the Philosophy Department of the Krupskaya Academy of Communist Education in 1931. Until 1933, he also studied at the Institute of Red Professors. From 1933 to 1936 he was the head of the political department of a state farm in the Byelorussian SSR. From 1936 to 1939 he headed the departments of dialectical materialism and Marxism-Leninism at the Moscow Institute of Chemical Technology and the Moscow Timiryazev Agricultural Academy.

From September to November 1939 he was deputy head of the press and propaganda department of the Executive Committee of the Comintern. From November 1939 to September 1941 he was head of the propaganda department of the Executive Committee of the Comintern.

From 1941 to 1944 he worked in the Propaganda and Agitation Department of the Central Committee of the CPSU (B). From May to June 1944 he was the editor-in-chief of the magazine Under the Banner of Marxism. From May 1944 to February 1947 he was deputy head of the Propaganda and Agitation Department of the Central Committee of the CPSU (B). Simultaneously from 1943 to 1947 he headed the Department of History of Russian Philosophy at the Faculty of Philosophy of Moscow State University.

From 7 March 1947 to 15 February 1949 Iovchuk served as Secretary of the Central Committee of the Communist Party of Belarus (b) for propaganda and agitation. At the same time he headed the Department of Philosophy at the Belarusian State University.

From 1949 to 1953 he was head of the Department of Dialectical and Historical Materialism at the Ural State University in Sverdlovsk. Since 1953 he has been a professor at the Department of History of Marxist-Leninist Philosophy, Faculty of Philosophy of the Moscow State University. From 1957 to 1963 he was head of the Department of the History of Marxist-Leninist Philosophy at the Faculty of Philosophy of the Moscow State University.

From 1957 to 1970 he was head of the sector History of Marxism-Leninism the Institute of Philosophy of the USSR Academy of Sciences and editor-in-chief of the journal Philosophical Sciences. From 1966 he was Chairman of the Scientific Council of the USSR Academy of Sciences on the History of Public Opinion.

From October 1970 to March 1978 he was rector of the Academy of Social Sciences under the Central Committee of the CPSU. From March 1978 he was a consultant to the Institute of Marxism-Leninism under the Central Committee of the CPSU.

Iovchuk died on 9 January 1990. He was buried in Moscow at the Vvedenskoye Cemetery.

== Awards ==
- Order of Lenin
- Order of the October Revolution
- 2 Orders of the Red Banner of Labor
- Order of Friendship of Peoples
- Order of the Red Star
- Order of the Badge of Honor
