= Dialectical logic =

System of laws of thought

Dialectical logic is the system of laws of thought, developed within the Hegelian and Marxist traditions, which seeks to supplement or replace the laws of formal logic. The precise nature of the relation between dialectical and formal logic was hotly debated within the Soviet Union and China.

Contrasting with the abstract formalism of traditional logic, dialectical logic in the Marxist sense was developed as the logic of motion and change and used to examine concrete forms. Its proponents claim it is a materialist approach to logic, drawing on the objective, material world.

Stalin argued in his "Marxism and Problems of Linguistics" that there was no class content to formal logic and that it was an acceptable neutral science. This led to the insistence that there were not two logics, but only formal logic. The analogy used was the relationship between elementary and higher mathematics. Dialectical logic was hence concerned with a different area of study from that of formal logic.

The main consensus among dialecticians is that dialectics do not violate the law of contradiction of formal logic, although attempts have been made to create a paraconsistent logic.

Some Soviet philosophers argued that the materialist dialectic could be seen in the mathematical logic of Bertrand Russell; however, this was criticized by Deborin and the Deborinists as panlogicism.

Evald Ilyenkov held that logic was not a formal science but a reflection of scientific praxis and that the rules of logic are not independent of the content. He followed Hegel in insisting that formal logic had been sublated, arguing that logic needed to be a unity of form and content and to state actual truths about the objective world. Ilyenkov used Das Kapital to illustrate the constant flux of $A$ and $B$ and the vanity of holding strictly to either $A$ or $\neg A$, due to the inherent logical contradiction of self-development.

During the Sino-Soviet split, dialectical logic was used in China as a symbol of Marxism–Leninism against the Soviet rehabilitation of formal logic.

Recently, research on the formalization of dialectics also attracted scholars by applying formal non-classical logic such as paraconsistent logic.
