= Ivan Luppol =

Russian philosopher

- Иван Лу́ппол
- Born: 13 January 1896; Rostov-on-Don, Don Host Oblast, Russian Empire
- Died: 26 May 1943 (aged 47); Temlag, Mordovian ASSR, Soviet Union
- Political party: RKP(b)
- Board member of: Narkompros
- Partner: Nadezhda Peshkova

Academic background
- Education: MSU; IKP
- Thesis: Denis Diderot: Essays on Life and Worldview (1924)
- Influences: Abram Deborin

Academic work
- Discipline: Philosophy
- Sub-discipline: Historical materialism
- Institutions: Marx–Engels Institute
- Main interests: Russian and history of philosophy
- Russian Civil War
- Allegiance: Second International
- Branch: Red Army
- Service years: 1919-1921
- Rank: Komissar
- Battles: Western Front; Eastern Front; Caspian-Caucasian Front

Ivan Kapitonovich Luppol (Russian: Иван Капитонович Лу́ппол; 13 January 1896, Rostov-on-Don – 26 May 1943, Zubovo-Polyansky District) was a Soviet philosopher, literary critic and academician of the Academy of Sciences of the Soviet Union.

== Biography ==
Luppol attended the Faculty of Law of the Moscow State University (MSU), graduating in 1919. In the same year he worked as a propagandist and political worker in the Red Army and in 1920 he became a member of the Russian Communist Party (b). He then studied at the Department of Philosophy of the Institute of Red Professors, being a member the institute's first enrollment. His earlier works were about the philosophy of Denis Diderot.

From 1924 he worked at the Marx-Engels Institute and became director of its philosophy cabinet.

Luppol was among the supporters of Abram Deborin in the philosophical debates.

He was a professor at the Department of Historical Materialism at the Ethnological Faculty of MSU from 1925 to 1931, as well as a professor at the department, and then head of the Department of Marxist–Leninist Philosophy of the Institute of Red Professors from 1925 to 1938.

From 1929 to 1933 he headed the Glavnauka. Since 1934 he was Member of the Board of the Union of Soviet Writers. In 1935 he became a member of the directorate of the Institute of Russian Literature. Director and one of the organizers of the Gorky Institute of World Literature (1935–1941). He was chief editor of the State Publishing House of Fiction. Elected a corresponding member of the USSR Academy of Sciences in the Department of Social Sciences in 1933 and an academician in the same department in 1939.

Luppol was arrested in September 1940 and was held in the Saratov prison with Nikolai Vavilov. Initially he was sentenced to death but his sentence was later changed to twenty years of forced labor. He died in the Temlag camp in Mordovian ASSR in 1943. It is said prior to his death Luppol was to marry Nadezhda Peshkova, daughter-in-law of Maxim Gorky.

Luppol was rehabilitated by the decision of the Military Collegium of the Supreme Court of the Soviet Union in 1956.
