= Vladimir Adoratsky =

Russian Soviet historian and philosopher (1878–1945)

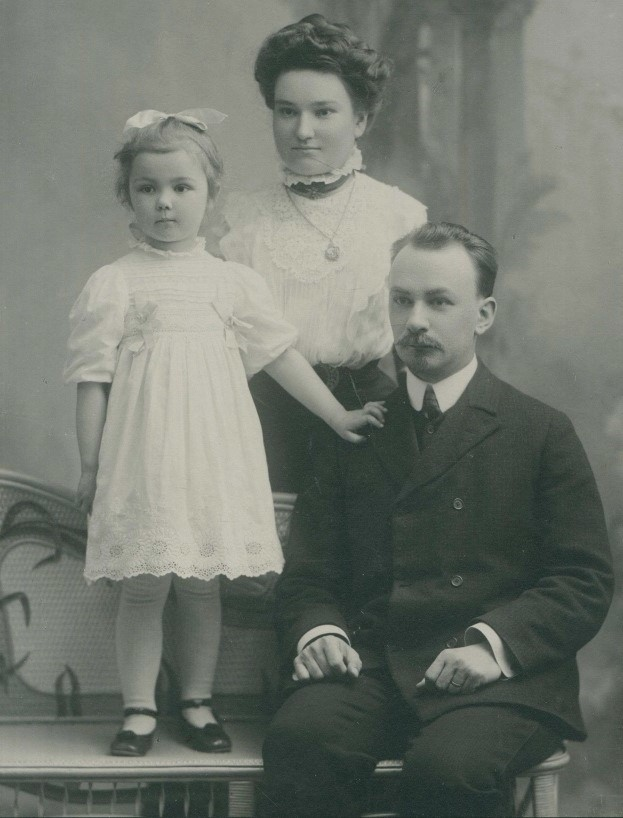
Vladimir Adoratsky with his wife and daughter in 1907

Vladimir Viktorovich Adoratsky (Russian: Владимир Викторович Адоратский; 19 August [O.S. 7 August] 1878 – 5 June 1945) was a Russian revolutionary, Soviet historian, academic and Marxist philosopher.

== Life and career ==
Adoratsky was born in Kazan in to the family of a petty official and nobleman. He graduated in law from the Kazan University, and joined the Bolshevik faction of the Russian Social Democratic Labour Party in 1904. Arrested in 1905, he was deported to Astrakhan province. After his release he emigrated to Geneva. Later, he lived in Paris, London - where he met Sidney and Beatrice Webb, Berlin and Munchen, returning to Russia in 1918.

From 1920 to 1928, he was assistant manager of the Central Archives Board, and from 1928 to 1931, deputy director of the Lenin Institute, and in 1932 a member of the Academy of Sciences of the Soviet Union. In the 1920s, he edited volumes of philosophical writings by Marx and Engels, and Lenin, and wrote a number of works on the Marxist theory of the state and law, and on the philosophy and history of Marxism.

In December 1929, during the celebration of Joseph Stalin's official 50th birthday (in fact, he was 51), leading soviet academics were expected to produce articles praising the leader's contribution to their disciplines. The veteran head of the Marx-Engels Institute, David Riazonov, and the foremost Soviet philosopher, Abram Deborin failed to comply, but Adoratsky stepped in with an article published in Izvestia, praising Stalin as a great Marxist theoretician.

Early in 1931, after a case had been fabricated against Riazonov, Adoratsky took his place, becoming head of the merged Marx–Engels and Lenin Institutes. He also headed the Department of Philosophy of the Communist Academy from 1931 to 1936 and the Institute of Philosophy of the USSR Academy of Sciences Institute of Philosophy from 1936 to 1939.

Forced to retire through ill health in 1939, he was replaced as head of the Marx–Engels–Lenin Institute by Mark Mitin. In July 1941, when the Institute was evacuated as the German army approached Moscow, Adoratsky pleaded that he was too ill to travel in a freight car, for which he was expelled from the institute and denied his salary. His daughter appealed to Mitin to intervene, but he refused. Adoratsky was then evacuated with other members of the Academy of Sciences to Alma Ata, where he fell seriously ill. After being discharged form hospital, he was allocated unheated rooms, where he had to live and work in the kitchen. He returned to Moscow in 1943, and died there on 5 June 1945.

He was buried at the Donskoye Cemetery in Moscow.

== Bibliography ==
- Adoratsky, V. Dialectical Materialism: The Theoretical Foundation of Marxism-Leninism, New York: International Publishers, 1934
- Adoratsky, V. The History of the Communist Manifesto of Marx and Engels New York: International Publishers, 1938
