= Joseph Fineberg =

Literary translator

- Józef Feinberg
- Born: 1886; Congress Poland
- Died: 1957 (aged 70–71)
- Political party: RKP(b)
- Other political affiliations: BCG; BSP
- Movement: Communism

Joe Fineberg (also spelt Feinberg; 1886–1957) was a prominent translator for the Communist International (Comintern). He produced English translations of works by Alexander Bogdanov, Nikolay Dobrolyubov, Ilya Ehrenburg, Vladimir Lenin, Boris Polevoy, Leo Tolstoy and others.

== Biography ==
Fineberg was born in Vistula Land but it was while in London that he became active in the Jewish Social Democratic Organisation (JSDO), a section of the British Socialist Party (BSP) for Jews based in London's East End. Although living in Hackney, he was secretary of the Stepney BSP branch. In 1918, Fineberg was invited as the guest of honour for a centenary celebration of Karl Marx's birth, organised by the JSDO and attended by members of The Workmen's Circle. His sibling Annie was an organiser in the Communist Party of Great Britain.

In July 1918, Fineberg moved to post-revolutionary Russia of his own volition, at a time when many of his comrades were being deported. Once there he became a translator for the Comintern and joined the British Communist Group in Russia. Fineberg was at the Founding Congress of the Comintern (2–6 March 1919).

== Works translated ==
Translation of Lenin's What Is To Be Done? by Fineberg

- Alexander Bogdanov & Šolom Dvolajckij: A Short Course of Economic Science (published in English in 1923)
- Lenin: What is to be done? (published in English in 1929)
- Lenin: "Left-Wing" Communism: An Infantile Disorder (published in English in 1935)
- Dobrolyubov, N. A. Selected philosophical essays. Moscow : Foreign Languages Publishing House. 1956. xlvi, 659 p. Translated by J. Fineberg.
- Ehrenburg, Ilya. The storm: a novel in six parts. Moscow : Foreign Languages Publishing House. 1948. [736] p. Translated by J. Fineberg.
- Golubov, S. Bagrattion : the honour and glory of 1812. Moscow : Foreign Languages Publishing House. 1945. [264] p. Translated by J. Fineberg.
- Gorky, M. Selected works in two volumes : volume 1 : stories plays. Moscow : Foreign Languages Publishing House. 1948. 698 p. Translated by B. Isaacs, J. Fineberg, Margaret Wettlin, R. Prokofieva, and H. Kasanina.
- Lenin, V. I. Collected works volume 4 : 1989 - April 1901. Moscow : Progress Publishers. 4th ed., 1977. 574 p. Translated by Joe Fineberg, George Hanna, and Victor Jerome.
- Lenin, V. I. Collected works volume 5 : May 1901 - February 1902. Moscow : Progress Publishers. 5th ed., 1977. 574 p. Translated by Joe Fineberg, George Hanna, and Victor Jerome.
- Lenin, V. I. Collected works volume 20 : December 1913 - August 1914. Moscow : Progress Publishers. 3rd ed., 1977. 625 p. Translated by Bernard Isaacs, Joe Fineberg, and Julius Katzer.
- Lenin, V. I. Collected works volume 23 : August 1916 - March 1917. Moscow : Progress Publishers. 5th ed., 1981. 427 p. Translated by M. S. Levin and Joe Fineberg.
- Lenin, V. I. Leiteisen, C. (editor). On peaceful coexistence. Moscow : Foreign Languages Publishing House. [256] p. Translated by George Hanna and Joseph Fineberg.
- Pavlenko, Pyotr. Happiness: a novel. Moscow : Foreign Languages Publishing House. 1950. [595] p. Series title: Library of selected Soviet literature. Translated by J. Fineberg.
- Plekhanov, G. V. The role of the individual in history. Moscow : Foreign Languages Publishing House. 1946. 56 p. Translated by J. Fineberg.
- Polevoi, Boris. Skvirsky, David (editor). A story about a real man. Moscow : Progress Publishers. 5th ed., 1973. 344 p. Series title: Progress Soviet authors library. Translated by Joe Fineberg.
- Safonov, V. Land in bloom. Moscow : Foreign Languages Publishing House. [544] p. Translated by J. Fineberg.
- Stepanov, A. Port Arthur: a historical narrative. Moscow : Foreign Languages Publishing House. 1947. 784 p. Translated by J. Fineberg.
- Tolstoy, Leo. Tales of Sevastopol. Moscow : Foreign Languages Publishing House. 1952. [154] p. Series title: Classics of Russian literature. Translated by J. Fineberg.
- Tolstoy, Lev. Tales of Sevastopol + The Cossacks. Moscow : Progress Publishers. 367 p. Series title: Progress Russian classics series. Translated by Robert Daglish and Joe Feinberg.
- Voroshilov, K., Zhdanov, A., Popkov, P., Tikhonov, N., Krukov, V., Fadeyev, A., Fyedorov, E., Luknitsky, P., Vishnevsky, V., Chukovsky, N., Indursky, S., Kunga, E., Farfal, S., Frantishev, L., Govorov, L., Gussev, D., Kuznetsov, A., Solovyov, N., Antonov, V., Bergholz, O., and Tikhonov, N. Heroic Leningrad: documents, sketches and stories of its siege and relief. Moscow : Foreign Languages Publishing House. 1945. [152] p. Translated by J. Fineberg.
- Wipper, R. Ivan Grozny. Moscow : Foreign Languages Publishing House. 1947. 254 p. Translated by J. Fineberg.
