= Gorky Institute of World Literature =

Soviet-Russian research institute

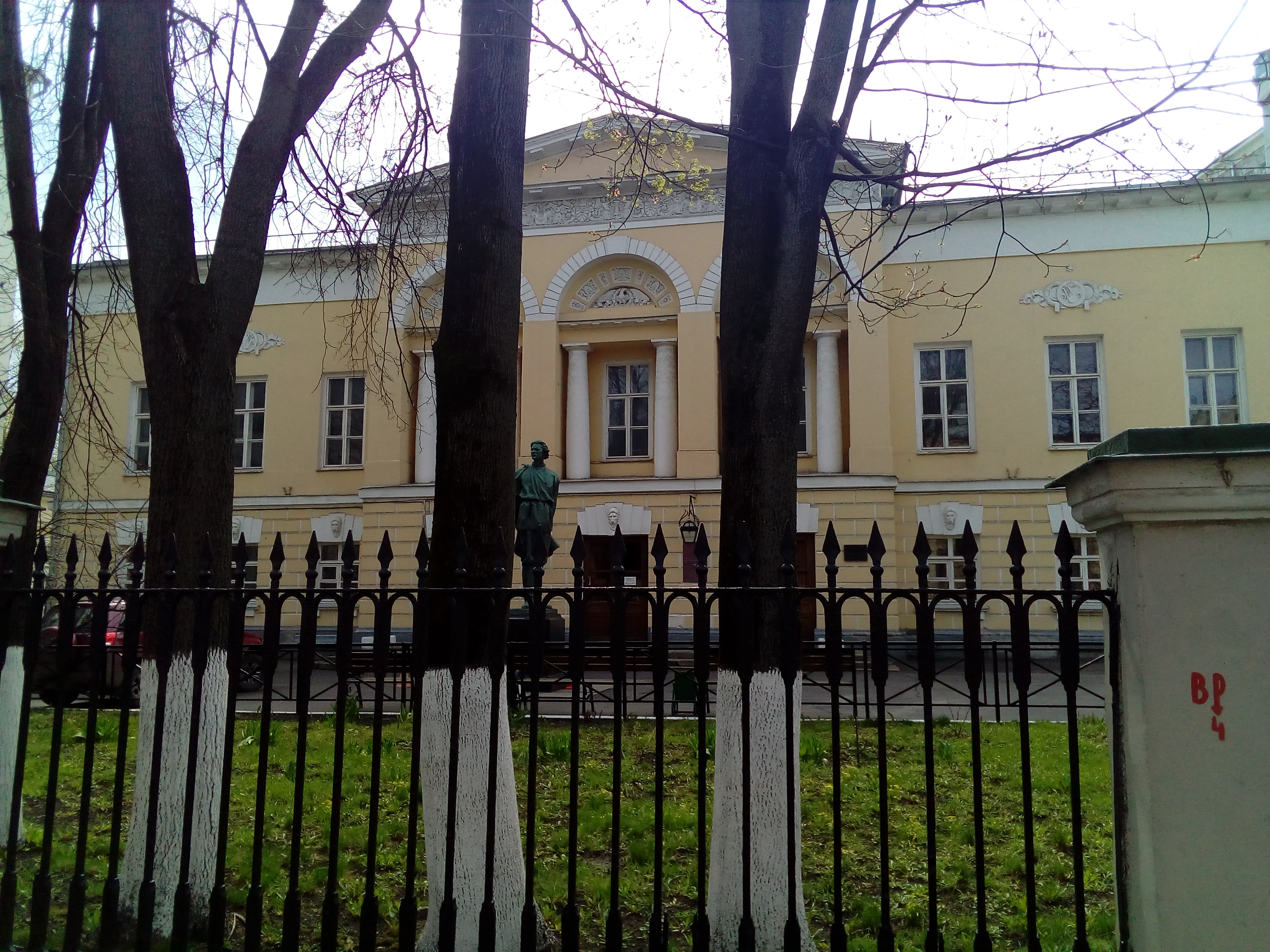
The Gorky Institute of World Literature. April 2018

The Gorky Institute of World Literature (IMLI; Russian: Институт мировой литературы им. А. М. Горького РАН) is a research institute of the Russian Academy of Sciences in Moscow.

Not to be confused with the Gorky Literary Institute, which is an institute of higher education that trains writers, the A. M. Gorky Institute of World Literature is a scientific research institute and part of the Russian Academy of Sciences. It was founded on 17 September 1932 for the 40th anniversary of Maxim Gorky's literary activity, and is located in the former estate of the Gagarin family in Moscow.

The institute is organized into departments, each specializing in a specific region or genre of literature. These departments include the Department of Literary Theory, Folklore, Old Slavic Literature, 19th Century Russian Literature, Contemporary Russian Literature and Russian Emigree Literature, Classical Western Literature and Comparative Literature, Literature of Asia and Africa, Contemporary European and American Literature, Literature of Russian Minorities and CIS Countries, and Manuscripts. There is also a department devoted to how Russian Literature is taught and disseminated abroad. The institute is also home to personal archives of writers, including Maxim Gorky and Andrei Platonov. In-house scholars devote themselves to publishing new works, and visiting scholars can also arrange to conduct research there, attend lectures, or speak about their work.

The Gorky Institute was established in 1932 by decree of the Central Executive Committee of the Soviet Union entitled, "On the events to mark the 40th Anniversary of the Literary Activity of Maxim Gorky." The institute was renamed from the Maxim Gorky Institute of Literature to the A. M. Gorky Institute of Literature in 1934 in accordance with another decree of the Presidium of the Central Committee, and Lev Kamenev was appointed as the first director.

On 14 February 1937, the Gorky Archive and Gorky Museum were added on, the latter of which opened on 1 November 1937. On 4 March 1938, they also opened the State Museum of Alexander Pushkin, which was later moved to Leningrad in 1949. On 16 April 1938, upon joining the Soviet (now Russian) Academy of Sciences, it received its current name. It is now located at the former estate of the Gagarins, which was built in the first quarter of the 19th Century by Italian architect Domenico Gilardi.

In 1950, an employee of the institute, Vera Stepanovna Nechaeva became a V. G. Belinksy Prize Laureate for the first volume of a four-volume biography of Vissarion Belinsky. In 1952 Nechaeva was appointed as head of the institute's Department of Texts.

== Directors of the Institute ==
Years	Director
1932–1934	L.B. Kamenev
1935–1936	I.K. Luppol
1936–1940	A. A. Kancheev
1940	I.K. Luppol (acting)
1941–1944	L. I. Ponomarev
1945–1947	acad. V.F.Shishmarev
1948–1952	Corresponding Member Academy of Sciences of the USSR A.M. Egolin
1952–1966	Corresponding Member USSR Academy of Sciences I. I. Anisimov
1966–1968	Corresponding Member Academy of Sciences of the USSR V.R.Shcherbina (acting)
1968–1974	Corresponding Member USSR Academy of Sciences B.L.Suchkov
1974–1975	Corresponding Member Academy of Sciences of the USSR V.R.Shcherbina (acting)
1975–1977	Yu. Ya. Barabash
1977–1987	Corresponding Member RAS G.P. Berdnikov
1987–2004	Corresponding Member RAS F. F. Kuznetsov
2005–2015	A. B. Kudelin
since 2015	Corresponding Member RAS V. V. Polonskiy
