= Pyotr Fedoseyev =

Soviet philosopher and politician

- Пётр Федосеев
- Born: August 22, 1908; Sergachsky Uyezd, Nizhny Novgorod Governorate, Russian Empire
- Died: October 18, 1990 (aged 82); Moscow, Russian SFSR, Soviet Union

Philosophical work
- Era: Contemporary philosophy
- Region: Soviet philosophy
- School: Marxism; Marxism-Leninism
- Main interests: Scientific communism, dialectical materialism, historical materialism

Pyotr Nikolayevich Fedoseyev (Russian: Пётр Николаевич Федосеев; August 22, 1908 – October 18, 1990) was a Soviet philosopher, sociologist, politician and public figure.

== Biography ==
Fedoseyev was born into a peasant family. In 1930 he graduated from the Gorky Pedagogical Institute and in the same year, from among the students of the socio-economic department of the pedagogical faculty, he was approved as a nominee for preparation for teaching philosophy. In 1936 he completed his postgraduate studies at the Moscow Institute of Philosophy, Literature, and History, having defended his dissertation for the degree of Candidate of Philosophical Sciences on the topic "Formation of Philosophical Views of F. Engels".

From 1936 to 1941, he was a researcher at the Institute of Philosophy of the Academy of Sciences of the Soviet Union. He received his Doctorate of Philosophical Sciences in 1940 with the dissertation Marxism-Leninism on religion and its overcoming. From 1941 to 1955, he worked in the apparatus of the Central Committee of the All-Union Communist Party of Bolsheviks and was the editor-in-chief of the magazine Bolshevik (later Kommunist). He was head of the department of dialectical materialism of the Academy of Social Sciences under the Central Committee of the CPSU.

From 1955 to 1962, he was director of the Institute of Philosophy of the Academy of Sciences. From 1959 to 1967, he was Academician-Secretary of the Department of Philosophy and Law (Department of Economic, Philosophical and Legal Sciences) of the Academy of Sciences of the USSR. In 1962–1967 and in 1971–1988, he was vice-president of the Academy of Sciences. From 1967 to 1973, he was director of the Institute of Marxism–Leninism under the Central Committee of the CPSU.

He was one of the academicians of the Academy of Sciences of the USSR who in 1973 signed a letter from scientists to the Pravda newspaper condemning "the behavior of Academician Andrey Sakharov".

He was elected a member of the Central Committee of the Party at the CPSU. He was a deputy of the Supreme Soviet of the Soviet Union of the 6th and 9 convocations. Fedoseyev was Chairman of the Commission for Public Education, Science and Culture of the Council of Nationalities of the 8th and 9th convocations. He was chairman of the Board of the Soviet-Hungarian Friendship Society. He was an honorary member of the Hungarian Academy of Sciences, foreign member of the Bulgarian Academy of Sciences, Academy of Sciences of East Germany and the Czechoslovak Academy of Sciences.

After a fire in the Library of the Academy of Sciences on February 15, 1988, he resigned from the post of vice-president of the academy.

Pyotr Nikolaevich Fedoseyev died on October 18, 1990, and was buried at the Novodevichy Cemetery.

== Scientific activity ==
Fedoseyev's main works are devoted to the subjects of historical materialism, scientific communism, scientific atheism as well as criticism of bourgeois philosophy and sociology. His works has been translated in many different languages, specifically in the former Eastern Bloc.

== Awards ==
- Lenin Prize
- Hero of Socialist Labor
- Four Orders of Lenin
- Order of the October Revolution
- Order of the Patriotic War, 1st class
- Four Orders of the Red Banner of Labor
- Mongolian Order of Sukhbaatar
- K. Marx Gold Medal of the Academy of Sciences of the USSR
