= British Communist Group =

The British Communist Group was a small organization of British residents in Russia. The group was affiliated to the Federation of Foreign Groups of the Russian Communist Party (bolsheviks). The group was represented by Joseph Fineberg at the founding congress of the Communist International in March 1919. Fineberg participated as a consultative delegate.
