= Evald Ilyenkov =

Soviet philosopher (1924–1979)

Evald Vasilievich Ilyenkov
- Born: 18 February 1924; Smolensk, Soviet Union
- Died: 21 March 1979 (aged 55); Moscow, Soviet Union

Philosophical work
- Era: 20th-century philosophy
- Region: Soviet philosophy
- School: Marxism
- Main interests: Dialectics · Epistemology
- Notable ideas: Dialectical logic · Dialectics of the ideal · Dialectics of abstract and concrete

Evald Vasilievich Ilyenkov (Russian: Э́вальд Васи́льевич Илье́нков; 18 February 1924 – 21 March 1979) was a Soviet philosopher.

== Biography ==
=== Early life ===
Evald Ilyenkov was born in to the family of Soviet writer and teacher Vasily Ilyenkov. When he was four years old, the family moved to Moscow. In his youth, Evald became interested in the music of Wagner and the philosophy of Spinoza. He continued his studies at the Institute of Philosophy, Literature and History; but his studies were interrupted by the outbreak of World War II during which he fought in the Red Army as an artillery commander.

After the end of the war, he served as part of the contingent of Soviet troops in Germany until August 1945. After he was demobilized he continued his studies in the Faculty of Philosophy of the Moscow State University and joined the Communist Party in 1950.

=== Conflict at the Moscow State University ===
In April 1954, the theses "On the question of the relationship between philosophy and knowledge about nature and society in the process of their historical development" appeared, the authors of which were Ilyenkov and Valentin Ivanovich Korovikov. In this theses they argued that philosophy cannot solve the problems of special sciences and can only be a theory of knowledge, studying the nature of scientific knowledge. In their opinion, "philosophy is the science of scientific thinking, its laws and forms". In February and March 1955, at the Faculty of Philosophy of the MSU, an inspection was carried out on them by the commission of the department of science and culture of the CPSU Central Committee. In the commission's report, the theses of Ilyenkov and Korovikov were assessed as "a relapse of Menshevik idealism, which was long defeated and condemned by the party” and It was found that “some students and graduate students have a desire to move away from pressing practical problems into the area of "pure science", "pure thinking", divorced from practice, from the politics of our party. Some students admitted that they had not read newspapers for a long time”. After checking the state of affairs at the Faculty of Philosophy of Moscow State University by a commission of the CPSU Central Committee, Ilyenkov’s views were defined as "a perversion of the philosophy of Marxism".

On 25 and 29 March, the Academic Council of the Faculty of Philosophy of Moscow State University was held, at which the theses of Ilyenkov and Korovikov were discussed, as a result they were accused of Hegelianism and were deprived of the right to teach at Moscow State University.

=== Later life and career ===
In November 1953, he was accepted into the sector of dialectical materialism at the Institute of Philosophy of the USSR Academy of Sciences as a junior researcher, and in 1961 Ilyenkov received the position of senior researcher. In the first half of the 1960s, Ilyenkov participated in the creation of the Philosophical Encyclopedia as an author; in the process of working on the second volume, he became the editor of the section "dialectical materialism".

From 1975 until the end of his life, Ilyenkov led a scientific seminar at the Faculty of Psychology of Moscow State University at the invitation of Dean Aleksei Leontiev.

Suffering from depression and alcoholism, Ilyenkov committed suicide on March 21, 1979. He was buried besides his father at the Novodevichy Cemetery.

== Philosophy ==
Evald Ilyenkov did original work on the materialist development of Hegel's dialectics, notable for his account of concrete universals. His works include Dialectical Logic (Russian, 1974; English trans. 1977), Leninist Dialectics and the Metaphysics of Positivism (Russian, 1980 (posthum.); English trans. 1982) and The Dialectics of the Abstract and Concrete in Marx's Capital (Russian, 1960; English trans. 1982).

David Bakhurst wrote in his article; "Meaning, Normativity and the Life of Mind":

Ilyenkov was important in the revival of Russian Marxist philosophy. In the early 1960s, he produced significant work in two main areas. First he wrote at length on Marx's dialectical method ('the method of ascent from the abstract to concrete'). This work, though it now seems obscure, has an important political sub-text: its critique of empiricism is aimed at the positivism and scientism that Ilyenkov thought prevalent in Soviet political and intellectual culture. Second, Ilyenkov developed a distinct solution to what he called 'the problem of the ideal;’ that is, the problem of the place of the non-material in the natural world. The latter involves a resolute defence of the objectivity of ideal phenomena, which are said to exist as aspects of our spiritual culture, embodied in our environment. ... there are important continuities between Ilyenkov’s ideas and controversies in Soviet philosophy and psychology in the 1920s and '30s, particularly ... with Vygotsky's socio-historical psychology... After the insightful writings of the early 1960s, his inspiration diminished as the political climate became more oppressive. ... He died in 1979, by his own hand.

— David Bakhurst, Language and Communication, 17 (1), 33–51

An abridged version of his article, "Marx and the Western World," was published in English in a book of the same name in 1967, but this work is little known.

On the other hand, Ilyenkov's work (especially his masterpiece, the study on Dialectics of the Abstract and the Concrete in Marx's Capital from 1960, and the collection of essays entitled Dialectical Logic from 1974) deeply influenced the reception of Marx' economic writings from the 1960s onwards, in the Soviet Union and the German Democratic Republic (GDR) as well as in the West. His influence can be witnessed in the international research effort concerned with the publication of Marx' economic manuscripts (in Marx/Engels: Gesamtausgabe, or MEGA, section II, 1976 ff.). His influence is also evident in the intense debates on economic reform that was going on in the Soviet Union in the 1970s (e.g., in the works of A. K. Pokrytan).

Ilyenkov's works have been published in about 20 languages. His Dialectical Logic (1974) was published in English by Progress Publishers in Moscow in 1977. A German translation of his Dialectics of the Abstract and the Concrete in Marx’s Capital (1960), was published by the same publisher in 1979 (and simultaneously by Das europäische Buch, West Berlin); an English translation of the book was published by Progress Publishers in Moscow in 1982. Leninist Dialectics and the Metaphysics of Positivism (first published in Russian in 1980) was published by New Park Publications in 1982.

== Bibliography (English translations) ==
Books:

- 2018. Intelligent Materialism: Essays on Hegel and Dialectics
- 1960. Dialectics of the Abstract & the Concrete in Marx’s Capital
- 1974. Dialectical Logic, Essays on its History and Theory
- 1979. Leninist Dialectics and the Metaphysics of Positivism

Articles:

- 1974. Activity and Knowledge
- 1974. From the Marxist-Leninist Point of View
- 1974. The Universal
- 1974. A Contribution to a Conversation About Esthetic Education
- 1975. A Contribution to a Conversation About Meshcheriakov
- 1975. Humanism and Science
- 1976. Dialectics of the Ideal
- 1977. Concept of the Ideal
- 1979. The problem of contradiction in logic (fragment)
- 1979. Materialism Is Militant and Therefore Dialectical
- Date unknown. Psychology
- Date unknown. Our Schools Must Teach How to Think!
- Date unknown. A Contribution to the Discussion on School Education
- Date unknown. On the Nature of Ability
- Date unknown. The Biological and the Social in Man
- Date unknown. A Contribution on the Question of the Concept of “Activity” and Its Significance for Pedagogy
- Date unknown. Knowledge and Thinking
- "Ideals (Social, Esthetic, Moral)". M. E. Sharpe.
- "Mind and Brain (An Answer to D. I. Dubrovskii)". M. E. Sharpe.
- "The Question of the Identity of Thought and Being in Pre-Marxist Philosophy". M. E. Sharpe.

== See also ==
- Philosophy in the Soviet Union
- Aleksandr Zinovyev
- Merab Mamardashvili
- György Lukács
- Lev Vygotsky
- Bertell Ollman
