= Merab Mamardashvili =

Georgian philosopher (1930–1990)

- Born: September 15, 1930; Gori, Georgian SSR, Soviet Union
- Died: November 25, 1990 (aged 60); Moscow, Russian SFSR, Soviet Union

Merab Mamardashvili (Georgian: მერაბ მამარდაშვილი; September 15, 1930 – November 25, 1990) was a Georgian philosopher.

== Biography ==
He was born in Gori (Eastern Georgia). In 1955, he graduated from the Faculty of Philosophy, Moscow State University. From 1968 to 1987, he was a deputy editor of the scientific journal "Voprosy Filosofii" ("Questions of Philosophy"). He became a professor at the Moscow State University and a senior research fellow at the Moscow Institute of Philosophy of the Russian Academy of Science. From 1987 to 1990, Mamardashvili was head of the Department at the Tsereteli Institute of Philosophy, at the Georgian Academy of Sciences and a Professor at the Tbilisi State University.

He died from a heart attack at Moscow Vnukovo airport on November 25, 1990, and was buried in Tbilisi in a family grave, at the Saburtalo cemetery. In May 2001, a monument to him was unveiled in Tbilisi.

== Philosophical work ==
In his life, only a few books were published, his lectures (for his style of lecturing, he and others called them "dialogues" or "conversations", and he was called "Russian (or Georgian) Socrates") were taped and published after his death by his disciple Yuri Senokosov, co-founder with Elena Nemirovskaya of the former Moscow School of Political Studies . Lecturing abroad, Mamardashvili gave talks in Germany, France, and other countries.

Influenced by René Descartes and classical German philosophy (especially Immanuel Kant), Mamardashvili contributed to the rationalist theory of perception. His main research fields were the general gnoseological notion of processes of analysis and synthesis, the methodology of science and the historic-philosophical studies, the role of consciousness in social being, the relationship between consciousness and the aesthetics, and the overall meta-theory of language and consciousness. He considered consciousness the ultimate subject of philosophy. Some of the most famous phrases coined by Mamardashvili are: "consciousness is paradoxicalness impossible to get used to", "consciousness is an experience of inexperiencible experiences", "phenomenology is the accompanying feature of all of philosophy", "loneliness is my profession" and so on.

In the preview to the edition of the major compilation of his works in 2002, he was introduced as "one of the most interesting contemporary philosophers, a man of impeccable style, magical fascination and rare kindness". It was also noted there that all of his interests were concentrated around the human personality, its freedom and responsibility, and the role of philosophy in life and its place in culture.

== Bibliography ==
- The process of analysis and synthesis (1958)("Процессы анализа и синтеза")
- Forms and Contents of Thinking (1968) (Формы и содержание мышления)
- Converted form [1970] ( "Форма превращенная" - article for the Encyclopedia of Philosophy)
- Symbol and Consciousness (Символ и сознание), (1974), together with A. Piatigorsky (published 1982)
- The Problem of Objective Method in Psychology (1977)
- The Arrow of Cognition (1978)
- Classic and Non-classic Ideals of Rationality (1984) (Классические и неклассические идеалы рациональности)
- Phenomenology and its Role in Contemporary Philosophy (1988)
- How Do I Understand Philosophy? (1990) (Как я понимаю философию)
- Kantian Themes (1990) ("Кантианские вариации", published 1991 in the philosophical almanac "Quintessence" p. 120-158)
- Conscious and the Philosophical Calling (1988)
- Cartesian Meditations[1986] (published 1993) (Картезианские размышления)
- Aesthetics of Thinking [1987] (published 1993) ("Эстетика мышления")
- Psychological Topology of Path (Lectures on Proust) [1981] (published 1997) (Психологическая топология пути (Лекции о Прусте))

== Documentaries ==
- Socrates in a duel (dir. Tamara Dularidze)
- Georgian Kant (dir. Olga Rolengoff)
- The way home (dir. Nikolai Drozdov)
- Time of Merab (dir. Olesya Fokina)
- Merab Mamardashvili (dir. Valery Balayan)

== See also ==
- Evald Ilyenkov
- List of Georgians
- Philosophy in the Soviet Union
