= Leonid Stolovich =

Russian-Estonian philosopher

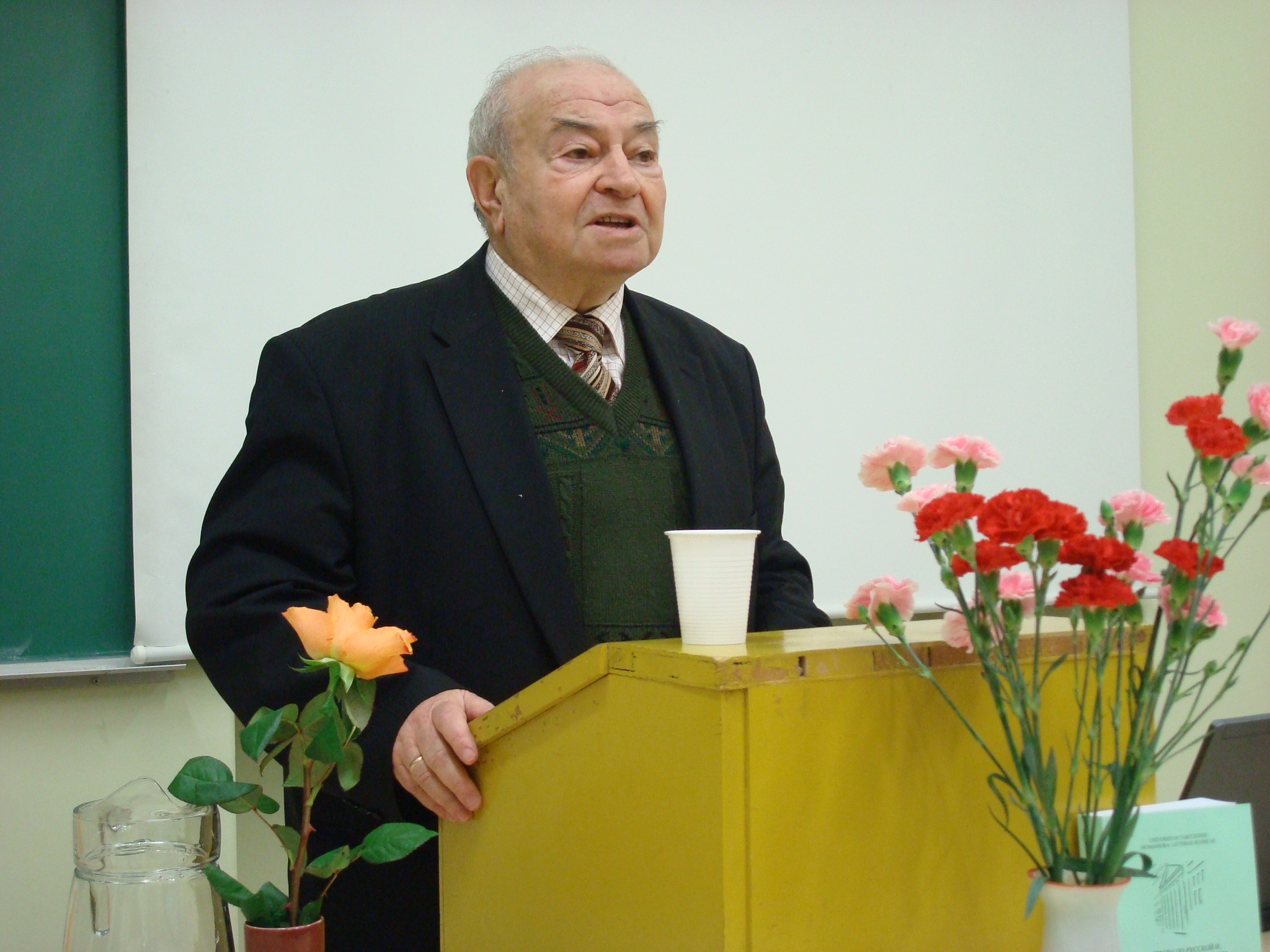
Leonid Stolovich

Leonid Naumovich Stolovich (Russian: Леони́д Нау́мович Столович; Estonian: Leonid Stolovitš; July 22, 1929, in Leningrad – November 4, 2013, in Tartu) was a Russian-Estonian philosopher, Doctor of Philosophy (1966) and professor (1967). Stolovich graduated from the Leningrad University in 1952, from 1953 on he worked at Tartu University, Estonia, from 1994 on as a professor emeritus. Above all, Stolovich studied esthetics: its history, theories of esthetics and axiology. He is the author of more than forty books and 400 publications in 20 languages.

During the Perestroika era, Stolovich took part in the pro-democracy movement (Popular Front of Estonia). Stolovich’s work “Pluralism in the Philosophy…” explores 'systematic pluralism', a term coined by Stolovich, which means the unity of dialectical opposites pluralism and monism.

== See also ==
- Philosophy in the Soviet Union

== Bibliography ==
- Beauty and Society (1969)
- The Essence of Esthetical Quality (1976)
- The Philosophy of Beauty (1980)
- Esthectics, Art, Play (1992)
- Life-Creation-Man: the Function of the Creative Activities (1985) (Жизнь. Творчество. Человек: функции художественной деятельности)
- Beauty.Goodness.Truth. A Study on the History of the Esthetical Axiology (Moscow, 1994) (Красота. Добро. Истина. Очерк истории эстетической аксиологии)
- Pluralism in the Philosophy and the Philosophy of Pluralism (2005)
