= Mikhail Kedrov (politician) =

Personal details
- Born: 12 (24) February 1878 Moscow, Imperial Russia
- Died: 28 October 1941 (aged 63) Kuybyshev Oblast, Soviet Union
- Party: RSDLP (1901–1903); RSDLP (Bolsheviks) (1903–1918); Russian Communist Party (1918–1939)
- Children: Bonifaty

Mikhail Sergeyevich Kedrov (Russian: Михаи́л Сергеевич Кедров; 24 February [O.S. 12 February] 1878 – 28 October 1941) was a Russian Soviet communist politician, an Old Bolshevik revolutionary, secret policeman and head of the military section of the Cheka.

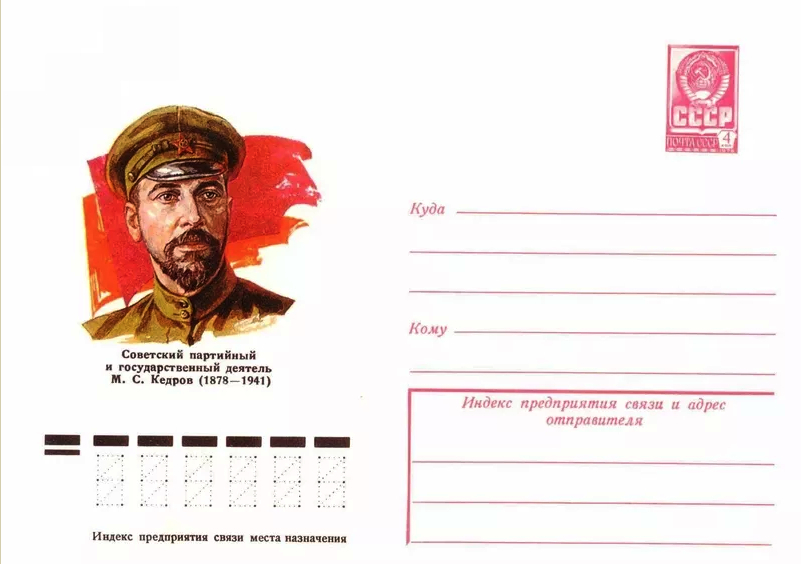
Soviet postal cover featuring portrait of M. S. Kedrov, 1978.

== Early career ==
Mikhail Kedrov was born in Moscow, into a family in the lower ranks of the Russian nobility. He was expelled from Moscow University for his political activity in 1899, without having graduated. He moved to Yaroslavl, where he studied law, joined the Russian Social Democratic Labour Party in 1901, and was arrested and deported to Vologda in 1902. He joined the Bolsheviks, after the split in the RSDLP in 1903, and donated the money he inherited from his father, approximately 100 thousand gold rubles.

During the 1905 Revolution he organised workers' detachments in Kostroma and supplied weapons for the armed rising in Moscow. After defeat of the revolution, he organised distribution of illegal Bolshevik literature, and ran a publishing house in St. Petersburg, until he was arrested. Released after two years in prison, he moved with his family to Switzerland in 1911, and studied at Lausanne and Berne universities.

He returned to Russia in 1916, and was a military doctor in the Caucasus during the final part of the war between Russia and Turkey. At the time of the February Revolution, he was in northern Iran, where he helped organise a short-lived soviet. By the end of March 1917, he was in Petrograd (St Petersburg), where he joined the Bolsheviks' military organisation, and edited Soldatskaya Pravda. After the October Revolution, he became member of the Collegium of the People's Commissariat for War, and Military Commissar for Demobilisation. In May 1918 he was sent to the North as a commissar in the Red Army to organise defence of Vologda against the White army.

== Career in Cheka ==
In September 1918, Kedrov was appointed head of the military section of Cheka, which was renamed the Special Section on 1 January 1919, after a merger with another department. In May 1920, after defeat of the White Army in the north, Kedrov was appointed Cheka plenitpotentiary for the region, which included Arkhangelsk, Vologda, and the Solovetsky Islands, site of one of Russia's oldest monasteries. He ordered the closure of the monastery, expelled the monks, and created the first of the labour camps that formed what later became known as the Gulag. He also set up an extermination camp at Kholmogory, near Arkhangelsk, for the mass executions of former White officers and others suspected of opposing the Bolshevik revolution.

He was reportedly extremely cruel, even by the standards of the Red Terror. Donald Rayfield wrote that Kedrov "slaughter[ed] schoolchildren and Army officers in northern Russia with such ruthlessness that he had to be taken into psychiatric care." Kedrov reportedly executed captured White Russian officers by loading them onto barges and sinking them. He was ultimately relieved of his post after preparing to massacre the population of Vologda. On 5 April 1921, the chairman of the Arkhangelsk regional Cheka, Zinovi Katsnelson, reported to his superiors that:

The Kholmogory camp was organized by Kedrov, I repeat Kedrov, secretly, and exclusively for the mass liquidation of the white officers ... No prisoners were held there. They were brought only for liquidation.

The number put to death during the reprisals overseen by Kedrov is estimated at many thousands.

== Later career ==
Kedrov's career as a leading Chekist ended suddenly in 1921, when he was taken ill, and may have been temporarily confined to a psychiatric institution. After his discharge, he was posted to the Caspian Sea, where, along with running the local branch of Cheka, he was given charge of the fishing industry. From 1924, he held relatively minor economic posts, except in 1927–31, when he ran Red Sport International. In 1934, he was appointed director of the military sanitary institute.

== Family ==
Kedrov's wife, Olga Didrikil, was one of three sisters, all with links to the Bolsheviks. Nina Didrikil married Nikolai Podvoisky, who played a pivotal role in the October Revolution. Olga's other sister, Augusta, was the mother of the chekist, Artur Artuzov.

The Kedrovs had three sons. One, Bonifaty, achieved distinction as an academic. Another, Yury, took his own life when a teenager. The third son, Igor, was a Chekist, who was "one of the most vicious of the interrogators" who prepared the great Moscow show trials of 1936 and 1937, by forcing confessions out of old Bolsheviks such as Grigori Zinoviev and Karl Radek. In a tribute to father and son, published in Pravda, Igor was described as a handsome, intelligent youth who loved music, but Elizabeth Poretsky, widow of a murdered agent Ignace Reiss remembered him as a "pimpled youth with a stupid expression", and a fellow NKVD officer, Alexander Orlov believed that he and his father were both mentally ill.

He later remarried. His second wife, Rebekka Plastinina, assisted him in conducting the mass executions in 1920 in the northern region, where she was known as the 'female executioner'.

== Arrest and Execution ==
In February or March of 1939, Mikhail and Igor Kedrov jointly signed a letter to Stalin, denouncing Lavrentiy Beria, the recently appointed head of the NKVD. The older Kedrov had reputedly conducted an investigation in the Azerbaijan branch of Cheka in 1921, and had concluded that Beria was a British agent – a charge that was revived after Beria's arrest, years later. Igor Kedrov was arrested, and shot in January 1940. Mikhail Kedrov was arrested in April 1939. From prison, he wrote a letter to the Politburo member, Andrei Andreyev:

I am calling to you for help from a gloomy cell of the Lefortovo prison. Let my cry of horror reach your ears; do not remain deaf, take me under your protection; please, help remove the nightmare of interrogations and show that this is all a mistake.

I suffer innocently. Please believe me. Time will testify to the truth. I am not an agent provocateur of the Tsarist Okhrana. I am not a spy, I am not a member of an anti-Soviet organization of which I am being accused on the basis of denunciations. I am also not guilty of any other crimes against the Party and the Government. I am an old Bolshevik, free of any stain; I have honestly fought for almost 40 years in the ranks of the Party for the good and prosperity of the nation....

Today I, a 62-year-old man, am being threatened by the investigative judges with more severe, cruel and degrading methods of physical pressure. They (the judges) are no longer capable of becoming aware of their error and of recognizing that their handling of my case is illegal and impermissible. They try to justify their actions by picturing me as a hardened and raving enemy and are demanding increased repressions. But let the Party know that I am innocent and that there is nothing which can turn a loyal son of the Party into an enemy, even right up to his last dying breath. But I have no way out. I cannot divert from myself the hastily approaching new and powerful blows.

Everything, however, has its limits. My torture has reached the extreme. My health is broken, my strength and my energy are waning, the end is drawing near. To die in a Soviet prison, branded as a vile traitor to the Fatherland – what can be more monstrous for an honest man? And how monstrous all this is! Unsurpassed bitterness and pain grips my heart. No! No! This will not happen; this cannot be, I cry. Neither the Party, nor the Soviet Government, nor the People’s Commissar, L. P. Beria, will permit this cruel, irreparable injustice. I am firmly certain that, given a quiet, objective examination, without any foul rantings, without any anger and without the fearful tortures, it would be easy to prove the baselessness of the charges. I believe deeply that truth and justice will triumph. I believe. I believe.

Brought in front of a Military Collegium he was – very unusually – acquitted, but was still in custody after the German invasion of the USSR. He was evacuated from Moscow on Beria's instructions, and taken with other prisoners to a village in Kuibyshev (Samara), and shot on 28 October 1941.

== Posthumous reputation ==
Soviet leader Nikita Khrushchev had decided to denounce crimes committed by the secret police during Stalin's time, but needed to retain the support of Cheka's successor organisation, the KGB. Khrushchev had ordered the execution of Beria, and therefore had a motive for stressing Beria's role in the repression. Kedrov consequently suited his purpose, as a former Chekist who was not implicated in the purges of the 1930s and whose murder could be attributed to Beria personally.

The extract from Kedrov's letter to Andreyev, quoted above, was read out by Khrushchev during his famous Secret Speech to the 20th Party Congress of the Soviet communist party in 1956. Khrushchev's renewed campaign against the neo-Stalinists was accompanied by a detailed account of Kedrov's and Beria's mutual enmity, in Leningradskaya Pravda, 25 February 1964. He was profiled again in Izvestya, 7 November 1970, and there was a 90th birthday tribute in Pravda 24 February 1978, when postage stamps were issued in his honour. Streets were named after him in Arkhangelsk, Moscow and Kotlas. A whole page of Pravda was devoted to Mikhail and Igor Kedrov, 17 February 1989.

A petition calling for Kedrov Street in Arkhangelsk to be renamed was blocked by the authorities in 2016.)

== Honours and awards ==
Order of the Red Banner
