= Pavel Kopnin =

Soviet philosopher

- Born: Pavel Vasilyevich Kopnin; 27 January 1922; Gzhel, RSFSR, Soviet Union
- Died: 27 June 1971 (aged 49); Moscow, Soviet Union
- Awards: Order of the Red Banner of Labour Order of the Badge of Honour

Education
- Education: Moscow State University

Philosophical work
- Era: Contemporary philosophy
- Region: Soviet philosophy
- School: Marxism
- Main interests: Epistemology, dialectical materialism, methodology

Pavel Vasilyevich Kopnin (Russian: Павел Васильевич Копнин; 27 January 1922 – 27 June 1971) was a Soviet philosopher, epistemologist, corresponding member of the Academy of Sciences of the Soviet Union and an Academician of the Academy of Sciences of the Ukrainian SSR.

== Biography ==
Born in to the family of a railroad worker, Kopnin studied and the Faculty of Philosophy of the Moscow State University. He was enlisted in the Red Army during the Second World War and joined the Communist Party of the Soviet Union in 1943.

After the war, he entered and then graduated at the Moscow State Pedagogical University in 1947 with a PhD.

He worked at the Academy of Social Sciences under the Central Committee of the CPSU. From 1947 to 1955, he served as an associate professor, head of the department of Tomsk University.

From 1958, he worked in Ukraine. Kopnin headed the Department of Philosophy at the Kyiv Polytechnic Institute, and then the Department of Dialectical and Historical Materialism at Kyiv State University from 1959 to 1961.

From 1962 to 1968, he was the director of the Institute of Philosophy of the Academy of Sciences of the Ukrainian SSR and since 1968 he was the director of the Institute of Philosophy of the Academy of Sciences of the Soviet Union. He taught as a professor at the Department of Dialectical Materialism at the Philosophical Faculty of Moscow State University.

Kopnin was member of the editorial boards of the Philosophical Encyclopedia (1961–1970) and the journal Voprosy filosofii (1963–1971). From 1963, he was a member of the Executive Committee of the International Federation of Philosophical Societies.

Pavel Kopnin died on 27 June 1971, and was buried at the Novodevichy Cemetery.

== Fields of research ==
Kopnin was an author of scientific works on dialectical materialism, the theory of knowledge, methodology and the logic of science. He was one of the initiators of the development of the logic of scientific research in the Soviet Union.

Kopnin carried out work on the analysis of the logical and methodological foundations of modern science, made an attempt at dialectical-materialistic generalization of certain areas of specific methodological knowledge, investigated the logical functions of dialectics, highlighted the concept of the coincidence of dialectics, logic and the theory of knowledge. He implemented a ramified typology of forms of thinking, forms of cognition and forms of systematization of scientific knowledge, made significant clarifications in understanding the relationship between sensory and rational, theoretical and empirical. He was accused of revisionism, anthropologism many times by the Soviet authorities.

Throughout his life, Kopnin was engaged in the study of fundamental philosophical issues of the development of science - from the study of methodological and logical-epistemological problems of individual branches of natural science to problems uniting several areas (physics, biology, cybernetics), as well as those problems that arise in interdisciplinary knowledge.
