= Fyodor Konstantinov =

Soviet philosopher (1901–1991)

- Born: Fyodor Vasilyevich Konstantinov; February 21, 1901; Novosyolki, Arzamassky Uyezd, Nizhny Novgorod Governorate, Russian Empire
- Died: December 8, 1991 (aged 90); Moscow, Soviet Union
- Occupation: Philosopher

Fyodor Vasilyevich Konstantinov (Russian: Фёдор Васи́льевич Константи́нов; 21 February 1901 – 8 December 1991) was a Soviet Marxist–Leninist philosopher and academician.

== Career ==
Born in to a peasant family, he joined the Red Army after the October Revolution and became a participant of the Civil War in Siberia.

After becoming a member of the Communist Party in 1918, he graduated from the Institute of Red Professors in 1932 and earned his PhD in Philosophy in 1935.

During his career he served as an academic secretary of the Institute of Philosophy of the Communist Academy, Professor of Propaganda of the Central Committee, and deputy director of the Institute of Philosophy of the Academy of Sciences of the Soviet Union. He was editor-in-chief of Problems of Philosophy (1952–54) and Кommunist (1958–62). He also acted as head of the Propaganda Department of the CC of the CPSU (Отделом пропаганды и агитации ЦК КПСС, 1955–58). He was a main author of the historical materialism (Историч материализм, 1951) and the Fundamentals of Marxist Philosophy (Основы марксистской философии, 1958), and chief editor of the Philosophical Encyclopedia (volumes 1–3, 1960–64).

He served as director of the Institute of Philosophy of the Academy of Sciences of the Soviet Union (1962–67). He was the founder and president of the Philosophical Society of the USSR (Философского общества СССР, 1971).
