= Kaplino =

Kaplino Каплино
- Selo
- Location within Belgorod Oblast Location within Russia
- Coordinates: 51°21′N 37°49′E
- Country: Russia
- Region: Belgorod Oblast
- District: Starooskolsky District
- Time zone: UTC+3:00

Kaplino (Russian: Каплино) is a rural locality (a selo) in Starooskolsky District, Belgorod Oblast, Russia. The population was 1,229 as of 2010. There are 43 streets.

== Geography ==
Kaplino is located 11 km north of Stary Oskol (the district's administrative centre) by road. Fedoseyevka is the nearest rural locality.
