= Sholom Dvolaitsky =

Russian economist

- Шолом Дволайцкий
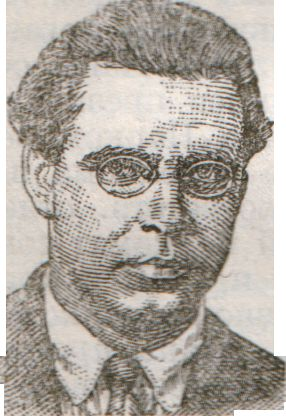
- Born: 1893; Zhagare, Kovno Governorate, Russian Empire
- Died: 27 November 1937 (aged 43–44)
- Cause of death: Execution
- Burial place: Common Grave №1
- Education: University of Yuryev
- Political party: VKP(b)
- Other political affiliations: RSDLP(i)

Sholom Moiseevich Dvolaitsky (Russian: Шолом Моисеевич Дволайцкий, S. M. Dvolaitsky; 1893–27 November, 1937) was a Soviet economist and state official.

== Biography ==
Dvolajckij was born in Zhagare, (Note: Today Žagarė, Lithuania) Kovno Governorate in the Russian Empire.

He collaborated with Alexander Bogdanov in producing the 10th revised edition of Kratkii kurs ekonomicheskoi nauki (1920) which appeared in an English translation by Joe Fineberg as A Short Course in Economic Science (1923).

However Bogdanov was to criticise Dvolaitsky's view that the method of Karl Marx’s Das Kapital was not applicable to the analysis of non-capitalist social-economic formations.

In 1928, his Ćastnyj kapital v torgovle SSSR was published in Russia.

In 1934 his translation of a chapter of Rosa Luxemburg's The Accumulation of Capital was published in Moscow: Tugan-Baranovsky

He was director of the Department of Culture and Propaganda of the Azov-Black Sea Territorial Committee of the All-Union Communist Party (bolsheviks) from 1936–7 when he was purged. He was arrested on 15 October 1937 and tried and shot on 27 November 1937. His ashes are buried in the Donskoye Cemetery
