= Arkady Timiryasev =

Russian physicist and philosopher

- Аркадий Тимирязев
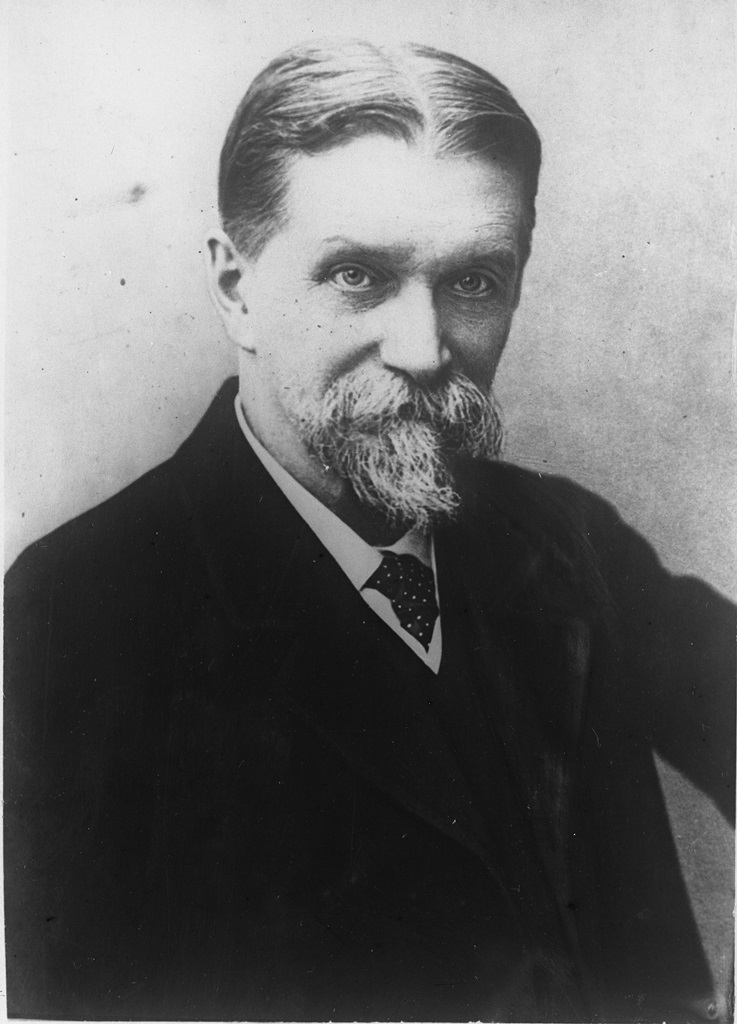
- Arkady Timiryasev
- Born: 19 October 1880; Moscow Russian Empire
- Died: 15 November 1955 (aged 75); Moscow, Russian Soviet Federative Socialist Republic
- Known for: Denying Albert Einstein's Theory of relativity and quantum mechanics
- Title: Professor; Academician of the Academy of Sciences of the Soviet Union
- Parent: Kliment Timiryazev
- Awards: Order of the Badge of Honour

Academic background
- Education: Imperial Moscow University
- Doctoral advisor: Aleksandr Stoletov; Pyotr Lebedev

Academic work
- Discipline: Statistical physics
- Institutions: Moscow State University; Academy of Sciences of the Soviet Union

Arkady Klimentievich Timiryazev (Russian: Аркадий Климентьевич Тимирязев; 19 October 1880 — 15 November 1955) was a Russian Marxist physicist and philosopher.

== Biography ==
Arkady was the son of the prominent agronomist and biologist Kliment Timiryazev. He was closely associated with Maxim Gorky. Although he was deemed a professor of physics at Moscow State University, he was derided as the "monument's son" by people who questioned his competence. He was an ardent defender of the classical physics propounded by Isaac Newton and was particularly noted for his vitriolic denunciations of Albert Einstein. He used his Bolshevik ideology to attack other Soviet physicists such as Abram Ioffe and Sergei Vavilov. However he gained acceptance from Joseph Stalin, whose works he scoured for references to physics, which he would then cite.

He wrote "Albert Einstein: Relativity: The Special and General Theory" which appeared in 1922 in the first issue of Under the Banner of Marxism (UBM). This was a review of the Russian translation of Einstein's 1916 book Über die spezielle und die allgemeine Relativitätstheorie. Here Timiryasev argued that:

"All conclusions from Einstein’s theory, which are consistent with reality, can be obtained and often obtained in a much simpler way using theories that contain absolutely nothing incomprehensible – nothing that is at all similar to the requirements presented by Einstein’s theory."

Sixteen years later he wrote "The Theory of Relativity as a Source of Philosophical Idealism" which also appeared in UBM in 1938. Here he stated:

"The orthodox modern scientist does not dare to doubt Einstein's theory. For he regards it as an absolute truth. He holds definitely the view that the Copernican and the Ptolemaic systems are one and the same thing. This standpoint is inacceptable for everybody who does not succumb to fashion in science. The identification of the Ptolemaic and the Copernican system is not a conclusion that has been drawn by idealistic philosophers from the theory of relativity. This identification is the starting point of the whole Einsteinian theory. This theory has this starting point in common with Mach who chose it under the influence of his reactionary philosophy."
