= Problems of Philosophy (magazine) =

Voprosy filosofii (Problems of Philosophy)
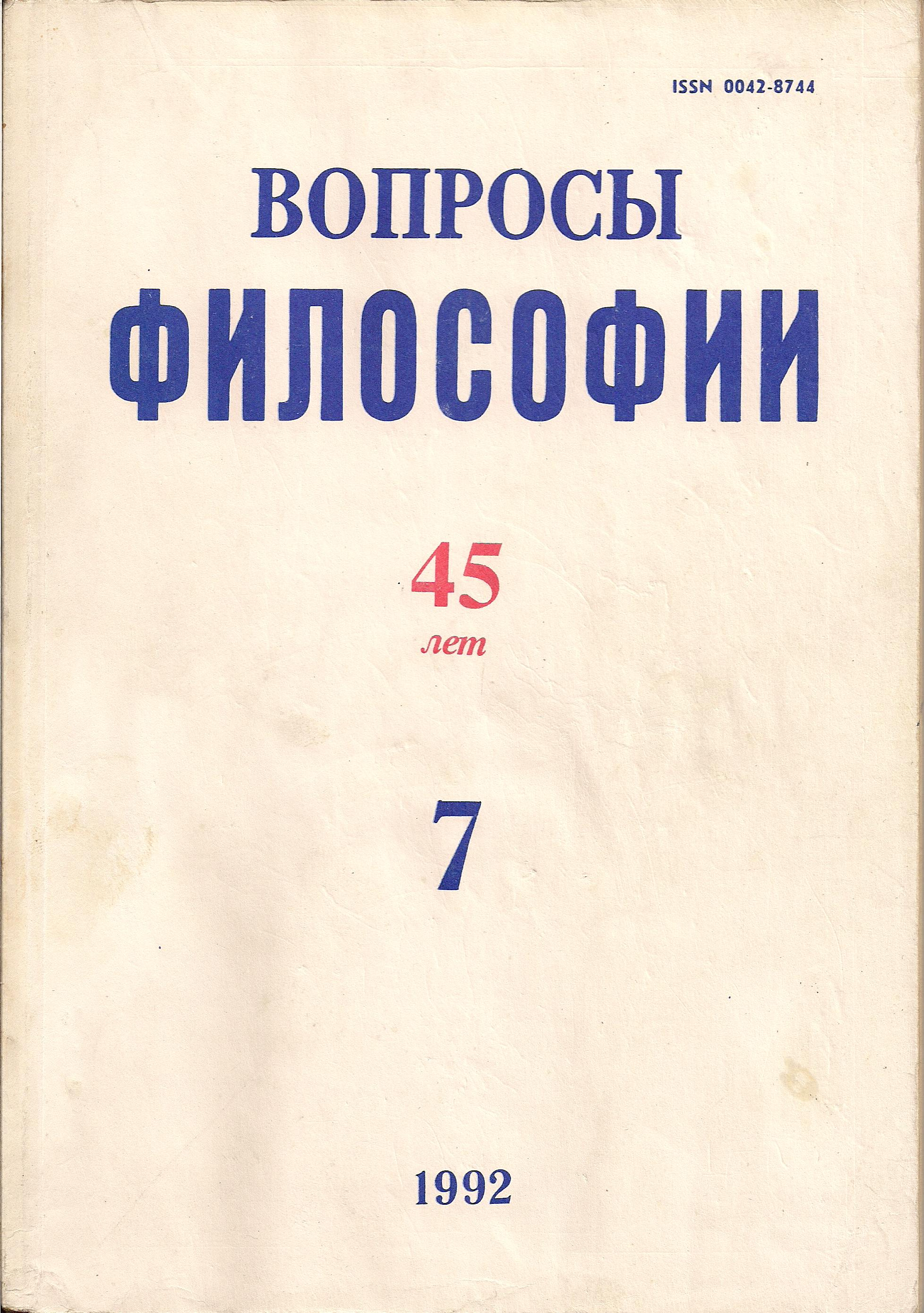
- Language: Russian
- Edited by: Boris Pruzhinin

Publication details
- History: 1947–present
- Publisher: Russian Academy of Sciences (Soviet Union/Russia)

Standard abbreviations
- ISO 4: Vopr. Filos.

Indexing
- ISSN: 0042-8744
- LCCN: 51016068
- OCLC no.: 429157875

Links
- Journal homepage

Voprosy Filosofii (Russian: Вопросы философии, Problems of Philosophy) is a Soviet and Russian scientific and theoretical philosophical peer-reviewed academic journal. It was established in July 1947 under the guidance of the Presidium of the Russian Academy of Sciences. Bonifaty Kedrov was one of its initiators and held the position of editor in chief from 1947 to 1949.

== History ==
The publication is considered the successor of the magazine Under the Banner of Marxism which was published in Moscow from 1922 to 1944.

The magazine was created on the initiative of the prominent Soviet statesman and ideologue Andrei Zhdanov in 1947. Periodicity of the magazine was initially three times a year, from 1951 it was 6 times a year, and from 1958 it was published monthly.

Circulation in 1971 was about forty thousand copies; and recently In 2007 it was about three thousand copies. In Soviet times, the magazine had the largest circulation among philosophical magazines in the world. Since 1989, Pravda Publishing House has been publishing a book series, On the History of Domestic Philosophical Thought, as a supplement to the magazine.

== Discussion of cybernetics ==
"Whom Does Cybernetics Serve?" was an anonymous article from "Materialist" which appeared in No. 5, 1953, (pp. 210–219). They attacked cybernetics as a "misanthropic pseudotheory", "a sterile flower on the tree of knowledge generated as a result of the one-sided and unbounded exaggeration of one of the demons of knowledge." Two years later the magazine published "The Main Features of Cybernetics" by Sergei Sobolev, Alexey Lyapunov and Anatoly Kitov which defended cybernetics against the unwarranted criticism by philosophers of what they regarded as a bono-fide science.

== Chief editors ==
Chief Editor	Years
Bonifaty Kedrov	1947–1949
Dmitry Chesnokov	1949–1952
F. V. Konstantinov	1952–1954
Mikhail Kammari	1954—1959
A. F. Okulov	1959–1960
Mark Mitin	1960–1967
Ivan Frolov	1968–1977
Vadim S. Semenov	1977–1987
V. A. Lektorsky	1988–2009
Boris Pruzhinin	since 2009

== Literature ==
- Avner Zis У истоков журнала «Вопросы философии» // Вопросы философии. — 1997. — № 7. — С. 44—53.
- Zahar Kamensky Утраченные иллюзии (Воспоминания о начале издания «Вопросов философии») // Вопросы философии. — 1997. — № 7. — С. 21—28.
- Lektorsky V. «Вопросы философии» за 60 лет // Вопросы философии. — 2007. — № 7.
- Potkov L. Некоторые эпизоды из жизни журнала в 1947—1949 годах // Вопросы философии. — 1997. — № 7. — С. 29—33.
- Vadim Sadowski «Вопросы философии» в шестидесятые годы // Вопросы философии. — 1997. — № 8. — С. 33—46.
