= Nadezhda Peshkova =

Russian artist

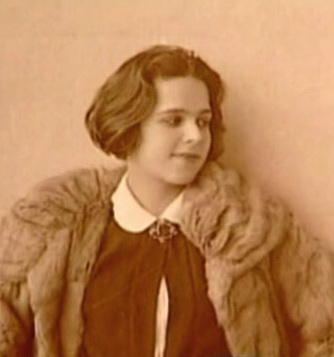
- Portrait of Timosha, c. 1920s
- Born: Nadezhda Alekseevna Vvedenskaya; 30 November 1901; Tomsk, Tomsk Governorate, Russian Empire
- Died: 10 January 1971 (aged 69); Moscow, Russian SFSR, Soviet Union
- Spouse: Maxim Peshkov (died 1934)
- Children: 2
- Father: Alexei Vvedensky
- Relatives: Yekaterina Peshkova (mother-in-law)

Nadezhda Alekseevna Peshkova (née Vvedenskaya; nicknamed "Timosha"; November 30, 1901 – January 10, 1971) was a Russian painter.

She was born, Tomsk, and married Maxim Peshkov, the son of Maxim Gorky. She learned about painting while staying at Gorky's house in Capri in the 1920s. Here she was taught by Pavel Korin, who also later painted her portrait.

She remained living in Gorky's house following his death and participated in turning it into the Maxim Gorky Apartment Museum in 1965. She died in Moscow.
