= Lyubov Axelrod =

Russian philosopher (1868–1946)

- Любо́вь Аксельро́д
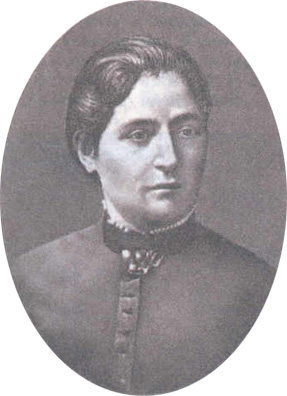
- Portrait of Axelrod, 1887. From a later publication by OBPKiS
- Born: Esther Axelrod; 1868; Vilenkovichi, Vilna Governorate, Russian Empire
- Died: 5 February 1946 (aged 77–78); Moscow, Russian SFSR, Soviet Union
- Resting place: Donskoye Cemetery
- Other name: Orthodox
- Board member of: Iskra; Zarya; Delo

Academic background
- Education: University of Bern
- Thesis: (1900)
- Influences: Georgi Plekhanov

Academic work
- Discipline: Philosophy and history
- Sub-discipline: Marxist philosophy and literary history
- Institutions: IKP; Institute of Scientific Philosophy; Sverdlov Communist University
- Notable works: Against Idealism
- Political party: RSDLP
- Other political affiliations: Yedinstvos; Mensheviks; Bolsheviks; Emancipation of Labour

Lyubov Isaakovna Axelrod (born Esther Axelrod, Russian: Любо́вь (Эстер) Исаа́ковна Аксельро́д, penname: Orthodox, Russian: Ортодо́кс; 1868 – 5 February 1946) was a Russian revolutionary, Marxist philosopher, literary critic and an art theoretician.

== Early life ==
Axelrod was born in the family of a rabbi in Vilenkovichi, a village in the Vilna Governorate of the Russian Empire, now in Pastavy Raion, Belarus. She became involved with the narodnik organization at age 16. She emigrated to Switzerland in 1887, with the assistance of Leo Jogiches (lover of Rosa Luxemburg) when the Vitebsk organisation collapsed in the wake of an unsuccessful attempt to assassinate Alexander III of Russia organised by Aleksandr Ulyanov, older brother of Vladimir Lenin.

== Political career ==
=== 1892 to 1918 ===
In 1892 she became a Marxist and joined the Geneva-based Emancipation of Labor group, becoming a close associate of its leader Georgi Plekhanov. In 1900, she received her Ph.D. in philosophy from Bern University. In 1902 she worked with Plekhanov and Lenin on the newspaper Iskra, as a contributor and an organiser. When the Russian Social Democratic Labor Party split into Bolsheviks and Mensheviks at its Second Congress in 1903, she joined the Bolsheviks, but split with them soon afterwards, at the same time as Plekhanov.

In 1906 Axelrod returned to Russia during an amnesty and became a leading Russian authority on Marxist philosophy, second only to Plekhanov, as well as working with the Mensheviks' illegal organisation. Her Philosophical Essays, published in 1906, were acknowledged by both the Bolsheviks and Mensheviks as the definitive rebuttal of the 'neo-Kantians' Nikolai Berdyaev and Pyotr Struve, former Marxists who had broken with the revolutionaries. She was critical both of Alexander Bogdanov and of Lenin during their debate over Empiriocriticism in 1908–1909, branding their ideas as anti-Marxist. In 1910, in Saint Petersburg, she joined the Central Trade Union Bureau, which was also illegal. After the outbreak of war in 1914, like Plekhanov, she argued that Germany was the aggressor and that Russia had a right to defend itself. She teamed up with two other prominent Marxist 'defencists', Pyotr Maslov and Aleksandr Potresov to produce the fortnightly journal Delo (transl. The Cause). After the February Revolution of 1917 she joined the central committee of the Menshevik party, and following the October Revolution of November 1917 she was reunited with Plekhanov in the small anti-Bolshevik group Yedinstvo. She abstained from party politics after the May 1918 death of Plekhanov, and made it her life's work to defend his philosophy.

=== Later career ===
In the 1920s she first worked at the Institute of Red Professors and later at the Institute of Scientific Philosophy. Her appointment to lecture in philosophy at Sverdlov Communist University, in 1921, was originally blocked by the Orgburo, but when Lenin was consulted he said that it should be allowed, on condition that she was kept under observation in case she started promoting Menshevism. In the 1930s her version of Marxism was officially denounced as a "Mechanistic revision of Marxism" and she faded into obscurity.

She died on 5 February 1946 in Moscow.

== Published works ==
- Against Idealism (1922)
- Marx as a Philosopher (1925)
- Critique of the Foundations of Bourgeois Sociology and Historical Materialism (1925)
- The Idealist Dialectic of Hegel and the Materialist Dialectic of Marx (1934)
