= Abram Deborin =

Soviet philosopher (1881–1963)

- Абра́м Дебо́рин
- Born: Abram Moiseyevich Ioffe; 16 June 1881; Upyna, Kovno Governorate, Russian Empire
- Died: 8 March 1963 (aged 81); Moscow, Russian SFSR, Soviet Union
- Other name: Abraomas Deborinas
- Occupations: Locksmith; philosopher
- Awards: Order of the Red Banner of Labour; Medal "For Valiant Labour in the Great Patriotic War 1941–1945"

Academic background
- Education: University of Bern
- Influences: Georgi Plekhanov; Ivan Luppol

Academic work
- Discipline: Philosophy
- Sub-discipline: Marxist philosophy
- Main interests: Russian Machism

Abram Moiseyevich Deborin (Ioffe) (Russian: Абра́м Моисе́евич Дебо́рин (Ио́ффе); 16 June [O.S. 4 June] 1881, Upyna, Raseiniai uezd, Kovno Governorate – 8 March 1963, Moscow) was a Soviet Marxist philosopher and academician of the Academy of Sciences of the Soviet Union (1929). Deborin oscillated between The Bolshevik and Menshevik factions of the Russian Social Democratic Labour Party, before settling with the Bolsheviks and enjoying a long career as a philosopher in the Soviet Union. Although this career suffered under Stalin, he lived to see his works republished when the Soviet Union was led by Nikita Khrushchev.

== Before the Russian Revolution ==
Entering the revolutionary movement by the end of the 1890s, Deborin joined the Bolshevik faction of the Russian Social Democratic Labour Party in 1903. By 1907, however, he switched to the Menshevik faction and became known as one of Georgi Plekhanov's disciples, both in politics and philosophy. In 1908, Deborin graduated from the philosophy department at Bern University ( Lyubov Axelrod had received her doctorate there in 1900). He soon began publishing major books and articles on philosophy from a Marxist perspective. He then wrote "Filosofiia Makha" (Machist Philosophy), published in Golos sotsialdemokrata, in April 1908. Here he characterized Bolshevism as a political manifestation of the 'subjectivism' and 'voluntarism' inherent in Machism, and that their "tacticians and practical people" were unwitting Machists and idealists. Lenin was one of the practical people who despite his rejection of "machism" had abided by a truce within the Bolshevik faction whereby they agreed not to politicize such philosophical issues.

== After the Russian Revolution ==
Soon after the October Revolution of 1917, Deborin left the Mensheviks and began lecturing at the Sverdlov Communist University, the Institute of Red Professors and the Institute of Philosophy. He soon assumed editorial duties at the journal, Under the Banner of Marxism, which he headed from 1926-1931. Deborin joined the Communist Party in 1928. Following the 1917 October Revolution, Soviet philosophy found itself divided itself between two factions: the "dialecticians," headed up by Deborin, and "mechanists," whose leading figure was the philosopher Lyubov Axelrod (the then prominent Bolshevik leader Nikolai Bukharin was seen as an ally of the "mechanists," although he did not entirely agree with them).

== Under Stalin ==
In 1931, Joseph Stalin decided the issue of the debate between dialecticians and mechanists by publishing a decree which identified dialectical materialism as pertaining solely to Marxism–Leninism. He then codified it in Dialectical and Historical Materialism (1938) by enumerating the "laws of dialectics", which are the grounds of particular disciplines and in particular of the science of history, and which guarantees their conformity to the "proletarian conception of the world". Thus, diamat was imposed on most Communist parties affiliated to the Third International. Dialectical materialism (diamat) became the official philosophy of the Soviet Union and remained as such until its dissolution. When Stalin decided in favor of dialectical materialism, Deborin made a show of support for Stalin's position. However he dared to propose himself to Stalin as a theoretical sidekick, akin to Engels with Marx. At that moment Stalin was already declared to be "the great theoretician of Marxism", and Deborin with "Deborinites" were suppressed for "Menshevizing idealism": overpraising the idealist Hegel while undervaluing Lenin as a philosopher. For some years afterwards, Deborin kept a low profile, and most of his writings were suppressed. However, he lived long enough to see all of his works republished in the Soviet Union during the "Khrushchev Thaw".
