= Bonifaty Kedrov =

Bonifaty Mikhailovich Kedrov (Russian: Бонифа́тий Миха́йлович Ке́дров; 10 December [O.S. 27 November] 1903 in Yaroslavl – 10 September 1985 in Moscow) was a Soviet researcher, philosopher, logician, chemist and psychologist who was a specialist in the philosophy of dialectical materialism and the philosophy of science.

Son of the Bolshevik leader Mikhail Kedrov, he himself joined the Bolsheviks in 1918.

Kedrov had a Doctor of Philosophy degree and specialized in philosophical questions of the natural sciences. He was a member of the Academy of Sciences of the Soviet Union since 1966, author of over one thousand publications.

Since 1963, Kedrov was a member of the International Academy of the History of Science and a number of other institutions. Kedrov was one of the initiators and the first editor-in-chief of Problems of Philosophy (Voprosy Filosofii), a leading Soviet journal of philosophy, from 1947 to 1949.

== Publications ==
- The Science (1968) in association with Alexander Spirkin

Preceded by Mikhail Iovchuk	Editor-in-Chief of the Voprosy Filosofii; 1947—1949	Succeeded by Dmitry Chesnokov
