= Institute of Philosophy, Russian Academy of Sciences =

Russian research institute

Institute of Philosophy of RAS
- Институт философии РАН
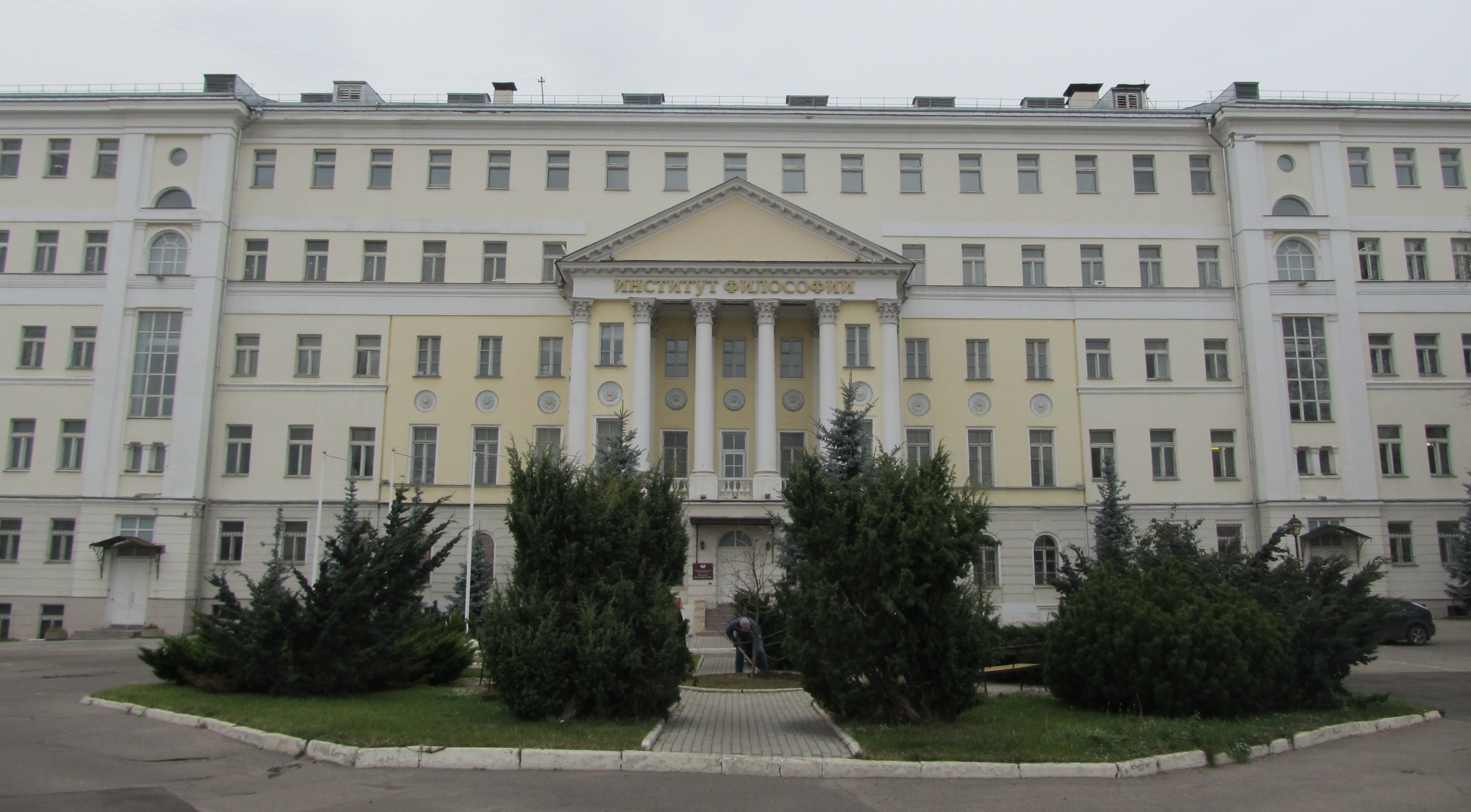
- Established: 1929
- Field of research: Philosophy
- Director: A. A. Guseinov (acting)
- Location: Moscow, Russia
- Affiliations: Russian Academy of Sciences
- Website: https://eng.iph.ras.ru/

The Institute of Philosophy of the Russian Academy of Sciences (Russian: Институт философии РАН) is the central research institution of Russia which conducts scientific work in the main areas and topical issues of modern philosophical knowledge.

== History ==
It was founded as the Institute of Scientific Philosophy in 1921 by Gustav Shpet, who was its first director until 1923. The philosophy department of the University of Moscow had been disbanded in the summer of 1921, however philosophers such as Semyon Frank and Ivan Ilyin attempted to set up temporary courses at the new institute. However, the Bolsheviks soon put a stop to this and Frank and Ilyin where amongst the deportees sent into exile on the philosophers' ships. Shpet's name was put forward for deportation but Anatoli Lunacharsky, the People's Commissar for Education, intervened and he was allowed to remain in Russia.

The Institute of Scientific Philosophy was reassigned and became part of the created Russian Association of Research Institutes for Social Sciences (RANION). In 1927 a Philosophical Department was opened at the Communist Academy. On November 23, 1928, the actual unification of the philosophical section of the Communist Academy and the Institute of Scientific Philosophy headed by Abram Deborin.

On April 12, 1929 by the decree of the Presidium of the Central Executive Committee of the Soviet Union, the merger of the section and the institute, an independent Institute of Philosophy of the Communist Academy was created, headed by Abram Deborin; at the same time, the Institute of Scientific Philosophy continued to operate in the RANION system, which was assigned the execution of an educational function the training of scientific personnel.

In 1936 reform and unification of the Communist Academy and the Academy of Sciences of the USSR ( USSR Academy of Sciences): liquidation of the Communist Academy as an independent organization and its absorption by the structures of the Academy of Sciences of the Soviet Union; the incorporation of the Institute of Philosophy into the system of the Academy of Sciences of the Soviet Union: on the basis of the Institute of Philosophy of the Communist Academy, the Institute of Philosophy of the Academy of Sciences of the Soviet Union was created, headed by Vladimir Adoratsky.

After the dissolution of the Soviet Union, since the end of 1991, the institution has been part of the system of the Russian Academy of Sciences.

== Directors ==
| Years | Director |
|---|---|
| September 1921 – March 1923 | Gustav G. Shpet |
| March 1923 – 1924 | Vladimir I. Nevsky (actual leader - deputy director Yakov A. Berman ) |
| 1924–1931 | acad. Abram M. Deborin |
| 1931–1938 | acad. Vladimir V. Adoratsky |
| 1939–1944 | acad. Pavel F. Yudin |
| 1944–1946 | Doctor of Philosophy V. I. Svetlov |
| 1946–1947 | Doctor of Philosophy G. S. Vasetsky |
| 1947–1954 | acad. Georgy F. Aleksandrov |
| 1955–1962 | acad. Pyotr N. Fedoseev |
| 1962–1967 | acad. Fedor V. Konstantinov |
| 1968–1971 | Corresponding Member USSR Academy of Sciences Pavel V. Kopnin |
| 1971–1973 | Doctor of Philosophy F. T. Arkhiptsev (acting) |
| 1973–1974 | acad. Bonifaty M. Kedrov |
| 1974–1983 | Doctor of Philosophy B. S. Ukraintsev |
| 1983—1985 | acad. Georgy L. Smirnov |
| 1986–1988 | Corresponding Member RAS N. I. Lapin |
| 1988—2006 | acad. V. S. Stepin |
| 2006–2015 | acad. A. A. Guseinov |
| 2015–2021 | acad. Andrei V. Smirnov |
| 2021 | A. V. Chernyaev (acting) |
| since 2021 | acad. A. A. Guseinov (acting) |
