= Solomon Gonikman =

Soviet philosopher

Solomon Lvovitch Gonikman (Russian: Соломон Львович Гоникман; 1897–1979) was a Soviet philosopher.

Gonikman, a Menshevik-Internationalist in 1917, joined the Bolshevik party in 1919. From 1923 to 1924 he supported the Left Opposition. Gonikman became director of the Leningrad branch of the Institute of Red Professors. During the Stalinist purges he was expelled from the party on 16 February 1935 and arrested on 7 April 1936. Sentenced to 5 years in the camps. After the war rearrested, he was freed in 1953 and rehabilitated on 18 August 1956.

== Sources ==
- Yehoshua Yakhot: The Suppression of Philosophy in the USSR (The 1920s & 1930s)
- Marxists Internet Archive
