= Leonid Ilyichev =

Leonid Ilyichev (Russian: Леони́д Ильичёв, also Ilyichov) may refer to:

- Leonid Ilyichev (politician) (1906–1990), Soviet philosopher, journalist and politician
- Leonid Ilyichev (swimmer) (born 1948), Soviet Olympic swimmer
