= Mark Rozental =

Soviet philosopher and teacher

- Russian: Марк Моисеевич Розенталь
- Born: 19 February 1906
- Died: 2 February 1975 (aged 68)

Academic background
- Education: Institute of Red Professors

Academic work
- Discipline: philosophy sociology
- Main interests: dialectical materialism aesthetics history of philosophy
- Notable works: A Dictionary of Philosophy

Mark Moiseyevich Rozental (Russian: Марк Моисеевич Розенталь; 19 February 1906, Ustia – 2 February 1975, Moscow) was a Soviet philosopher and teacher, specializing in the fields of dialectical materialism, aesthetics, and the history of philosophy. He and Pavel Yudin were the main authors of A Dictionary of Philosophy, a Soviet dictionary on philosophy.

== Life ==
Rozental was born in Ustia, Ukraine, in 1906. He lost both parents to typhus at an early age. In 1925 he joined the Communist Party of the Soviet Union (CPSU). He worked at a metal factory and at a sugar mill before being admitted to the School of Philosophy in Moscow in 1928. In 1933, he graduated from the Institute of Red Professors. In 1946 he received a doctorate in philosophy.

Later in life he edited a journal of literary criticism and headed the department of Historical and Dialectical Materialism at the CPSU Central Committee's Higher Party School.

== Works ==
- Dialectics of the Present Epoch (Novosti, n.d.)
- Contra la sociología vulgar en la teoría literaria (1936)
- Dialéctica materialista (1937)
- Problemas de la Estética de Plejanov (1939)
- El método dialéctico marxista (1951)
- Principios de la lógica dialéctica (1960)
- Lenin y la dialéctica (1963)
- Teoría leninista del conocimiento (1965)
- Dialéctica de El Capital de Marx (1967)
- A Dictionary of Philosophy, written with Pavel Yudin (Progress Publishers, 1967)

== Awards ==
- Order of the Red Banner of Labour
