= Pavel Yudin =

Soviet philosopher and party official

- Павел Юдин
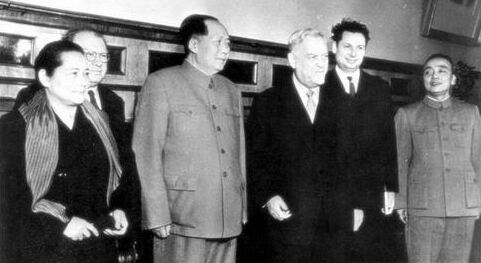
- Yudin standing to the left of Mao Zedong and Nikolai Bulganin in 1957

Soviet Ambassador to China
- In office 3 December 1953 – 15 October 1959
- Preceded by: Vasily Kuznetsov
- Succeeded by: Stepan Chervonenko

Director of the Association of State Book and Magazine Publishing Houses
- In office 1937–1947
- Preceded by: Mikhail Tomsky
- Succeeded by: Organization abolished

Member of the CPSU Central Committee Presidium
- In office 16 October 1952 – 5 March 1953

Personal details
- Born: 7 September 1899 Sergachsky Uyezd, Russian Empire
- Died: 10 April 1968 (aged 68) Moscow, Russian Federation
- Party: Communist Party of the Soviet Union
- Education: Leningrad Communist University; Institute of Red Professors
- Profession: Philosopher, Politician, Diplomat

Pavel Fyodorovich Yudin (Russian: Павел Фёдорович Юдин; 6 September [O.S. 26 August] 1899 – 10 April 1968) was a Soviet philosopher and Communist Party official specialising in the fields of culture and sociology, and later a diplomat.

== Biography ==
Born in to a family of poor Russian peasants, Yudin worked as a lathe operator in a railway workshop in 1917–19. He joined the Russian Communist Party (b) in 1918, served in the Red Army 1919–21, and graduated from the Zinoviev University (later renamed the Stalin University) in Leningrad in 1924, after which he began a post graduate course at the Institute of Red Professors, where he was one of the minority of students who supported Joseph Stalin against the Right Opposition led by Nikolai Bukharin, who opposed the forced collectivisation of agriculture.

Yudin was one of three signatories of an article, published in Pravda on 7 June 1930, denouncing Abram Deborin, who was the leading soviet communist philosopher of the 1920s. Deborin regarded the late Georgi Plekhanov as the most authoritative Russian Marxist philosopher. Yudin and his co-signatories - who included his long time colleague M. B. Mitin - upheld Vladimir Lenin as the greater philosopher. Unable to dislodge Deborin from his commanding position in the Institute of Red Professors, or his control over the scientific magazine Под Знаменем Марксисма (Pod Znamenem Marxisma - Under the Banner of Marxism), they made a direct appeal to Stalin in December 1930 to intervene. Stalin met the leaders of the party organisation within the Institute of Red Professors to tell them that Deborin was guilty of 'Menshevik idealism'. Yudin went on to claim that “the works of Comrade Stalin continue the best traditions of the founders of Marxism.”.

In January 1931, Yudin was co-opted onto the editorial board of Under the Banner of Marxism. In 1932–1938, he was Director of the Institute of Red Professors. From May 1933, until 1937, he was chief editor of the magazine Литературни Критик (Literaturni Kritic - Literary Critic). In 1934–37, he was deputy head of the Culture department of the Central Committee of the All-Union Communist Party (b).

=== Conflict with Gorky ===
In April 1932, Yudin signed one of the first attacks on RAPP, and its leader Leopold Averbakh, on the day when Stalin ordered RAPP to disband and be incorporated in the new Union of Soviet Writers. Yudin was one of the original members of the organising committee of the Writers Union, but very soon earned the contempt of its chairman, the writer Maxim Gorky, who wrote Stalin a long letter on 2 August 1934 accusing Yudin of promoting "intellectually feeble men." He added:

My attitude to Yudin is becoming more and more negative. I'm offended by his peasant cunning, his lack of principle, his duplicity, and the cowardice of someone who, while aware of his own personal impotence, attempts to surround himself with people even more insignificant and to hide among them.

=== Role in the Purges ===
During the Great Purge, according to the Yugoslav communist leader, Josip Broz Tito "in the Soviet Union there was a joke about Yudin, that he was 'the best philosopher among the NKVD-men and the best NKVD-man among the philosophers." In April 1937, he sent Stalin and Lazar Kaganovich a lengthy memo denouncing the playwright and poet Vladimir Kirshon as an associate of Averbakh and of the ousted former NKVD chief Genrikh Yagoda, both recently arrested, saying that Kirshon and Averbakh had "held discussions of a Trotskyite nature", and that Kirshon had undergone a "repugnant Political and personal disintegration." He also accused Gorky's long-serving former secretary Pyotr Kryuchkov of having 'poisoned' Gorky's relations with the writers union. Those four were all executed, but the historian Isaak Mints survived despite being denounced by Yudin, in the same letter as "a two-faced Janus, the toady of Yagoda and Kryuchkov."

=== Post War Career ===
In 1937–1946, Yudin was director of OGIZ (the Association of State Books and Magazines), the state publishing house. In 1939-1944 he was also Director of the Institute of Philosophy of the USSR Academy of Sciences. In 1940–42, Yudin and Mitin edited the three volume История философий (Istoriya filosofi - History of Philosophy), which won the 1942 Stalin Prize, reputedly the first book on philosophy to achieve that award. But in May 1944, the third volume was attacked in an editorial in the magazine Bolshevik for allegedly failing to recognise that the philosopher Georg Hegel was a German nationalist and racist. The Stalin Prize committee revised its previous decision, saying that the prize was for the first two volumes of the History of Philosophy, and Yudin and Mitin were sacked from the positions they held in the Institute of Philosophy and on the board of Under the Banner of Marxism. Yudin suffered another humiliation in October 1946, when he was accused of having mismanaged OGIZ, and was sacked.

These setbacks in Yudin's career obviously were connected to the rise of Andrei Zhdanov, who emerged around 1946 as the Soviet Communist Party's chief ideologist and Stalin's successor-in-waiting. That Yudin was frightened of Zhdanov is evident from the eyewitness account by the Serbian communist Koča Popović:

At the end of 1947 I paid a visit to Zhdanov about some problems relating to Albania. While we were discussing the matter, the telephone rang and Zhdanov told me that Yudin was coming with an issue of the Cominform journal, published in Belgrade. A few minutes later the door opened and Yudin came in, bowing towards Zhdanov while he was approaching him. He left the newspaper on the table and retreated, bowing all the time. He covered in that way more than six or seven yards, because the room was rather large, and in bowing himself out he backed into the door, while nervously trying to find the doorknob with his hand.

=== Diplomatic career ===
When Cominform was founded, in October 1947, Yudin was appointed editor of the Cominform journal, For a Lasting Peace, for a People's Democracy!, based in Belgrade, which was then the capital of Yugoslavia. There he played a major role in the split between the USSR and Yugoslavia, which culminated in the Yugoslav communist party's expulsion from Cominform, and a failed attempt by Moscow to destroy the Tito regime. In March 1948, Yudin suppressed an article written for the journal by the Yugoslav communists Vladimir Dedijer and Radovan Zogović, which had expressed solidarity with liberation movements in Asia. In that instance, he was almost certainly following orders, because he was allowed almost no initiative while running this magazine, every issue of which had to be sent to Moscow for approval before it could be published. But according to the future Soviet leader, Nikita Khrushchev, he used his position to sow trouble between Tito and Stalin, by sending Stalin a report alleging that the Yugoslavs had made insulting remarks about the military and technical advisers sent to them from the Soviet Union. The report was circulated to members of the Soviet Politburo Soon afterwards, the Soviet Union withdrew its advisers. On 27 March 1948, the Soviet leadership sent a letter Tito setting out various complaints, including an allegation that Yudin was under surveillance in Belgrade. Tito later alleged: "Yudin's work in Belgrade was not restricted to the paper. He took an active part in preparing the final reckoning with Yugoslavia. He tried hard to poison relations between Yugoslavia and her neighbours, especially Bulgaria and Albania."

In 1950, when Stalin was concerned that China might be the next communist country to refuse to recognise him as leader of the communist bloc, Yudin was dispatched to Beijing, to assist in arranging publication of the works of Mao Zedong. According to Khrushchev, this was at Mao's request, because "Mao wanted an educated man to help him put his works into proper shape and catch any mistakes in Marxist philosophy before Mao's works were published."

He was back in Moscow in October 1952, for the 19th Congress of the Soviet Communist Party, at which he was made a member of the Central Committee and a candidate member of the Praesidium of the Central Committee. After the Congress, he was sent to Berlin as political advisor to the Soviet Control Commission in East Germany. In 1953, he was promoted to the post of Deputy High Commissioner of the USSR in East Germany.

Yudin was Soviet Ambassador to China from 3 December 1953 to 15 October 1959. He was re-elected to the Central Committee at the 20th Party Congress in 1956 (the one during which Khrushchev delivered the Secret Speech exposing Stalin's crimes.) Having delivered a speech to the Central Committee plenum afterwards, Yudin reputedly exclaimed, purely out of habit "Long live Comrade Stalin!" - which produced an embarrassed silence, followed by an apology from the speaker. He was recalled from China after the split between the USSR and China, which followed Khrushchev's meeting with President Eisenhower in Camp David. On his return, he blamed Khrushchev, rather than Mao, for the split, to which Khrushchev retorted: "I might remark with some justification that we were sure to have discord with any country where Yudin was sent as ambassador. Yudin was sent to Yugoslavia and we had a falling out with Tito. Yudin went to China, and we had a falling out with Mao. This is no coincidence."

In 1960–68, Yudin worked at the Institute of Philosophy of the USSR Academy of Sciences. In 1966, he appeared as an "expert witness" for the prosecution at the trial of the writers, Andrei Sinyavsky and Yuli Daniel.

== In Literature ==
Yudin is mentioned by name in Vasili Grossman's classic novel, Life and Fate, when a soldier named Vavilov tells his comrades: "Once, I had to drive a lecturer from Moscow to the front - Pavel Fyodorovich Yudin. The member of the Military Soviet had said that it would be the end of me if I lost so much as a hair off his head. Now that was really hard work. We had to dive straight into the ditch if a plane came anywhere near. But Comrade Yudin certainly knew how to take care of himself - I'll say that for him."

== Works ==
- A Dictionary of Philosophy, written with Mark Rosenthal (Progress Publishers, 1967)
- The Prime Source of Development of Soviet Society (Foreign Languages Publishing House, 1950)
- Socialism and Law (Bolshevik, No. 17, p. 31-46, 1937)
