= Cominform =

Central organization of the International Communist Movement (1947–1956)

Information Bureau of the Communist and Workers' Parties Информационное бюро коммунистических и рабочих партий
- Founder: Joseph Stalin
- Founded: 5 October 1947
- Dissolved: 17 April 1956
- Preceded by: Comintern
- Succeeded by: Comecon; Warsaw Pact
- Headquarters: Belgrade, Yugoslavia (1947–1948); Bucharest, Romania (1948–1956)
- Newspaper: For a Lasting Peace, for a People's Democracy!
- Ideology: Communism; Marxism–Leninism; Stalinism
- Political position: Far-left
- Colours: Red

The Information Bureau of the Communist and Workers' Parties (Russian: Информационное бюро коммунистических и рабочих партий, romanized: Informatsionnoye byuro kommunisticheskikh i rabochikh partiy), commonly known as Cominform (Коминформ), was a co-ordination body of Marxist–Leninist and communist parties in Europe which existed from 1947 to 1956. Formed in the wake of the dissolution of the Communist International in 1943, it did not replace that body, but instead mainly served as an expression of solidarity and as a means of disseminating Stalinist propaganda. The Cominform initially included the communist parties of the Soviet Union, Bulgaria, Czechoslovakia, Hungary, Poland, Romania, Yugoslavia (expelled in 1948), France, and Italy. The organization was dissolved in 1956, during de-Stalinization, largely replaced in function by the Warsaw Pact formed in 1955 and Comecon formed in 1949.

== Overview ==
=== Establishment and purpose ===
The Information Bureau of the Communist and Workers' Parties was unofficially founded at a conference of Marxist–Leninist communist parties from across Europe in Szklarska Poręba, People's Republic of Poland, in September 1947. Joseph Stalin, the leader of the Soviet Union (USSR), called the conference in response to divergences among communist governments on whether or not to attend the Paris Conference on the Marshall Plan in July 1947. It was founded with nine members: the Communist Party of the Soviet Union, the Bulgarian Communist Party, the Communist Party of Czechoslovakia, the Hungarian Communist Party, the Polish Workers' Party, the Romanian Communist Party, the Communist Party of Yugoslavia, the French Communist Party, and the Italian Communist Party. The organization was commonly known as Cominform, an abbreviation of "Communist Information Bureau", itself a shortened version of the official name.

The Cominform was officially established on 5 October 1947 to coordinate actions among European communist parties under the direction of the Soviet Union. Cominform was not intended to be a replacement or successor to the Communist International (Comintern), the international organization that advocated world communism and dissolved in 1943, but was considered a type of successor. However, starting in 1950, Stalin began pushing for the Cominform's functions to be greatly expanded, almost to the scale of the Comintern. This push ceased after his death. Cominform was not a world communist party and did not have subordinates or power, limiting itself to its newspaper, For a Lasting Peace, for a People's Democracy!, published in several languages, and to one goal: "to organize an exchange of experience, and where necessary to coordinate the activity of the Communist parties, on the basis of mutual agreement." A vast array of articles was published, including some not published by members such as the Canadian Communist Party. Cominform was to organize the propagation of communist interests and repel the expansion of anti-communism in the aftermath of World War II and the subsequent Cold War, dividing the world (per the Zhdanov Doctrine) into imperialist and anti-imperialist factions. Cominform specifically tasked the French and Italian communist parties with the obstruction of the implementation of the Marshall Plan and the Truman Doctrine in Western Europe. From a global standpoint the Cominform strived/ventured to unite the Communist parties against the copious policies which threatened to empower Western Europe to oppose communism, mainly through pinpointing/underlining the importance of national independence and peace. More importantly, though, was that the Cominform had to remain small in size (Eurocentric Organization), in order to preserve its maneuverability and efficient centralisation, mainly because it operated as a propaganda tool controlled by the International Communist movement to instruct and inform the leading members of the different national parties. Its members were communist parties and, as such, would guarantee the safeguarding of the monolith of the communist movement. The primary reason for the Communist Party of Greece not being a member was fears of Western powers using this to paint the KKE as foreign insurgents. However, they did contribute to Cominform publications. Because of the Chinese Civil War, the Chinese Communist Party (CCP) was also not invited for a similar reason as Greece. The CCP nonetheless adhered to Cominform policy. In a conversation with Liu Shaoqi, Stalin indicated that he was not opposed to the CCP joining the Cominform, only that it was unnecessary at the time. There were plans for the CCP to lead an Asian Cominform of some sort, but this idea was seemingly forgotten with death of Joseph Stalin and weakening of the Cominform.

=== Expulsion of Yugoslavia ===
Cominform was initially located in Belgrade, Federative People's Republic of Yugoslavia, but after the Tito–Stalin split expelled Yugoslavia from the group in June 1948, the seat was moved to Bucharest, Romanian People's Republic. Officially, Yugoslavia was expelled for "Titoism" and anti-Sovietism, based on accusations of deviating from Marxism–Leninism. Yugoslavia was considered heretical for resisting Soviet dominance over its affairs and for its integration into the Eastern Bloc as a Soviet satellite state. It is believed that one of the most decisive factors that led to the expulsion of Yugoslavia was their commitment to supporting communist insurgents in the Greek Civil War, in violation of the "Percentages Agreement" between the Soviet Union and United Kingdom, and their decision to station troops in People's Republic of Albania. However, this was not the official line of reasoning from the USSR. In fact, Cominform publications accused Yugoslavia of supporting the anti-communist insurgents in the Greek Civil War. The expulsion of the Communist Party of Yugoslavia from Cominform initiated the Informbiro period of Yugoslavian history. The Cominform's newspaper was initially printed in Belgrade; after the expulsion, it was moved to Bucharest.

=== Dissolution ===
From 1950, the Cominform became rapidly irrelevant after the victory of the People's Republic of China in the Chinese Civil War, weakening Europe as the center of communism. Cominform, composed entirely of European parties, was rendered essentially useless in Soviet influence over the international communist movement. No attempts were made to reorganize the Cominform, and its decline accelerated drastically after the death of Stalin in March 1953. Meanwhile, the Soviets had gradually replaced Cominform with more effective and specialized organizations to exert their influence, such as the Council for Mutual Economic Assistance (Comecon) in 1949 and the Warsaw Pact in 1955. Cominform was officially dissolved on 17 April 1956 in a decision by the Central Committee of the CPSU, prompted by the Soviet rapprochement with Yugoslavia and the de-Stalinization process following the rise of Nikita Khrushchev as Stalin's successor.

== Meetings ==
There are four recorded meetings of the Cominform before 1956.

=== Founding meeting ===
This founding meeting took place on 22–23 September 1947 in Jelenia Góra, Poland. Members present at the first meeting were Edvard Kardelj and Milovan Djilas for the Federative People's Republic of Yugoslavia; Valko Chervenkov and Vladimir Poptomov for the Bulgarian People's Republic; Gheorghiu-Dej and Anna Pauker for the Romanian People's Republic; Mihály Farkas and József Révai for the Second Hungarian Republic; Władysław Gomułka and Hilary Minc for Poland; Andrei Zhdanov and Georgy Malenkov for the USSR; Jacques Duclos and Étienne Fajon for France; Rudolf Slánský and Štefan Bašťovanský for the Third Czechoslovak Republic; and Luigi Longo and Eugenio Reale for Italy. Zhdanov was chairman, and Gomułka was appointed vice-chairman.

Gomułka was given the task of making the first report, titled On the interchange of experience and co-ordination, with the second being a report by Zhdanov on the global status quo. In the former report, the key points, apart from Poland's evaluation, seem to be criticisms of the French and Italian communist parties after the emancipation, due to their missing the opportunity to seize power, contrary to the Eastern Europeans, who proved their political superiority by quickly dealing with the issue of ensuring their dominance in the government. The significance of this criticism is shown by the regret of the French and Italian representatives, accompanied by the following statement in the final resolution: "the need for interchange and voluntary co-ordination of action in the various parties is particularly keenly felt at the present time".

Zhdanov's report was of critical importance to communist ideology. After mentioning the original disbandment of the Communist International in May 1943, Zhdanov pointed out the fact that "the present position of the communist parties had its shortcomings. [...] The need for mutual consultation and voluntary co-ordination had become particularly urgent at the present juncture". The reason for this, according to Zhdanov, lay in the new global state, which led to new tasks being passed down to the communist parties of the new democratic states, as well as to the "fraternal communist parties of France, Italy, Great Britain and other countries". Furthermore, given that some understood the dissolution of the Comintern as the subsequent elimination of all ties, "continued isolation" led "to a slackening of mutual understanding and at times even to serious blunders".

The first part of Zhdanov's report was included in a published declaration that designated the task of the communist parties as "taking into their hands the banner of defense of national independence and sovereignty of their countries". The following part, in combination with Gomułka's report, formed the preamble of the resolution, which underlined the following five key points:

1. That an Information Bureau should be established, which would consist of spokespeople of the nine participating communist parties.
2. That it should be assigned the task of interchanging information and coordination, if need be.
3. That the Bureau should consist of two delegates from each of the nine parties.
4. That the Bureau should produce a journal, which at first would be published every two weeks, and weekly after a while.
5. That the Bureau should be situated in Belgrade, Yugoslavia.

The two Western communist parties (the French and the Italian) were assigned two tasks: to claim the leadership of their countries once again and prepare for a fierce fight, and to take whatever measures were necessary to ensure that the "American Policy" would not be implemented in Western Europe. Their ineffective policy had to be replaced by one of strikes, mass action, and sabotage. The first general "attack" was launched in France on 18 November 1947, and in Italy on 12 November. Both turned out to be quite violent. The wave of attacks ended by the end of the year because the workers had failed to carry out the communist instructions, and the two communist parties were unwilling to continue the fight. Strikes continued sporadically, but without public support.

=== Second meeting ===
The second meeting occurred in Belgrade on 1 February 1948. During the meeting, a permanent editorial board was chosen for the newspaper For a Lasting Peace, for a People's Democracy!, which was first issued in Belgrade on 1 November 1947. The editorial board was under the leadership of Pavel Yudin, who was succeeded by Mark Borisovich Mitin after the Yugoslavian expulsion from the Cominform.

=== Third meeting ===
A third meeting was held in Romania on 28 June 1948. It was during this meeting that the Yugoslav Communist Party was expelled. Furthermore, the Cominform's headquarters were relocated to Bucharest, and the group initiated a campaign to transform the programs and cadres of Eastern European communist parties. In a unanimous resolution, the eight communist parties agreed that the Yugoslav Communist Party had "pursued an incorrect line on the main questions of home and foreign policy, a line appropriate only to nationalism, and which represented a departure from Marxism-Leninism". The parties approved the actions of the Russian communist party and condemned Yugoslavia's agricultural policy, which sidelined class differentiation—"regarding the individual peasantry as a single entity and even asserting that the peasantry was the most stable foundation of their state"—a role meant for the proletariat. Because Yugoslavia refused to abide by the Cominform's discipline and ignored its criticism, it had receded from the "family of fraternal communist parties". Anything that Tito could have "infected" was meant to be eliminated. The decisive action against him had been agreed upon by the end of June. At the beginning of July, two communist parties, namely the Polish and the Bulgarian ones, were summoned to reconsider their ideologies. Gomułka, Kostov, Rajk, Markos and Xoxe immediately aroused suspicion. On 6 July 1948, a Plenum of the Central Committee of the Polish Workers' Party was convened to discuss Gomułka's considerable deviations from Party doctrine. Aleksander Zawadzki and Roman Zambrowski presented a "clear Marxist–Leninist analysis". The Plenum met again from 31 August to 3 September. Gomułka accepted responsibility for his wrongdoing and was replaced by Minc.

Gomułka was arrested, set free, then re-incarcerated. On 12–13 July 1948, the Central Committee of the Bulgarian Communist Party "unanimously declared that the leadership of our party has never doubted the leading role played by the Russian communist party and the Soviet Union in the democratic camp". It noted that it had not been sufficiently vigilant towards the Yugoslav Communist Party. In June, a new wave of retaliation against perceived supporters of Tito emerged. On 10 June, Koçi Xoxe was hanged in Albania, and on 15 June, László Rajk was arrested in Hungary. Another wave of attacks was carried out in the autumn of the same year, during which Rajk was hanged, Gomułka was arrested, and Traicho Kostov's indictment was published. These attacks seem to have originated from the conflict between Tito and the Russians.

=== Fourth meeting ===
Lastly, the fourth meeting was held in Hungarian People's Republic on 27 November 1949. Two reports were presented, resulting in three resolutions. The Soviet delegate, Mikhail Suslov, presented a report titled On the Defence of Peace and the fight against warmongers, which urged the people of Western countries to oppose any imperialist measures taken by their governments against the Eastern Bloc. Palmiro Togliatti presented a report about the working class and the tasks of the communist and workers' parties. This resolution pinpointed the "particular attention which should be devoted to the mass of Catholic workers". Finally, the Romanian delegate, Gheorghe Gheorghiu-Dej, concluded that, as Tito's establishment had not been dealt with, it was the duty of the communist parties to strengthen the fight against it by making more noticeable the net of economic and diplomatic pressure and by urging Tito's opposition within Yugoslavia to start secret activity.

== Press organ ==
The fortnightly journal For a Lasting Peace, for a People's Democracy! was published by the Cominform in Russian, French and English.

== Member parties ==
- Bulgarian Communist Party
- Communist Party of Czechoslovakia
- French Communist Party
- Hungarian Communist Party, then Hungarian Working People's Party
- Italian Communist Party
- Polish Workers' Party, then Polish United Workers' Party
- Romanian Workers' Party
- Communist Party of the Soviet Union
- Communist Party of Yugoslavia, until its expulsion in 1948.
- Communist Party of the Free Territory of Trieste, until Yugoslavia's expulsion of 1948.

== See also ==
- Comintern
- Comecon
- Danube Commission
- International Meeting of Communist and Workers' Parties
- Warsaw Pact
- World Marxist Review
