= Historiography in the Soviet Union =

Study of history in the Soviet Union

Soviet historiography is the methodology of history studies by historians in the Soviet Union (USSR). In the USSR, the study of history was marked by restrictions imposed by the Communist Party of the Soviet Union (CPSU). Soviet historiography is itself studied in modern historiography.

== Theoretical approaches ==
George M. Enteen identifies two approaches to the study of Soviet historiography. A totalitarian approach associated with the Western analysis of the Soviet Union as a totalitarian society, controlled by the Central Committee of the Communist Party of the Soviet Union, this school "thought that signs of dissent merely represented a misreading of commands from above."^{363} For Enteen the other school of writing on Soviet historiography is the social-history school which draws attention to "important initiative from historians at odds with the dominant powers in the field."^{363} Enteen is unable to decide between these different approaches based on current literature.

In Markwick's view there are a number of important post war historiographical movements, which have antecedents in the 1920s and 1930s. Surprisingly these include culturally and psychologically focused history. In the late 1920s Stalinists began limiting individualist approaches to history, culminating in the publication of Stalin and other's "Short Course" History of the Soviet Communist Party (1938). This crystallised the piatichlenka or five official periods of history in terms of vulgar dialectical materialism: primitive-communism, slavery, feudalism, capitalism and socialism.^{284} Following publication of the "Short course", on 14 November 1938 the Central Committee of the Communist Party of the Soviet Union issued a special statement that the course and its chapter "About dialectic and historical materialism" were declared as "encyclopedia of philosophical knowledge in a field of Marxism-Leninism", in which were given "official and verified by the Central Committee interpretation of basic issues of history of the All-Russian Communist Party (Bolsheviks) and Marxism-Leninism and without allowing any other arbitrary interpretations".

While the triumph of Stalinist history was being imposed, different modes of history began to emerge. These included BA Romanov's People and Morals in Ancient Rus' (1947), a study of mentalités at the height of the Zhdanovshchina. However, it was not until the 20th Congress of the CPSU that different schools of history emerged from the Stalinist freeze. Firstly, a "new direction" within Leninist materialism emerged, as an effectively loyal opposition to Stalinist dialectical materialism, secondly a social psychology of history emerged through a reading of Leninist psychology, thirdly a "culturological" tendency emerged.^{284–285}

== Characteristics of Soviet historiography ==
Soviet-era historiography was deeply influenced by Marxism. Marxism maintains that the moving forces of history are determined by material production and the rise of different socioeconomic formations. Applying this perspective to socioeconomic formations such as slavery and feudalism is a major methodological principle of Marxist historiography. Based on this principle, historiography predicts that there will be an abolition of capitalism by a socialist revolution made by the working class. Soviet historians believed that Marxist–Leninist theory permitted the application of categories of dialectical and historical materialism in the study of historical events.

Marx and Engels' ideas of the importance of class struggle in history, the destiny of the working class, and the role of the dictatorship of the proletariat and the revolutionary party are of major importance in Marxist methodology.

Marxist–Leninist historiography has several aspects. It explains the social basis of historical knowledge, determines the social functions of historical knowledge and the means by which these functions are carried out, and emphasizes the need to study concepts in connection with the social and political life of the period in which these concepts were developed.

It studies the theoretical and methodological features in every school of historical thought. Marxist–Leninist historiography analyzes the source-study basis of a historical work, the nature of the use of sources, and specific research methods. It analyzes problems of historical research as the most important sign of the progress and historical knowledge and as the expression of the socioeconomic and political needs of a historical period.

Soviet historiography has been severely criticized by scholars, chiefly—but not only—outside the Soviet Union and Russia. Its status as "scholarly" at all has been questioned, and it has often been dismissed as ideology and pseudoscience. Robert Conquest concluded that "All in all, unprecedented terror must seem necessary to ideologically motivated attempts to transform society massively and speedily, against its natural possibilities. The accompanying falsifications took place, and on a barely credible scale, in every sphere. Real facts, real statistics, disappeared into the realm of fantasy. History, including the history of the Communist Party, or rather especially the history of the Communist Party, was rewritten. Unpersons disappeared from the official record. A new past, as well as new present, was imposed on the captive minds of the Soviet population, as was, of course, admitted when truth emerged in the late 1980s."

That criticism stems from the fact that in the Soviet Union, science was far from independent. Since the late 1930s, Soviet historiography treated the party line and reality as one and the same. As such, if it was a science, it was a science in service of a specific political and ideological agenda, commonly employing historical revisionism. In the 1930s, historical archives were closed and original research was severely restricted. Historians were required to pepper their works with references—appropriate or not—to Stalin and other "Marxist–Leninist classics", and to pass judgment—as prescribed by the Party—on pre-revolution historic Russian figures. Nikita Khrushchev commented that "Historians are dangerous and capable of turning everything upside down. They have to be watched."

The state-approved history was openly subjected to politics and propaganda, similar to philosophy, art, and many fields of scientific research. The Party could not be proven wrong, it was infallible and reality was to conform to this line. Any non-conformist history had to be erased, and questioning of the official history was illegal.

Many works of Western historians were forbidden or censored, and many areas of history were also forbidden for research because, officially, they had never happened. For this reason, Soviet historiography remained mostly outside the international historiography of the period. Translations of foreign historiography were produced (if at all) in a truncated form, accompanied by extensive censorship and "corrective" footnotes. For example, in the Russian 1976 translation of Basil Liddell Hart's History of the Second World War pre-war purges of Red Army officers, the secret protocol to the Molotov–Ribbentrop Pact, many details of the Winter War, the occupation of the Baltic states, the Soviet occupation of Bessarabia and Northern Bukovina, Allied assistance to the Soviet Union during the war, many other Western Allies' efforts, the Soviet leadership's mistakes and failures, criticism of the Soviet Union and other content were censored out.

The official version of Soviet history was dramatically changed after every major governmental shake-up. Previous leaders were denounced as "enemies", whereas current leaders usually became the subject of a personality cult. Textbooks were rewritten periodically, with figures—such as Leon Trotsky or Joseph Stalin—disappearing from their pages or being turned from great figures to great villains.

Certain regions and periods of history were made unreliable for political reasons. Entire historical events could be erased if they did not fit the party line. For example, until 1989 the Soviet leadership and historians, unlike their Western colleagues, had denied the existence of a secret protocol to the Soviet-German Molotov–Ribbentrop Pact of 1939, and as a result the Soviet approach to the study of the Soviet-German relations before 1941 and the origins of World War II were remarkably flawed. In another example, the Soviet invasion of Poland in 1939 as well as the Polish-Soviet War of 1919–1920 were censored out or minimized in most publications, and research was suppressed, in order to enforce the policy of 'Polish-Soviet friendship'. Similarly, the enforced collectivisation, the wholesale deportations or massacres of small nationalities in the Caucasus or the disappearance of the Crimean Tatars were not recognized as facts worthy of mention. Soviet historians also engaged in producing false claims and falsification of history; for example Soviet historiography falsely claimed that the Katyn massacre was carried out by Germans rather than by Soviets. Yet another example is related to the case of Soviet reprisals against former Soviet POWs returning from Germany; some of them were treated as traitors and imprisoned in Gulags for many years, yet that policy was denied or minimized by Soviet historians for decades and modern Western scholars have noted that "In the past, Soviet historians engaged for the most part in a disinformation campaign about the extent of the prisoner-of-war problem."

== Marxist influence ==
The Soviet interpretation of Marxism predetermined much of the research done by historians. Research by scholars in the USSR was limited to a large extent due to this predetermination. Some Soviet historians could not offer non-Marxist theoretical explanations for their interpretation of sources. This was true even when alternate theories had a greater explanatory power in relation to a historian's reading of source material.

The Marxist theory of historical materialism identified means of production as chief determinants of the historical process. They led to the creation of social classes, and class struggle was the motor of history. The sociocultural evolution of societies was considered to progress inevitably from slavery, through feudalism and capitalism to socialism and finally communism. In addition, Leninism argued that a vanguard party was required to lead the working class in the revolution that would overthrow capitalism and replace it with socialism.

Soviet historiography interpreted this theory to mean that the creation of the Soviet Union was the most important turning event in human history, since the USSR was considered to be the first socialist society. Furthermore, the Communist Party—considered to be the vanguard of the working class – was given the role of permanent leading force in society, rather than a temporary revolutionary organization. As such, it became the protagonist of history, which could not be wrong. Hence the unlimited powers of the Communist Party leaders were claimed to be as infallible and inevitable as the history itself. It also followed that a worldwide victory of communist countries is inevitable. All research had to be based on those assumptions and could not diverge in its findings. In 1956, Soviet academician Anna Pankratova said that "the problems of Soviet historiography are the problems of our Communist ideology."

Soviet historians have also been criticized for a Marxist bias in the interpretation of other historical events, unrelated to the Soviet Union. Thus, for example, they assigned to the rebellions in the Roman Empire the characteristics of the social revolution.

Often, the Marxist bias and propaganda demands came into conflict: hence the peasant rebellions against the early Soviet rule, such as the Tambov Rebellion of 1920–21, were simply ignored as inconvenient politically and contradicting the official interpretation of the Marxist theories.

== Soviet views of history ==
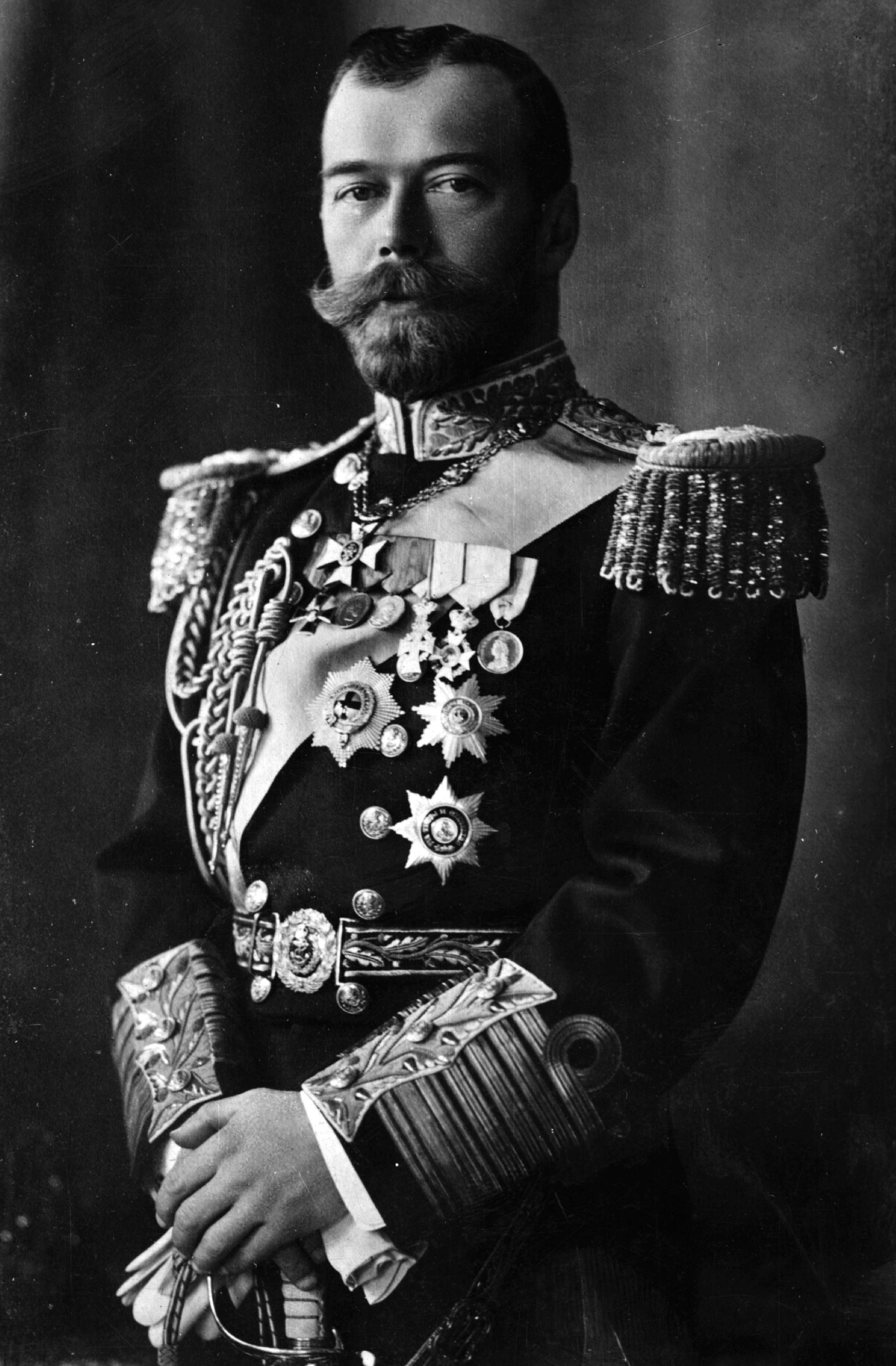
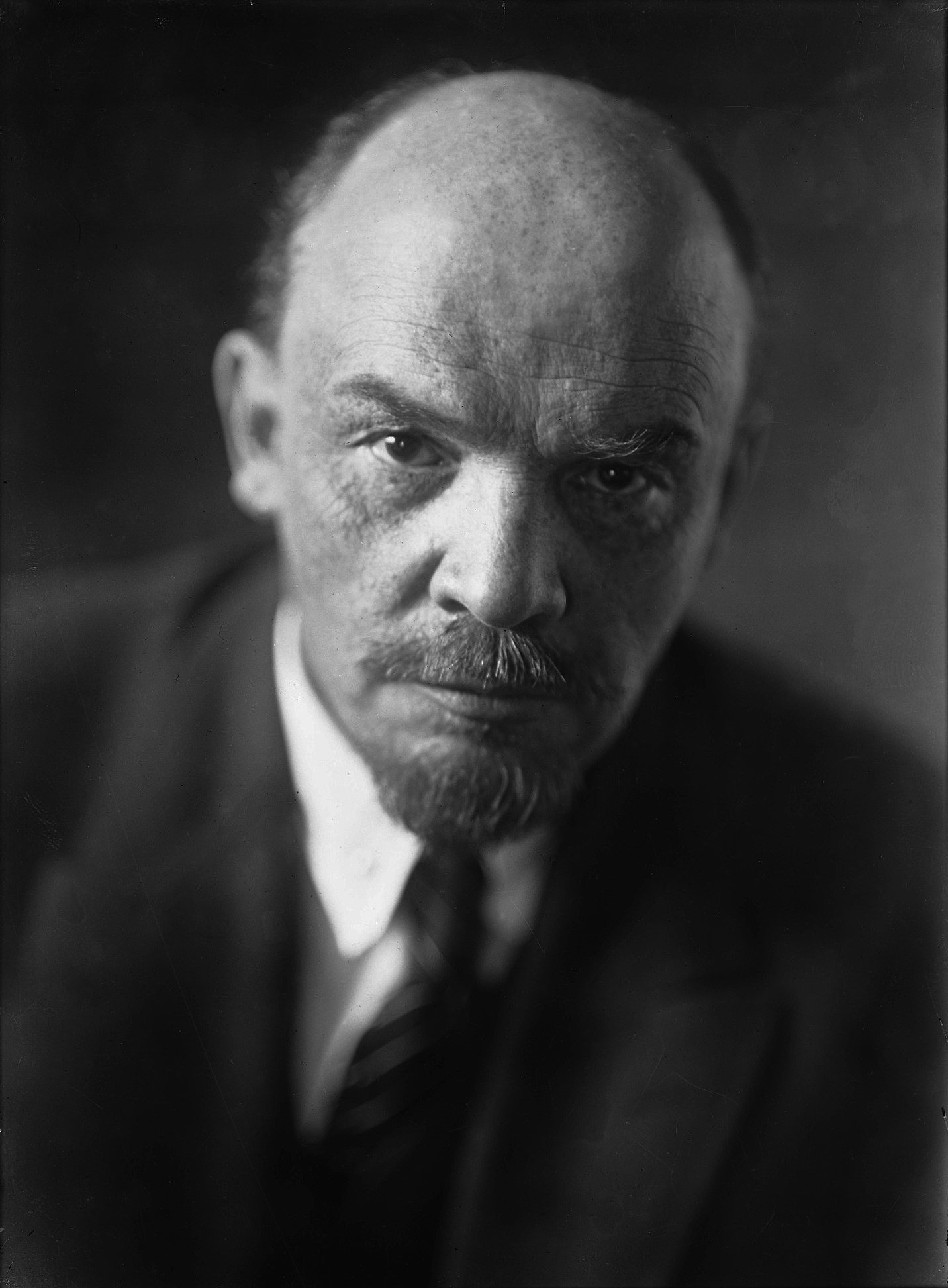
Soviet historiography portrayed Tsar Nicholas II as a weak and incompetent leader whose decisions led to military defeats and the deaths of millions of his subjects, while Vladimir Lenin's reputation was protected at all costs, absolving him of any responsibility in atrocities committed during his rule, such as the Romanov murders.

Soviet and earlier Slavophile historians emphasized the Slavic roots in the foundation of the Russian state in contrast to the Normanist theory of the Vikings conquering the Slavs and founding the Kievan Rus'. There was an outright ban of the theory about the Varangian origin of Kievan Rus in the Soviet Union for ideological reasons. "Anti-Normanists" accused Normanist theory proponents of distorting history by depicting the Slavs as undeveloped primitives. In contrast, Soviet historians stated that the Slavs laid the foundations of their statehood long before the Norman/Viking raids, while the Norman/Viking invasions only served to hinder the historical development of the Slavs. They argued that Rus' composition was Slavic and that Rurik and Oleg's success was rooted in their support from within the local Slavic aristocracy. After the dissolution of the USSR, Novgorod acknowledged its Viking history by incorporating a Viking ship into its logo.

Soviet historians trace the origin of feudalism in Russia to the 11th century, after the founding of the Russian state. The class struggle in medieval times is emphasized because of the hardships of feudal relations. For example, Soviet historians argue that uprisings in Kiev in 1068–69 were a reflection of the class struggle. There was a constant struggle between the powers of the princes and those of the feudal aristocracy, known as the boyars. In regions like Novgorod, the boyar aristocracy was able to limit the prince's power by making the office and the head of church elective.

The Mongol conquests in the 13th century had significant consequences for Russia. Soviet historians emphasize the cruelty of Genghis Khan and the suffering and devastation that Russia endured. Soviet historians attribute the success of Genghis Khan to the fact that feudalism among his people had not developed, which would have involved feudal and political strife. By contrast, the peoples opposed to the Mongols were in a mature state of feudalism and the political disunity that went with it. Soviet historians conclude that the Mongol domination had disastrous consequences for Russia's historical progress and development. It is also argued that by bearing the full weight of the Mongolian invasions, Russia helped to save Western Europe from outside domination.

The struggle against foreign domination and the heroism of its participants is a recurring theme in Soviet historiography. Soviet historians have an upbeat assessment of Alexander Nevsky, characterized as one of the greatest military leaders of his time for defeating the German knights' invasions of Russia in the 13th century. Much importance is attached to the Battle of Kulikovo (1380), which marked the beginning of the end of the Mongol domination of Russia. Dmitry Donskoi, for his leadership in the struggle against the Mongols, is credited for being an outstanding military commander and contributing significantly to the unity of the Russian lands.

== Reliability of statistical data ==
"The deceptive figure". This is the translation of a widely cited article ("Lukavaia Tsifra") by journalist Vasilii Seliunin and economist Grigorii Khanin, in Novyi Mir, February 1987, #2: 181–202

Various Sovietologists have raised the issue of the quality (accuracy and reliability) of data published in the Soviet Union and used in historical research. The Marxist theoreticians of the Party regarded statistics as a social science; hence many applications of statistical mathematics were curtailed, particularly during the Stalin era. Under central planning, nothing could occur by accident. The law of large numbers or the idea of random deviation were decried as "false theories". Statistical journals were closed; world-renowned statisticians like Andrey Kolmogorov and Eugen Slutsky abandoned statistical research.

As with all Soviet historiography, the reliability of Soviet statistical data varied from period to period. The first revolutionary decade and the period of Stalin's dictatorship both appear highly problematic with regard to statistical reliability; very few statistical data were published from 1936 to 1956. Notably, the 1937 census' organizers were executed and results destroyed altogether, and no further censuses were conducted until 1959. The reliability of data improved after 1956 when some missing data was published and Soviet experts themselves published some adjusted data for the Stalin era; however the quality of documentation has deteriorated.

Some researchers say that on occasion the Soviet authorities may have completely "invented" statistical data potentially useful in historical research (such as economic data invented to prove the successes of the Soviet industrialization, or some published numbers of Gulag prisoners and terror victims—as Conquest claims). Data was falsified both during collection—by local authorities who would be judged by the central authorities based on whether their figures reflected the central economy prescriptions—and by internal propaganda, with its goal of portraying the Soviet state in the most positive light to its own citizens. Nonetheless the policy of not publishing—or simply not collecting—data that was deemed unsuitable for various reasons was much more common than simple falsification; hence the many gaps in Soviet statistical data. Inadequate or missing documentation for much of Soviet statistical data is also a significant problem.

== Credibility ==
In his book, The Stalin School of Falsification, Leon Trotsky cited a range of historical documents such as private letters, telegrams, party speeches, meeting minutes, and suppressed texts such as Lenin's Testament, to argue that the Stalinist faction routinely distorted political events, forged a theoretical basis for irreconcilable concepts such as the notion of "Socialism in One Country" and misrepresented the views of opponents. He also argued that the Stalinist regime employed an array of professional historians as well as economists to justify policy manoeuvering and safeguarding its own set of material interests.

Not all areas of Soviet historiography were equally affected by the ideological demands of the government; additionally, the intensity of these demands varied over time. The impact of ideological demands also varied based on the field of history. The areas most affected by ideological demands were 19th and 20th century history, especially Russian and Soviet history. Part of the Soviet historiography was affected by extreme ideological bias, and potentially compromised by the deliberate distortions and omissions. Yet part of Soviet historiography produced a large body of significant scholarship which continues to be used in the modern research.

== Experiences of individual Soviet historians ==
Mikhail Pokrovsky (1862–1932) was held in the highest regard as a historian in the Soviet Union and was elected to the Soviet Academy of Sciences in 1929. He emphasized Marxist theory, downplaying the role of personality in favour of economics as the driving force of history. However posthumously Pokrovsky was accused of "vulgar sociologism", and his books were banned. After Stalin's death, and the subsequent renouncement of his policies during the Khrushchev Thaw, Pokrovsky's work regained some influence.

When Eduard Burdzhalov, then the deputy editor of the foremost Soviet journal on history, in spring of 1956 published a bold article examining the role of Bolsheviks in 1917 and demonstrated that Stalin had been an ally of Kamenev—who had been executed as a traitor in 1936—and that Lenin had been a close associate of Zinoviev—who had been executed as a traitor in 1936—Burdzhalov was moved to an uninfluential post.

== Underground historiography ==
The Brezhnev Era was the time of samizdat (circulating unofficial manuscripts within the USSR) and tamizdat (illegal publication of work abroad). The three most prominent Soviet dissidents of that era were Alexandr Solzhenitsyn, Andrei Sakharov and Roy Medvedev. Of the tamizdat authors, Solzhenitsyn was the most famous, publishing The Gulag Archipelago in the West in 1973. Medvedev's Let History Judge: The Origins and Consequences of Stalinism was published in 1971 in the West. Neither could publish in the Soviet Union until the advent of Perestroika and Glasnost.

== Influence of Soviet historiography in modern Russia ==
The 2006 Russian book, A Modern History of Russia: 1945–2006: A Manual for History Teachers has received significant attention as it was publicly endorsed by Russian president Vladimir Putin. Putin said that "we can't allow anyone to impose a sense of guilt on us" and that the new manual helps present a more balanced view of Russian history than that promoted by the West. The book says that repressions, carried out by Stalin and others, were "a necessary evil in response to a cold war started by America against the Soviet Union." It cites a recent opinion poll in Russia that gave Stalin an approval rating of 47%, and states that "The Soviet Union was not a democracy, but it was an example for millions of people around the world of the best and fairest society."

The Economist contends that the book is inspired by Soviet historiography in its treatment of the Cold War, as it claims that the Cold War was started by the United States, that the Soviet Union was acting in self-defense, and that the USSR did not lose the Cold War but rather voluntarily ended it. According to The Economist, "rabid anti-Westernism is the leitmotif of [the book's] ideology."

In 2009, president Dmitri Medvedev created the Historical Truth Commission, against the perceived anti-Soviet and anti-Russian slander. Officially, the Commission's mission is to "defend Russia against falsifiers of history and those who would deny Soviet contribution to the victory in World War II." United Russia has proposed a draft law that would mandate jail terms of three to five years "for anyone in the former Soviet Union convicted of rehabilitating Nazism."

== See also ==
- Agitprop (Soviet propaganda)
- Bibliography of the Russian Revolution and Civil War
- Bibliography of Stalinism and the Soviet Union
- Bibliography of the post-Stalinist Soviet Union
- Bibliography of science and technology in Russia and the Soviet Union
- Censorship in the Soviet Union
- Historiography of World War II § USSR
- Propaganda in the Soviet Union
- Samizdat (illegal underground publications in Soviet Union)
