= Mikhail Pokrovsky =

Russian Soviet historian, revolutionary and writer (1868–1932)

- Михаил Покровский
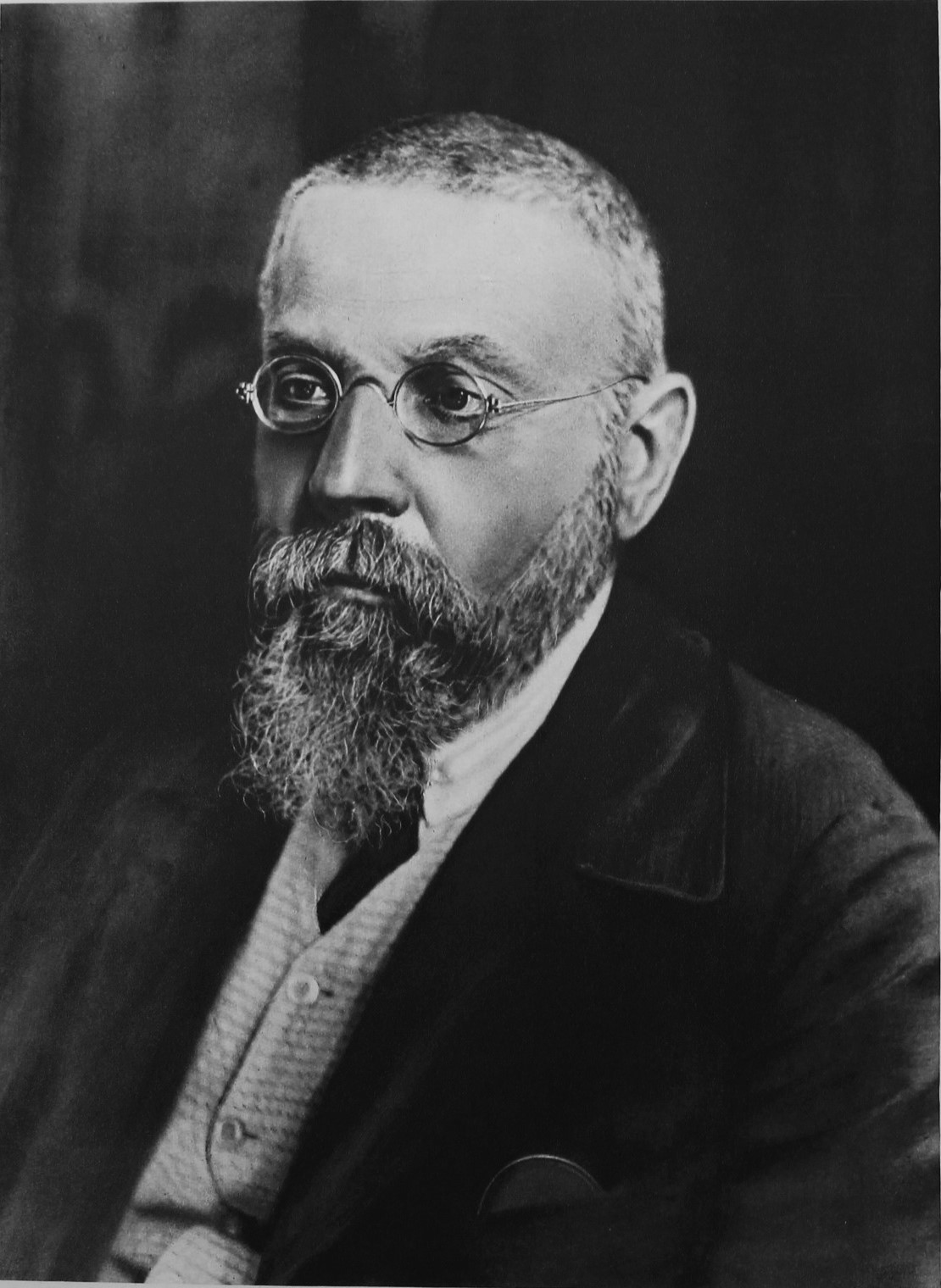

Mayor of Moscow
- In office November 1917 – March 1918
- Preceded by: Victor Nogin
- Succeeded by: Pyotr Smidovich

Personal details
- Born: 17 August [O.S. 5 August] 1868
- Died: August 29, 1932 (aged 64)
- Resting place: Kremlin Wall Necropolis
- Party: CPSU
- Occupation: Historian, politician
- Awards: Order of Lenin
- Board member of: Izvestia; SAON; АН СССР

Academic background
- Education: Moscow State University
- Academic advisors: Vasily Klyuchevsky; Paul Vinogradoff

Academic work
- Discipline: History
- Sub-discipline: Dialectical materialism and Social history
- Institutions: Institute of Red Professors
- Notable students: Anna Pankratova
- Notable works: Brief History of Russia
- Influenced: Rabfaks
- Political party: VKP(b)
- Other political affiliations: Vpered; Bolsheviks; RSDLP; Union of Liberation

Mikhail Nikolayevich Pokrovsky (Russian: Михаи́л Никола́евич Покро́вский; 29 August [O.S. 17 August] 1868 – April 10, 1932) was a Russian Marxist historian, revolutionary and a Soviet public and political figure. One of the earliest professionally trained historians to join the Russian revolutionary movement, Pokrovsky is regarded as the most influential Soviet historian of the 1920s and was known as “the head of the Marxist historical school in the USSR”.

Pokrovsky was neither a Bolshevik nor a Menshevik for nearly a decade prior to the October Revolution of 1917, instead living in European exile as an independent radical close to philosopher Alexander Bogdanov. Following the Bolshevik seizure of power, Pokrovsky rejoined the Bolshevik Party and moved to Moscow, where he became the deputy chief of the Soviet government's new department of education, the People's Commissariat of Enlightenment.

Pokrovsky played a leading role in the early Soviet educational establishment, editing several of the major historical journals of the period, and guiding the restructuring of the higher education system and its personnel as head of the Institute of Red Professors. He was also the author of influential and pioneering works of Russian history, presenting semi-official reinterpretations of the Russian past presented through the lens of class struggle and the progress of history through concrete stages of development. Pokrovsky was harshly critical of the nature of the multi-national Tsarist empire and deemphasized the personal role played by individuals such as the modernizing Tsar Peter the Great.

== Biography ==
=== Early years ===
Mikhail Pokrovsky was born August 29, 1868, in Moscow into the family of a state official who had gained hereditary nobility from the Tsar. He was well educated as a boy, completing work at a classical gymnasium before enrolling in the History Department of Moscow University at the age of 19, where he studied under Vasily Klyuchevsky and Paul Vinogradov, two of the most renowned historians of the era. He would graduate from that institution in 1891, going on to pursue a Master's degree with Klyuchevsky; this work was not completed due to personal differences.

Undeterred by his lack of an advanced academic degree, Pokrovsky began teaching in secondary schools and university extension programs, pursuing his ambition of becoming a professional historian. He did not gain a university teaching position, however, instead being forced to settle for teaching history courses in secondary schools, evening extension courses, and non-university courses for women. A young man of progressive sympathies, Pokrovsky was finally prohibited from giving public lectures in 1902 owing to his radical views.

Specifics of Pokrovsky's early political activity are sparse, with Pokrovsky himself acknowledging many years after the fact that he had participated in the Union of Liberation, a middle class organization seeking the establishment of a constitution for Russia that was a forerunner of the Constitutional-Democratic Party (Cadets).

=== From 1905 to 1917 ===
Pokrovsky became a Marxist during the Russian Revolution of 1905, joining the Bolshevik faction of the Russian Social Democratic Labor Party. He was invited by party leader V.I. Ulianov (Lenin) to contribute to the party's official newspaper published in exile, Proletarii (The Proletarian).

Inside the Bolshevik organization, Pokrovsky was close to the radical faction surrounding Alexander Bogdanov, the Vpered (Forward) group. Other key members of this faction included future Bolshevik education chief Anatoly Lunacharsky and prominent writer Maxim Gorky. In 1906, Pokrovsky published Economic Materialism, a pamphlet in outlining his views on how Marxist history should be written.

The failure of the 1905 revolution caused Pokrovsky to emigrate, first to Finland, before making his way to France in 1908. Pokrovsky would remain in French exile until the coming of the October Revolution in 1917. It was in French exile that Pokrovsky wrote his first major historiographic work, The History of Russia from Earliest Times, published in five volumes from 1910 to 1913.

Bogdanov and the Vperedists established a Marxist party school on the Italian island of Capri early in 1909, with a view to educating and training ordinary working class Russians as future party leaders, intending the project to be open to adherents of the Bolshevik and Menshevik organizations alike. Pokrovsky was called upon as a party academic to lecture at the Capri school on the topic of Russian history.

The Vperedists in exile established a second Russian party school in Bologna, Italy from 1910 to 1911, again seeking participation from both Bolshevik and Menshevik wings of the Russian Social Democratic Labor Party. Pokrovsky again participated in this project as a history lecturer, being joined by Lunacharsky, Bogdanov, and others. Chief factional leaders Lenin and Georgy Plekhanov were hostile to the project, however, and the Bologna school — and with it the Vpered group itself — subsequently disintegrated.

After Bogdanov's expulsion from the Bolshevik fraction within the Russian Social Democratic Labor Party in 1909, Pokrovsky followed him out of that organization. He would remain a non-Bolshevik radical until the revolutionary year of 1917, when he returned to Russia in August 1917, following the February Revolution, which overthrew Tsar Nicholas II. He was formally readmitted to the Bolshevik Party the following month and was soon in a position of trust and authority, editing the daily newspaper of the Moscow Soviet, Izvestiia. He became a member of the Moscow Soviet of Workers' and Soldiers' Deputies.

=== Years after the October Revolution ===
Following the October Revolution which brought the Bolshevik Party to power, Pokrovsky was named as Commissar for Foreign Affairs of the Moscow Soviet. He was also chosen for the commission which drafted the first Constitution of Soviet Russia in 1918 and in March 1918 was elected Chairman of the Council of People's Commissars for the Moscow region.

When former Vperedist Anatoly Lunacharsky was tapped as the first head of the People's Commissariat of Enlightenment (successor to the Russian Ministry of Public Education), Lenin directly suggested to him that his own wife, Nadezhda Krupskaya, and Pokrovsky should be included as prime organizers with Lunacharsky of the new government body. Pokrovsky would become Deputy Commissar of the reformed educational ministry in May 1918, overseeing direction of that body during Lunacharsky's frequent absences from Moscow during the rest of 1918.

Pokrovsky again ran afoul of charges of oppositionism in 1919 when he lent his support to Nikolai Bukharin and the Left Communists in opposition to the Treaty of Brest-Litovsk — a matter of bitter and divisive debate within the Russian Communist Party.

=== Impact on Soviet institutions ===
Several Soviet educational entities are credited in some measure to Pokrovsky's influence. These include the "workers' faculties" (rabfaki) established to provide college preparatory education for factory workers to allow their admission to higher education without having completed a formal secondary education. In 1918 he was the founding rector of the Socialist Academy of Social Sciences, later renamed the Communist Academy. Pokrovsky was also instrumental in the establishment of the Institute of Red Professors (IKP), a de facto graduate school for the advanced training of historians, economists, philosophers, jurists, and natural scientists. He was head of the IKP from 1921 to 1931.

Pokrovsky also wrote a Brief History of Russia, published in 1920 to much acclaim from Vladimir Lenin, who said in the preface to the first edition that he "like[d] the book immensely".

Pokrovsky also was a co-founder of the Russian Association of Social Science Research Institutes (RANION), a think tank which allowed non-Marxist scholars to engage in sociological research projects. Pokrovsky was a consistent advocate of bringing moderate critics of the regime into the educational establishment, unsuccessfully attempting to gain teaching positions at Moscow University for prominent Menshevik intellectuals Iulii Martov and Nikolai Sukhanov.

In 1925 Pokrovsky was chosen as the first president of the Society of Marxist Historians and was for a time also the editor of its journal, Istorik-marksist. He was also a founder of the Central State Archives of the RSFSR and the editor of its journal, Krasnyi arkhiv (Red Archive), one of the major scholarly history publications of the Soviet 1920s.

His influence was at its peak during the first and only All-Union Conference of Marxist Historian held in December 1928 and January 1929, when, to quote the historian Konstantin Shteppa:

Pokrovsky had become dictatorial chief-of-staff on the historical front. His every word was law. His authority in questions of Marxist historical theory was incontrovertible ... Among the living, he had no rivals.

In 1929, Pokrovsky was elected to the Soviet Academy of Sciences. He achieved his highest position in the Communist Party apparatus the following year, when he was named as a member of the presidium of the Central Control Commission, a disciplinary body elected and sitting in parallel to the governing Central Committee of the Russian Communist Party. Pokrovsky was also a member of the All-Union and All-Russian Central Executive Committees of Soviets, officially non-party bodies which atrophied in importance over time.

=== Historical ideas ===
In his own historigraphic writing, Pokrovsky emphasized Marxist theory and the brutality of the upper classes. He repeatedly described the Russian Empire as "a prison of peoples". In his Russian History from the Most Ancient Times (1910–13), he wrote that "Great Russia was built on the bones of the non-Russian nations...in the past we Russians were the greatest robbers on earth".

He also downplayed the role of personality in favor of economics and the class struggle as the driving force of history. An example was his analysis of the destruction of the Boyar class, the owners of large feudal estates, during the reign of Ivan the Terrible, which Pokrovsky attributed to the development of a market economy that favoured smaller, more efficient estates, whose owners allied with townspeople in 1564 to overthrow the boyars, which, he argued, would have happened whoever was on the throne.

Of Peter the Great, Pokrovsky wrote: "Peter, whom fawning historians have called the Great ... lowered the well-being (of the populace) terribly and led to a colossal increase in the death rate".

=== Death and discredit ===
Mikhail Pokrovsky died of cancer on April 10, 1932. His ashes were buried at the Kremlin Wall Necropolis. Though there had been some criticism of him in the early 1930s, he continued to be honoured posthumously for two years after his death. His name was given to the Leningrad Pedagogical Institute and the Novgorod Agro-Pedagogical Institute. Also from October 20, 1932, to November 11, 1937, Moscow State University bore his name. His name was given to the Vologda Pedagogical School. In some cities (in particular, in Izhevsk), to this day there are streets named after Pokrovsky.

But a "new period in the development of Soviet historiography began on May 16, 1934" with the publication of a decree that criticised the way history was being taught in Soviet schools and universities. Dozens of scholars were put to the task of writing a new standard history textbook in 1934 and 1935. The decree followed a discussion in March by the Politburo of the Russian Communist Party that took up the question of national history textbooks, with General Secretary Joseph Stalin forcefully opining that Pokrovsky's influence had been decisive in propagating an overly abstract and schematic presentation of national history.

Though the decree did not mention Pokrovsky by name, its effect was to discredit the entire school of history that he had led. In January 1936 another history textbook commission was launched, this chaired by Andrei Zhdanov and including a number of top Communist Party functionaries, including Nikolai Bukharin, Karl Radek, Yakov Yakovlev, and Karl Bauman, among others. In conjunction with the work of this commission, Bukharin authored a lengthy critique of Pokrovsky and his methodology, accusing the deceased historian of mechanistic adherence to abstract sociological formulas, failure to properly understand and apply the dialectic method, and a tendency to depict history as a crudely universal process. The Zhdanov Commission, in consultation with Stalin, issued an influential communique which categorized historians of the Pokrovsky school as conduits of harmful ideas that were at root "anti-Marxist, anti-Leninist, essentially liquidatorist, and anti-scientific."

The posthumous campaign attacked Pokrovsky above all for his lack of Russian patriotism. The article on Pokrovsky in the first edition of the Great Soviet Encyclopedia (1940), signed S. Kovalev, declared that his conception of history "distorts proletarian internationalism in a leftist manner" and was "deprived of the feeling of love for the motherland"; that he had treated Peter the Great as "simply a despot and petty tyrant, called the Great by the historians out of a misunderstanding"; that he had "failed to understand the progressive significance of the adoption of Christianity in Kievan Rus'"; and that he had "sought to blacken the great Russian commander Kutuzov" and "reviled the ardent patriot of his motherland, Bagration". The entry concluded that his conception had, "to the joy of the enemies of the Soviet people", struck out everything heroic in the Russian past, including its "struggle against external enemies", and described his former pupils as "now-unmasked Trotskyite–Bukharinite bandits". Historians have described the campaign as part of the broader rehabilitation of Russian national heroes and pre-revolutionary state-building in Soviet ideology of the late 1930s.

Pokrovsky's relentless attack on the Tsarist old regime as a "prison of peoples" and "international gendarme" was henceforth deemed to be anti-patriotic "national nihilism" and a new Russian nationalist historical orthodoxy was established. This new official orthodoxy remained in place for the duration of Stalin's life.

Pokrovsky's life's work was comprehensively trashed in two collections of essays, Against the Historical Conceptions of M.N.Pokrovsky and Against the Anti-Marxist Conceptions of M.N.Pokrovsky, published in 1939 and 1940 respectively, when the new school of history honoured past military heroes and emphasised the positive effects of the spread of Russian rule. In the 1939 volume, Anna Pankratova, who was emerging as one of the authoritative Stalinist historians, wrote that:

The so-called 'School of Pokrovsky' was not accidentally the basis for wrecking on the part of enemies of the people unmasked by the NKVD, on the part of the Trotsky–Bukharinist hirelings of Fascism, wreckers, spies and terrorists, cleverly disguised with the help of the anti-Leninist conception of M.N.Pokrovsky.

In 1942, during the war with Germany, another volume, Twenty Five Years of Historical Scholarship in the USSR, one of the contributors summarised what Pokrovsky had allegedly got wrong:

Prokovsky does not speak of the national significance of the Livonian War. He explains the victory of Ivan the Terrible on the basis of numerical superiority alone. He gives the interests of "merchant capitalism" as the sole reason for the wars of Peter I ... and took no note of the military talents of Peter himself, whom he depicted as a coarse soldier, completely devoid of the characteristics of a great statesman. Pokrovsky denied entirely the actual popular nature of the Fatherland War of 1812. His understanding of World War I, 1914–1918, was completely wrong – he believed that the aggressor in it was Russia and her allies and not the Germany of Wilhelm II. The entire history of the Russian state from antiquity to the twentieth century he imagined as piratic forays by a plunderer of constantly increasing strength. He denied any national or progressive significance behind the wars of the Russian people.

=== Posthumous intellectual rehabilitation ===
Only after the Soviet leader's death and the subsequent renunciation of his policies by the Communist Party did Pokrovsky's work regain some influence among academic historians in the USSR. Although regarded as a rigid Marxist polemicist by his critics, Pokrovsky is also acknowledged as a "conscientious scholar who would not sacrifice intellectual honesty to the demands of propaganda" by others, leaving his an ambiguous legacy.

After the 22nd Congress of the CPSU in 1961, historians inside the Soviet Union began to challenge official historiographic orthodoxies with some vigor. While some tentative efforts by historians to restore Pokrovsky's reputation had begun as early as 1957, in 1960 and 1961 the prominent journal Istoriia SSSR [History of the USSR] began a discussion on the periodization of Soviet history in which revisionists, headed by M.V. Nechkina, drew upon published and unpublished work by Pokrovsky in making a circumspect case for significant separation of historical research from the exigencies of contemporary pollitics.

At the 22nd Congress itself, chief party ideologist L.F. Ilichev declared:

"In the period of the personality cult some quit inexplicable things occurred, such as suppressing the names of leading scholars. This was the fate of the eminent Marxist historian and Old Bolshevik M.N. Pokrovsky. In his scholarly and political activity there were no few mistakes. this is true and account should be taken of it. But it is well known that he defended Marxism and made a great contribution to the writing of Russian history."

Historian John Keep has argued that Pokrovsky's reputation as one who dismisses the role of the individual in history is overblown:

"Although [Pokrovsky] is usually regarded, not without reason, as a crass economic determinist, his attitude was really much more subtle. It is true that Pokrovsky minimized the role of Russian rulers, generals, and saints, some of whom Stalin later resurrected and even glorified. But he was also willing to recognize that revolutionary leaders and elites could decisvely alter the shape of events, and he regarded the October Revolution as a supreme example of this."

== See also ==
- Soviet historiography
- World-systems theory

== Works ==
- 7 let proletarskoi diktatury (7 years of proletarian dictatorship). Moscow: Gosudarstvennoe Izdatel'stvo, n.d. (1924).
- History of Russia From the Earliest Times to the Rise of Commercial Capitalism. D.S. Mirsky, trans. New York: International Publishers, 1931.
- Brief History of Russia, Volume II. D.S. Mirsky, trans. New York: International Publishers, 1933.
- Izbrannye proizvedeniia v chetyrekh knigakh (Selected Works in four volumes). Moscow: Mysl, 1966.
- Russia in World History: Selected Essays. Roman Szporluk and Mary Ann Szporluk, ed. and trans. Ann Arbor, MI: University of Michigan Press, 1970.

Political offices
Preceded by Victor Nogin	Mayor of Moscow; November 1917 – March 1918	Succeeded by Pyotr Smidovich
