= Rabfak =

Type of educational institution in the Soviet Union

A photograph of a rabfak.

Rabfak (from Russian: рабфак, a syllabic abbreviation of Рабочий факультет, Rabochiy fakul′tet, "workers' faculty") was a type of educational institution in the Soviet Union which prepared Soviet workers and peasants to enter institutions of higher education. Such institutions were present in every faculty and institute for higher learning and tended to contain a density of members of either the Komsomol or the VKP(B). The rabfaki were created by Mikhail Pokrovskii in March 1919 and were active until the 1940s. They were intended for adults who had received little formal schooling and were intended as a fulfilment of the promises of the Revolution for upwards social mobility for workers and peasants.

== See also ==
- Remedial education
