= Yehoshua Yakhot =

Soviet university professor

Yehoshua Yakhot (Russian: Иегошуа Яхот/Овший Овшиевич Яхот; 2 March 1919, in Yaryshev, Vinnitskaya, Ukrainian People's Republic – 21 December 2003, in Tel Aviv) was a professor of philosophy in the Soviet Union.

== Biography ==
Yakhot was enrolled at the Moscow Institute of Philosophy, Literature, and History when Nazi Germany invaded the Soviet Union. He volunteered to join the Red Army on 22 June 1941, the day of the invasion. Yakhot was wounded in a Luftwaffe attack near Ostashkov.

He studied philosophy at Moscow State University and received an undergraduate degree in 1943. joined the Communist Party of the Soviet Union in 1946 and obtained his graduate degree at the Moscow State Pedagogical Institute in 1947. From 1947, he taught at the Moscow Finance Institute. He completed his doctorate in 1965, and a Professor in 1966. Yakhot was a devoted Marxist and supported the de-Stalinization that followed Nikita Khrushchev's On the Cult of Personality and Its Consequences speech to the 20th Congress of the Communist Party of the Soviet Union in February 1956. During the Khrushchev Thaw, he rejected Joseph Stalin politically and saw him as a "poor philosopher."

In 1981 he was forced to emigrate to Israel.

== Works ==
- What is dialectical materialism?
- The basic principles of dialectical and historical materialism
- Materialist view on reality
- Philosophy of the new world
- The Suppression of Philosophy in the USSR (The 1920s and 1930s) (1981)
