= For a Lasting Peace, for a People's Democracy! =

Newspaper published by the Cominform from 1947 to 1956

13 March 1953 issue of For a Lasting Peace, for a People's Democracy! covering the funeral of Joseph Stalin. Leaders shown at the podium, from left to right; Gheorghe Gheorghiu-Dej, Bolesław Bierut, Pak Chong-ae, Walter Ulbricht, Dolores Ibárruri, Otto Grotewohl, Valko Chervenkov, Mátyás Rákosi, Pietro Nenni, Palmiro Togliatti, Jacques Duclos, Klement Gottwald, Nikolai Bulganin, Vyacheslav Molotov, Kliment Voroshilov, Georgy Malenkov, Nikita Khrushchev, Lavrentiy Beria, Maksim Saburov, Zhou Enlai, Mikhail Pervukhin, Lazar Kaganovich, Nikolai Shvernik, Anastas Mikoyan.

For a Lasting Peace, for a People's Democracy! was the press organ of the Information Bureau of the Communist and Workers' Parties (Cominform). The first issue was published on 1 November 1947 from the Yugoslav capital of Belgrade. Due to the Tito–Stalin split, the last issue to be published from Belgrade came out in June 1948; from July 1948 onwards the newspaper was published from Bucharest, Romania, after a decision of the Second Cominform Conference to move the editorial office out of Belgrade.

The newspaper sought to promote exchanges between communist parties. The publication was banned by the French government in early 1951, after which a new French-language edition titled Paix et démocratie ('Peace and Democracy') began to be published in France.

During the second Cominform meeting on 1 February 1948 in Belgrade, a permanent editorial board was chosen for the newspaper. This editorial board was under the leadership of Pavel Yudin. He was succeeded by Mark Mitin, after the Yugoslav expulsion. The publication of For a Lasting Peace, for a People's Democracy! ended in April 1956.

== Different Languages ==
Published weekly, it was issued in English, and under different titles, in the following languages:

- French: Pour une paix durable, pour une democratie populaire!
- Russian: За прочный мир, за народную демократию!
- Bulgarian: За траен мир, за народна демокрация!
- German: Für dauerhaften Frieden, für Volksdemokratie!
- Spanish: ¡Por una paz duradera, por una democracia popular!
- Czech: Za trvalý mír, za lidovou demokracii!
- Hungarian: Tartós békéért, népi demokráciáért!
- Polish: O trwały pokój, o demokrację ludową!

Initially, there had also been a Serbo-Croatian language edition: Za trajan mir, za narodnu demokratiju!

The first Serbo-Croatian issue of 10 November 1947
