= Leonid Ilyichev (politician) =

Soviet politician and journalist (1906–1990)

Leonid Fyodorovich Ilyichev
- Леони́д Фёдорович Ильичёв
- Ilyichev in 1963

Editor-in-Chief of Pravda
- In office 23 June 1951 – November 1952
- Preceded by: Mikhail Suslov
- Succeeded by: Dmitri Shepilov

Head of the Press Department of the Ministry of Foreign Affairs of the USSR
- In office 1953–1958

Head of the Propaganda and Agitation Department of the Central Committee of the CPSU
- In office 1958 – December 1961

Member of the Central Committee of the CPSU
- In office 31 October 1961 – 29 March 1966

Head of the Ideological Department of the Central Committee of the CPSU
- In office 20 December 1962 – May 1965
- Preceded by: Office established (Fyodor Konstantinov as Propaganda and Agitation Department head)
- Succeeded by: Pyotr Demichev

Deputy Minister of Foreign Affairs of the USSR
- In office 1965–1989

Personal details
- Born: 15 March 1906 Yekaterinodar, Russian Empire
- Died: 18 August 1990 (aged 84) Moscow, Russian SFSR, Soviet Union
- Party: Communist Party of the Soviet Union
- Education: North Caucasian Communist University; Institute of Red Professors

Leonid Fyodorovich Ilyichev (Note: Russian: Леони́д Фёдорович Ильичёв) (15 March [O.S. 2 March] 1906 – 17 August 1990) was a Soviet philosopher, journalist and politician who held several editorial and political offices throughout his career. He served as the Editor-in-Chief of Pravda from 1951 to 1952, the Head of the Department of Propaganda of the Central Committee from 1958 to 1961, and Head of the Ideological Department of the Central Committee from 1961 to 1965.

== Early life and career ==
Ilyichev was born in Yekaterinodar, Kuban Oblast, Russian Empire on 15 March 1906. In 1924 he joined the Communist Party of the Soviet Union. In 1930 he graduated from the North Caucasus Communist University, and in 1937 graduated from the Institute of Red Professors with a degree in philosophy. He worked as a teacher from 1930 to 1953, when he joined the Ministry of Foreign Affairs of the USSR. During this time he also worked in the press, ascending to become the Editor-in-Chief of Pravda and Izvestia.

== In the Government ==
=== Press department ===
In April 1956, the Polish-Yiddish newspaper Folks-Sztyme published an article entitled “Undzer veytik un undzer treyst" (Our Pain and Our Consolation), which outlined the extent of Stalin's repression of Yiddish culture during the 'anti-cosmopolitan campaign'. Ilyichev, acting without permission to comment on the article, strongly opposed it, and called it "slanderous and anti-Soviet" on the grounds that the damage done to the Yiddish community was similar to that done to all other ethnic communities in the Soviet Union under Stalin. While he claimed much of the article was fallacious, he stayed silent on what aspects were untrue after Folks-Sztyme published an open response asking for clarification.

Ilyichev was frequently involved in the censorship, or attempted censorship, of art and media he perceived to be anti-Soviet or anti-socialist realism. After the death of John F. Kennedy, Melor Sturua writing for Izvestia published an image of the president in a black frame, a mark typically reserved for deceased Politburo members. For this, Ilyichev unsuccessfully attempted to expel Surura from the CPSU. As art in the Soviet Union became more experimental during the Khrushchev Thaw, Ilyichev took a hard stance against new art which deviated from state ideals.

Ilyichev became a member of the Department of Economic, Philosophical and Legal Sciences (philosophy) of the Russian Academy of Sciences on June 19 1962.

=== Department of Propaganda and Ideological Commission ===
While in these positions, Ilyichev continued to be greatly involved in Soviet art, especially in censoring works. He believed that artists were beholden to the people, and as the party represented the people, must be fully in line with party ideology with no exceptions. He played a part in the suppression of Sergey Mikaelyan's film I Accept the Challenge, and consulted the creators of A Hot July. He also recommended that the Union of Soviet Writers, Union of Russian Composers, and Artists' Union of the USSR be merged, seemly to make it more difficult for reformers to gain power.

=== Foreign ministry ===
Ilyichev frequently traveled to the People's Republic of China, as the Soviet Union tested the potential for a reconciliation for the Sino-Soviet split. Ilyichev would make several uneventful visits to the country in 1974 and 1975. His most notable visit occurred in early October 1982, Ilyichev was sent as the head of an envoy to China for preliminary political consultations between China and the Soviet Union. General Secretary Leonid Brezhnev believed that the meetings could provide "common sense, mutual respect and mutual advantage", and hoped they could serve as a basis for reconciliation of the Sino-Soviet split. The consultations covered three key disputes China had with the Soviet Union: the Union's support of the Vietnamese occupation of Cambodia, the stationing of Soviet troops in the People's Republic of Mongolia, and the high number of Soviet troops on the Chinese border. Ilyichev's counterpart from China was Minister of Foreign Affairs Qian Qichen, the two frequently speaking with each other both within and outside formal meetings. Little was accomplished during the initial conference, however Qian considers it to be the first step to normalized relations between the Soviet Union and China. Ilyichev would continue traveling to China to lead normalization talks, meeting with Wu Xueqian in October 1983, and Qian again in October 1985.

During the late 70s and early 80s, Ilyichev was also significantly involved in diplomacy to Southern Africa. In 1982, he led the first quadripartite meetings between the USSR, Cuba, Angola, and SWAPO to discuss strategy and support.

== Honors and awards ==
Throughout his career, Ilyichev was awarded several decorations and medals for his journalistic and political works.

Lenin Prize, (1960)
Order of Lenin, three times (4 May 1962, 14 May 1986, 14 May 1986)
Order of the Red Banner of Labor, two times (15 March 1976, 14 May 1986)
Order of the October Revolution, (14 May 1986)
Order of the Patriotic War, 1st class (14 May 1986)
Order of the Badge of Honour (14 May 1986)
