= Anna Pankratova =

Soviet historian (1897-1957)

- Анна Панкратова
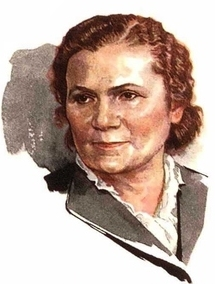
- Portait of Pankratova from a commemorative cachet, 1977
- Born: Anna Mikhailovna Pankratova; 16 February 1897; Odessa, Kherson Governorate, Russian Empire
- Died: 25 May 1957 (aged 60); Moscow, Russian SFSR, Soviet Union
- Resting place: Novodevichy Cemetery
- Board member of: Voprosy Istorii
- Spouse: Grigory Yakovin (m. 1924–1927)
- Children: 1
- Awards: State Stalin Prize; Order of Lenin; Order of the Red Banner of Labour

Academic background
- Education: Imperial Novorossiya University
- Alma mater: Institute of Red Professors
- Thesis: (1925)
- Doctoral advisor: Mikhail Pokrovsky

Academic work
- Discipline: History
- Sub-discipline: Historical materialism
- Political party: CPSU
- Other political affiliations: Bolsheviks; Left SR; SR

Anna Mikhailovna Pankratova (Russian: Анна Михайловна Панкратова, 16 February 1897 – 25 May 1957) was a leading Soviet historian, educator and member of the Academy of Sciences of the Soviet Union. A widely published author, she was editor in chief of the influential Russian historical journal Voprosy Istorii and headed the National Committee of USSR Historians. A member of the Communist Party, she became an elected member of the Presidium of the Supreme Soviet.

== Biography ==
=== Early life and education ===
Pankratova was born in Odessa, Odessa uezd. Her father, a soldier, died when she was nine. Her mother worked as a laborer. Despite growing up in poverty, she completed school and graduated in history from the Imperial Novorossiya University in 1917.

In her teens, Pankratova joined the Socialist Revolutionary Party, and when the party split in 1917, joined the Left SRs, who supported the October Revolution, and worked for them underground in Odessa during the civil war. She switched to the Bolsheviks in 1919. She left Odessa in 1920 to work for the communist party, and in 1922 began a three year course at the Institute of Red Professors.

At the Institute, Pankratova met and married a fellow student, Grigory Yakovin, whom the writer Victor Serge described as "a sporting enthusiast with a constantly alert intelligence, good looks, and a spontaneous charm". They had a daughter, Maya, born in 1925, the year they both graduated. They traveled abroad together on a scientific mission in Germany and France. In 1927, she ended her marriage and denounced her husband as a supporter of the left opposition, led by Leon Trotsky. He was expelled from the communist party and arrested. She visited Yakovin in prison in Tashkent, in 1929, in the hope of persuading to renounce the opposition, but he refused. He was later shot.

=== Career ===
From 1926, Pankratova taught at a variety of high-level institutions, including the Soviet Academy of Social Sciences, the Sverdlov Communist University, the Lenin Political-Military Academy, Moscow State University, Saratov State University, Moscow State Pedagogical University and at the Academy of Sciences of the Soviet Union.

In August 1936, after the first of the Moscow Show Trials, which marked the start of the Great Purge, Pankratova was expelled from the Communist Party and the Institute of Red Professors because of her past association with Yakovin and other Trotskyites. She made a fulsome expression of guilt, accusing herself of "rotten liberalism" and "not being able to expose the enemy in disguise." Sacked from her academic post, she was unemployed for several months, and contemplated suicide, before being given a post in Saratov University, which meant three years' separation from her mother and her daughter, who remained in Moscow. She was reinstated in the party in 1938, and permitted to resume publishing as a historian.

Previously, Pankratova had considered herself to be a pupil of Mikhail Pokrovsky, the Soviet Union's leading historian, who was her teacher at the Institute of Red Professors. When he died, in 1932, she recalled how "we, his pupils, considered his historical conception not only completely Marxist, but without forerunners." But she radically changed her mind after Joseph Stalin had ruled that Pokrovsky had been wrong in believing that the Russian Empire was a "prison of nations", in which the non-Russian minorities were enslaved, and that he had failed to understand how great leaders such as Ivan the Terrible and Peter the Great changed history. In 1939, she wrote that:

The so-called 'School of Pokrovsky' was not accidentally the basis for wrecking on the part of enemies of the people unmasked by the NKVD, on the part of the Trotsky-Bukharinist hirelings of Fascism, wreckers, spies and terrorists, cleverly disguised with the help of the anti-Leninist conception of M.N.Pokrovsky.

Pankratova joined the Academy of Sciences of the Soviet Union's Institute of History in 1939. In World War II, she was evacuated with a number of other eminent historians to Alma-Ata in Kazakhstan. In 1942, they published a collection of essays, Twenty Five Years of Historical Scholarship in the USSR, which she edited, which again comprehensively renounced Pokrovsky's view of history.

Under her leadership, they also wrote The History of the Kazakh SSR. Published in 1949, the work was the first of its kind, describing the history of a Soviet Republic from its origins to the start of the Second World War. Edited by Pankratova, it inspired further research into the history of pre-Soviet and Soviet peoples. From 1953 to 1957, Pankratova was the editor of the Soviet historical journal Voprosy istorii.

Throughout her career, Pankratova attended international congresses, including those in Warsaw (1934), Budapest (1953) and Rome (1955). She also chaired the Soviet branch of the Association for Cooperation with the United Nations (1955–57). She was elected a member of the Central Committee of the Communist Party of the Soviet Union at the 19th and 20th Congresses in 1952 and 1953.

=== Death ===
Anna Pankratova died of a heart attack in Moscow on 25 May 1957.

== Publications ==
The histories written by Pankratova document in particular the development of the Russian workers' movement and of Soviet society in general. In addition to their appearance in Russian, several of her works were translated, especially into German. The three volumes of A History of the U.S.S.R. were first published in English in 1943 and reprinted in 1970.

== Awards ==
Pankratova's awards include the Stalin Prize (1946), Order of Lenin, and two Orders of the Red Banner of Labour.
