= Mark Mitin =

Soviet philosopher

- Марк Митин
- Born: 5 July 1901
- Died: 15 January 1987 (aged 85)
- Resting place: Novodevichy Cemetery
- Occupation: Academic
- Board member of: Marx–Engels–Lenin Institute

Academic background
- Education: Institute of Red Professors

Academic work
- Era: 20th century
- Discipline: History
- Sub-discipline: Philosophy of history, dialectical and historical materialism

Signature
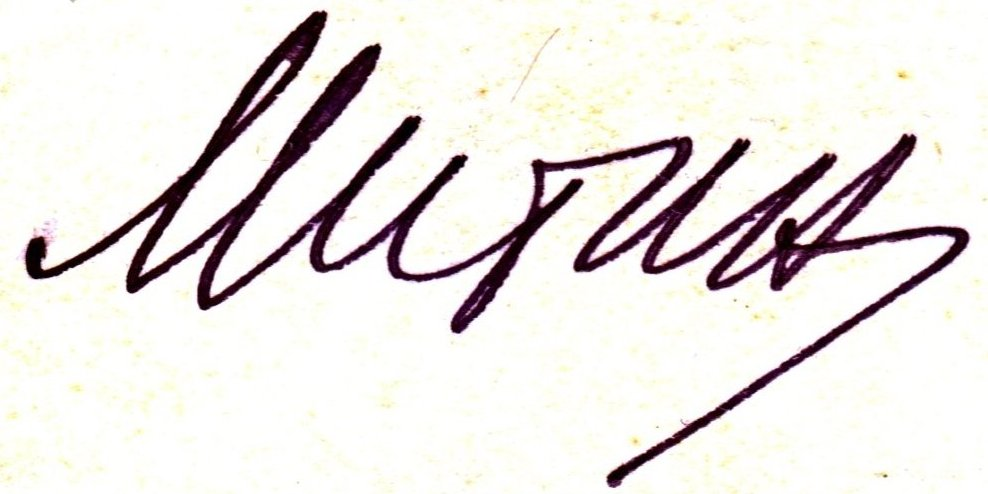

Mark Borisovich Mitin (Russian: Марк Борисович Митин; 5 July 1901 – 15 January 1987) was a Soviet Marxist–Leninist philosopher, university lecturer and Professor of Philosophy Faculty of Moscow State University (1964–1968, 1978–1985). He was interested primarily dialectical and historical materialism, the philosophy of history and criticism of bourgeois philosophy.

== Biography ==
He came from a Jewish working-class family. Mitin became a member of the Russian Communist Party (Bolsheviks) in 1919. In the years 1925-1929 he studied philosophy at the Institute of Red Professors, which had the responsibility for educating a new Soviet intelligentsia. In the years 1939-1961 he was a member of the Central Committee of the Communist Party of the Soviet Union and during the period 1950-1962 deputy of the Supreme Soviet of the USSR.

From 1939, for five years he was director of the Institute of Marxism–Leninism of the CPSU Central Committee. From 1944 to 1950 he served on the editorial board of the journal Bolshevik (Большевик). From 1950 to 1956 he worked in Bucharest as the editor-in-chief of the official newspaper of the Cominform, For a Lasting Peace, for a People's Democracy!.

From 1960 to 1968, Mitin was the editor-in-chief of the journal Problems of Philosophy. He was deputy Academician-Secretary of the Department of Philosophy and Law of the Soviet Academy of Sciences (1963–1967), worked at the Institute of Sociology of the Academy of Sciences (1968–1970) and headed a sector at the Institute of State and Law of the Academy of Sciences (1970–1985).

Mitin died in January 1987 and was buried at the Novodevichy Cemetery in Moscow.

== New philosophy ==
In the 1920s a debate raged within Soviet Dialectical Materialism between the Mechanists and the Dialecticians of the Deborin School. Deborin was initially victorious, but he was criticized by Mitin for "Menshevizing idealism." Mitin led the Red Professors in ousting Deborin. Mitin insisted that Deborin lacked Party Spirit and did not recognize the unity of theory and praxis.

== Works ==
Books

- Hegel and the Theory of Materialist Dialectics, (1932)
- Historical Materialism: Textbook Part II (1932)
- Dialectical Materialism: Textbook Part I (1934)
- The Fighting Questions of Materialist Dialectics (1936)
- Dialectical Materialism: The Worldview of the Marxist-Leninist Party (1941)
- Marx and Engels on Reactionary Prussianism, (1943)
- Twenty Five Years of Soviet Power 1917-1942
- Soviet Democracy and Bourgeois Democracy (1949)
- For a Materialist Biological Science (1949)
- The Historical Role of G. V. Plekhanov in the Russian and International Labour Movement (1957)
- Ideology and Practice of International Zionism: A Critical Analysis (1978)
- Philosophy and Social Progress: An Analysis of Modern Bourgeois Concepts of Social Progress (1979)

Articles

- Towards the Advancement of Soviet Genetics, p.37-48, The American Quarterly on the Soviet Union, Vol II, No. 4, April 1940
- The Power of Stalinist Prediction, p.141-148, The Communist, Vol. XIX, No. 2, February 1940
- Spinoza and Marxism, p.85-88, The Communist, Vol. XII, No. 1, January 1933
- The Lenin-Stalin Teaching on the Building of Socialism in One Country, p.542-552, The Communist, Vol. XVIII, No. 6, June 1939
- The Morale of the German Rear and the German Army, p.37-40, World Survey: A Periodical Review of International Affairs, Workers Library Publishers, April 1942
- Ideological Struggle Today: Alliance of Philosophy and Natural Science, p.88-96, Problems of the Contemporary World No. 47, Philosophical Concepts in Natural Science, Social Sciences Today, 1977
- Social Cognition as a Variety of Rationality, p.5-26, Problems of the Contemporary World No. 66, Philosophy and the World-Views of Modern Sciences, Social Sciences Today, 1978
- The Role and Significance of J. V. Stalin's 'Dialectical and Historical Materialism' in the Development of Marxist-Leninist Philosophical Thought 1949, Marxism and Philosophy 1, Adhunik Prakashan, India, 1951
