= Institute of Red Professors =

Soviet educational institute

- Институт красной профессуры IKP
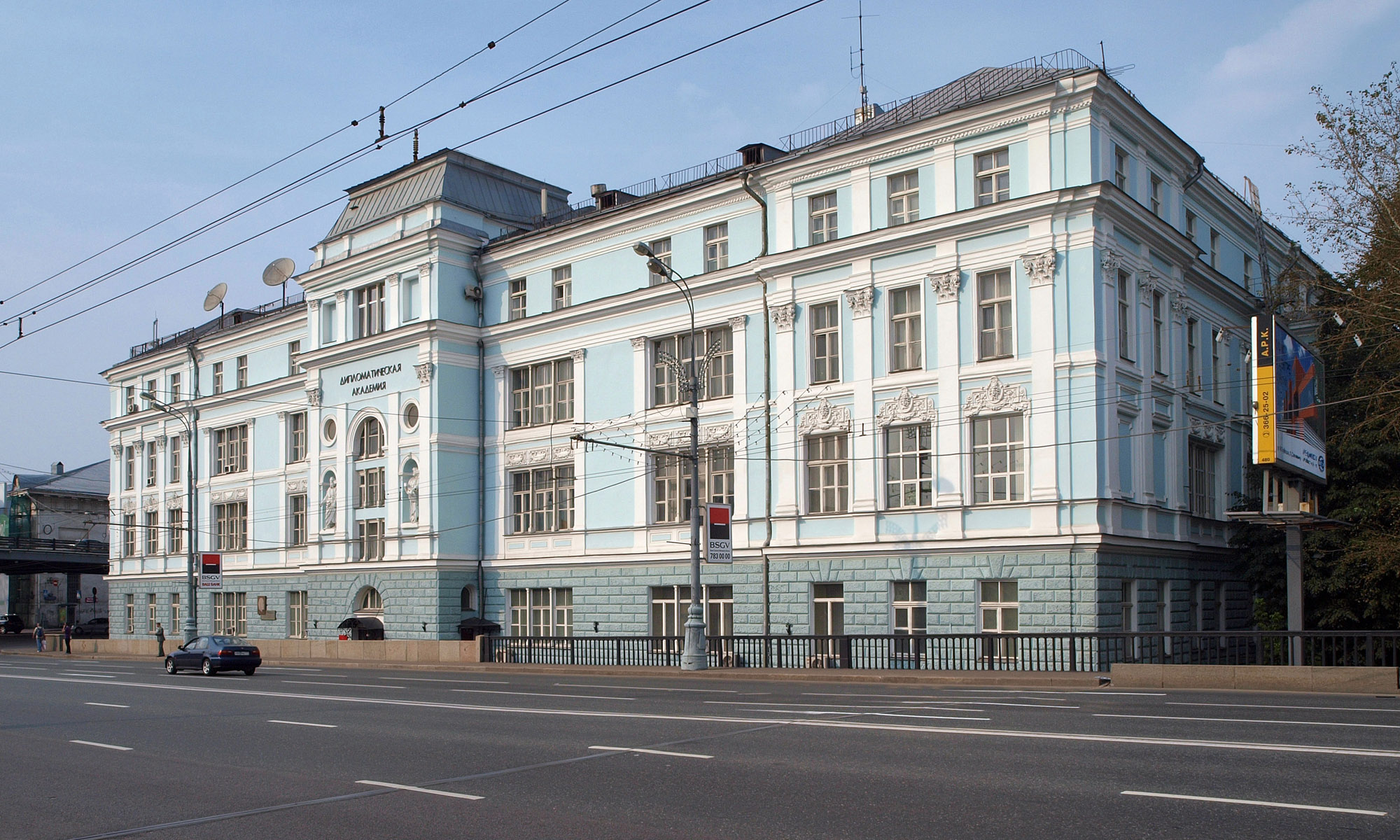
- The former building of the Institute of Red Professors, currently the Diplomatic Academy
- Type: University
- Active: February 1921–1938
- Rector: Mikhail Pokrovsky (1921–31); Pavel Yudin (1932–38)
- Location: Moscow, SFSR, USSR
- Language: Russian

The Institute of Red Professors of the All-Union Communist Party (Bolsheviks) (IKP) (Russian: Институ́т кра́сной профессу́ры, ИКП) was an institute of graduate-level education in the Marxist social sciences located in the Orthodox Convent of the Passion, Moscow.

== History ==
=== Establishment ===
The IKP was founded in February 1921 to address a shortage of Marxist academic professionals in the social sciences. The school was conceived by historian Mikhail Pokrovsky, who sought a break from the traditional method of training professors in Russia, which demanded the subservience of asprianti to their professors, who dominated a patron-client relationship with their students. Pokrovsky believed that such a system rewarded toadyism rather than talent and sought to instill meritocracy into the academic training process.

On February 11, 1921, the Council of People's Commissars of Soviet Russia adopted a resolution calling for establishment of training facilities designed to train Communist academics in the fields of history, economics, philosophy, and sociology. With Pokrovsky coordinating the organizing process, a suitable facility was located in Moscow and the application process opened for the 1921/22 academic year. A total of 289 applications were submisste the first year, from which 81 students were accepted after being scrutinized for academic ability and political suitability. Of this initial class, 75 students (93%) were members of the Russian Communist Party.

Although its initial purpose was the training of college professors, only about 25 percent of its graduates continued an academic career, with most becoming functionaries of the Communist Party.

Initially under the jurisdiction of the Central Executive Committee of the Soviet Union, the institute was later placed under control of the Department for Agitation and Propaganda (Agitprop).

=== Curriculum ===
The studies lasted four years and students (nicknamed ikapisty — that is, "IKP-ists") were required to write research papers, which were often published and represented a significant body of Marxist historical research. The term of study was initially planned to be three years, but it was soon discovered that more time would be needed for foreign language study and for the writing and defense of dissertations — consequently the period of instruction was expanded to four years effective in academic year 1924/25.

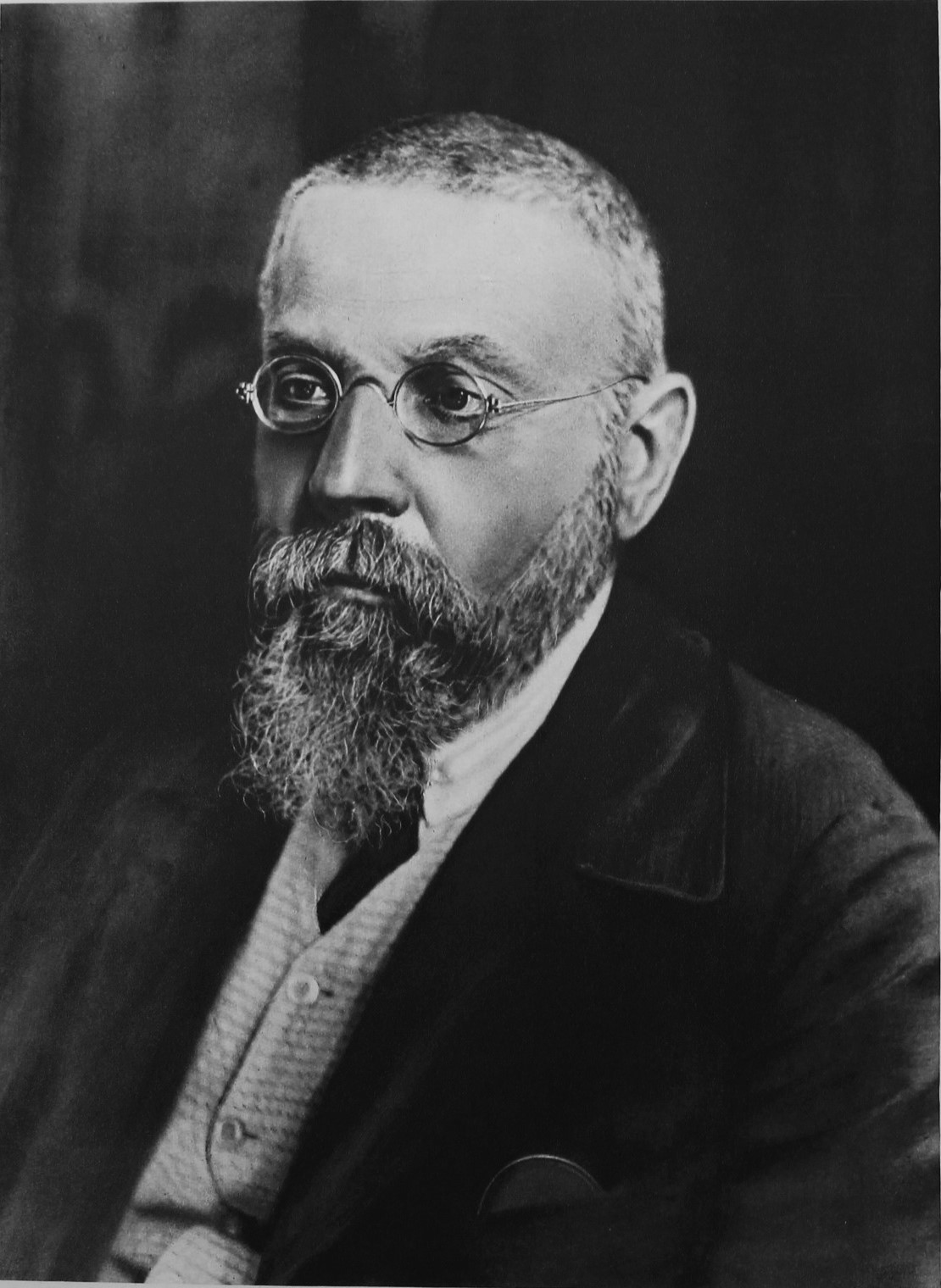
Mikhail Pokrovsky in 1930.

The core curriculum of the IKP revolved around the study of Marxism, initially involving simultaneous study of philosophy, economics, and history. After the first year it was determined that this program of study was overambitious, however, and specialization in one of these disciplines began effective with the 1922/23 academic year. The school was divided into three departments around these three disciplines until the 1924/25 academic year, when additional departments were added for natural science and law. The structure of the institute was further expanded for 1927/28, when departments were added for literature and party history.

Instruction was generally done in the seminar format, with lectures being used only for introductory purposes.

Efforts were made to increase the working class component of the student body so in 1924 a two-year preparatory department was established. This effort proved largely unsuccessful, however, as few working class students were able to complete the course of study. In all some 236 students completed the course at the IKP between 1924 and 1929, of whom 209 were white collar workers, joined by just 19 working class students and 8 hailing from the peasantry.

The school's rectors were Mikhail Pokrovsky, who led the institute from 1921 to 1931, and Pavel Yudin, the chief from 1932 until the school's termination in 1938. Department heads included Pokrovsky for history, Sh.M. Dvolaitsky for economics, A. M. Deborin for philosophy, A.A. Maksimov for natural sciences, Evgeny Pashukanis for law, V.M. Friche for literature, and B.N. Astrov, succeeded by V.V. Adoratsky, for party history.

In 1929, there were 69 teachers at the institute, seven of whom were not members of the Communist Party. Prominent communist intellectuals who taught at the school included David Riazanov, Emelian Yaroslavsky, F.A. Rothstein, and Vladimir Nevsky.

=== Ideological concerns of the regime ===
The Institute of Red Professors quickly came to represent a nest of troublesome intellectuals from the perspective of the increasingly centralized and homogenized regime. During the so-called "Literary Discussions" between radical outsider Leon Trotsky and the ruling triumvirate of Grigory Zinoviev, Lev Kamenev, and Joseph Stalin, IKP students took an active pro-Trotsky stance against the so-called "old men" of the leadership. Students around the USSR were critical of perceived persecution of Trotsky by the party establishment and were heralded by Trotsky as "a barometer which reacts most sensitively to party bureaucratism."

Trotsky was a popular figure among Soviet students in general and had a particularly devoted following among IKP students. Similarly, Nikolai Bukharin had many supporters within the student body. As Stalin gradually gained power over the party apparatus, outspoken supporters of these rivals to party leadership came under increased scrutiny. In May 1924 a purge of IKP students was conducted, resulting in the expulsion of the 15% of the student body, targeting both those who had fallen under political suspicion and those who were not members of the Communist Party.

Despite this first anti-Trotsky campaign, the Institute of Red Professors remained a center of oppositional thinkers, leading to further reprisals, with about 10% of IKP graduates expelled from the party for alleged Trotskyist sympathies in 1927/28 and a further campaign conducted against Bukharin supporters in 1928/29.

The naive radicalism of IKP students drew fire from other sectors of the emerging Communist intelligentsia more closely connected to the ruling elite, with one leading figure in the Russian Association of Proletarian Writers (RAPP) later denigrating IKP-ists as "schoolboys playing professors."

The trend towards ideological conformity accelerated in 1931, when a letter by party leader Stalin to Proletarskaia revolutsiia, the journal of party history commission Istpart, condemned abstract theorization and led to the launch of organized self-criticism (samokritika) sessions at the IKP, the Communist Academy, and other party centers of higher education. Students at the Institute were divided into brigades to provide assessments of a vast swath of the existing historical literature in light of this new criticism by the leader. Historians were especially targeted, with many subjected to attack, force to admit "error," and subsequently repressed.

=== Termination ===
The institute was abolished in 1938 and most of the faculty were arrested, tried, sentenced to death and executed by the NKVD. The institute was integrated into a system of higher party schools of the Central Committee of the Communist Party of the Soviet Union.

== Prominent Alumni ==
- Abdurakhman Avtorkhanov, historian
- Leonid Ilyichev, philosopher, ideologist, and party functionary
- Lev Mekhlis, editor-in-chief of Pravda and party functionary
- Isaak I. Mints, historian
- Mark B. Mitin, philosopher
- Anna Pankratova, historian
- Boris Ponomarev, historian, ideologist, and top party functionary
- Dmitri Shepilov, economist and party functionary
- Aleksandr Shcherbakov, party functionary
- Andrey Shestakov, historian
- Jan Sten, philosopher
- Mikhail Suslov, ideologist and top party functionary
- Nikolai Voznesensky, economist and party functionary
- Pavel Yudin, philosopher
