= Academic Trial =

1929–1931 criminal trial in Russia

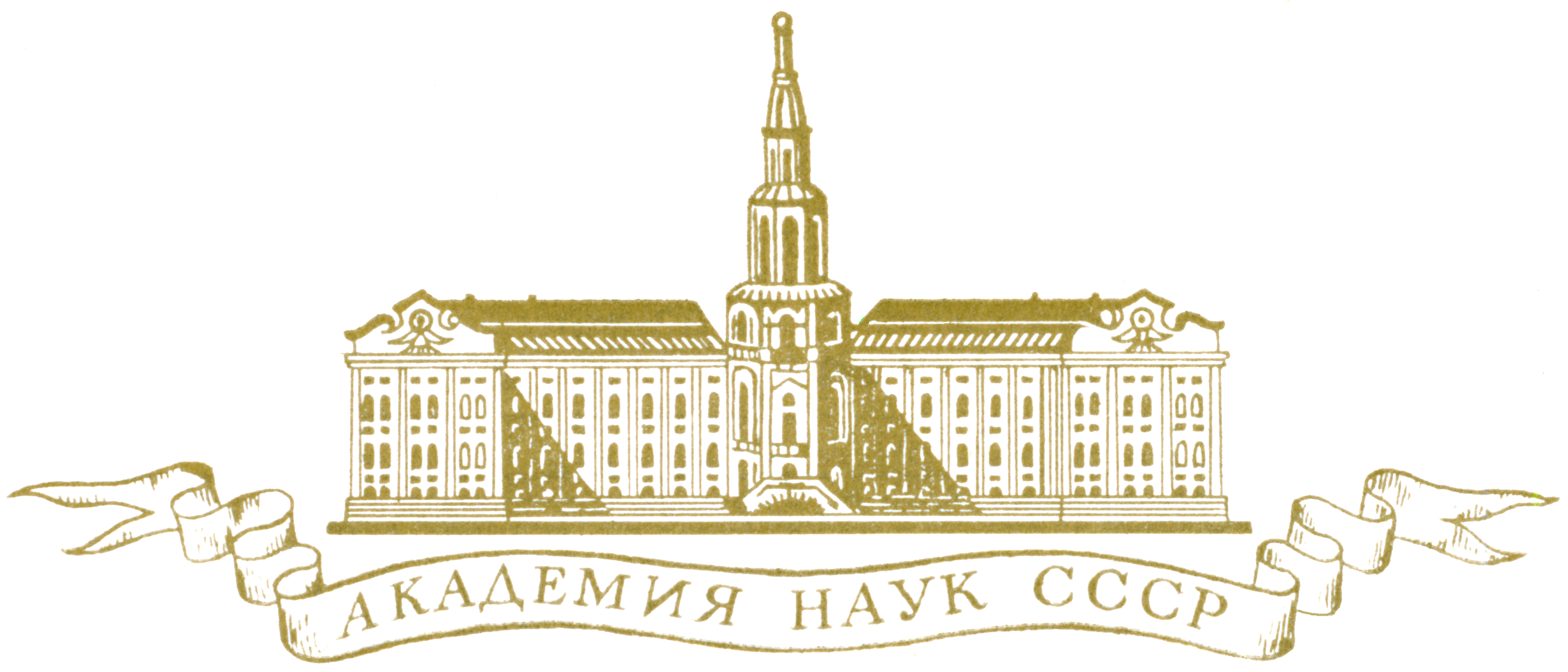
- The case of academicians of history
- Decided: 1929–1931 (Rehabilitation in 1967)

Case history
- Subsequent actions: Execution, imprisonment or exile
- Procedural history: Trial was conducted in Leningrad

Case opinions
- Majority: Scientists and local historians (Sergey Platonov, Vasily Adrianov, Vladimir Kazakevich, Nikolai Bauer, George Grigoriev and others).

The Academic Trial was a criminal trial fabricated by the Joint State Political Directorate against a group of scientists of the Academy of Sciences and local historians in 1929–1931 in Leningrad, where the Academy of Sciences was located until 1934.

== History ==
The genesis of the trial was the failure of three communist candidates to win election as members of the Academy in January 1929 among a group of 42 new academicians. Newspapers demanded the reorganization of the Academy and assailed the politics of the Academy's members, pointing to their supposedly counter-revolutionary past. However, after the election of the communists Abram Deborin, Nikolai Lukin, and Vladimir Fritsche, this campaign ceased.

The next assault on the Academy of Sciences began in August 1929, when a government commission headed by Yuri Figatner was sent to Leningrad to "clean" the Academy of Sciences. The commission ordered the dismissal of 128 full-time employees (out of 960) and 520 supernumerary employees (out of 830).

The main blow was directed at institutions headed by Sergey Platonov: the Library of the Russian Academy of Sciences and the Pushkin House. At the end of 1929, arrests of employees of the Academy, mainly archivist historians, began. In Moscow at that time, active preparations were under way for future show trials of "pests" within the Academy, in conjunction with the upcoming Industrial Party Trial held in 1930 that targeted an imaginary conspiracy by economists and scientists. The Leningrad Joint State Political Directorate began to fabricate a "monarchist counter-revolutionary organization" to use as the basis for charging scientists associated with the Academy.

In January 1930, Platonov and all his closest employees were arrested in Leningrad, as well as Yevgeny Tarle, who was accused of being an "interventionist" and a "traitor" destined to be the foreign minister in a restored capitalist government. In total, in December 1929 – December 1930, more than 100 people, mainly specialists in the humanities, were arrested. Former employees of the Academy of Sciences (Georgy Gabaev, Aleksey Arnoldi, Nikolai Antsiferov and others) who were already in exile or in custody were also implicated in the supposed conspiracy.

In order to add more substance to the organization, the prosecutors included provincial offices of the Central Bureau of Local Lore in it as branches, arresting local historians throughout the country in February – March 1930, and prisoners who had been convicted were brought to the Leningrad House of Pre-trial Detention from exile and camps. The total number involved in the case was 115 people.

An open trial did not take place. The fate of those arrested was decided out of court by the board of the Joint State Political Directorate by its resolution of August 8, 1931. 29 people were sentenced to various terms of imprisonment and exile, including Platonov, Tarle, Nikolai Likhachev, Matvei Lyubavsky (died in exile in 1936), Pushkin House staff member Nikolai Izmailov, orientalist Alexander Mervart, Sergei Rozhdestvensky (died in exile in 1934), philologist Alexander Petrov (shot in 1938), Yuri Gauthier, Sergey Bakhrushin, Dmitry Egorov (died in exile in 1931), Vladimir Beneshevich (shot in 1938), and others.

In February through August 1931, by the decisions of the OGPU, a number of former employees of various institutions of the Academy of Sciences (Alexei Kovanko, Yuri Verzhbitsky and others) were sentenced to death, imprisonment or exile:

- A group of scientists from the institutions of the Academy of Sciences, the Russian Museum, the Central Archive, and others (including Alexei Putilov, Sergey Sigrist, Nina Platonova, Fedor Skribanovich, Boris Engelhardt, Andrei Dostoevsky (the writer's nephew), Alexei Bialynitsky-Birulya, Mikhail Prisyolkov, Sergey Tkhorzhevsky, Alexander Zaozersky, and others);
- A group of employees of the Academy of Sciences related to expeditionary work (Nikolai Raevsky, Pavel Wittenburg, Dmitry Khalturin, and others);
- The so-called "church group" (priests Alexander Mitrotsky, Mikhail Mitrotsky, former professor of the Petrograd Theological Academy Alexander Brilliantov, scientific curator of the Asian Museum Mikhail Girs, and others);
- The so-called "German group" (Professor Emanuel Furman, Pastor Arnold Frischfeld, and others);
- A group of publishing workers (Ferapont Vityazev-Sedenko, Sergey and Evgenia Baranov-Halperson).

== Consequences and rehabilitation ==
The "Academic Trial" damaged historical science and local history in the Soviet Union by interrupting the training of historians, stopping research for several years, and terminating studies of Narodniks, the history of the church, the nobility, and the bourgeoisie. Soviet historians became an obedient weapon of the Soviet propaganda machine.

Rehabilitation continued until 1967.

== See also ==
- Slavists case

== Sources ==
- Leonov, Valery; Alferov, Zhores; Ananich, Zhores, eds. (1993–1998). Academic Trial, 1929–1931: Documents and Materials of an Investigation File Fabricated by the United State Political Administration. Saint Petersburg.
- Boris Ananyich, Victor Paneyakh. "Academic Trial" as a Historical Source // Historical Notes. Moscow, 1999. Issue 2 (120)
- Boris Ananyich, Victor Paneyakh. Investigation in Moscow on the "Academic Case" of 1929–1931 // Russian Historical Journal. 1999. Volume 2. No. 3
- The Case of Local Lore Scientists / Alexander Akinshin, Sergey Shchavelov // Great Russian Encyclopedia: in 35 Volumes / Editor-in-Chief Yury Osipov – Moscow: Great Russian Encyclopedia, 2004–2017
