= Nikolai Lukin =

Soviet historian (1885–1940)

- Николай Лукин
- Born: 20 July 1885; Kuskovo, Moscow County (now within the city of Moscow)
- Died: 19 July 1940 (aged 54)
- Education: Moscow University (1909)
- Scientific career
- Fields: History
- Workplaces: Moscow University, Moscow State University, Institute of History of the Academy of Sciences of the Soviet Union
- Academic advisors: Robert Wipper

Nikolai Mikhailovich Lukin (Russian: Николай Михайлович Лукин; 20 July 1885 – 19 July 1940) was a Soviet Marxist historian and publicist. He was a leader among Soviet historians in the 1930s, after the death of Mikhail Pokrovsky. (Note: Lukin became Pokrovsky's successor as director of the Institute of History of the Communist Academy. After the reorganization of research institutes in 1936, he became the first director of the Institute of History of the Academy of Sciences of the Soviet Union.)

Lukin was a member of the Russian Social Democratic Labor Party (Bolsheviks) from 1904. He was appointed an Academician of the Academy of Sciences of the Soviet Union on 13 February 1929, for the Department of Humanities (History), (Note: His was among the first ten nominations of communist candidates for academicians of the Academy of Sciences of the Soviet Union. Nominated in 1928, Lukin was among three of these candidates (with Abram Deborin and Vladimir Fritsche) who did not receive the required two-thirds of votes at the general meeting of the Academy of Sciences on 12 January 1929; they were elected by a second ballot.) expelled on 5 September 1938, and restored on 26 April 1957.

== Biography ==
Lukin was born in the village of Kuskovo in the Spasskaya volost of the Moscow Governorate (now within the city of Moscow) into the family of an elementary school teacher. Lukin was a cousin of Nikolai Bukharin; Lukin's sister, Nadezhda Mikhailovna (1887–1940), was Bukharin's first wife. (Note: In his first marriage, Bukharin was married to his cousin, Nadezhda Mikhailovna Lukina, the sister of Nikolai Lukin.) He graduated with a gold medal from the 2nd Moscow Gymnasium and entered the historical and philological faculty of Moscow University (1903).

Lukin was a member of the Revolution of 1905–1907. In 1906, he became a member of the Moscow Committee of the Russian Social Democratic Labor Party. In 1907, he was arrested and after four months of imprisonment he was exiled to Yaroslavl. At the end of 1908, he returned to Moscow and was restored at the university, from which he graduated in 1909 with a first degree diploma. His graduation work, "The Fall of the Gironde", carried out under the direction of Robert Wipper, was awarded a faculty prize. At the request of Wipper he was left at the Department of General History to prepare for the professorship. He was appointed Privatdozent (associate professor) in the same place in 1916. Many years later, Wipper recalled of him: "It was interesting and useful to deal with him (Lukin). He read a lot, appreciated the sources, plunged into their analysis ... He enthusiastically and fruitfully explored the French Revolution. His thesis 'The Fall of the Gironde' was fresh, original."

From 1915, he taught at Moscow University. He was a participant in the 1917 Revolution, when he joined the group of "Left Communists". From March 1918, he was an employee of Pravda.

In June 1918, he became a professor of the Socialist Academy (later Communist Academy ) Academy, and a full member on 27 April 1919. From 1919, he also worked at the Faculty of Social Sciences of Moscow State University, where he was dean. In 1921, he worked at the Department of History at the Yakov Sverdlov Communist University, then at the Academy of the General Staff of the Red Army, the Institute of Red Professors, and a research associate at the Institute of Russian History Association of Research Institutes of Social Sciences. Albert Manfred would later write:

Vyacheslav Volgin, Nikolai Lukin–Antonov, Fedor Rothstein, David Ryazanov – this is the whole list of Marxist historians who worked in the field of foreign history, prominent scientists who stood at the origins of Soviet historiography.

In 1922, Lukin's book "The Paris Commune of 1871" laid the foundation for a new direction in his scientific research. In it, Lukin noted that the Paris Commune was the first attempt of the proletariat to give the bourgeoisie a general battle, and that is what remained in the memory of subsequent generations.

In 1921, he was a member of the "Rothstein Commission". Since 1927, he was a member of the main editorial board of the Great Soviet Encyclopedia, and together with Fedor Rothstein, editor of the department of modern and recent history of Western countries. In 1928, he was on a two-month scientific trip to France. In 1929, he was involved in the Academic Affairs. Since 1931, he headed the Department of Modern History at first at the Moscow Institute of Philosophy, Literature, and History, and since 1934, with the restoration of the History Department at Moscow State University, he headed the Department of Modern History there.

In 1932–36, Lukin was the director of the Institute of History of the Communist Academy. From then, until February 1937, he was director of the Institute of History of the Academy of Sciences of the Soviet Union. At that point, the Presidium of the Academy of Sciences of the Soviet Union dismissed Lukin from the post of director of the Institute of History, leaving him as a full member of the Institute, while also appointing him head of the sector of modern history there.

In 1933, he headed the delegation of Soviet historians at the 7th International Congress of Historians in Warsaw. From 1933 until 1938, he was the editor-in-chief of the journal "Marxist Historian". From 1926, he had been a member of its first editorial board.

In May 1937, Lukin declared: "We, comrades, are undoubtedly facing the danger of a new world war, a war that will be a decisive clash of two systems – socialist and capitalist".

On 22 August 1938, Lukin was arrested. On 26 May 1939, he was sentenced by the Military Collegium of the Supreme Court of the Soviet Union, which stated that Nikolai Lukin was "found guilty of committing crimes under Articles 17-58-8 and 58-11 of the Criminal Code Code of the Russian Soviet Federative Socialist Republic, and sentenced to imprisonment in forced labor camps for a term of 10 years with a defeat in political rights for five years and confiscation of all personally owned property. The verdict is final and not subject to appeal". At the trial, Nikolai Lukin said: "I ask the court to consider that, due to my painful condition, I could not tolerate physical influences, as a result of which I slandered myself and slandered others". He died in custody. Nikolai Lukin was buried at the Vagankovo Cemetery.

On 16 March 1957, the Military Collegium of the Supreme Court of the Soviet Union adopted a ruling according to which the sentence against Nikolai Lukin of 29 May 1939, was quashed "for lack of corpus delicti".

== Selected works ==
- "Maximilian Robespierre" (1919; 2nd Edition – 1924);
- "Paris Commune of 1871" (1922; 2nd Edition – 1924; 3rd – 1926; 4th – 1932);
- "From the History of Revolutionary Armies. Lectures" (1923);
- "The Recent History of Western Europe" (1923; 2nd Edition – 1925);
- "Essays on the Recent History of Germany. 1890–1914" (1925);
- "The Problem of Studying the Era of Imperialism" (1930);
- Selected Works. Volume 1–3. Moscow, 1960–1963.

== Sources ==
- Europe in Modern and Contemporary Times. Collection of Articles in Memory of Academician Nikolai Lukin. Moscow, 1966
- Prokhorov, Alexander (editor–in–chief) (1969–1978). "Lukin Nikolai Mikhailovich". Great Soviet Encyclopedia: in 30 Volumes. (3rd ed). Moscow: Soviet Encyclopedia
- Chudinov, Alexander (2006). "Историк воюющий: Н.М. Лукин [Warring Historian: Nikolai Lukin]". Историк и власть: советские историки сталинской эпохи [Historian and Power: Soviet Historians of the Stalin Era] (in Russian). Saratov: Nauka. pp. 199–250.
- Chudinov, Alexander (2007). "Nikolai Lukin: At the Origins of Soviet Historiography" in Alexander Chudinov (ed). French Revolution: History and Myths. Moscow: Nauka
- Dunaevsky, Vladimir; Tsfasman, Arkady (1985). "Academician Nikolai Mikhailovich Lukin: (Historian. 1885–1940. On the Occasion of the 100th Birthday)". Bulletin of the Academy of Sciences of the Soviet Union. No. 7. pp. 96–103.
- Dunaevsky, Vladimir; Tsfasman, Arkady (1987). "Nikolai Lukin". Scientific Biographies and Memoirs of Scientists. Moscow: Nauka.
- Dunaevsky, Vladimir (1990). "'Case' of Academician Nikolai Mikhailovich Lukin". Novaya I Noveishaya Istoriya (Scientific Historical Journal) (6) (New and Recent History ed.). Moscow: Nauka. ISSN 0130-3864.
- Dunaevsky, Vladimir (2000). "Nikolai Mikhailovich Lukin". In Grigory Sevostyanov (ed.). Portraits of Historians: Time and Fate (PDF). Russian Propylaea. Vol. 2. Moscow: University Book. ISBN 5-7914-0034-9.
- Galkin, Ilya (1984). Nikolai Lukin – Revolutionary and Scientist. Moscow: Moscow State University Publishing House.

Preceded by Vyacheslav Volgin	Dean of the Faculty of Social Sciences, Moscow State University; 1921–1923	Succeeded by Victor Seryozhnikov
Preceded by Mikhail Pokrovsky	Editor-in-chief of the magazine "Marxist Historian"; 1933–1938	Succeeded by Emelyan Yaroslavsky
Preceded by No	Director of the Institute of History, Academy of Sciences of the Soviet Union; 1936–1937	Succeeded by Boris Grekov
Preceded by No	Responsible Editor of the collection "Historical Notes"; 1937–1938	Succeeded by Boris Grekov
