= Sergei Bakhrushin =

Russian historian (1882–1950)

- Сергей Бахрушин
- Born: Sergei Vladimirovich Bakhrushin; 8 October 1882; Moscow, Russian Empire
- Died: 8 March 1950 (aged 67); Moscow, Russian Soviet Federative Socialist Republic, Soviet Union
- Political party: Constitutional Democratic Party
- Occupations: Historian; medievalist; university professor

Academic background
- Education: Imperial Moscow University

Academic work
- Institutions: Moscow State University; Soviet Academy of Sciences; Institute of Red Professors

Sergei Vladimirovich Bakhrushin (Russian: Сергей Владимирович Бахрушин; 8 October 1882 – 8 March 1950) was Russian Soviet historian, medievalist and university professor.

== Biography ==
Bakhrushin was a prominent Moscow family of entrepreneurs. He completed his secondary education at the Tsarevich-Nicholas Lyceum. A disciple of Vasily Klyuchevsky and Matvey Lyubavsky, he graduated in 1904 from the Imperial Moscow University. From 1909 he pursued a doctorate, then taught from 1927 until the end of his life as a professor at Moscow State University. As an activist Bakhrushin was a member of the Constitutional Democratic Party and was especially concerned with combating homelessness.

From 1924 Bakhrushin was a full member at the Institute of History of the Soviet Academy of Sciences. In 1930 Bakhrushin was arrested and exiled during the "Academic Affair" for being involved in an alleged monarchist conspiracy. He was amnestied in 1933 and was appointed a professor at the Institute of Red Professors.

From 1936 he continued his work at the Institute of History of the Soviet Academy of Sciences and from 1942 he was the head of the sector of history of the Soviet Union until the 19th century.

== Works ==
Bakhrushin's research areas were extremely broad: from Kievan Rus to the 19th century. Bakhrushin worked on the popularization of history, particularly through the supervision of school textbooks.

He was the editor and co-author of the collective work History of Moscow, Essays on the History of the USSR, participated in writing a History of Diplomacy and textbooks on the history of the USSR for secondary education.
