= Alexei Byalynitsky-Birulya =

Russian zoologist (1864–1937)

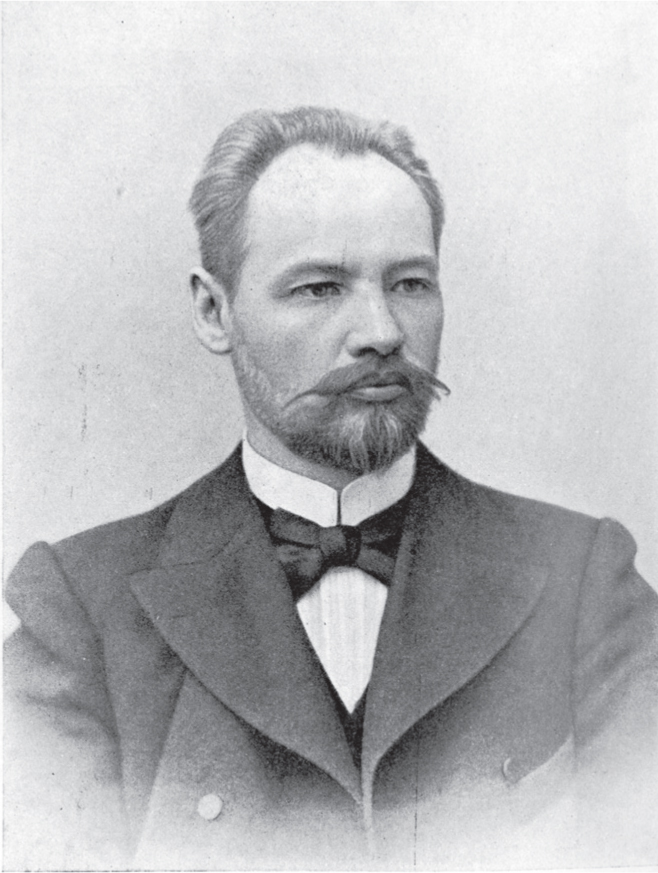

Alexei Andreevich Byalynitsky-Birulya (24 October 1864 – 18 June 1937) was a Belarusian, Russian, and Soviet zoologist who studied the Arctic fauna and was a professor of zoogeography at the St. Petersburg University. He was also an artist who documented the landscapes on his travels. He was a victim of the Academic Trial which led to his being dismissed from his position as director of the zoological museum after which he was sent to a Siberian gulag to serve three years of hard labor.

== Life and work ==
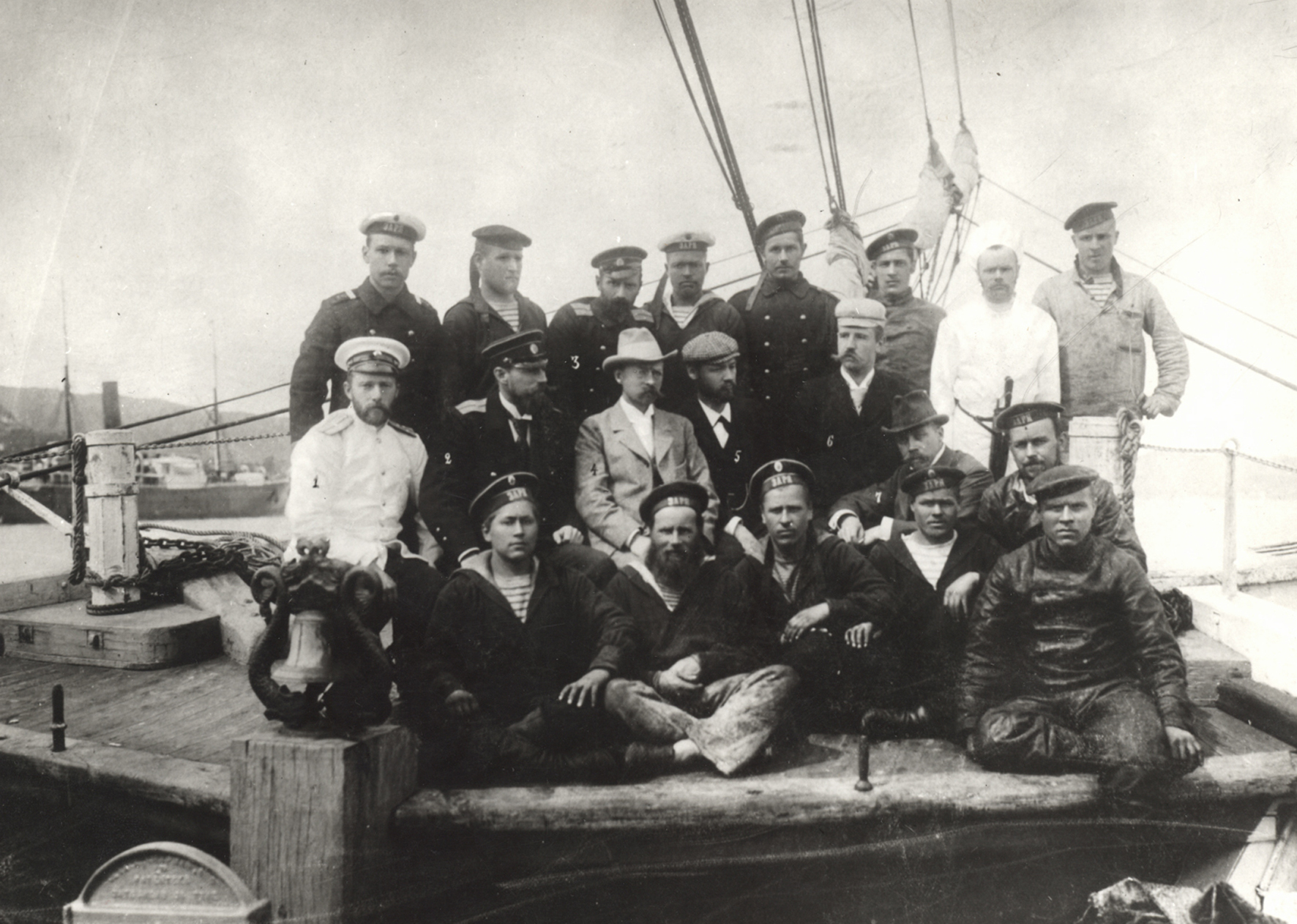
Expedition members aboard the Zarya. Top row, third from left: Alexander Kolchak. Second row: Kolomeitsev, Matisen, Toll, Walter, Seeberg and Byalynitsky-Birulya.

Byalynitsky-Birulya was born on Babkovo Estate, Orsha district, Mogilev Province, the son of naturalist Andrei Simplicianovich and Sofia Franzewna née Lisovskaya. Andrei had established a meteorological station at Korolevo, near Vitebsk, in 1864 and ran it until 1941, publishing records in the Vitebsk Gazette. Alexei graduated from the gymnasium in Vyazma in 1886, and went to St. Petersburg University where he graduated in the natural sciences in 1891. He initially took an interest in botany but shifted to zoology. He studied the marine fauna under Vladimir Shimkevich at the Solovetsky Island biological station. In 1891, he collected insects in Transcaucasia on behalf of the Imperial Russian Entomological Society. From 1893, he worked as a curator at the zoological museum and in 1925 he became a professor of zoogeography. In 1899, he joined the expedition to Svalbard as a naturalist and in 1900 he served as zoologist aboard the polar expedition under Baron Eduard von Toll. The hydrographer A. V. Kolchak was also a part of the expedition. In 1902, the team aboard the Zarya stopped on Kotelny in the Novosibirsk Islands and two teams went out. Byalynitksy-Birulya and three Yakuts went to Novaya Zemlya. Toll went in search of Sannikov Land and was never found again. The sea froze and the group did not manage to move to the mainland for a month. A rescue mission was sent in 1903.

Byalynitsky-Birulya published extensively on the systematics of invertebrates collected from the polar region. He also studied Ross's gull and the distributions of mammals. In 1919, he participated in the development of laws to regulate hunting. From 1917, he edited the annual reports of the zoological museum that he directed from 1929. In 1921, he received the Konstantinov Medal of the Russian Geographical Society. In 1928, he took part in an expedition into central Asia with a special focus on malaria studies and parasitology. He was dismissed from his position in 1929 by the committee of Figatner. In November 1930, he was arrested as part of an academic purge and sentenced by the Troika of OGPU representatives on February 10, 1931. He was sent to labour camp in Belbaltlag for three years. His sentence was shortened but he was exiled to Archangelsk where he worked with the state oceanographic institute. He was dismissed from this post in 1935. He is said to have died in Leningrad with some sources suggesting that he was executed.

Byalynitsky-Birulya was a member of the St. Petersburg Society of Naturalists from 1892, the Russian Entomological Society from 1895 and the Imperial Russian Geographical Society from 1906.
