= State Archive of the Russian Federation =

Russian state archive

Coordinates: 55°43′58″N 37°34′27″E

State Archive of the Russian Federation (GARF)

Agency overview
- Formed: 1992
- Preceding agency: Central State Archive of the October Revolution Central State Archive of RSFSR
- Jurisdiction: Government of Russia
- Headquarters: Moscow, Russia
- Agency executives: Larisa Aleksandrovna Rogovaya, Director; Sergei Vladimirovich Mironenko, Scientific supervisor
- Parent agency: Presidential Administration of Russia (Federal Archival Agency)
- Website: statearchive.ru

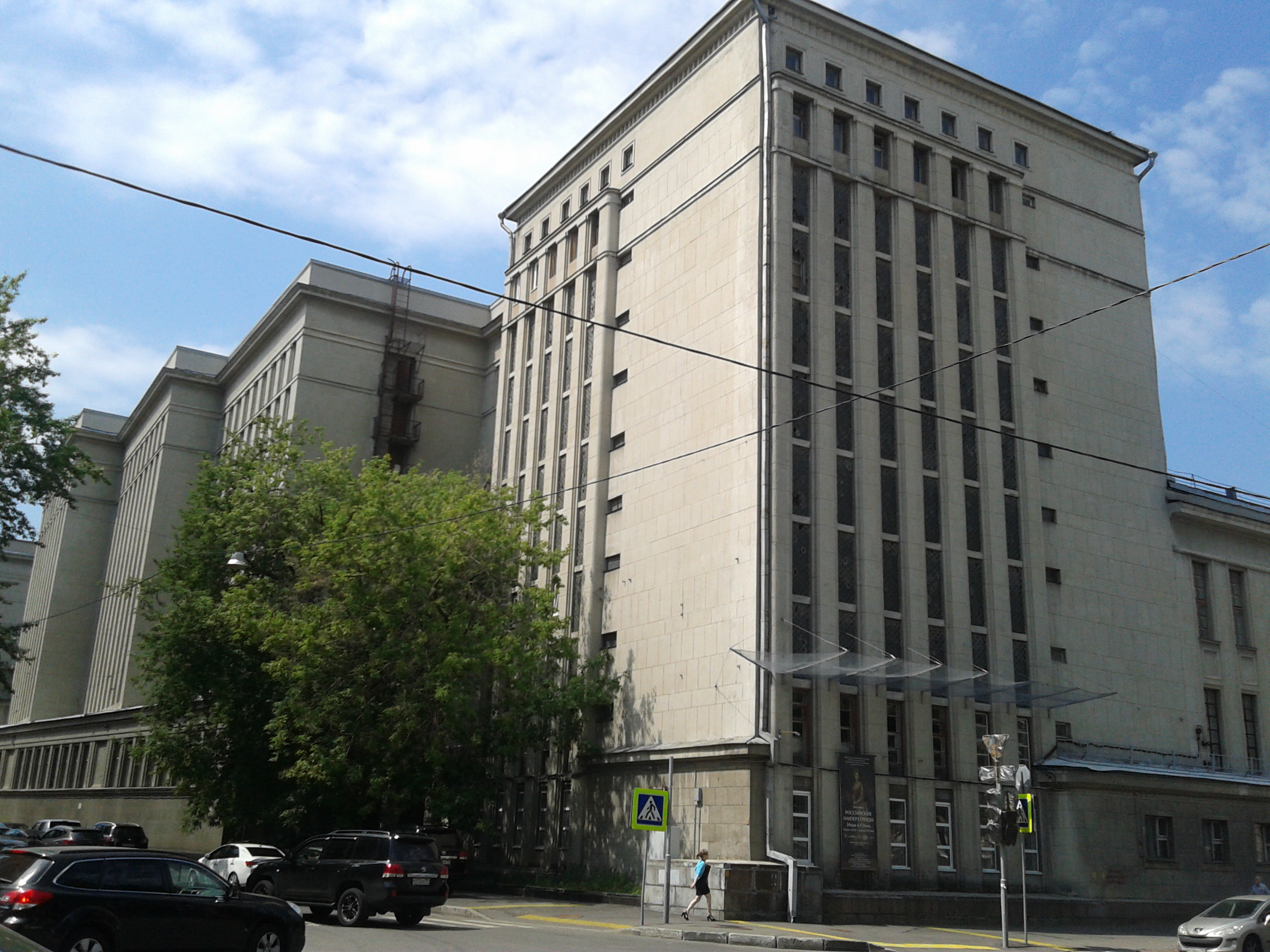
Main building of the GARF (Bol'shaya Pirogovskaya ul., 17)

The State Archive of the Russian Federation (GARF) (Russian: Государственный архив Российской Федерации (ГАРФ)) is a large Russian state archive managed by Rosarkhiv (the Federal Archival Agency of Russia). It houses documents from the highest bodies of Russian authority, including:

- some official documents relating to the history of the Russian Empire (mostly concerning the activity of police)
- personal records (including archives of some members of the imperial Romanov from the early 19th century to 1918)
- official documents of the supreme national legislative and executive institutions of the Russian Provisional Government (1917)
- records of Soviet Russia as an independent state (1917-1922) and as a territorial entity of the USSR (1923-1991)
- archives of the Soviet Union (1922-1991)
- records of the Russian Federation (since 1992)
- documents from many other sources

The State Archive, established in Moscow in 1992, acquired the collections of:

- the Central State Archive of the October Revolution (Russian: Центральный государственный архив Октябрьской революции, высших органов государственной власти и органов государственного управления (ЦГАОР СССР)) (founded in 1920)
- the Central State Archive of the Russian SFSR (Russian: Центральный государственный архив РСФСР (ЦГА РСФСР)) (founded in 1957).
