= Andrey Shestakov =

Soviet historian

- Андрей Шестаков
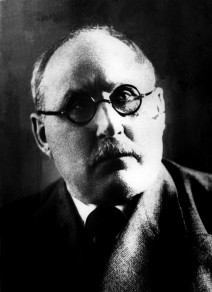
- Born: November 5 [O.S. October 24], 1877; Arkhangelsk Uyezd, Arkhangelsk Governorate, Russian Empire
- Died: June 29, 1941 (aged 63); Moscow, Soviet Union
- Education: Institute of Red Professors
- Scientific career
- Workplaces: Voronezh State University; Communist Academy

Andrey Vasilievich Shestakov (Russian: Андрей Васильевич Шестаков; November 5 [O.S. October 24], 1877 – June 29, 1941) was a Soviet historian, a specialist in the agrarian history of Russia. Professor (1935), Doctor of Historical Sciences (1937), Corresponding Member of the Academy of Sciences of the Soviet Union (January 28, 1939, history).

== Biography ==
He graduated from the 5th grade school (1889) in Arkhangelsk, then became a factory worker.

In 1897 he joined one of the working circles. He studied in the years 1897–1888 on the Prechistensky workers' courses in Moscow, where in 1898 he was arrested without completing the course.

From 1898 he was active in the revolutionary movement. In 1903 he joined the Russian Social Democratic Labour Party, and became a member of Bolshevik faction.

One of the founders of the first social democratic organization in the Donbass and the Bolsheviks' Moscow district organization. He was a leader of the Odessa strike (1903); the participant of the Congress of the Peasant Union (1905) and the congress of the Bolshevik party organizations working in the village (Kazan, 1905).

In December 1905, one of the leaders of the armed uprising on the Moscow-Kazan railroad (party alias Nicodemus), a member of the Moscow Committee of the Russian Social Democratic Labour Party.

From 1906 to 1913 he worked mainly in trade unions. In 1913–14 he emigrated abroad.

From 1918 to 1921 at the party and Soviet work in Moscow, Voronezh, Ryazan (1921).

In 1922 he worked in the Main Political and Educational Committee of the People's Commissariat of Education of the Russian Soviet Federative Socialist Republic, and from the same year he taught at the Moscow Provincial Party School.

After graduating from the Institute of Red Professors in 1924, where he entered in 1921, he became Head of the Department of History of the Soviet Union at the Communist University of the Toilers of the East (1924), Faculty of Ethnology of the 1st Moscow State University (1924–1928), 2nd Moscow State University (1924–1939, from 1930 – at the Moscow State Pedagogical University), department of the Voronezh State University (1928–1929). He also taught at the Institute of Nationalities of the USSR, Institute of Red Professors, Military Political Academy.

Shestakov became the first editor of the first Soviet historical journal, Marxist Historian, from 1926 to 1930. He was one of the organizers and leaders of the Society of Marxist Historians.

In 1930 he was elected a full member of the Communist Academy under the Central Executive Committee of the Soviet Union.

From 1930 to 1935 he was deputy director for science, acting director of the Museum of the Revolution of the Soviet Union.

In 1935, the Committee on Scientists and Educational Institutions was approved by a full member of the Institute of Nationalities and was awarded the title of professor.

In 1937, the All-Union Committee for Higher Education awarded him the degree of Doctor of Historical Sciences.

In 1939 he was the head of the 19th–20th centuries Soviet Union history sector, in 1939–1941 he was a senior researcher at the Institute of History of the Academy of Sciences of the Soviet Union.

His main works are devoted mainly to the agrarian history of Russia of the 1861–1917 period. He also led the team of authors of the textbook "A Short Course in the History of the Soviet Union" for the 3-4th grades of the secondary school (1937). It is noted that he is best known as the author of this textbook.
