= Marxist Historian =

Soviet scientific journal

- Editor: Andrey Shestakov (1926–1930); Mikhail Pokrovsky (1930–1932); Nikolai Lukin (1933–1938); Emelyan Yaroslavsky (1938–1941)
- Categories: Science Magazine
- Publisher: Communist Academy; Institute of History of the Academy of Sciences of the Soviet Union
- First issue: 1926
- Final issue: 1941
- Country: Soviet Union
- Based in: Moscow
- Language: Russian

The Marxist Historian (Russian: Историк-марксист) was a Soviet scientific journal published in Moscow in 1926–1941. Merged with the "Historical Journal". The first historical magazine, widely covering issues of national and world history, including the countries of the East. The journal published research articles, reviews, documents and official materials.

== History ==
The appearance of the first issue of the magazine was noted in the newspaper Pravda (June 15 and July 7, 1926) and the magazine Bolshevik (No. 23–24, 1926).

Ideological support for the magazine came from the Press Department of the Central Committee of the All–Union Communist Party (Bolsheviks) and from the Agitation and Propaganda Department. The first provided the journal with constant assistance in the form of reports on the activities and approval of the composition of the editorial board. In turn, the board fulfilled the instructions of the leadership by reviewing the published historical literature (which included textbooks and teaching aids), and also compiled reviews and summaries of the current state of affairs in historical science. The press department asked historians to prepare memoranda for drawing up a plan for the development of the historical press in the Soviet Union, which should have included the content of historical journals and the essence of published articles, the authorship, as well as the order of work of the editorial board, circulation and volume.

At this time, the journal published reports on the activities of the Society of Marxist Historians, information about past meetings of the Council of the Society of Marxist Historians, the past work of sections, the Presidium of the Communist Academy, the results of scientific research, verbatim reports of scientific meetings, as well as individual reports and articles. The reports were devoted to issues of historical and revolutionary events (October Revolution, Revolution of 1905–1907, French Revolution, financial capitalism in Russia), historical and political figures (Nikolay Chernyshevsky), social and political movements (Thermidorian Coup, Trotskyists, opportunists). The magazine took a significant part in the preparation and conduct of the 1st All–Union Conference of Marxist Historians.

In 1926–1931, the journal was a print publication of the Society of Marxist Historians at the Communist Academy and its Institute of History of the Communist Academy. The Institute studied the history of the working class in the Soviet Union, the history of the peoples of the Soviet Union, as well as a broad development of the history of Western countries, which included the history of the Second International, the history of imperialism and the revolutionary movement. In the period from 1929 to 1935, about 65–70% of all materials were published by employees of the Institute of History of the Communist Academy.

In 1936–1941 – published by the Institute of History of the Academy of Sciences of the Soviet Union. The journal created the column "On the Front of Historical Science", which published the decisions of the All–Union Communist Party (Bolsheviks) and the Council of People's Commissars of the Soviet Union on historical education, as well as reports on meetings of employees of research institutes and teachers of universities in the country, where these decisions discussed. After the transition of the journal to the jurisdiction of the Institute of History of the Academy of Sciences of the Soviet Union, due to internal changes in the latter, difficulties arose in interaction between the editorial board and the directorate. In 1938, the executive secretary of the magazine, Boris Rubtsov, wrote that "only a very narrow group of authors was interested in the work of the Marxist Historian". (Note: Marxist Historian – 1938 – No. 3 – Page 150) Another executive secretary of the journal, in her report in February 1938, noted that there was an insufficient participation of the staff of the Institute of History in the work of the journal, and according to the estimates of the editorial board, only 35.7% of the authors of the articles were employees of the Institute of History. (Note: Marxist Historian – 1938 – No. 3 – Page 149) Nevertheless, in 1940, at a session of the Department of History and Philosophy of the Academy of Sciences of the Soviet Union, in the report for 1939, it was noted that the journal took one of the first places in production. (Note: Marxist Historian – 1940 – No. 4–5 – Page 150)

During these years, with the participation of the journal, discussions were held at the Institute of History of the Academy of Sciences of the Soviet Union on the periodization of world history, on the essence of the social system of Kievan Rus, on the emergence of the Russian State, and the problem of the folding of the Belarusian and Ukrainian nationalities was also considered. (Note: Archive of the Academy of Sciences of the Soviet Union, Fund 457, Inventory 1 (1941), File 9, Sheet 9) A discussion was held on the issue of absolutism and autocracy, and there were also proposals to discuss the problem of disputes about Slavophilism. Along with the preparation of textbooks and multivolume editions, monographs were written on a wide range of topics: the history of the October Revolution, revolutionary movements in Russia in the 19th century, the French Revolution, Western European revolutions in the 19th century. The magazine first published chapters and sections from the prepared monographs of historians – Osip Pyatnitsky on the October Uprising in 1917 in Moscow, Alexander Molok on the July Revolution of 1830 and Evgeny Tarle on the Prairial Uprising of 1795. The works of Yevgeny Kosminsky about the English Village of the 13th century, Fyodor Potemkin about the Lyons Uprisings and Boris Grekov about Kievan Rus were reviewed. The magazine constantly published reviews of the "Materials on the History of the Peoples of the Soviet Union" published by the Institute of History of the Academy of Sciences of the Soviet Union and individual historical sources. And the staff of the Institute published reviews of the main stream of historical publications in the Soviet Union in the journal. Thus, at the suggestion of the staff of the sector of the history of the Middle Ages, the magazine published reviews of "Chronological Extracts" by Karl Marx.

== Contents of the journal ==
The main departments in the journal were:

- Articles;
- Reports;
- Materials;
- History teaching;
- Criticism and bibliography;
- Chronicle.

For 15 years of the journal's existence, the main place belonged to research articles, which occupied from one third to half of the total page. Here the most frequent topics were: the history of the three Russian revolutions, the revolutionary movement in Russia in the 19th century, the history of the peoples of the Soviet Union, and in the 1930s – the socio–economic history of Russia and the history of the All–Union Communist Party (Bolsheviks). The main topics of world history in the magazine were: the history of the French Revolution, Western European revolutions in the 19th century, the Paris Commune, the international workers', socialist and communist movement, the national liberation war of the colonies and dependent countries. Ancient and medieval history was developed mainly by representatives of the old historical school and did not fit into the new conditions. The main place was occupied by articles on modern history. This was due to the fact that there were still few specialists in contemporary history. Nevertheless, the authors turned to the recent history of England, France and Germany. The first articles on Soviet American studies were written, which examined the rise of the revolutionary movement and the national liberation struggle in Latin American countries. Since the mid–1930s, the first studies on the history of the Middle Ages, the Ancient World began to appear, issues of ethnography, archaeology, auxiliary historical disciplines were covered. At the same time, the magazine began to publish articles on the history of feudalism. Oriental studies in the journal were poorly developed, since there was no strong enough team of authors and there was strong competition from other journals – "New East", "Problems of China", "Pacific Ocean" and "World Economy and World Politics". Despite this, the journal published works devoted to the national liberation struggle of the peoples of the East in modern and modern times, and from the mid–1930s, articles on the ancient history of the East and the Middle Ages began to appear.

In the "Reports" section, the reports read at the meetings of the Society of Marxist Historians and the Communist Academy were published. The topics echoed with the articles. At times, the magazine printed transcripts, especially those where methodological issues were discussed. Since the early 1930s, only revised reports have been printed instead of transcripts.

The "History Teaching" department published reports by members of the methodological section of the Society of Marxist Historians, as well as reviews of textbooks and methodological literature. There was also a place for discussions about the methods and ways of teaching history in higher educational institutions and schools. Since the second half of the 1930s, the magazine began to widely publish the decisions of the All–Union Communist Party (Bolsheviks) and the Council of People's Commissars of the Soviet Union on history education, methodological articles were published on teaching history in higher educational institutions, information on the work of the first faculties of history, as well as about work on textbooks.

The Critique and Bibliography section covered approximately 17–20%. In this section, more than 70% of publications are reviews of monographs and articles, mainly by domestic authors. In the first years of the journal's existence, the greatest attention of reviewers received the works devoted to the history of the development of capitalism and the history of Soviet society, the history of the revolutionary movement in Russia in the 19th century and socio–economic relations, the history of the October Revolution and the All–Union Communist Party (Bolsheviks). In the second half of the 1930s, the works of Soviet scientists on the topic of feudalism, the social system of Kievan Rus, peasant uprisings, and the socio–economic relations of the Russian State were widely reviewed. On world history, reviews were written on the works of Soviet authors on modern history, where the topics were: the history of Western European revolutions in the 19th century, the history of social thought, the activities of Karl Marx and Friedrich Engels, the workers' and socialist movement, the Paris Commune. Among the works of foreign authors, publications on the history of Western European revolutions of the 19th century, international relations, issues of methodology and historiography were reviewed. A similar review was used for polemics with opponents of Marxism–Leninism. In the 1930s, publications of the Third Reich were criticized. Along with this, the works of "progressive authors" who wrote on the topic of international relations and the place of the Soviet Union in ensuring peace and security were reviewed. The memoirist was investigated, both the editions of the "White emigre memoir literature" that were subjected to condemning criticism, and the memoirs of the participants in the three revolutions in Russia and populism. The reviewers also dealt with the analysis of publication techniques: "the presence of pointers, notes, prefaces, analysis of sources, the time of its occurrence, and more". Another important place was occupied by the development of exact requirements for the publication of documentary materials: "the required minimum of documents on each issue, the general methodological and methodological setting in their selection". Here, special attention was paid to the novelty and reliability of the source. The next important step of the reviewer should have been the archaeographic processing of the source, where the necessary components were to be "compliance with the original, preservation of spelling, accurate translation from a foreign language". First of all, the journal reviewed the works of employees of the Institute of History of the Communist Academy, the Academy of Sciences of the Soviet Union, the Central Archive, the Commission on the History of the October Revolution and the Russian Communist Party (Bolsheviks), the Marx–Engels–Lenin Institute Under the Central Committee of the All–Union Communist Party (Bolsheviks). Of the publishers, the most reviewed were the publications of the State Publishing House of the Russian Soviet Federative Socialist Republic and the Publishing House of Party Literature.

The remaining 3–5% were at the disposal of the chronicle.

== Editions ==
In 1926–1931, 22 issues were issued, in 1932–1934 and 1936–1939, the frequency of publication was 6 issues per year, in 1935 and 1940 – 12 issues. Over the entire period of the magazine's existence, 94 issues have been published.

== Responsible editors ==
- Andrey Shestakov (1926–1930);
- Mikhail Pokrovsky (1930–1932);
- Nikolai Lukin (1933–1938);
- Emelyan Yaroslavsky (1938–1941).

== Journal estimates ==
According to the assessment of the Great Soviet Encyclopedia, the journal played an important role "in the struggle against bourgeois historiography and the approval of the Marxist concept in Soviet historical science".

The historian Anatoly Sakharov, in his article "The Journal "Voprosy Istorii" Is 50 Years Old" (1976, No. 6), called the magazine a propagandist and herald of the revolutionary science of the past, also a military weapon and the concentration of its rapidly gaining experience, as well as its tribune and chair in one person.

Historian Alevtina Alatortseva notes that...

The content of the first issues of the journal, its authorship ensured the success of the entire publication. Rigorous thematic selection, original character of research, their high scientific level, relevance were put into the principles of work of the editorial board of the journal. Contemporaries noted the popularity of the new edition among researchers, teachers, methodologists and historians. <…> The journal "Marxist Historian" reflected on its pages the main directions of research, scientific–methodological, propaganda work of the Society. The study of the leading problems of Soviet historiography went on in the journal in terms of historiographic and methodological, in a constant struggle against bourgeois and petty–bourgeois, Trotskyist–Menshevik concepts for the approval of the Marxist–Leninist understanding of the most important events of the world historical process.

== Sources ==
- Alevtina Alatortseva (1969). On the History of the Creation of the Journal "Marxist Historian" (Soviet Archives ed.).
- Alevtina Alatortseva (1973). The Journal "Marxist Historian" Was the Organ of the Society of Marxist Historians and the Institute of History of the Communist Academy (History and Historians. Historiographic Yearbook. 1971 ed.). Moscow.
- Alevtina Alatortseva (1979). Vladimir Naumov (ed.). The Journal "Marxist Historian" (1926–1941). Moscow: Science.
- Prokhorov, Alexander (1972). "Marxist Historian". Great Soviet Encyclopedia. 10. Moscow.
