= Russian rescue expedition of 1903 =

Russian Arctic expedition

- Routes of expeditions by Toll (1901, red and purple) and Kolchak (1903, green)
- Date: 5 May 1903 – 7 December 1903
- Location: Russian Empire
- Participants: 17 people, including Alexander Kolchak and Nikifor Begichev
- Deaths: None

The Russian rescue expedition of 1903 was commissioned by the Saint Petersburg Academy of Sciences to rescue the groups of Baron Eduard von Toll and Alexei Byalynitsky-Birulya that were left near the New Siberian Islands by the Russian polar expedition of 1900–1902. The expedition was organized and led by Alexander Kolchak, then a young researcher and lieutenant of the Russian Navy, and later a ruler of Russia.

== Background ==
In December 1902, the main part of the Russian polar expedition of 1900–1902 arrived in Saint Petersburg and reported their results to the Academy of Sciences. The academy was worried about the fate of Baron Toll, who split from the expedition with three assistants to explore Bennett Island and sent no correspondence since then, and Alexei Byalynitsky-Birulya who was left on New Siberia.

On 9 December 1902, three key members of the expedition, Alexander Kolchak, Fyodor Matisen and Konstantin Vollosovich, were invited to the Academy Meeting devoted to the organization of a rescue expedition. Matisen opposed the expedition believing it will not fulfill its goals. The idea of sending icebreaker Yermak was rejected because its draft was too large for the shallow waters of the area. Kolchak proposed to reach Bennett Island on boats and then use dogsleds. His plan was deemed equally dangerous to the decision of Toll to split from the previous expedition; yet it was approved by the Academician Feodosy Chernyshev, with Kolchak being appointed as the expedition head.

Already by 16 January 1903, Kolchak had received first payment for the expedition. Because of this assignment, he had to postpone his planned wedding to Sofia Omirova.

== Preparations ==
To recruit men for his dangerous expedition, Kolchak went to Mezen and then to the White Sea coasts, where he hired six pomors. In Arkhangelsk, he received the news that one group to be rescued (Byalynitsky-Birulya) managed to reach the mainland from New Siberia; however, the fate of Toll was still unknown.

Kolchak was joined by two members of the previous expedition, boatswain Nikifor Begichev and helmsman Vasily Zheleznyakov. Begichev criticized the plan of Kolchak to bring rescue boats from Mezen and convinced him to use the whaleboat left on Zarya, the ship of the previous expedition that was abandoned at Tiksi Bay.

While returning from the 1900–1902 expedition, Kolchak met P. V. Olenin, a specialist on Yakutia and Siberia who become his friend. Kolchak contacted him by telegraph, asking for help. Accordingly, Olenin traveled to Verkhoyansk and then Ustyansk to buy dogs, dog food and various equipment for the expedition.

On 9 February Kolchak arrived in Irkutsk, and on 8 March all 17 expedition members gathered in Yakutsk. From there they went down the river Aldan and its tributary Nera and reached Verhojansk. After crossing the Kular Ridge, on 10 April they arrived in the village Kazachy on the Yana River. There he was notified about a problem with the planned procuring of whaleboat from Zarya, and rushed to the Tiksi Bay, only to find that the problem was already solved. On Zarya, Kolchak once again met Matisen, who was in charge of selling the ship.

== Expedition ==
In early May, the expedition reached Adzhergaydahe, the northernmost settlement of the continent, and on 5 May began its journey to the New Siberian Islands. The expedition included 17 people and was equipped with 10 sleds, each dragged by 13 dogs. The boat was transported by two sledges and 30 dogs, who were helped by people, yet they refused to pull for longer than six hours. Transportation was carried at night, when the ice was strong enough to support the sleds.

On 23 May the expedition members reached Kotelny Island, where they engaged in hunting and fitting of the boat while waiting for the ice to melt for navigation. By 18 July, the waters were cleared from ice, and the team split in two groups: seven men sailed ahead on the whaleboat and helped the others to find a path through the icefields.

On 26 July the expedition met Sergei Tolstov, a sailor from the 1900–1902 expedition who was left on Faddeyevsky Peninsula to wait for Toll, whose traces were not found anywhere. Further on Cape Vysoky they met Brusnev, who was also left by the previous expedition to assist Toll, and rested at his camp for a day. From Cape Vysoky, the team traveled through open waters, using sail and oars, and on 4 August reached the Bennett Island. There, on Cape Emma, Kolchak found a bottle with a note from Toll and map of the island.

Using the map, Kolchak, Begichev and Inkov went to the other side of the island, where Toll made a camp. While crossing cracks in the ice, Kolchak miscalculated a jump and disappeared under icy water. He was rescued and re-dressed by Begichev and continued the journey.

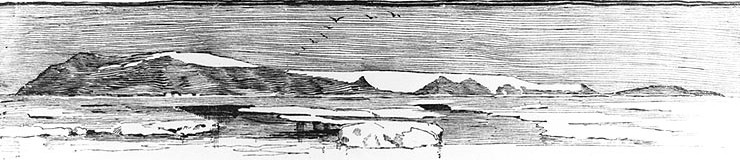
Bennett Island (1881)

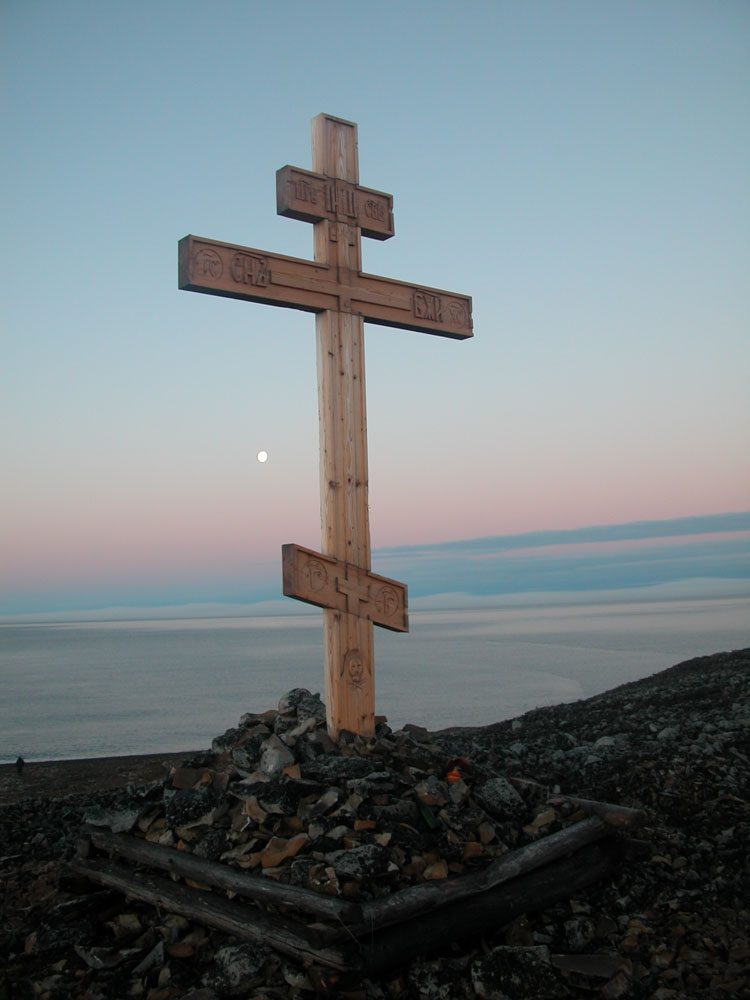
Orthodox cross commemorating the 100th anniversary of the rescue expedition of 1903, raised in August 2003 on Bennett Island

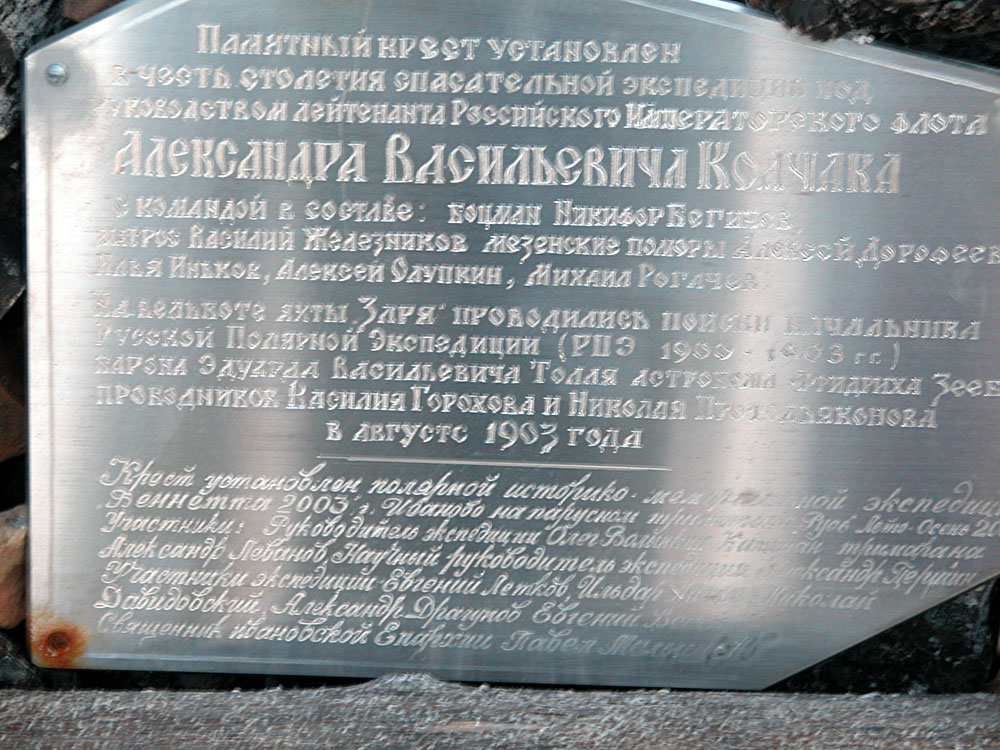
Inscription on the cross

In the camp, Kolchak found samples collected by Toll, some of his geodesic instruments, and a diary, which contained a summary of his exploration of the island. Toll wrote that the island has an area of about 230 square kilometers with an elevation of 457 meters above mean sea level. He described its fauna and geological structure and noted the presence of bones of mammoth and other quaternary animals. The fauna included bears, walruses and a herd of 30 reindeer, with bird flocks flying over from north to south. Toll concluded that they were heading south, were all healthy, and their provisions would suffice for 14–20 days.

Toll's group had built a shelter from driftwood, which could also be used for fuel. For unknown reasons it did not store food and abandoned the remains of killed bears and reindeer.

Toll had arrived at Bennett Island on 21 July 1902 facing a dilemma: set a basecamp and engage in hunting to replenish his food supplies, or rely on the arrival of Zarya and proceed with explorations. Following his penchant for risk-taking, Toll had chosen the latter. When it became clear that Zarya would not come, the group was already low on ammunition, with only 30 shotgun rounds found at the shelter, and the reindeer had already left the island. On 26 October 1902, Toll's group headed south.

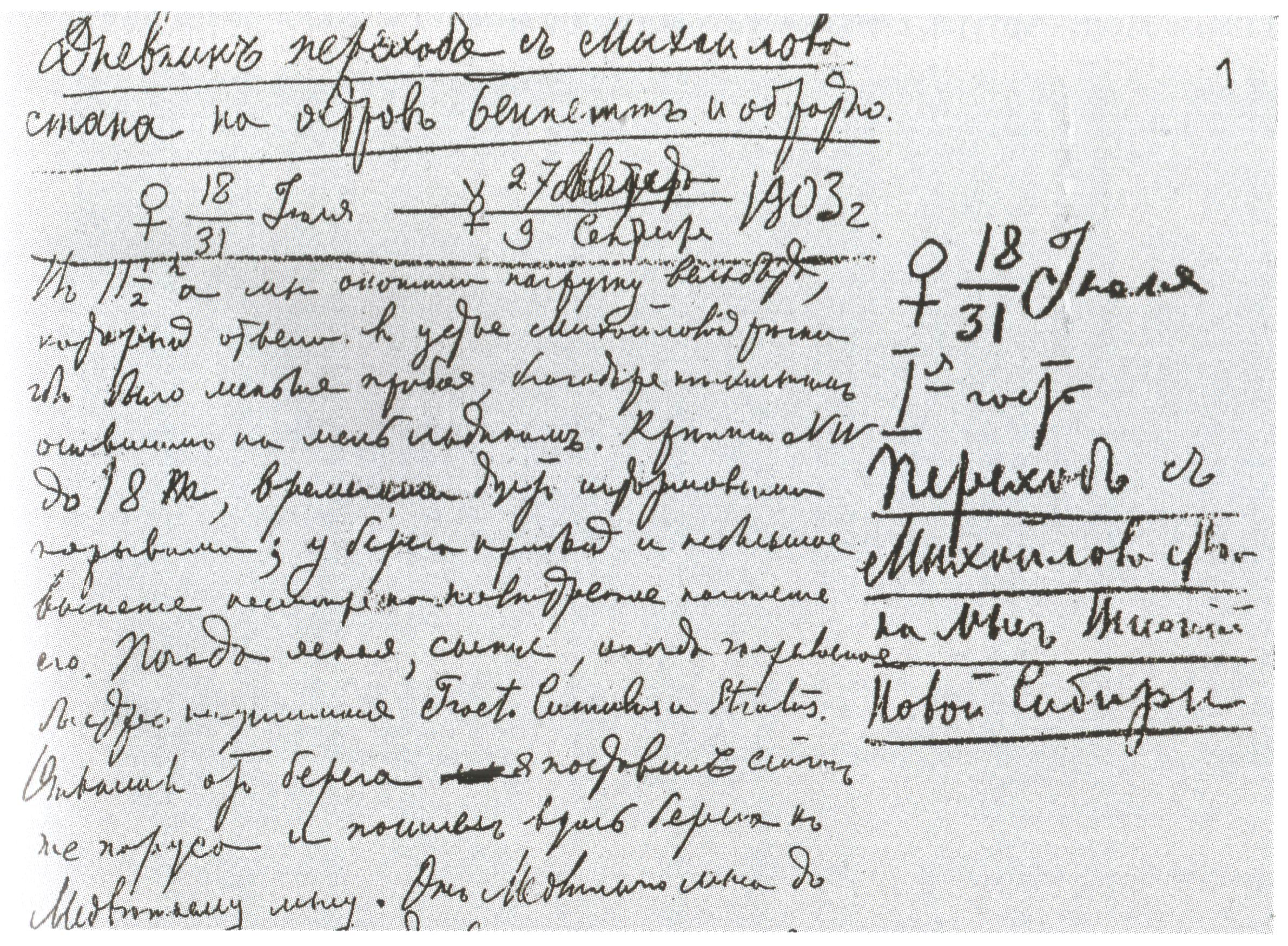
First page of Kolchak's "Diary of travel from Mikhailov camp to Bennett Island and back"

Kolchak spent three days searching for traces of Toll all over the island. The island's north-eastern tip was named after Emmeline Toll, and the south-eastern tip after Academician Chernyshev. Two hills were named as De Long Mountain and Mount Toll, and glaciers on their top were named for Frederick Seeberg, the astronomer and magnetologist who joined Toll in his last voyage. Kolchak wanted to measure the height of the glaciers, but his aneroid was damaged by his fall in icy water.

Kolchak's expedition also surveyed New Siberian Islands, but found no traces of Toll and decided that he vanished while navigating in between them.

With the autumn approaching, Kolchak decided to return to the continent with the first favorable wind. On 7 August the whaleboat departed from Bennett, and by 14 August reached the camp of Brusnev on New Siberia, where Kolchak made a three-day stop. On 27 August, the expedition reached Kotelnikov Island, where it spent two months waiting for the waters to freeze to continue on sleds.

On 7 December Kolchak met his bride in Kazachye village, where the outdoors temperature was −55 °C at the time. Omirova told him that the Academy lost its hopes in a favorable outcome of the expedition, and even wanted it to return, but lost communication with the travelers.

On 26 January Kolchak reached Yakutsk, from where he sent a telegram to the Academy of Sciences. The telegram said that Toll explored the Bennett Island between 21 July and 26 October 1902, and then left it and disappeared without a trace; the information was published by many contemporary newspapers.

== Results ==
Kolchak's expedition completed its task and returned without loss. In addition to providing a plausible evidence to the fate of Toll, it provided valuable data to the geography and ice formation in the region, and was later highly praised by Pyotr Semyonov-Tyan-Shansky. In recognition of his achievements, in 1906 Kolchak was elected a member of the Russian Geographical Society and bestowed with its highest award, the Constantine Medal, "for taking part in the expedition of Baron Toll and for the journey to the island of Bennett". Only three people received this medal before Kolchak: Fridtjof Nansen, Adolf Erik Nordenskiöld and Nicholas Jurgens.

== Bibliography ==
- Kruchinin A. (2010). Адмирал Колчак: жизнь, подвиг, память [Admiral Kolchak: life, feat, legacy]. Moscow: Atrel'. ISBN 978-5-17-063753-9.
- Plotnikov I.F. (1998). Александр Васильевич Колчак. Жизнь и деятельность [Alexander Kolchak – life and work]. Rostov: Feniks. ISBN 5-222-00228-4.
- Zyryanov P.N. (2012). Адмирал Колчак, верховный правитель России [Admiral Kolchak, the supreme ruler of Russia]. Vol. 1356 (4th ed.). Moscow: Molodaya Guardia. ISBN 978-5-235-03375-7.
