= Boris Vipper =

Russian art historian (1888–1967)

Boris Robertovich Vipper
- Борис Робертович Виппер (Russian)
- Born: 15 April [O.S. 3 April] 1888; Moscow, Russian Empire
- Died: 24 January 1967 (aged 78); Moscow, Soviet Union
- Other name: Boriss Vipers
- Occupation: Academic
- Parent: Robert Wipper

Academic background
- Education: Imperial Moscow University

Boris Robertovich Vipper (Russian: Борис Робертович Виппер, Latvian: Boriss Vipers; 15 April 1888 – 24 January 1967) was a Russian, Latvian and Soviet art historian.

== Early life and education ==
Boris Robertovich Vipper was born in Moscow, in the Russian Empire, the only son of historian Robert Wipper, who was of Austrian origin (his ancestors arrived in Russia in the 1820s from Bregenz), and his wife Anastasiia Vasilievna Akhramovich, an ethnic Belarusian. He attended the VII Moscow Classical Gymnasium, completing his studies in 1906, and applied for entrance to the Imperial Moscow University, where his father was employed. Vipper studied at the historical-philological faculty, graduating in 1911. In 1918 he obtained a master's degree at the same institution, defending his thesis on "The problem and development of still life".

== Career ==
In 1914 Vipper started teaching at the Moscow City University, where he worked until 1917, and in parallel taught at the Imperial Moscow University between 1915 and 1924. At this time, with his father's views on history coming under criticism from the new Soviet authorities, the Vippers moved to newly-independent Latvia to continue their academic career. A specialist in European art, Boris Vipper taught history and art theory at the Latvian Academy of Arts, and from 1932 at the University of Latvia, making a substantial contribution to the research on Latvian art. Due to a lack of knowledge of Latvian, he taught in Russian until 1929, when he was forbidden to do so by the authorities. During this period, in addition to his teaching activity, Vipper defended his doctoral dissertation in 1927 at the Kaunas University.

After the annexation of Latvia by the Soviet Union, Vipper was invited back to Moscow in 1941, where he took up a position as senior researcher at the Institute for Material Culture of the Academy of Sciences of the Soviet Union. During World War II he also taught briefly at the Central Asian State University in Tashkent (1942-1943). In 1944 he returned to the capital to teach at the Moscow State University, where he taught general art history until 1955, as well as work at the Pushkin Museum and as a senior researcher at the Institute of Art History of the Academy of Sciences of the Soviet Union, holding both positions until his death.

== Published works ==
His fundamental works are dedicated to the main problems in art history and include questions of realism, struggles between art schools and historical development of styles and genres. His propaedeutic course for art historians, Introduction to the Historical Study of Arts, was unique for its deep and thorough analysis of technical problems and genres. He covered primitive to 20th-century art.

- Latvijas māksla baroka laikmetā, Rīga, 1937
- Baroque art in Latvia, Rīga, 1939
- Проблема и развитие натюрморта, Казань, 1922
- Тинторетто. М., 1948
- Борьба течений в итальянском искусстве XVI века, М., 1956
- Становление реализма в голландской живописи XVII века, М., 1957
- Очерки голландской живописи эпохи расцвета (1640-1670), М., 1962
- Проблемы реализма в итальянской живописи XVII-XVIII вв., М., 1966
- Статьи об искусстве, М., 1970
- Введение в Историческое изучение искусства. М. 1970
