= Yevgeny Tarle =

Soviet historian and academician (1874–1955)

Yevgeny Viktorovich Tarle
- Евгений Викторович Тарле
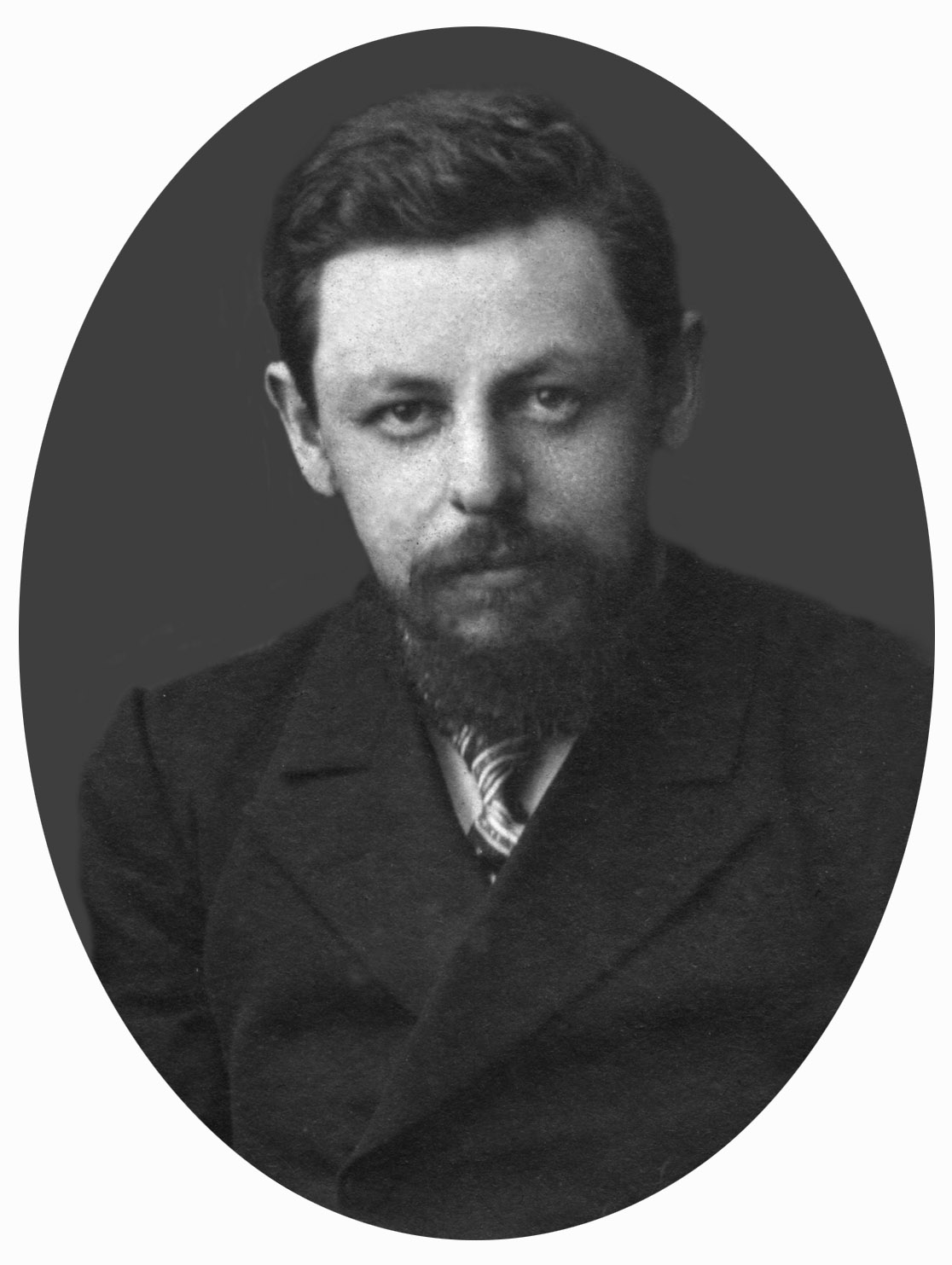
- Tarle in 1903
- Born: Grigory Tarle; 27 October 1874; Kiev, Russian Empire
- Died: 6 January 1955 (aged 80); Moscow, Russian SFSR, Soviet Union
- Burial place: Novodevichy Cemetery, Moscow
- Occupations: Academician; historian
- Awards: Stalin Prize first degree (1942, 1943, 1946)

Yevgeny Viktorovich Tarle (Russian: Евгений Викторович Та́рле; 27 October [O.S. 15 October] 1874 – 6 January 1955) was a Soviet historian, Marxist scholar, and academician of the Russian Academy of Sciences, who studied and published on topics such as the Napoleonic invasion of Russia and the Crimean War. Much of his work dealt with themes of Marxist historiography, imperialism, and Russian nationalism. Tarle spent much of his professional life disagreeing with state authorities over his scholarship and was also a history reader of the Moscow State Institute of International Relations (Russia's diplomatic university).

== Life ==
=== Early life and education ===
Yevgeny Tarle born Grigory Tarle in 1874 in Kiev, Russia (modern-day Ukraine) into a Jewish family. He changed his name as a young man, before converting to the Orthodox Church. His father, Viktor Grigorievich Tarle, belonged to the Merchantry Social Estate and ran a shop in Kiev. Viktor also translated books from Russian to German, including the works of Fyodor Dostoyevsky. Viktor and his wife Rozalia Arnoldovna Tarle had four children.

=== Early political activism ===
As a student, Tarle joined Marxist clubs and took an active part in the social democratic movement, frequently visiting Kievan factory workers as a lecturer and agitator. On 1 May 1900, he was arrested during a secret meeting in the middle of Anatoly Lunacharsky's speech. Tarle was sent to Kherson under police supervision and was banned from teaching at imperial universities and gymnasiums. In August, he and his wife moved to Warsaw, where he published articles on history in various magazines. In 1901, he was allowed a two-day visit to St. Petersburg to defend his master's thesis on Thomas More. With the support of his colleagues, he was permitted to work as a privatdozent at the University of St. Petersburg in 1903, a position he held until 1917.

In February 1905, Tarle was arrested again for participating in student protests and was excluded from the university. However, after the October Manifesto decriminalized Marxists, he returned and continued his teaching career. To achieve his doctoral degree, he completed a two-volume dissertation about France. From 1913 to 1918, he served as a professor at the University of Tartu. During this time, he completed another work on the economic history of France, published in 1916.

=== Foreign travel ===
From 1903 to 1914, Tarle travelled to France yearly. He researched in the libraries and archives of Western Europe for his early works and read a paper at the World Congress of Historical Studies held in London in 1913. The number of his works before the Revolution amounted to 211. His most notable publications before the revolution were:

- Kontinentalnaia blokada v. I: Issledovaniia po istorii promyshelennosti i vneshnei torgovli Frantsii v epokhu Napoleona [The Continental Blockade V. I: Studies in the History of French Industry and Trade under Napoleon] in 1913
- Ekonomicheskaia zhizn korolestva Italii v tsarstvovaniie Napoleona [The Economic Situation of Italy during the Napoleonic Era], which was first published in 1916 and in the following years also in French (1928) and Italian (1950).
- Pechat’vo Frantsii pri Napoleone [The French Press under Napoleon] published in 1913
- Rabochii klass vo Frantsii v epokhu revoliutsii [The French Working Class during the Revolution] (1909–1911)

=== Soviet era and exile ===
Russian historical scholarship was deeply affected by the October Revolution. Despite this, Tarle remained at the University of St. Petersburg. From 1918 on, he headed the Petrograd department of the Central Archives of RSFSR. He soon became a professor at Moscow University and moved to Moscow. In 1921, he became a corresponding member of the Russian Academy of Sciences, becoming a full member in 1927. He was also active in the Russian Association of Scientific Institutes for Research in the Social Sciences (RANION). From 1922 to 1924, he published an annual journal of general history along with Fyodor Uspensky.

During 1928–1931, Tarle was frequently criticized by his colleagues in articles published in Istorik-Marksist and in Borba Klassov. Between 1929 and 1931, a group of prominent historians were arrested by the State Political Directorate following the Academic Case (also known as The Case of Platonov). They were accused of hatching a plot to overthrow the Soviet government. On 8 August 1931, Tarle was exiled to Almaty where he spent the next four years.

=== Post-exile ===
After Tarle returned from exile, he resumed his academic work in Leningrad and wrote two works on the Napoleonic period: a biography of Napoleon (Napoleon) published in 1936, and Napoleon’s Invasion of Russia, 1812 published in 1938.

Tarle's description of the Napoleonic Empire in Napoleon (1936) has been perceived as a study in the classic Marxist tradition. He repeated the basic ideas of Mikhail Pokrovsky on the 1812 campaign and interpreted Napoleon from the viewpoint of class struggle. Like Pokrovsky, Tarle treated the Russian people's patriotism.

The Battle of Borodino was not termed a victory in his work, and the resistance to Napoleon was claimed as "never a popular, national war". He stated that "there was no mass participation by the peasantry in the guerilla bands and in their activities, and their part in the campaign was strictly limited". According to Tarle, “... it is clear that if the Spanish guerilla warfare might justifiably be called a national war, it would be impossible to apply this term to any Russian movement in the war of 1812". Tarle supported his interpretation by "denying that the peasants fought against the French and describing the burning of Smolensk and Moscow as systematic acts of the Russian army in retreat". Tarle also gave references to Lenin's words on Napoleon in his book. According to Black, when first published in 1936 Tarle's biography of Napoleon was accepted as "the final word in the analysis of the 1812 campaign" but was subject to criticism.

The same year brought a change to Soviet historiography: a critical approach toward the 1812 campaign was no longer permitted. Tarle prepared a new work in a comparatively shorter time and published it in 1938 under the title Napoleon’s Invasion of Russia, 1812. This book was translated into English and published in Great Britain in 1942. In his new book, Tarle mixed Marxist ideology and Russian nationalism. This time, the War of 1812 was not presented as unexceptional, and a strong emphasis was placed on Russian patriotism.

=== Post-World War II ===
Tarle spent the Great Patriotic War in Kazan. From 1941 to 1943, he worked as a professor in the historico-philological department of the Vladimir Ulyanov-Lenin Kazan State University. Beginning in 1942, he was also a member of the Extraordinary State Commission that investigated Nazi war crimes.

In 1951, Bolshevik published an article written by Sergey Kozhukhov, the director of the War Museum in Borodino. Tarle was accused of using foreign sources to the detriment of Russian ones, emphasizing the passive character of Kutuzov's maneuvers, and claiming that Kutuzov was continuing the tactics of Barclay de Tolly. In addition, Tarle was attacked for failing to evaluate the Battle of Borodino as a clear-cut Russian victory, stating that Moscow was burned by the Russians themselves, and assigning too much significance to the expanses of Russia, with cold and hunger being key factors in the defeat of the French army. According to Kozhukhov, Napoleon's Invasion of Russia, 1812, indicated the influence of bourgeois historiography. Tarle had not been sufficiently critical of "aristocratic-bourgeois" historians and had distorted the history of the "Fatherland War".

Tarle replied to Kozhukhov's criticism, stating that he had already begun work on a new book of the Napoleonic period, which would contain different interpretations than his earlier works. Tarle wrote, "In light of the recent victory over the Nazis, it was no longer possible to view Russian history, especially military history, in the same way. Valuable new materials and chiefly Stalin’s enormously significant and illuminating judgment had obliged Soviet historians to correct their errors and revise their interpretations of the war of 1812".

Among Tarle's works, his interpretation of the Crimean War drew attention in the society of historians. Tarle began working on the history of the Crimean War in the late 1930s and was given access to otherwise inaccessible Russian archives for his work. The first volume, published in 1941, was awarded the Stalin Prize. The second volume appeared in 1943.

Tarle's complete work was entitled "The City of Russian Glory: Sevastopol in 1854–1855" and was published in 1954 by the USSR Defense Ministry. The book was based on the two-volume study about the Crimean War, written by Tarle earlier. He compares the Siege of Sevastopol in 1854–1855 to the Siege of Sevastopol in 1941–1942 while attacking Washington, Hitlerism, and West Germany. Tarle presented the Crimean War to the public as a war launched by the Western states.

=== Death ===
Yevgeny Viktorovich Tarle died on 6 January 1955 in Moscow, before he could fulfill his intention of writing another book on the War of 1812. He was buried at the Novodevichy Cemetery. His wife, Olga Tarle (1874–1955), died just a month later and was buried near him; they had lived together for over 60 years. The couple had two adult children, both of which went on to work in mathematical economy.

== Works ==
- History of Italy in the Middle Ages («История Италии в средние века»)
- West and Russia («Запад и Россия»)
- Адмирал Ушаков на Средиземном море (1798–1800) [Admiral Ushakov at the Mediterranean Sea].
- Экспедиция адмирала Сенявина в Средиземное море (1805–1807) [The expedition of Admiral D. N. Senyavin to the Mediterranean Sea].
- Napoleon's Invasion of Russia, 1812 (New York, Oxford University Press, 1942, 1971; originally published in Russian in 1938).
- Borodino
- Napoleon
- Talleyrand
- Gorod russkoi slavy. Sevastopol v 1854–1855 gg. (Moscow: Voennoe izdatelstvo Ministerstva oborony Soiuza SSR, 1954.
- Krymskaia voina, 2 vols. (Moscow and Leningrad, 1950).
- Nakhimov. Moscow, 1948.

== Reviews ==
- Bernstein, S. (1942). "Review of Napoleon's Invasion of Russia — 1812, by Eugene Tarlé". Science & Society. 6 (3): 300–304. doi:10.1177/003682374200600315. JSTOR 40399491.
- Beutin, L. (1933). "Review of Le Blocus Continental et le Royaume d'Italie. La situation économique de l'Italie sous Napoléon I er d'après des documents inédits. Nouvelle édition by Eugène Tarlé". Vierteljahrschrift für Sozial- und Wirtschaftsgeschichte. 26 (3): 292–294. JSTOR 20726604.
- Dutcher, G. M. (1942). "Review of Napoleon's Invasion of Russia, 1812, by Eugene Tarlé". The Journal of Modern History. 14 (4): 537–538. doi:10.1086/236673. JSTOR 1876286.
- Fedotoff-White, D. N. (1949). "Review of Talleyrand [in Russian], by E. V. Tarle". The American Historical Review. 55 (1): 125–126. doi:10.1086/ahr/55.1.125.
- Fischer, M. (1942). "Russia at War: Review of Napoleon's Invasion of Russia, 1812, by Eugene Tarlé; Moscow War Diary, by Alexander Werth". The Virginia Quarterly Review. 18 (3): 465–470. JSTOR 26448331.
- Frederiksen, O. J. (1942). "Review of Napoleon's Invasion of Russia - 1812, by Eugene Tarlé; War and Peace, by Leo Tolstoy, Louise, Aylmer Maude, Clifton Fadiman". The Russian Review. 2 (1): 115–116. doi:10.2307/125281. JSTOR 125281.
- Gerhard, D. (1943). "Review of Napoleon's Invasion of Russia, 1812, by Eugene Tarlé". The American Historical Review. 48 (2): 309–312. doi:10.1086/ahr/48.2.309. JSTOR 1840784.
- Gershoy, L. (1942). "When Russia Thwarted Napoleon: Review of Napoleon's Invasion of Russia —1812, by Eugene Tarlé". Current History. 2 (9): 226–227. JSTOR 45309578.
- Mathiez, A. (1928). "Review of Le Blocus continental et le royaume d'Italie. La situation économique de l'Italie sous Napoléon I er by Eugène Tarlé". Annales historiques de la Révolution française, 5e Année (27): 276–278. JSTOR 41923757.
- Melvin, F. E. (1929). "Review of Situation Économique de l'Italie sous Napoléon Ier, by Eugène Tarlé". The American Historical Review. 34 (3): 587–588. doi:10.1086/ahr/34.3.587. JSTOR 1836301.
- Pingaud, A. (1928). "Review of Le Blocus continental et le royaume d'Italie. La situation économique de l'Italie sous Napoléon I er, d'après des documents inédits, by Eugène Tarlé". Revue Historique. 157 (2): 387–388. JSTOR 40942959.
- Quigley, C. (1942). "Review of Napoleon's Invasion of Russia - 1812, by Eugene Tarlé". The Catholic Historical Review. 28 (2): 260–261. JSTOR 25014159.
- Sée, H. (1928). "Review of Le Blocus Continental et le royaume d'Italie. La situation économique de l'Italie d'après des documents inédits, by Eugène Tarlé". Revue d'histoire moderne. 3e (14): 147–148. JSTOR 20524667.
- Smith, D. B. (1928). "Review of Le Blocus Continental et le Royaume d'Italie, by Eugene Tarlé". The Scottish Historical Review. 25 (100): 344–346. JSTOR 25525871.
