= Robert Wipper =

Russian historian (1859–1954)

- Роберт Виппер
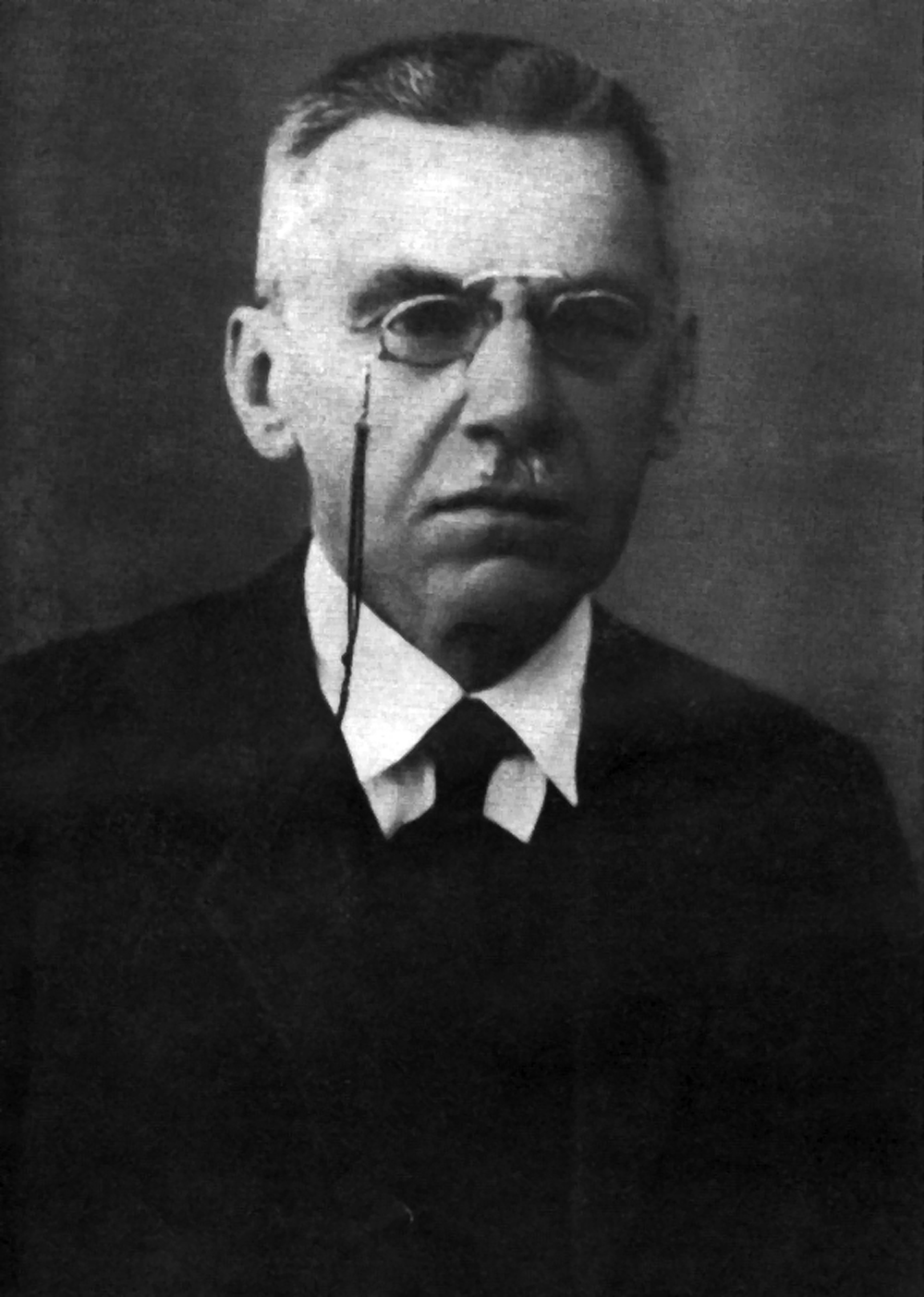
- Wipper in 1910
- Born: Robert Yuryevich Wipper; 14 July 1859; Moscow, Russian Empire
- Died: 30 December 1954 (aged 95); Moscow, Russian SFSR, Soviet Union
- Education: Doctor of Sciences (1894); Academician of the Russian Academy of Sciences
- Alma mater: Imperial Moscow University (1880)
- Children: Boris Vipper
- Scientific career
- Fields: History
- Workplaces: Imperial Moscow University
- Thesis: Church and state in Geneva of the 16th century in the era of Calvinism

Robert Yuryevich Wipper (Russian: Роберт Юрьевич Виппер, romanized: Robert Yuryevich Vipper; Latvian: Roberts Vipers; 14 July [O.S. 2 July] 1859 – 30 December 1954) was a Russian, Latvian and Soviet historian of classical antiquity, and the medieval and modern periods.

== Biography ==
Born in Moscow, Wipper graduated from the faculty of history and philology at the Moscow University in 1880. In 1894, he had become the Doctor of General History and in 1901–1919 was the Professor in Ordinary of the Department of General History. He later attained the professorship. Wipper lectured the history of prehistoric culture, the history of the Ancient East, Greece, the Roman Republic and the Roman Empire, as well as social ideas and the methodology of history. He also authored several historical textbooks.

Having emigrated to Latvia, he taught at the University of Latvia until 1940 when the country was incorporated into the Soviet Union as the Latvian Soviet Socialist Republic. Wipper's works received the privilege of translation into English for foreign readership. In 1922, Wipper published a book about Ivan the Terrible. A revised edition of it, published in 1942, was welcomed by Soviet reviewers. The History of Greece of the Classic Epoch (1916) was a personal favorite of Joseph Stalin. In 1944, Wipper received the Order of the Red Banner of Labour and the Order of Lenin in 1945. He also became a member of the Academy of Sciences of the Soviet Union. Until his death, Wipper supported the Christ myth theory.

The first edition of the Great Soviet Encyclopedia characterized him as "the most talented representative in historical science of the Russian petty bourgeois intelligentsia". He died in Moscow at the age of 95.

== Bibliography ==
- Andreev, A.; Tsygankov, D. (2010). Imperial Moscow University: 1755-1917: encyclopedic dictionary. Moscow: Russian political encyclopedia (ROSSPEN). pp. 129–130. ISBN 978-5-8243-1429-8.
- Maike Sach. Ein russischer Exil-Historiker in Riga. Robert Ju. Vipper (1859-1954) und sein Beitrag zur lettischen Geschichtswissenschaft in der Zwischenkriegszeit // Baltische Politiker, Historiker und Publizisten des 20. Jahrhunderts. Hrsg. Norbert Angermann, Detlef Henning, Wilhelm Lenz. Berlin: Lit, 2021, S. 381-406.
- Die drei Leben eines Historikers. Robert Vipper (1859–1954) in der russischen, lettischen und sowjetischen Geschichtsschreibung. Ed. Jan Kusber, Ilgvars Misāns, Maike Sach. Berlin: Peter Lang, 2024.
