= Alexander Mervart =

Russian ethnographer (1884–1932)

Alexander Mikhailovich Mervart (Russian: Александр Михайлович Мерварт; real first name was Gustav Hermann Christian Meerwarth) (1884–1932) was born at Bruchsal/Germany, became a Russian indologist, ethnographer, linguist and the first Russian Tamilan studies.

== Career ==
In 1913, Mervart was appointed head of the Indian department at the Museum of Anthropology & Ethnography. In 1914–1918, he and his wife, Lyudmila Aleksandrovna Mervart, explored much of the territory of South India and Ceylon, on a trip organised by Russian Academy of Sciences. They also visited Malaya, Singapore and Indonesia. As a result of their expeditions, Mervart managed to assemble a large and unique collection of artefacts and objects of folk art from all over South and Southeast Asia.

Upon his return to Leningrad, Mervart became a member of staff at the Museum of Anthropology & Ethnography (1924-1930) alongside Lyudmila. Together they published Report on the Ethno-graphical Expedition to India in 1914-18.

Mervart also became a teacher at the Leningrad State University, where he would be the first one in Russia to introduce the course of the Tamil language to the curriculum. In 1926–1929, Mervart published around 20 scientific works (including two monographs) and numerous articles. He also worked at the Kunstkamera.

In December 1929, according to other sources (Memorial), on 13 January 1930 he was arrested on trumped-up charges in the Academics' Case, accused of espionage and on 8 August 1931 sentenced to five years of imprisonment by the OGPU Collegium. Alexander Mervart was sent to the Ukhtinsko-Pechorsky Labor Camp.

He died at Utpetchlager on 23 May 1932.
