= Vyacheslav Volgin =

Russian Soviet historian (1879–1962)

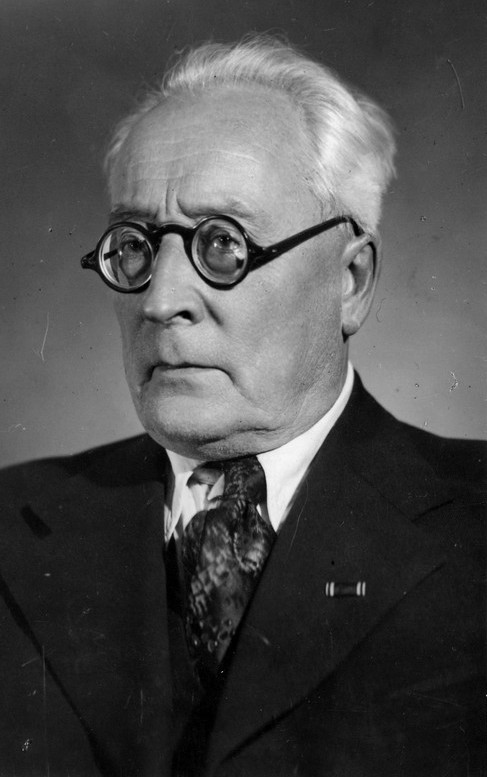
- Born: Vyacheslav Petrovich Volgin; 14 June 1879; Borshchyovka village, Khomutovsky District, Kursk Governorate, Russian Empire
- Died: 3 July 1962 (aged 83); Moscow, Soviet Union
- Occupation: Historian

Signature
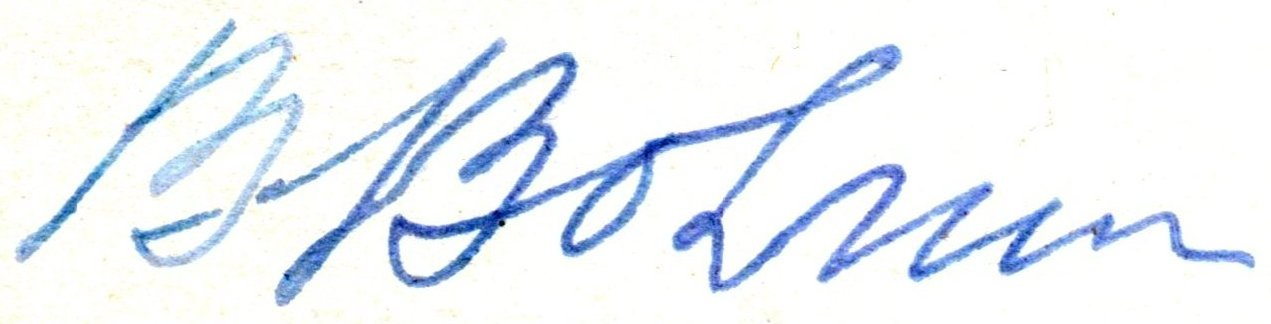

Vyacheslav Petrovich Volgin (Russian: Вячесла́в Петро́вич Во́лгин; 14 June [O.S. 2 June] 1879 – 3 July 1962) was a Soviet and Russian historian who wrote a number of books on early forms or precursors of communism, and who became vice-president of the Academy of Sciences of the Soviet Union.

== Early years ==
Vyacheslav Petrovich Volgin was born in Borshchyovka village, Khomutovsky District, Kursk Governorate, Russia on 14 June 1879. Between 1897 and 1908 he attended Moscow University, where he studied first physics and mathematics, then history and philology. A committed Marxist, he was repeatedly arrested during this period. He published his first scientific paper in 1906, on the German labor movement. In 1908 he wrote a study on A Revolutionary Communist of the 18th Century (Jean Meslier and his Testament). (Note: Jean Meslier was a Catholic priest who was discovered, upon his death, to have written a book-length philosophical essay promoting atheism - his Testament.) The study was published in 1919. During World War I, Volgin was a contributor to Maxim Gorky's Chronicles. Before the Revolution Volgin was a member of the Russian Social Democratic Labour Party since 1901 and became a Menshevik in 1914. He joined the Russian Communist Party (Bolsheviks) in 1920.

== Post-revolution ==
In 1918 Volgin helped organize the Socialist Academy in Moscow, which later became the Communist Academy. He was a professor of the history of socialism at Moscow State University (MGU) from 1921 to 1930, and rector of the university from 1921 to 1925. One of the first challenges that he faced as rector was to reform the VUZy (ВУЗ – высшее учебное заведение, "higher educational institutions") to ensure that their teachers and staff were ideologically sound. It took a huge effort to ensure that the correct people were elected. In August 1922 there was a purge of intellectuals. One of Volgin's predecessors as rector of MGU, Mikhail Mikhailovich Novikov, was placed under house arrest. Despite protests by Volgin, a few days later the State Political Directorate (GPU) told Novikov they were deporting him. Volgin did what he could to minimize the impact of the purge, trying to ensure that where the charges were minor the teachers could continue to teach.

Volgin became president of the council of the sector of scientific workers of Rabpros (Russian: Рабпрос) (Trade Union of Education Workers (Russian: Профсоюз РАБотников ПРОСвещения)), the official educational workers' union. From 1919 to 1929 he was a member of the National Scientific Council, and from 1921 to 1922 Deputy Chairman of the Main Committee of Vocational Education of the RSFSR People's Commissariat. He was an organizer of the Russian Association of Research Institutes of Social Sciences (RANION), Institute of History of the Communist Academy and the Society of Marxist Historians. Volgin was permanent secretary of the Academy of Sciences of the Soviet Union (AN USSR) from 1930 to 1935, and vice-president of the AN USSR from 1942 to 1953.

Volgin was Chairman of the Group for the Study of French history at the Institute of History of the Academy of Sciences. As Vice-President of the Academy of Sciences, he had authority over how books from abroad would be distributed to libraries and institutions of the Academy of Sciences. Volgin did what he could to ensure that the academy followed the communist party line and concentrated on "useful" work. Volgin edited a number of scientific periodicals and historical anthologies. He launched and edited the multi-volume series The precursors of scientific socialism in 1947. He was awarded the Lenin Prize in 1961. He died in Moscow on 3 July 1962, aged 83. His name was given to the V.P. Volgin Fundamental Library of the Social Sciences of the Academy of Sciences of the Soviet Union.

== Academic contributions ==
Volgin spent many years researching the history of social thinking in France before the French Revolution, developing an original view of the nature of the ideological struggle during this period. One of the subjects he studied was the teaching of the philosopher Charles Fourier, publishing two articles that analyzed Fourier's views. In 1924 he published a major work Sen-Simon i Sen-Simonizm on Saint-Simon and the resulting Saint-Simonianist movement. He also published in depth biographies of French proto-communist thinkers and activists such as Jean Meslier, Gabriel Bonnot de Mably, Étienne-Gabriel Morelly and François-Nöel Babeuf.

Volgin was the most active of Soviet academics in the study of classic utopias. He published and wrote the prefaces to editions of Tommaso Campanella (1934), Thomas More (1935) and Robert Owen (1950). In his introduction to the 1934 Russian-language version of Campanella's work The City of the Sun, Volgin identified the monastic life as an early form of "communist utopia", emphasizing "the absence of private property, the universal obligation of labor (which is considered a matter of honor), the social organization of production and distribution, and the training through labor of the inhabitants."

== Bibliography ==
Selected works:

- Volgin, V. P. (1924). Sen-Simon i Sen-Simonizm. Moscow: Kommunisticheskaya Akademiya.
- Volgin, V. P. (1931) [1928]. Istorija socialističeskich idej (parts 1 & 2). Gosudarstv. Izdatel'stvo.
- Volgin, V. P. (1940). Social'nye i političeskie idei vo Francii pered revoljuciej (1748–1789). Izd. Akademii nauk SSSR. p. 190.
- Volgin, V. P.; Tarle, E. V.; Pankratova, A. M. (1942). 25 let istoričeskoj nauki v SSSR: Pod redakciej Volgina V.P. Tarle E.V. i Pankratovoj A.M. Izdatelstvo Akademii Nauk Sojuza SSR. p. 288.
- Volgin, V. P. (1945). Referaty naučno-issledovatel'skich rabot za 1944 god: Otdelenie istorii i filosofii, Akademija nauk Sojuza SSR. Izd. Akad. nauk SSSR. p. 61.
- Volgin, V. P. (1945). Očerki po istorii Akademii Nauk: Istoričeskie nauki.
- Volgin, Vjačeslav Petrovič (1955). Humanisme et socialisme. Izd. Akademii Nauk SSSR. p. 63.
