= Matvei Lyubavsky =

Russian academic and historian (1860–1936)

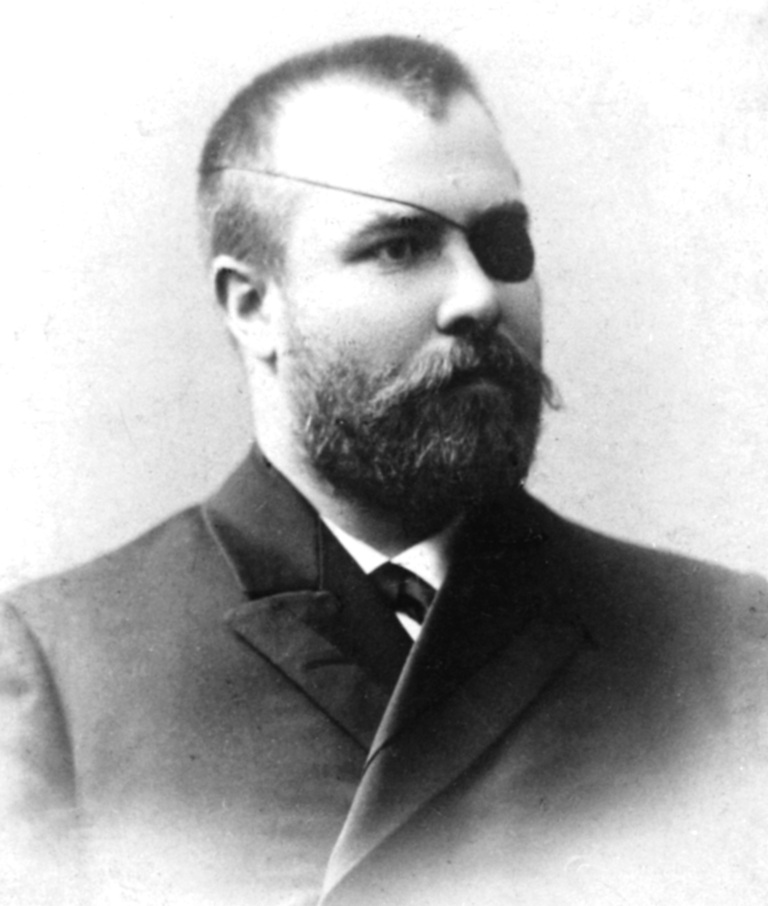
Matvei Lyubavsky

Matvey Kuzmich Lyubavsky (Russian: Матве́й Кузьми́ч Люба́вский; 13 August [O.S. 1 August], 1860, Ryazan Governorate – 22 November 1936, Ufa) was a Russian and Soviet historian, professor, academic, and rector of the Moscow University from 1911 to 1917.

== Biography ==
Lyubavsky was born in to the family of a village deacon. He lost his left eye in an accident during childhood. Lyubavsky graduated from the faculty of History of the Imperial Moscow University in 1882 and received his doctorate in 1901 and became a professor at the Moscow University.

After the removal of Alexander Manuilov as rector of the Imperial Moscow University in 1911 for political reasons, Lyubavsky was elected as his successor. He opposed the politicization of the educational process, for the preservation of university autonomy, sought to preserve university traditions and a high level of teaching after the departure of many talented scientists. In 1913, he was elected chairman of the Society for Russian History and Antiquities at Moscow University.

Lyubavsky accepted the February Revolution and the return of his former colleagues to the university, however he did recognize the October Revolution like most of the Russian intellectuals of the period.

After the October Revolution, he began to cooperate with the authorities in the name of saving the country's historical and cultural heritage, its archives. In 1918, he was the head of the Moscow branch of the Moscow Regional Department of Archival Affairs (Glavarkhiv) and until 1920 he was a member of the board, deputy chairman of the Glavarkhiv. In 1920, he was an expert-consultant on archival issues of the People's Commissariat of Foreign Affairs, participated in the Riga conference on the conclusion of a peace treaty between the RSFSR and Poland. From 1920 to 1929, he was the director of the Moscow branch of the legal section of the Unified State archival fund.

He became an Academician of the Academy of Sciences of the Soviet Union in 1929 (Corresponding Member of the Russian Academy of Sciences since 1917).

On 8 August 1930, Lyubavsky was arrested in the so-called "Academic Case" and was in pre-trial detention for a year. In February 1931, his son Valerian was arrested and executed in June for "counter-revolutionary activities". On 8 August 1931, the OGPU Collegium passed a verdict, depriving Lyubavsky of the title of academician and assigning him five years of exile and was exiled to Ufa.

While in exile, he actively collaborated with the Institute of National Culture of the Bashkir ASSR, where during 1932–1934 he worked on the history of land tenure and class struggle in these lands in the 17th and 18th centuries.

He was released on 5 November 1935. Lyubavsky died in Ufa shortly after the expiration of his term of exile, on 22 November 1936. He was buried at the Sergievsky cemetery in Ufa. He was rehabilitated in 1967.

== Bibliography ==
- Областное деление и местное управление Литовско-русского государства ко времени издания первого Литовского статута: Исторические очерки Матвея Любавского. — М.: Унив. тип., 1892. — VI, 884, С, II с. Магистерская диссертация, удостоенная премии Г. Ф. Карпова и малой премии графа С. С. Уварова.
- Начальная история малорусского казачества // Журнал Министерства народного просвещения. 1895. — № 7. — С. 217—244
- Литовско-русский Сейм. Опыт по истории учреждения в связи с внутренним строем и внешней жизнью государства. М.: Университетская тип. 1900. Докторская диссертация
- История царствования Екатерины II: Курс, чит. в Имп. Моск. ун-те весной 1911 г. / Проф. М. К. Любавский; Изд. О-ва взаимопомощи студентов-филологов по зап. студ. Ю. С. Ильина. — [Москва, 1912?]. — 222 с.
- Московский университет в 1812 году. — М., 1913. — 68 с.: ил.; [13 л. ил.].
- Очерк истории Литовско-Русского государства до Люблинской унии включительно. С приложением текста хартий, выданных княжеству Литовскому и его областям. М.: Московская художественная печатня. 1915.
- История западных славян (прибалтийских, чехов и поляков). М.: Товарищество скоропечатни А. А. Левенсон. 1917.
- Лекціи по древней русской исторіи до конца XVI вѢка (3-е изд ed.). М.: М. и С.Сабашниковыхъ. 1918.
- Основные моменты истории Белоруссии: Доклад, читанный на первом публичном заседании Белорусского научно-культурного общества в Москве 1 (14) июля 1918 года. — М.: тип. А. П. Яроцкого, 1918. — 23 с.
- Образование основной государственной территории великорусской народности: заселение и объединение центра / М. К. Любавский; Акад. наук СССР, Археогр. комиссия. — Ленинград, 1929. -— 175, [1] с., 1 вкл. л. карт.
