= Yuri Figatner =

Soviet party functionary

- Юрий Фигатнер

Personal details
- Born: 1889
- Died: 20 September 1937 (aged 47–48) Seoul, Soviet Union
- Resting place: Donskoye Cemetery
- Party: CPSU

Yuri Petrovich Figatner (Russian: Юрий Петрович Фигатнер; 1889 – 20 September 1937) was a Soviet trade unionist, a People's Commissar of Internal Affairs of the Terek Soviet Republic, a member of the Central Committee of the USSR of the 1st-5th convocations and a Member of the Central Control Commission of the CPSU(b) in 1925–1934. He was executed during the Great Purge and rehabilitated during the Khrushchev Thaw.

== Early years ==
Yuri Petrovich (Yakiv Isaakovich) Figatner was born in the family of a craftsman in Odessa, Russian Empire. He did not receive a formal education, but obtained his primary education independently.

Figatner joined the Bolshevik faction of the RSDLP in 1903. In 1903-1905 he took part in the revolutionary movement in Odessa, then was active in 1905–1906 in Warsaw. From 1906 to 1908 he lived in exile in the city of Liege, Belgium and from 1908 to 1909 in Paris, France.

In 1909, Figatner returned to Russia and worked in the Moscow Committee of the RSDLP(b). In 1909, he was arrested and served in prison. In 1911, he was sentenced to seven years of hard labor, which he served in Moscow's Butyrka prison. In March 1917, he was amnestied and released.

== Soviet career ==
From May 1917, Figatner was the chairman of the Kislovodsk Council and a member of the Kislovodsk Committee of the RSDLP(b). From November 1917 to May 1920, he was a member of the Caucasian Regional Committee of the RSDLP(b). From March to July 29, 1918, and from 1918 to January 11, 1919, he was the People's Commissar of Internal Affairs of the Terek Soviet Republic, until it was overrun by the Volunteer Army led by Anton Denikin.

From August 1920, Figatner was the head of the Kuban-Black Sea Regional Council of Trade Unions. From August 1920 to April 1921, he was also a member of the Revolutionary Military Council of the Independent Caucasus Army, also known as the Caucasian Labor Army. From December 1920 to January 1922, he was the head of the Caucasian Bureau of the CPSU and a member of the Caucasian Bureau of the Central Committee of the RCP(b). From April 1921, he was the secretary of the Caucasian Bureau of the Central Committee of the RCP(b).

From January 1922 to December 1924, Figatner was the head of the Siberian Bureau of the CPSU and a member of the Siberian Bureau of the Central Committee of the RCP(b) and the Siberian Revolutionary Committee.

From December 1924 to 1929, Figatner was the chairman of the Central Committee of the All-Union Central Council of Trade Unions and a member of the Presidium of the CPSU. Beginning with the 14th Party Congress he was a member of the Central Control Commission of the All-Union Communist Party (b).

In August 1929 a government commission headed by Figatner was sent to Leningrad to "clean" the Academy of Sciences. The commission ordered the dismissal of 128 full-time employees (out of 960) and 520 supernumerary employees (out of 830). A number of those dismissed were subsequently charged with participating in a "monarchist counter-revolutionary organization" and other anti-Soviet efforts; some of those found guilty were exiled or sent to labor camps.

From February 1930 to 1932, Figatner was the head of the Main Inspectorate of the Supreme Soviet of the National Economy and a member of its Presidium. In 1932 he became a member of the collegium of the People's Commissariat of Heavy Industry.

In August 1936 he was made the head of the Main Department of Logging, Forestry and Smelting of the Northern Regions of the People's Commissariat of the Forestry Industry of the USSR and a member of the collegium of the People's Commissariat of the Forestry Industry of the USSR. Such reassignments to remote positions often preceded the subject's arrest and purge; in Figatner's case he was arrested by the NKVD on May 29, 1937.

Figatner was sentenced to death for "terrorist activities" by the Military Collegium of the Supreme Court of the USSR on September 20, 1937, and shot the same day. He was buried at the Donskoye Cemetery in Moscow.

On December 28, 1955, he was posthumously rehabilitated.
