= Federal Archival Agency =

Russian state archive management agency

- Федеральное архивное агентство

Agency overview
- Formed: 1918
- Jurisdiction: President of Russia
- Headquarters: Moscow
- Agency executive: Andrey Artizov
- Website: archives.gov.ru

The Federal Archival Agency of the Russian Federation (Russian: Федеральное архивное агентство Российской Федерации (Росархив), romanized: Federal'noye Arkhivnoye agentstvo Rossiyskoy Federatsii (Rosarkhiv)) is the federal executive body subordinate to the President of Russia which is responsible for providing public services, management of federal property in the field of archives.

== Duties ==
- Providing public services in the field of archives;
- Public accounting archives collections of the Russian Federation, of the State register of unique archives collections of the Russian Federation;
- Ensuring compliance with the rules of acquisition, storage, recording and use of archival documents.
