= Academy of Sciences of the Soviet Union =

Highest scientific institution of the Soviet Union (1925–1991)

- Академия наук Советского Союза
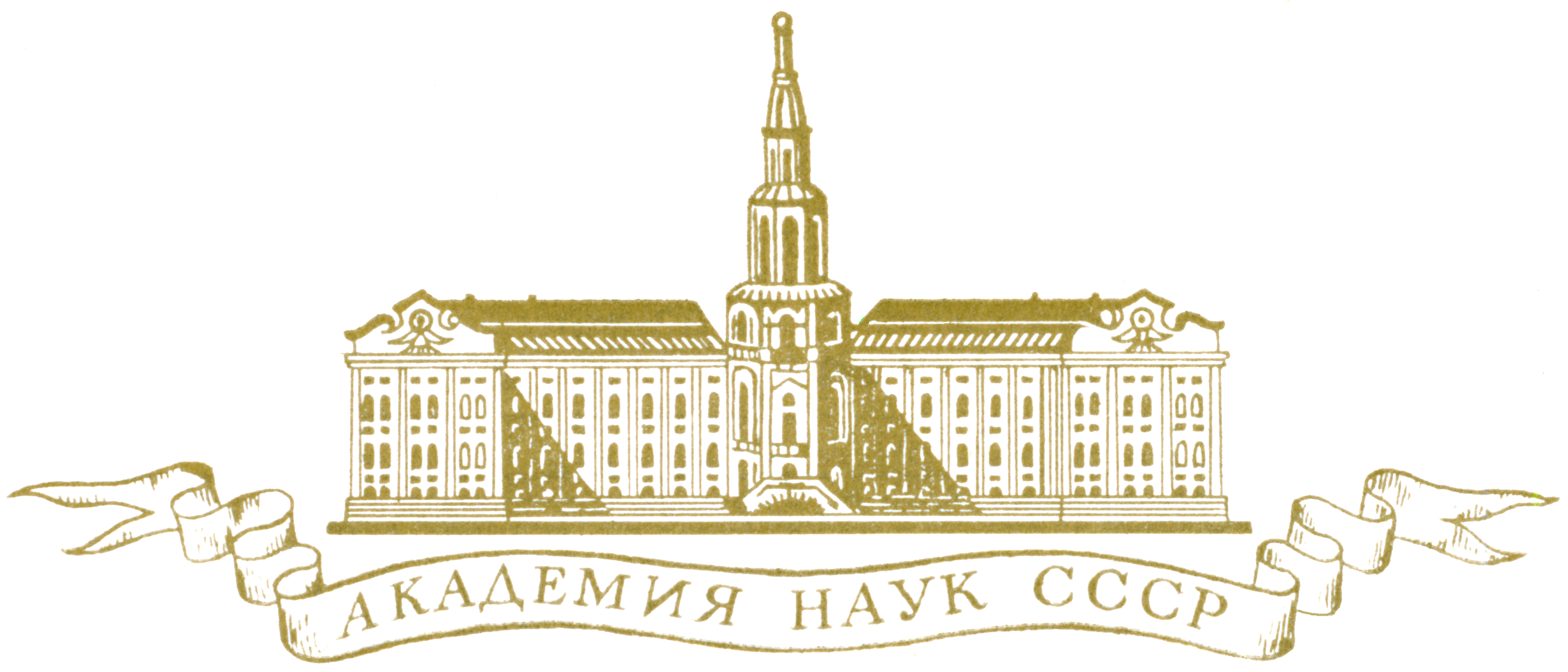
- Abbreviation: АН СССР
- Successor: Russian Academy of Sciences
- Formation: 1925
- Dissolved: 1991
- Type: Scientific institution
- Headquarters: Moscow
- Members: Two-level
- Official language: Russian

The Academy of Sciences of the Soviet Union was the highest scientific institution of the Soviet Union from 1925 to 1991. It united the country's leading scientists and was subordinated directly to the Council of Ministers of the Soviet Union (until 1946 the Council of People's Commissars of the Soviet Union).

In 1991, by the decree of the President of the Russian Soviet Federative Socialist Republic, the Russian Academy of Sciences was established on the basis of the Academy of Sciences of the Soviet Union.

== History ==
=== Creation of the Academy of Sciences of the Soviet Union ===
The Academy of Sciences of the Soviet Union was formed by a resolution of the Central Executive Committee and the Council of People's Commissars of the Soviet Union dated July 27, 1925, on the basis of the Russian Academy of Sciences (before the February Revolution – the Imperial Saint Petersburg Academy of Sciences). In the first years of Soviet Russia, the Institute of the Academy of Sciences was perceived rather ambiguously as a closed and elite scientific education. However, in 1918, after negotiations with the then leadership of the Academy of Sciences, which had already been renamed from "Imperial" to "Russian", cooperation began with the new government. The financing of the academy was entrusted to the People's Commissariat for Education and the Central Commission for the Improvement of the Life of Scientists. In 1925, its 200th anniversary was solemnly celebrated. A new charter was adopted for this date.

The first president of the Academy of Sciences of the Soviet Union was the well-known scientist, geologist Alexander Karpinsky, who previously held the presidency of the Russian Academy of Sciences.

Attempts to establish state and party control over the previously independent Academy began in the mid-1920s: in 1925 the academy was subordinated to the Council of People's Commissars of the Soviet Union. In 1928, under pressure from the authorities, a number of new Communist members were elected to it.

In January 1929, the academicians defiantly failed the three Communist candidates, Vladimir Fritsche, Nikolai Lukin and Abram Deborin, who were running for the Academy of Sciences, but already in February, under conditions of extreme pressure, they were forced to reconsider their decision.

In 1929, a government commission headed by Yuri Petrovich Figatner was sent to Leningrad to "cleanse" the academy. In June–December 1929, by its decision, 128 full-time employees (out of 960) and 520 supernumerals (out of 830) were dismissed from the Academy of Sciences. Sergey Oldenburg was removed from the post of the permanent secretary of the academy at the end of October 1929, defending her independence. After that, the party-state bodies established full control over the academy. A new Presidium of the Academy of Sciences was elected. Even before this, on February 25, 1929, the Politburo issued a special decision: to leave Alexander Karpinsky as president, Gleb Krzhizhanovsky, Nikolai Marr, and Vladimir Komarov as vice-presidents, and Vyacheslav Volgin as the permanent secretary. Thus, for the first time in the practice of the Academy of Sciences, its leading core was directively appointed at a meeting of the highest party body with subsequent automatic approval at the General Assembly, and this also became a precedent for subsequent practice.

During the period from December 1929 to December 1930, over 100 people were arrested under the "Academic Case" (mainly experts in the humanities, primarily historians).

In February – April 1930, a new charter of the Academy of Sciences was developed and approved. The development of the project was entrusted to an academic commission approved by the plenary session of the Committee for the Management of Scientists and Educational Institutions of the Central Executive Committee of the Soviet Union, headed by Vyacheslav Volgin. The first meeting of the commission to draw up a charter and reorganize the Academy of Sciences was held on February 28, 1930. The draft of the new charter was discussed and approved by the session of the Academy of Sciences on March 31 – April 5, 1930, and it approved the first work plan of the Academy of Sciences for 1931–1932. On April 4, 1930, the charter was adopted at the General Assembly.

In 1930, in connection with the reorganization of the Soviet government, the Academy of Sciences was transferred to the Central Executive Committee of the Soviet Union.

By the Decree of the Central Executive Committee of the Soviet Union of December 14, 1933 "On the transfer of the Academy of Sciences of the Soviet Union to the competence of the Council of People's Commissars of the Soviet Union" (before that, it was subordinated to the committee for the management of scientists and educational institutions of the Central Executive Committee of the Soviet Union).

=== Relocation of the organization to Moscow and further development ===
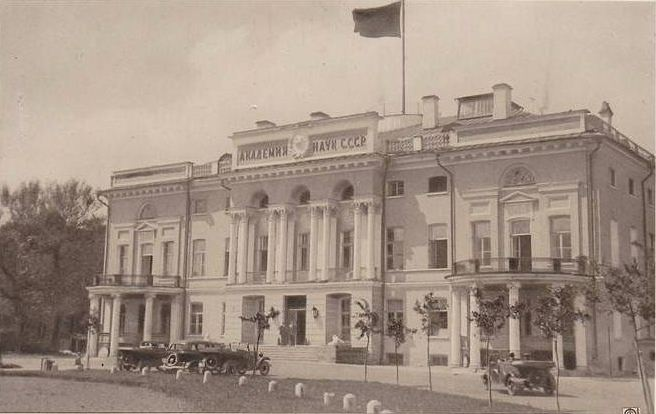
The building of the Presidium of the Academy of Sciences of the Soviet Union in Moscow (Alexandria Palace) from 1934. The photo was taken before 1940.

In 1934, the Presidium of the academy and 14 scientific institutes were transferred from Leningrad (formerly and now St. Petersburg) to Moscow (On April 25, 1934, Vyacheslav Molotov signed the corresponding decree of the Council of People's Commissars of the Soviet Union). As Felix Perchenok noted, "the transfer of the Academy of Sciences of the Soviet Union to Moscow – one of the most important steps towards turning it into the headquarters of Soviet science – was carried out in a fire order".

In 1935, the permanent secretary of the academy, Vyacheslav Volgin, wrote a letter to Joseph Stalin asking for his release from the position of permanent secretary. In the letter, he stressed that he alone was doing the difficult work of an indispensable secretary all the time, while other members of the party group only "threw out ideas", sometimes useful, sometimes fantastic. For five years in this post, Volgin not only could not continue his scientific work, but could not even read books in his specialty, could not follow the development of his science. "Meanwhile", he adds, "I was considered in the well-known narrow field as the best expert on the subject". "I'm already 56 years old", Vyacheslav Petrovich continues, "and there is not much time left for science. A few more years – and I will not be able to return to science". Moreover, in a letter to Stalin, he noted that in the party group, he no longer feels the former positive assessment of his work. On August 8, 1935, at a meeting of the Politburo, it was proposed to release Vyacheslav Volgin from the post of permanent secretary of the academy. On November 20, 1935, by resolution of the general meeting of the Academy of Sciences of the Soviet Union, he was thanked for his work in the governing bodies of the Academy of Sciences and freed from the duties of an indispensable secretary. His place was taken by the former affairs manager of the Council of People's Commissars Nikolai Gorbunov. By the decree of the Presidium of the Academy of Sciences of the Soviet Union dated June 26, 1937, this position was abolished altogether, and since that time administrative officers have performed the duties of secretaries.

On January 1, 1937, in the Academy of Sciences of the Soviet Union was:

- 88 – full members (academicians);
- 4,108 – scientific and scientific-technical employees (on October 1, 1937).

From 1945 to 1970, the total number of researchers (including faculty and research personnel of higher education) increased more than sevenfold: from 130 thousand to 950 thousand people. One of the notable figures of this time was the economist Lev Gatovsky, which became director of the Institute of Economics of the academy from 1965 to 1971. In 1980 and 1985, the total number of research workers was already 1.4 and 1.5 million, respectively. The total number of scientific, scientific, pedagogical, design and design organizations of various types from 1945 to 1985 also increased steadily and amounted in the Soviet Union as a whole to 1,700, 5,300, and 5,100 successively in 1945, 1970 and 1985.

By 1985, the Academy of Sciences of the Soviet Union had:

- 274 – full members (academicians);
- 542 – corresponding members;
- about 330 scientific institutions;
- 57,000 scientists and researchers, with a total number of employees in all institutions 217 thousand people.

For its achievements, the Academy of Sciences of the Soviet Union was twice awarded the Order of Lenin: in 1969 and 1974.

=== Branches and bases of the Academy of Sciences of the Soviet Union ===
In 1932, the Academy of Sciences of the Soviet Union organized its first branches – the Ural and the Far East – and research bases – the Kazakh and Tajik. In 1933, the Transcaucasian branch was established with branches in Armenia and Azerbaijan, and in 1934, the Kola Research Base. In 1935, Azerbaijan, and in 1936 the Armenian branch of the Transcaucasian branch were transformed into independent branches of the Academy of Sciences of the Soviet Union. In 1936, the Northern Base appeared, in 1939 the Uzbek Base, and in 1941, on the eve of the Great Patriotic War, the Turkmen branch.

By the end of 1941, the Academy of Sciences had 7 branches (Azerbaijan, Armenian, Kazakh, Tajik, Turkmen, Uzbek, and Ural), two research bases (Kola and North), and one mountain taiga station. The scientific institutions of the branches and bases of the Academy of Sciences of the Soviet Union at that time had about 1,500 scientific and technical workers, including 12 academicians, 11 corresponding members, 126 doctors, 284 candidates of science, 610 scientists without a scientific degree.

=== Reorganization after the collapse of the Soviet Union ===
In connection with the collapse of the Soviet Union, the scientific institutions of the Academy of Sciences of the Soviet Union, located in the former Soviet republics and which were part of the academies of sciences of the Union republics, became part of the new independent states. Only the Russian Federation did not have its own Academy of Sciences during the Soviet Union despite the fact that 98% of the scientific institutions of the Academy of Sciences of the Soviet Union were in the Russian Federation, and 95% of the members of the Academy of Sciences of the Soviet Union worked and lived in the Russian Federation. In fact, the Academy of Sciences of the Soviet Union was the Russian Academy of Sciences. On November 21, 1991, on the initiative of Russian academicians, a presidential decree was signed to create the Russian Academy of Sciences, according to which all members of the Academy of Sciences of the Soviet Union, including those living in the countries of the Commonwealth of Independent States, automatically became members of the Russian Academy of Sciences. All buildings, large scientific instruments, vessels, scientific equipment and other state property that was in the use and disposal of institutions and organizations of the Academy of Sciences of the Soviet Union located in the Russian Soviet Federative Socialist Republic were transferred to the ownership of the Russian Academy of Sciences. In December 1991, elections to the Russian Academy of Sciences were held, and the scientists who took part in these elections, together with the full members of the Academy of Sciences of the Soviet Union, constituted the Russian Academy of Sciences.

In 1992, the International Association of Academies of Sciences was established.

== Targets and goals ==
The objectives of the activities of the Academy of Sciences of the Soviet Union were to promote the full implementation of scientific advances in the practice of communist construction in the USSR; identification and development of the most important and fundamental areas of science. Coordination was also conducted through regional offices and republican academies of sciences.

The research activity of the academy was conducted in a network of institutes, laboratories, observatories. The network of the Academy of Sciences of the Soviet Union included 295 scientific institutions.

The Academy of Sciences of the Soviet Union had its own publishing house, a research fleet, a network of libraries. The Academy of Sciences of the Soviet Union awarded awards to scientists who have made significant contributions to the development of science.

Awards established by the Academy of Sciences of the Soviet Union

- Gold Medal named after Mikhail Vasilyevich Lomonosov was the highest award of the academy. Annually, two prizes were awarded to scientists (one Soviet and one foreign) for achievements in the natural and social sciences.
- Leonhard Euler Gold Medal was an award for outstanding results in mathematics and physics.
- Karl Marx Gold Medal was a prize awarded once every three years to Soviet and foreign scientists for outstanding work in the field of social sciences.
- Vernadsky Gold Medal was an award for outstanding scientific work in the field of earth sciences.
- Vavilov Gold Medal was an award for outstanding scientific work in the field of physics.
- Mendeleev Gold Medal was an award for outstanding scientific work in the field of chemical science and technology.
- Keldysh Gold Medal was the award for outstanding work in the field of applied mathematics and mechanics.
- Pavlov Gold Medal was a reward for outstanding work in the field of physiology of higher nervous activity and visceral systems.
- Andronov Prize was awarded for outstanding works in the classical mechanics and control theory

== Composition and structure ==
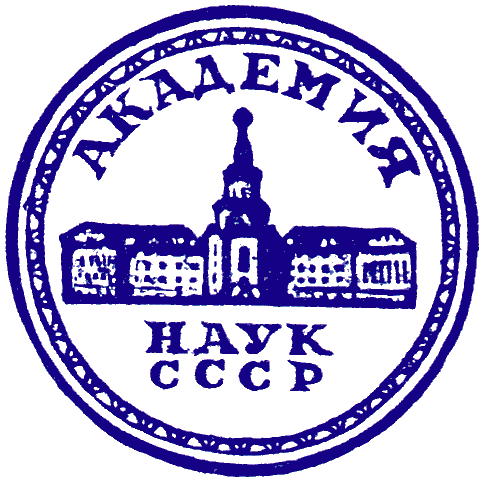
Logo of the Academy of Sciences of the Soviet Union

=== Number of members ===
On 1 January 1936 the Academy of Sciences had 98 active members.

In 1989, the academy consisted of:

- 323 active members;
- 586 corresponding members;
- 138 foreign members.

=== Governing bodies ===
The organs of the Academy of Sciences of the Soviet Union were formed exclusively on an electoral basis. The supreme body is the General Meeting of Academicians and Corresponding Members. To guide the academy in the periods between sessions of the General Assembly, it elects every 4 years the Presidium of the Academy of Sciences of the Soviet Union.

Presidents of the Academy of Sciences in the Soviet period:

- 1917–1936 – Alexander Karpinsky;
- 1936–1945 – Vladimir Komarov;
- 1945–1951 – Sergey Vavilov;
- 1951–1961 – Alexander Nesmeyanov;
- 1961–1975 – Mstislav Keldysh;
- 1975–1986 – Anatoly Alexandrov;
- 1986–1991 – Gury Marchuk.

=== Structure ===
The Academy of Sciences of the Soviet Union consisted of fourteen (from 1956) republican academies (the Russian Soviet Federative Socialist Republic did not have its own academy) and three regional branches in the Russian Soviet Federative Socialist Republic: Siberian (1957), Far Eastern (1987) and Ural (1987).

The academy was also divided into sections, each with its own departments:

- Section of Physical, Technical and Mathematical Sciences. Departments: mathematics, general physics and astronomy, nuclear physics, physical and technical problems of energy, mechanics and control processes.
- Section of Chemical, Technological and Biological Sciences. Departments: general and technical chemistry; physical chemistry and technology of inorganic materials; biochemistry, biophysics and chemistry of physiologically active compounds; physiology; general biology.
- Section of Earth Sciences. Departments: geology, geophysics and geochemistry; oceanology, atmospheric physics, geography.
- Section of Social Sciences. Departments: history; philosophy and law; economy; literature and language.

=== Commissions of the Academy of Sciences of the Soviet Union ===
- Archaeographic Commission;
- Transcaucasian Commission – work around Lake Sevan;
- Polar Commission – work on the island of Novaya Zemlya;
- Nuclear Commission;
- Commission on bases of the Academy of Sciences of the Soviet Union;
- Commission on the study of natural productive forces;
- Commission for the integrated study of the Caspian Sea;
- Expeditionary Research Commission;
- Commission for the Study of the Tribal Composition of the Population of the Soviet Union and Neighboring Countries;
- Permanent Historical Commission;
- Mudflow Commission;
- Uranium Commission;

and others.

== Criticism ==
Critics noted that, despite the broadest powers and formal responsibility for the state and development of all science in the Soviet Union, during its existence, the Academy of Sciences of the Soviet Union did not come up with any serious project reforming Soviet science.

== Recognition ==
Filmography

- "Country and Science." Documentary. Central Studio for Documentary Film. 1974. 50 minutes.

In philately

Postage stamps of the Soviet Union

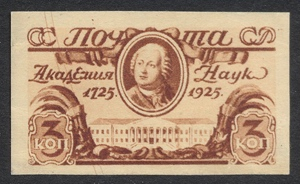
3 kopeck postage stamp of the Soviet Union, 1925: 200 years of the Academy of Sciences of the Soviet Union

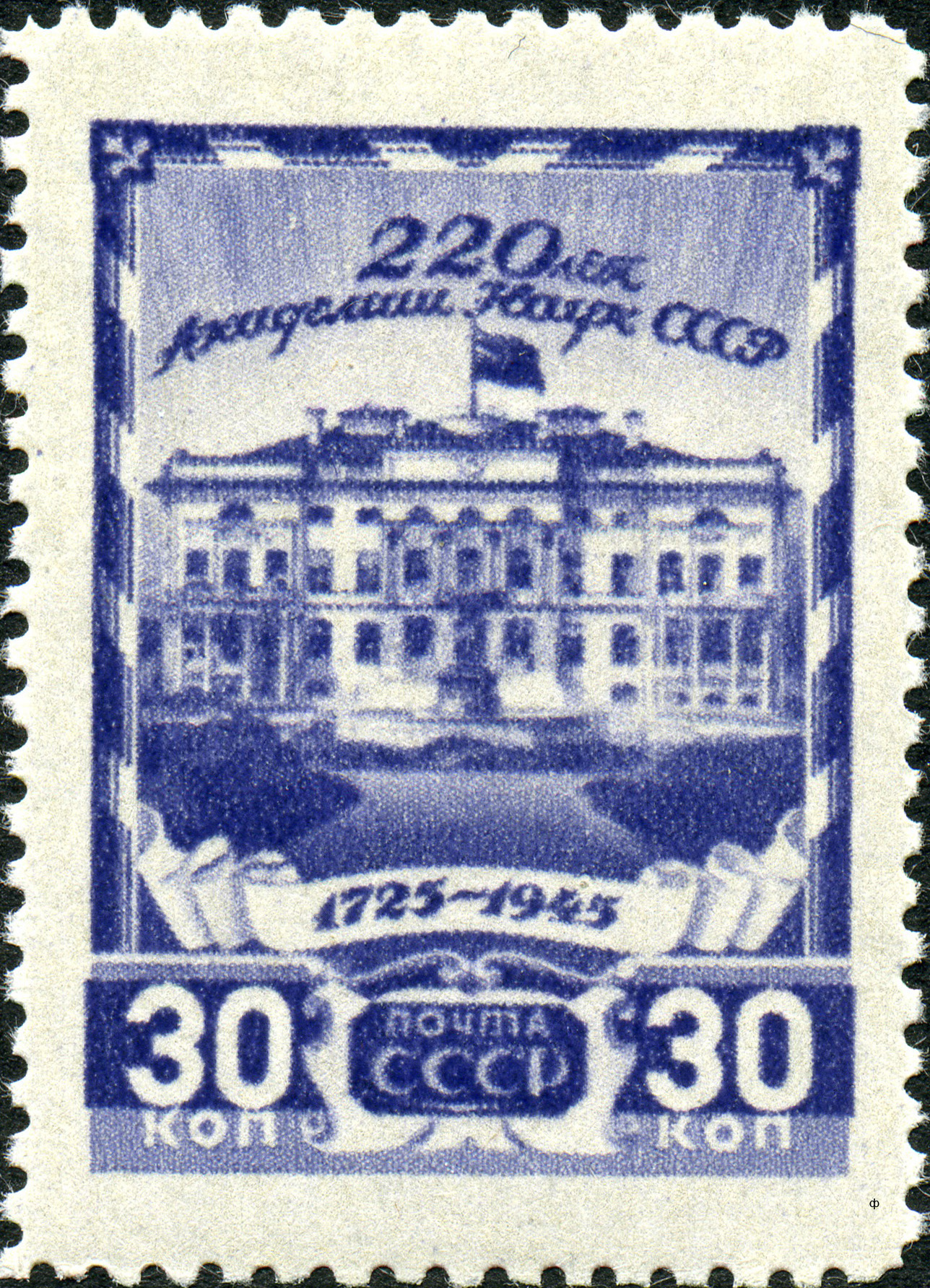
30 kopeck postage stamp of the Soviet Union, 1945: 220 years of the Academy of Sciences of the Soviet Union

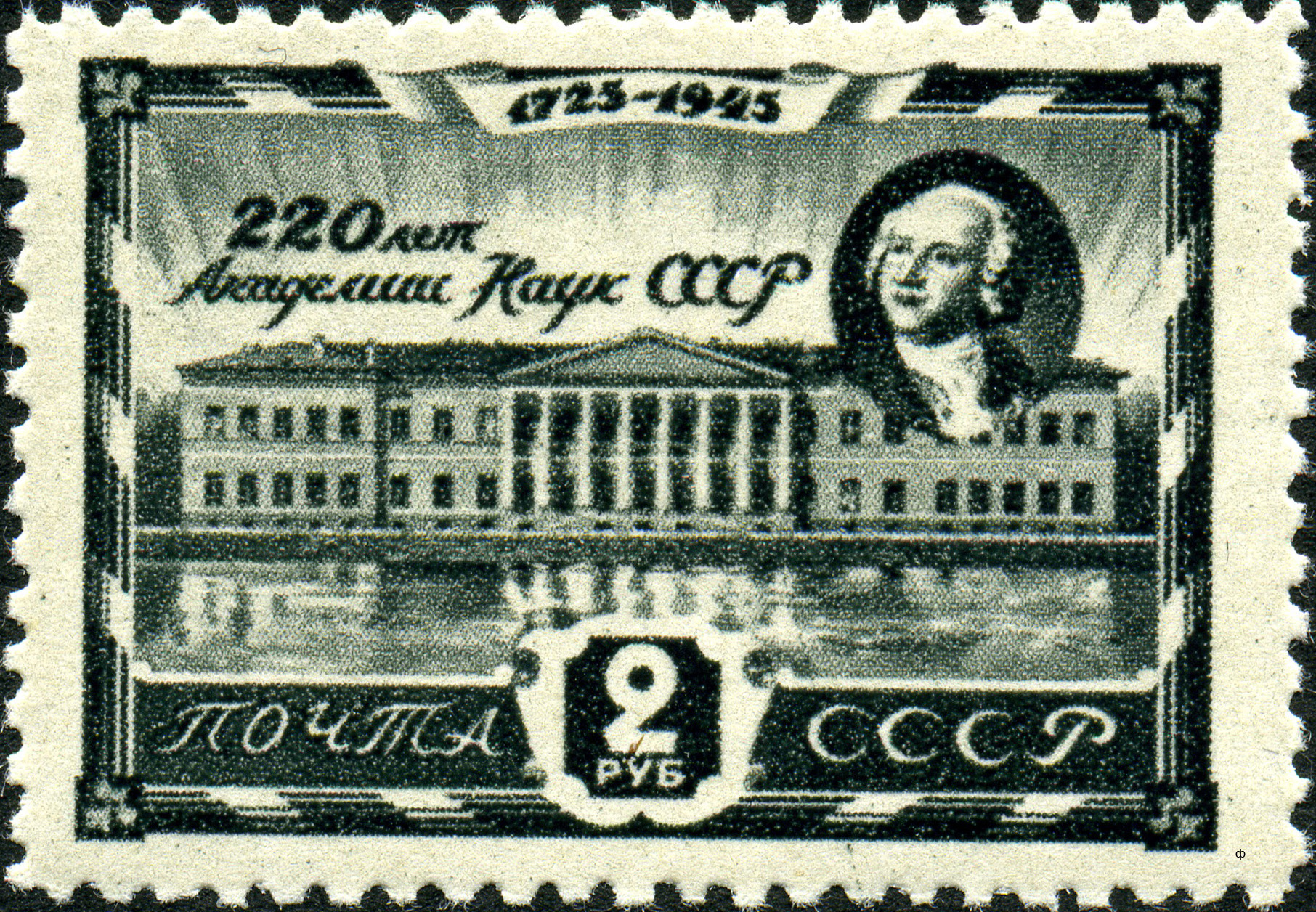
3 ruble postage stamp of the Soviet Union, 1945: 220 years of the Academy of Sciences of the Soviet Union

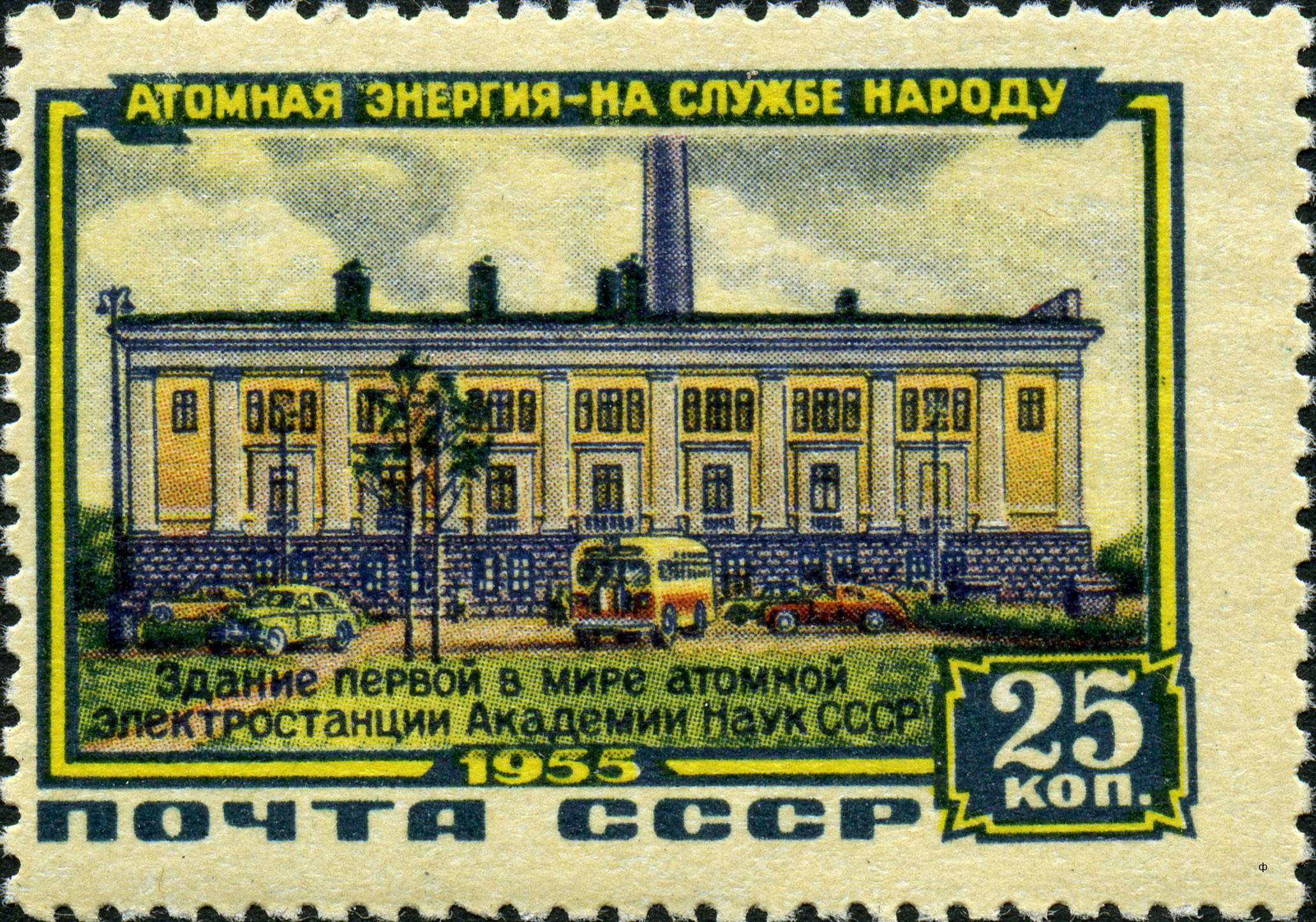
25 kopeck postage stamp of the Soviet Union, 1955: building of the world's first-ever nuclear power plant of the Academy of Sciences of the Soviet Union

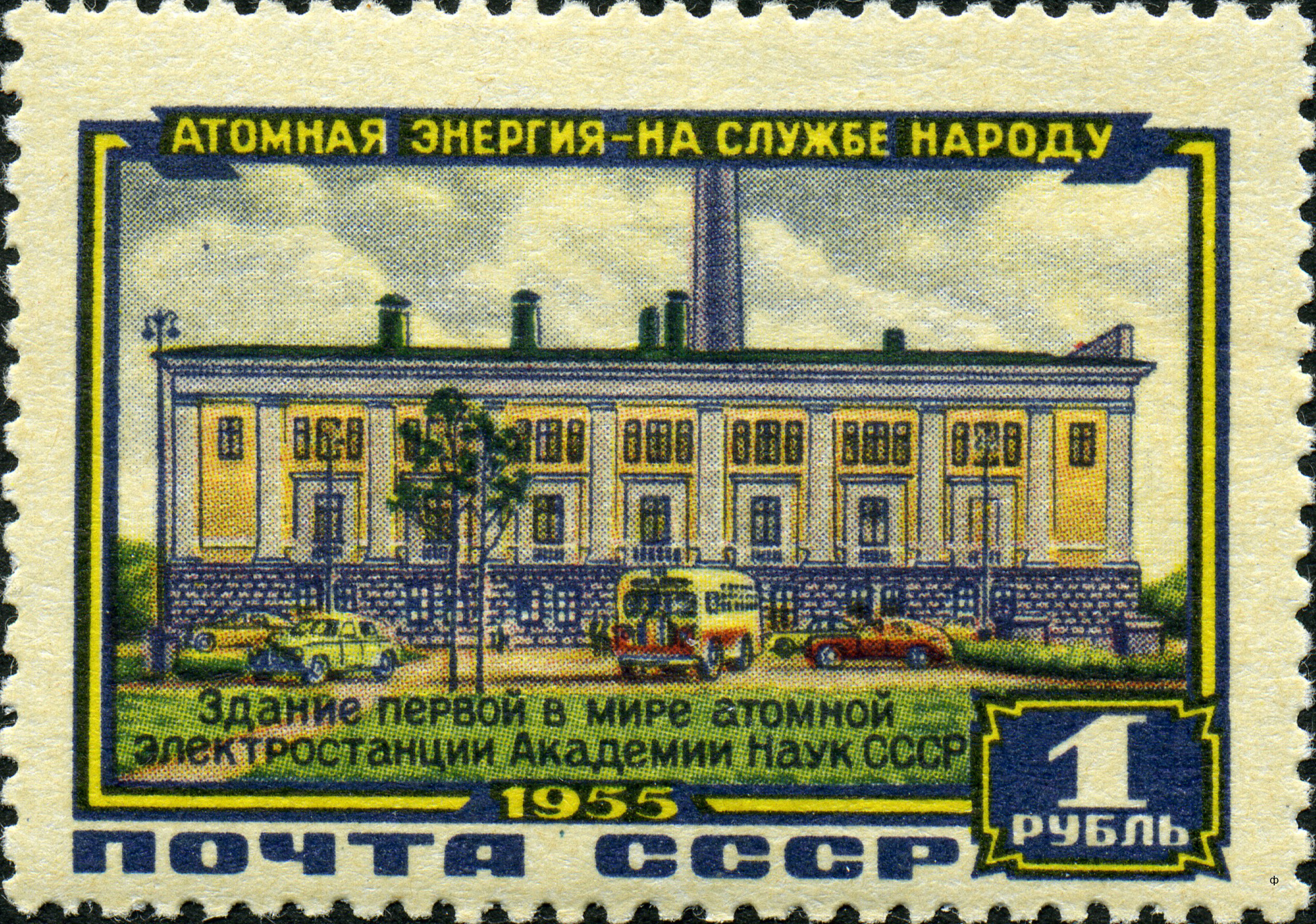
1 ruble postage stamp of the Soviet Union, 1955: building of the world's first-ever nuclear power plant of the Academy of Sciences of the Soviet Union

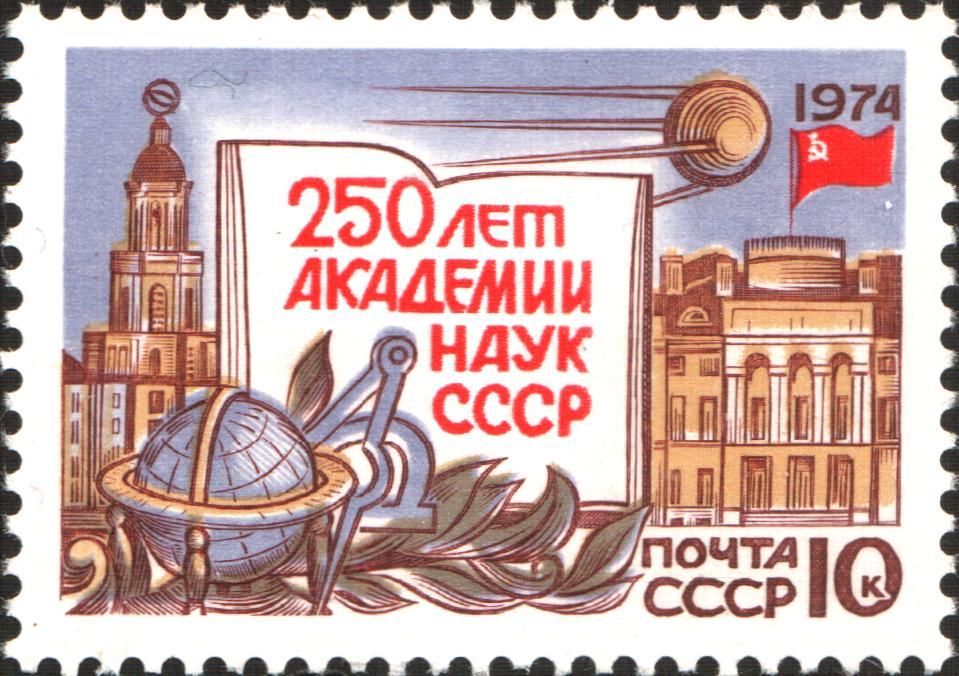
3 kopeck postage stamp of the Soviet Union, 1974: 250 years of the Academy of Sciences of the Soviet Union

== See also ==
- USSR Academy of Medical Sciences
- Lenin All-Union Academy of Agricultural Sciences
- USSR Academy of Sciences Publishing House
- Russian Academy of Sciences

== Sources ==
- Documents on the history of the Academy of Sciences of the Soviet Union: 1917–1925. / Compiled by Tryaskina. – Leningrad: Nauka, 1986.
- Autographs of scientists at the Archives of the Academy of Sciences of the Soviet Union – Leningrad: Science, 1978.
- The Academy of Sciences in the decisions of the Politburo of the Central Committee of the Russian Communist Party (Bolsheviks) – the All-Union Communist Party (Bolsheviks) – the Communist Party of the Soviet Union. – Moscow, 2000.
- Anatoly Koltsov. Development of the Academy of Sciences as the highest scientific institution of the Soviet Union. 1926–1932. – Leningrad: Science, 1982.
- Gennady Komkov, Boris Levshin, Lev Semenov. Academy of Sciences of the Soviet Union: A brief historical essay. – Moscow: Science, 1974.
- Anna Lahno. Functions of the indispensable secretary of the Academy of Sciences of the Soviet Union: On the example of the activities of Academician Vyacheslav Volgin // Public administration. Electronic messenger. – 2009. – No. 21. – ISSSN 2070–1381.
- Materials on the history of the Academy of Sciences of the Soviet Union during the Soviet period: 1917–1947. – Moscow, 1950.
- International scientific relations of the Academy of Sciences of the Soviet Union. 1917–1941 / Compiled by Pantsyrev. – Moscow: Science, 1992.
- 220 years of the Academy of Sciences of the USSR. Reference book. – Moscow – Leningrad, 1945.
- Zinaida Sokolovskaya, Alexander Yanshin. History of the Academy of Sciences of Russia in the books of the series of the Russian Academy of Sciences "Scientific and biographical literature" // Questions of the history of science and technology. – 1999. – No. 3.
- The tragic fate: repressed scientists of the Academy of Sciences of the Soviet Union. – Moscow, 1995.
- Vyacheslav Tyutyunnik, Tatiana Fedotova. Gold medals and nominal awards of the Academy of Sciences of the Soviet Union: bibliography. – Tambov, 1988.
- Charters of the Russian Academy of Sciences. 1724–1999. – Moscow, 1999.
