= List of historians =

This is a list of historians, but only for those with a biographical entry in Wikipedia. Major chroniclers and annalists are included and names are listed by the person's historical period. The entries continue with the specializations, not nationality.

== Antiquity ==
=== Greco-Roman world ===
==== Classical period ====
- Herodotus (484 – c. 420 BCE), Halicarnassus, wrote the Histories, which established Western historiography
- Thucydides (460 – c. 400 BCE), Peloponnesian War
- Xenophon (431 – c. 360 BCE), Athenian knight and student of Socrates
- Ctesias (early 4th century BCE), Greek historian of Assyrian, Persian, and Indian history

==== Hellenistic period ====
- Ephorus of Cyme (c. 400–330 BCE), Greek history
- Theopompus (c. 380 – c. 315 BCE), Greek history
- Eudemus of Rhodes (c. 370 – c. 300 BCE), Greek historian of science
- Ptolemy I Soter (367 – c. 283 BCE), general of Alexander the Great, founder of the Ptolemaic dynasty
- Duris of Samos (c. 350 – post-281 BCE), Greek history
- Berossus (early 3rd century BCE), Babylonian historian
- Timaeus of Tauromenium (c. 345 BCE – c. 250 BCE), Greek history
- Manetho (3rd century BCE), Egyptian historian and priest from Sebennytos (ancient Egyptian: Tjebnutjer) living in the Ptolemaic era
- Quintus Fabius Pictor (born c. 254 BCE), Roman history
- Artapanus of Alexandria (late 3rd – early 2nd centuries BCE), Jewish historian of Ptolemaic Egypt
- Cato the Elder (234–149 BCE), Roman statesman and historian, author of the Origines
- Cincius Alimentus (late 2nd century BCE), Roman history
- Eupolemus, Hellenistic Jewish historian
- Gaius Acilius (fl. 155 BCE), Roman history
- Agatharchides (fl. mid–2nd century BCE), Greek history
- Polybius (203 – c. 120 BCE), early Roman history (in Greek)
- Sempronius Asellio (c. 158 – post-91 BCE), early Roman history
- Valerius Antias (1st century BCE), Roman history
- Quintus Claudius Quadrigarius (1st century BCE), Roman history
- Diodorus of Sicily (1st century BCE), Greek history
- Posidonius (c. 135 – 51 BCE), Greek and Roman history
- Theophanes of Mytilene (fl. mid 1st-century BCE), Roman history

==== Roman Empire ====
- Julius Caesar (100 – c. 44 BCE), Gallic and civil wars
- Sallust (86–34 BCE), Roman history
- Dionysius of Halicarnassus (c. 60 – post-7 BCE), Roman history
- Livy (64 BCE – 12 CE), Roman history
- Memnon of Heraclea (fl. 1st century CE), Greek and Roman history
- Strabo (63 BCE – 24 CE), geography, Greek history
- Marcus Velleius Paterculus (c. 19 BCE – c. 31 CE), Roman history
- Claudius (10 BCE – 54 CE), Roman, Etruscan and Carthaginian history
- Pamphile of Epidaurus (female historian active under Nero, r. 54–68), Greek history
- Marcus Cluvius Rufus, (fl. 41–69), Roman history
- Quintus Curtius Rufus (c. 60–70), Greek history
- Flavius Josephus (37–100), Jewish history
- Dio Chrysostom (c. 40 – c. 115 CE), history of the Getae
- Thallus (early-2nd-century CE), Roman history
- Gaius Cornelius Tacitus (c. 56–120), early Roman Empire
- Plutarch (c. 45 – 125), Parallel Lives of important Greeks and Romans
- Criton of Heraclea (fl. 100), history of the Getae and the Dacian Wars
- Suetonius (c. 69 – post-122), Roman emperors up to the Flavian dynasty
- Appian (c. 95 – c. 165), Roman history
- Arrian (c. 92–175), Greek history
- Granius Licinianus (2nd century), Roman history
- Criton of Pieria (2nd century), Greek history
- Lucius Ampelius (c. 2nd-century CE), Roman history
- Dio Cassius (c. 160 – after 229), Roman history
- Marius Maximus (c. 160 – c. 230), biography of Roman emperors
- Diogenes Laërtius (fl. c. 230), history of Greek philosophers
- Sextus Julius Africanus (c. 160 – c. 240), early Christian
- Herodian (c. 170 – c. 240), Roman history
- Publius Anteius Antiochus (early 3rd c.)
- Gaius Asinius Quadratus (fl. 248), Roman history
- Dexippus (c. 210 – 273), Roman history
- Ephorus the Younger (late 3rd century), Roman history
- Acholius (late 3rd century), Roman history
- Callinicus (died 273), history of Alexandria
- Eusebius of Caesarea (c. 275 – c. 339), early Christian
- Praxagoras of Athens (fl. early 4th century), Greek and Roman history
- Festus (fl. 370), Roman history
- Aurelius Victor (c. 320 – c. 390), Roman history
- Eutropius (died 390), Roman history
- Ammianus Marcellinus (c. 325 – c. 391), Roman history
- Virius Nicomachus Flavianus (334–394), Roman history
- Sulpicius Alexander (fl. late 4th century), Roman history
- Rufinus of Aquileia (c. 340–410), early Christian
- Eunapius (346–414), biographies of philosophers and universal history
- Orosius (c. 375 – post-418), early Christian
- Philostorgius (368 – c. 439), early Christian
- Socrates of Constantinople (c. 380 – unknown date), early Christian
- Agathangelos (5th century), Armenian history
- Priscus (5th century), Byzantine history
- Sozomen (c. 400 – c. 450), early Christian
- Theodoret (c. 393 – c. 457), early Christian
- Movses Khorenatsi (13 January 410–488), Armenian history
- Hydatius (c. 400 – c. 469), chronicler of Hispania
- Salvian (c. 400/405 – c. 493), early Christian
- Faustus of Byzantium (5th century), Armenian history
- Ghazar Parpetsi (441– after 515), Armenian history
- Zosimus (fl. 491–518), late Roman history
- Jordanes (6th century), history of the Goths
- John Malalas (c. 491–578), Early Christian

=== China ===
- Zuo Qiuming (左丘明, 556–451 BCE), attributed author of the Zuo Zhuan, a history of Spring and Autumn period
- Sima Tan (司馬談, 165–110 BCE), began the Records of the Grand Historian, completed by his son Sima Qian
- Sima Qian (司馬遷, c. 145 – c. 86 BCE), customary father of Chinese historiography, compiled the Records of the Grand Historian
- Liu Xiang (劉向, 77–76 BCE) (Han dynasty), organized the Han imperial library
- Ban Biao (班彪, CE 3–54) (Han dynasty), began the Book of Han, completed by his son and daughter
- Ban Gu (班固, CE 32–92) (Han dynasty), compiled the Book of Han, completed by his sister Ban Zhao
- Ban Zhao (班昭, CE 45–116) (Han dynasty, China's first female historian, completed the Book of Han
- Chen Shou (陈寿, 233–297) (Jin dynasty) compiled the Records of the Three Kingdoms
- Faxian (法顯, c. 337 – c. 422), Chinese Buddhist monk and traveler, wrote an important memoir of his travels to India
- Fan Ye (范曄, 398–445), compiled the Book of Later Han
- Shen Yue (沈約, 441–513), wrote the Book of Song on the Liu Song dynasty (420–479)

== Middle Ages ==
=== Byzantine sphere ===
- Procopius (c. 500 – c. 565), writings on reigns of Justinian and Theodora
- Constantine of Preslav (late 9th – early 10th c.), Bulgarian historian
- Nestor the Chronicler (c. 1056 – c. 1114, in Kiev), author of the Primary Chronicle
- Anna Komnene (1083–1153), Byzantine princess
- Joannes Zonaras (12th c.), Byzantine chronicler
- Nicetas Choniates (died c. 1220)
- Domentijan (1210–1264), Serbian monk and chronicler

=== Latin sphere ===
==== Early Middle Ages ====
- Gildas (500–570), On the Ruin of Briain
- Gregory of Tours (538–594), A History of the Franks
- Baudonivia (fl. c. 600), Frankish nun who wrote a biography of Radegund
- Cogitosus (fl. c. 650), Irish historian
- Tírechán (fl. c. 655), Irish biographer of Saint Patrick
- Muirchu moccu Machtheni (7th c.), Irish historian
- Adamnan (625–704), Irish historian
- Bede (c. 672–735), Anglo-Saxon England
- Paul the Deacon (8th c.), Langobards
- Einhard (9th c.), biographer of Charlemagne
- Nennius (c. 9th c.), Wales
- Notker of St Gall (9th c.), anecdotal biography of champagne
- Martianus Hiberniensis (819–875), Irish teacher and historian
- Asser, Bishop of Sherborne (died 908/909), Welsh historian
- Regino of Prüm (died 915)

==== 10th century ====
- Widukind of Corvey (925–973), Ottonian chronicler
- Liutprand of Cremona (922–972), Byzantine affairs
- Heriger of Lobbes (925–1007), theologian and historian
- Richerus (fl. 10th century), French monk and historian
- Hrostvitha of Gandersheim (935–978), Saxon canoness, poet and historian

==== 11th century ====
- Ahimaaz ben Paltiel (1017–1060) – known as the compiler of the Chronicle of 1054, a chronicle of Jewish Byzantine Italy
- Thietmar of Merseburg (975–1018), German, Polish, and Russian affairs
- Michael Psellus (1018 – c. 1078), Greek politician and historian
- Marianus Scotus (1028–1082/1083), Irish chronicler
- Michael Attaleiates (c. 1015 – c. 1080), Byzantine historian
- Guibert of Nogent (1053–1124), Benedictine historian
- Eadmer (c. 1066 – c. 1124), post-Conquest English history
- Adam of Bremen (later 11th century), historian of Scandinavia, Gesta Hammaburgensis Ecclesiae Pontificum

==== 12th century ====
- Abraham ibn Daud (1110–1180), Sephardic Jewish author of Sefer ha-Qabbalah
- Albert of Aix (fl. c. 1100), historian of the First Crusade
- Alured of Beverley (fl. 1143), English chronicler
- Ambroise (fl. 1190s), Anglo-Norman writer of verse narrative of the Third Crusade
- Anna Komnene (Anna Comnena, 1083 – post-1148), Byzantine princess and historian
- Bele Regis Notarius(late 12th century – early 13th century), Hungarian chronicler. Gesta Hungarorum.
- Eliezer ben Nathan (1090–1170), Jewish chronicler of the Rhineland massacres from Mainz
- Ephraim of Bonn (1132–1200 or 1221), Jewish chronicler
- Florence of Worcester (died 1118), English chronicler
- Galbert of Bruges (12th century), Flemish chronicler
- Gallus Anonymus (fl. 11th – 12th centuries), Polish historian
- Geoffrey Gaimar (fl. 1130s), Anglo-Norman chronicler
- Geoffrey of Monmouth (c. 1100 – c. 1155), churchman/historian
- Geoffroi de Villehardouin (c. 1160–1212)
- Helmold of Bosau (ca. 1120 – post-1177), German chronicler
- John of Worcester (fl. 1150s), English chronicler
- Otto of Freising (c. 1114–1158), German chronicler
- Pelagius of Oviedo (died 1153), Iberian bishop/historian
- Saxo Grammaticus (12th century), Danish chronicler
- Solomon bar Simson (1140), Jewish chronicler of the Crusades in Mainz
- Svend Aagesen (c. 1140/1150 – unknown date), Danish historian
- Symeon of Durham (died post-1129), English chronicler
- William of Malmesbury (1095–1143), English historian
- William of Newburgh (1135–1198), English historian known as "the father of historical criticism"
- William of Tyre (c. 1128–1186)

==== 13th century ====
- Giraldus Cambrensis (c. 1146 – c. 1223)
- Wincenty Kadlubek (1161–1223), Polish historian
- Adam of Eynsham (died c. 1233), English hagiographer and writer, abbot of Eynsham Abbey
- Snorri Sturluson (c. 1178–1241), Icelandic historian
- Matthew Paris (died 1259), English chronicler and illuminator
- Jans der Enikel (c. 1227 – c. 1290), Viennese historian and poet
- Templar of Tyre (c. 1230–1314), end of the Crusades
- Simon of Kéza. End of 13th century. A Hungarian chronicler. (c. 1282–1285: Gesta Hunnorum et Hungarorum)

==== Late Middle Ages ====
Historians of the Italian Renaissance listed under "Renaissance"

- Piers Langtoft (died c. 1307)
- Jean de Joinville (1224–1319)
- Giovanni Villani (1276–1348), Italian chronicler from Florence who wrote the Nuova Cronica
- John of Küküllő (1320–1393)
- John Clyn (fl. 1333–1349), Irish historian
- Seán Mór Ó Dubhagáin (died 1372), Irish historian
- Adhamh Ó Cianáin (died 1373)
- John of Fordun (died 1384), Scottish chronicler
- Ruaidhri Ó Cianáin (died 1387), Irish historian
- Jean Froissart (c. 1337 – c. 1405), chronicler
- Dietrich of Nieheim (c. 1345–1418), ecclesiastical history
- Christine de Pizan (c. 1365 – c. 1430), historian, poet and philosopher
- Álvar García de Santa María (1370–1460)
- Giolla Íosa Mór Mac Fhirbhisigh (fl. 1390–1418)
- John Capgrave (1393–1464)
- Alfonso de Cartagena (1396–1456)
- Enguerrand de Monstrelet (c. 1400–1453), French chronicler
- Georges Chastellain (c. 1405 or 1415–1475), Burgundian chronicler
- Thomas Basin (1412–1491), French historian
- Jan Długosz (1415–1480), Polish historian and chronicler
- Mathieu d'Escouchy (1420–1482), French chronicler
- Olivier de la Marche (1425–1502), Burgundian chronicler
- Antonio Bonfini(1424–1502), Italian chronicler
- Johannes de Thurocz (1435–1489), Hungarian chronicler
- Jean Molinet (1435–1507), French chronicler
- Cathal Óg Mac Maghnusa (1439–1498), compiler and annalist
- Philippe de Commines (1447–1511)

=== Islamic world ===
- Ibn Rustah (10th century), Persian historian and traveler
- Abu'l-Fadl Bayhaqi (995–1077), Persian historian and author
- Muhammad ibn Jarir al-Tabari (838–923), Persian historian
- Al-Biruni (973–1048), Persian historian
- Ibn Hayyan (987–1075), Arab historian
- Ibn Hazm (994–1064), Arab historian
- Al-Udri (born 1003), Arab historian
- Mohammed al-Baydhaq (fl. 1150), Moroccan historian
- Usamah ibn Munqidh (1095–1188), Arab historian
- Ali ibn al-Athir (1160–1233), Arab historian
- Abdelwahid al-Marrakushi (born 1185), Moroccan historian
- Ibn al-Khabbaza (died 1239), Moroccan historian
- Ata al-Mulk Juvayni (1226–1283), Persian historian
- Abdelaziz al-Malzuzi (died 1298), Moroccan historian
- Ibn Kathir (1300–1373), Arab historian and Scholar
- Ibn Abi Zar (fl. 1315), Moroccan historian
- Ibn Idhari (late 13th/early 14th c.), Moroccan Arab historian
- Rashid-al-Din Hamadani (1247–1317), Persian historian
- Abdullah Wassaf (1299–1323), Persian historian
- Ibn Khaldun (1332–1406), Arab historian
- Ismail ibn al-Ahmar (1387–1406), Arab historian

=== East Asia ===
- Fang Xuanling (房玄齡, 579–648, Chinese Tang dynasty) compiled the Book of Jin.
- Yao Silian (姚思廉, died 637, Chinese Tang dynasty) compiled the Book of Liang and Book of Chen.
- Wei Zheng (魏徵, 580–643), Chinese historian and lead editor of the Book of Sui
- Liu Zhiji (劉知幾, 661–721), Chinese history, author of Shitong, the first Chinese work on Chinese historiography and methods
- Ō no Yasumaro (太安万侶, died 723), Japanese chronicler and editor of Kojiki and Nihon Shoki
- Liu Xu (劉昫,888–947), Chinese historian and lead editor of Old Book of Tang
- Li Fang (李昉, 925–996), Chinese editor of Four Great Books of Song
- Song Qi (宋祁, 998–1061), Chinese historian and co-author of New Book of Tang
- Ouyang Xiu (歐陽脩, 1007–1072), Chinese historian and co-author of New Book of Tang
- Sima Guang (司馬光, 1019–1086), Chinese historiographer and politician
- Kim Pusik (김부식, 1075–1151), Korean historian, author of Samguk Sagi
- Li Xinchuan (李心傳, 1167–1244), Chinese historian of the Southern Song
- Il-yeon (일연, 1206–1289), Korean historian, author of Samguk Yusa
- Lê Văn Hưu (黎文休, 1230–1322), Vietnamese history
- Toqto'a (脫脫, 1314–1356) (Chinese Yuan dynasty), Mongol historian who compiled History of Song
- Song Lian (宋濂, 1310–1381) (Chinese Ming dynasty), wrote History of Yuan
- Zhu Quan (朱權, 1378–1448), Chinese history

=== India ===
- Kalhana (c. 12th century), historian of Kashmir and Indian Subcontinent
- Hemachandra (12th century), Jain polymath
- Abdul Malik Isami (14th century), Indian historian and poet
- Jonaraja (15th century) Kashmiri historian and Sanskrit poet
- Padmanābha (15th century), Indian poet and historian
- Yahya bin Ahmad Sirhindi (15th century), Delhi Sultanate

== Renaissance to early modern ==
=== Renaissance Europe ===
Western historians during the Italian Renaissance or Northern Renaissance; those born post-1600 listed under "early modern"

- Leonardo Bruni (1370–1444), humanist historian
- Flavio Biondo (1392–1463), humanist historian
- Philippe de Commines (1447–1511), French historian
- Robert Fabyan (died 1513), London alderman and chronicler
- Niccolò Machiavelli (1469–1527), author of Florentine Histories
- Hector Boece (1465–1536), Scottish philosopher and historian, author of Historia Gentis Scotorum
- Albert Krantz (1450–1517), German historian
- Polydore Vergil (c. 1470–1555), Tudor history
- Stephanus Brodericus (1480–1539), Croatian Hungarian bishop. Stephani Broderici narratio de praelio quo ad Mohatzium anno 1526 Ludovicus Hungariae rex periit(De conflictu Hungarorum cum Turcis ad Mohacz verissima historia)
- Francesco Guicciardini (1483–1540), historian of the Italian Wars, "Storia d'Italia"
- Paolo Giovio (1486–1552), historian of the Italian Wars and the Renaissance Papacy, Historiae
- Paolo Sarpi (1552–1623), historian of the Council of Trent
- Olaus Magnus (c. 1490–1570), Swedish ecclesiastic
- Kaspar Helth (1490–1574), Transylvanian Saxon historian and Protestant preacher.
- Nicolaus Olahus (1493–1568), Hungarian/Wallachian chronicler. H
- João de Barros (1496–1570), Portuguese historian
- Aegidius Tschudi (1505–1572), Swiss historian
- Oliver Mathews (c. 1520–c. 1618), Welsh chronicler
- Josias Simmler (1530–1576), Swiss classicist
- Ferenc Forgách (bishop of Várad) (1530–1577), Hungarian historian
- Arild Huitfeldt (1546–1609), Denmark
- Raphael Holinshed (died c. 1580), chronicler, source for Shakespeare plays
- Caesar Baronius (1538–1607), ecclesiastical historian
- Sigismund von Herberstein (1486–1566), Muscovite affairs
- Miklós Istvánffy (1538–1615) Hungarian historian
- Paolo Paruta (1540–1598), Venetian historian
- Garcilaso de la Vega (1539–1616), Spanish historian of Inca history
- Pilip Ballach Ó Duibhgeannáin (fl. 1579–1590). Irish historian

=== Early modern period ===
Western historians of the early modern period and the Enlightenment (also known as the Age of Enlightenment, c. 1600–1815

- John Hayward (1564–1627)
- James Ussher (1581–1656), chronology of the history of the world
- Pieter Corneliszoon Hooft (1581–1647), Dutch Republic
- William Bradford (1590–1657), Mayflower/Plymouth Colony of America
- Mícheál Ó Cléirigh (c. 1590–1643), Irish historian
- Thomas Fuller (1608–1661), English historian and churchman
- Tadhg Óg Ó Cianáin (died c. 1614), Irish historian
- Cú Choigcríche Ó Cléirigh (Peregrine O'Clery) (died c. 1662/1664), Irish historian
- Sir James Ware (1594–1666), Anglo-Irish historian and antiquarian
- Arthur Wilson (1595–1652), 16th-century Britain
- Placido Puccinelli (1609–1685), Italian historian
- Charles du Fresne, sieur du Cange (1610–1688), Medieval and Byzantine historian and philologist
- Mary Bonaventure Browne (c. 1610 – c. 1670), Poor Clare and Irish historian
- Peregrine Ó Duibhgeannain (fl. 1627–1636), Irish historian
- Ruaidhrí Ó Flaithbheartaigh (1629–1716/1718), Irish historian
- Louis-Sébastien Le Nain de Tillemont (1637–1698), ecclesiastical historian
- Christoph Cellarius (1638–1707), German universal historian
- Constantin Catntacuzino (1639–1716), Wallachian Historian
- John Strype (1643–1737), English historian
- Thomas Rymer (c. 1643–1713), English historian and antiquary
- Dubhaltach MacFhirbhisigh (fl. 1643–1671), Irish historian, annalist, genealogist
- Geoffrey Keating/Seathrún Céitinn (died 1643), Irish historian
- Đorđe Branković (1645–1711), Serbian history
- Josiah Burchett (1666–1746), British naval historian and CEmiralty official
- Anton Mariah Del Chiaro (1669-aft.1727), the author of a book on the history of Wallachia.
- Laurence Echard (c. 1670–1730), England
- Ludovico Antonio Muratori (1672–1750), Italy
- Manuel Teles da Silva, 3rd Marquis of Alegrete (1682–1736), Portuguese historian
- Matthias Bel (1684–1749), Lutheran pastor and polymath from Kingdom of Hungary
- Moses Williams (1685–1742), Welsh scholar and antiquarian
- Archibald Bower (1686–1766), historian of Rome
- Vasily Tatishchev (1686–1750), first historian of modern Russia
- Giambattista Vico (1688–1744), Italian historian, first modern philosopher of history
- Voltaire (1694–1778), writer on Europe and France
- Johann Lorenz Von Mosheim (1694–1755), Lutheran historian
- Charlotta Frölich (1698–1770), Swedish historian
- Francis Blomefield (1705–1752), historian of Norfolk, England
- David Hume (1711–1776), History of England
- Thomas Hutchinson (1711–1780), colonial Massachusetts
- Francisco Jose Freire (1719–1773), Portuguese historian and philologist
- William Robertson (1721–1793), Scottish historian
- György Pray (1723–1801), Hungarian abbot and historian
- Zaharije Orfelin (1726–1785), Austrian Serb historian
- Johann Christoph Gatterer (1727–1799), German historian
- Edward Hasted (1732–1812), English antiquarian and Kent historian
- Mikhail Shcherbatov (1733–1790), Russian historian
- August Ludwig von Schlözer (1735–1809), German historian
- John Barrow (fl. 1735–1774), English naval historian and geographer
- Edward Gibbon (1737–1794), Roman Empire and Byzantium
- Alexander Hewat (or Hewatt) (1739–1824), colonial Carolina and Georgia
- Benjamin Incledon (1730–1796), English antiquary and school historian
- Philip Yorke (1743–1804), Welsh historian and politician
- Johann Gottfried Herder (1744–1803), philosophy of the history of mankind
- Fray Íñigo Abbad y Lasierra (1745–1813), Spanish historian
- David Ramsay (1749–1815), American Revolution; South Carolina
- Johannes von Müller (1752–1809), Switzerland
- Pauline de Lézardière (1754–1835), French law historian
- Anton Tomaz Linhart (1756–1795), known for Slovenian history
- Friedrich Schiller (1759–1805), German historian
- Nikolai Mikhailovich Karamzin (1766–1826), Russian historian, Russian Empire
- György Fejér (1766–1851) Hungarian author
- Francesco Maria Appendini (1768–1837), Italian historian, Republic of Ragusa
- Ernst Moritz Arndt (1769–1860), German historian

=== Jewish ===
- Abraham Zacuto (1452–1515)
- Solomon ibn Verga (1460–1554)
- Abraham ben Solomon (b. 1482)
- Gedaliah ibn Yahya (c. 1515–1587)
- Samuel Usque (1500–after 1555)
- Joseph ha-Kohen (1496–1575)
- Elijah Capsali (1483–1555)
- David Gans (1541–1613)
- Azariah de Rossi (1513–78)
- David Conforte (c. 1618–c. 1685)
- Jehiel Heilprin (1660–1746)
- Nathan Hannover (d. 1663)
- Menahem Amelander (d. 1767)
- Abraham Braatbard (1699–1786)
- Chaim Azulai (1724–1806)
- Abraham Trebitsch (c. 1760–c. 1850)
- Salomo Löwisohn (1789–1821)

=== Middle East and Islamic Empires ===
- Abd al-Qadir Bada'uni (1540–1615), Indo-Persian historian
- Ahmad Ibn al-Qadi (1553–1616), Moroccan historian
- Abd al-Aziz al-Fishtali (1549–1621), Moroccan historian
- Bahrey (born 1593), Ethiopian monk and historian; wrote Zenahu le Galla (History of the Galla, now the Oromo)
- Abd al-Rahman al-Fasi (1631–1685), Moroccan historian
- Mohammed al-Ifrani (1670–1745), Moroccan historian
- Mohammed al-Qadiri (1712–1773), Moroccan historian
- Abu al-Qasim al-Zayyani (1734–1833), Moroccan historian and poet
- Sulayman al-Hawwat (1747–1816), Moroccan historian
- Mohammed al-Duayf (born 1752), Moroccan historian
- Abbasgulu Bakikhanov (1794–1847), history of Azerbaijan and the Middle East
- George Grote (1794–1871), classical Greece
- Teimuraz Bagrationi (1782–1846), history of Georgia and the Caucasus
- Mohammed Akensus (1797–1877), Moroccan historian
- Ahmad ibn Abi Diyaf (1804–1874), Tunisian historian

=== East Asia ===
- Qian Qianyi (銭謙益, 1582–1664, late Chinese Ming dynasty)
- Zhang Tingyu (張廷玉, 1672–1755, Chinese Qing dynasty) compiled the History of Ming.
- Qian Daxin (錢大昕, 1728–1804, Chinese Qing dynasty)
- Chang Hsüeh-ch'eng (章學誠, 1738–1801), Chinese historian, local histories and essays on historiography
- Yu Deuk-gong (유득공, 1749–1807), Korean historian

== Modern historians ==
=== Historians flourishing post-1815, born post-1770 ===
- Lucy Aikin (1781–1864), English historical writer and biographer
- Lucas Alamán (1792–1853), Mexican historian, conservative statesman and writer
- Archibald Alison (1792–1867), English historian
- Thomas Arnold (1795–1842), English historian and educator
- Thomas Carlyle (1795–1881), French Revolution, Germany
- Simonas Daukantas (1793–1864), Lithuanian
- Charles Dezobry (1798–1871), French historian and historical novelist
- John Colin Dunlop (c. 1785–1842), Scottish historian
- George Finlay (1799–1875), Greece
- Erik Gustaf Geijer (1783–1847), Swedish nationalist historian
- François Guizot (1787–1874), French historian of general French, English history
- Henry Hallam (1777–1859), Medieval European history
- Georg Wilhelm Friedrich Hegel (1770–1831), German philosopher of history
- Wilhelm von Humboldt (1767–1835), German historian and polymath
- Isaak Markus Jost (1793–1860), Jewish history
- Joachim Lelewel (1786–1861), Polish historian
- Heinrich Leo (1799–1878), Prussian historian
- John Lingard (1771–1851), England
- Louis Gabriel Michaud (1773–1858), French
- Jules Michelet (1798–1874), French
- François Mignet (1796–1884), French historian of the Revolution, Middle Ages
- Christian Molbech (1783–1857), Danish history, founder of Historisk Tidsskrift (1839)
- José María Luis Mora (1792–1853), Mexican priest, lawyer, historian, politician and liberal ideologist
- John Neal (1793–1876), US Revolutionary War and US literature
- Barthold Georg Niebuhr (1776–1831), German historian
- František Palacký (1798–1876), Czech
- William H. Prescott (1796–1859), US historian of Spain, Mexico, Peru
- Leopold von Ranke (1795–1886), European diplomacy; influential German historian
- Adolphe Thiers (1797–1877), French historian of the Revolution, Empire
- George Tucker (1775–1861), US history
- Leopold Zunz (1794–1886), Jewish history

=== Historians born in the 19th century ===
==== A ====
- Lord Acton (1834–1902), Europe
- Henry Adams (1838–1918), US 1800–1816
- Lucia H. Faxon Additon (1847–1919), Oregon
- Grace Aguilar (1816–1847), Jewish history
- Robert G. Albion (1896–1983), maritime
- Mário de Andrade (1893–1945), Brazil, history of art
- Charles McLean Andrews (1863–1943), US; US colonial history
- Marie Célestine Amélie d'Armaillé (1830–1918), France
- Alfred von Arneth (1819–1897), history of the Austrian Empire
- Mikhail Artamonov (1898–1972), founder of Khazar studies
- William Ashley (1860–1927), British economic history
- Octave Aubry (1881–1946)
- François Victor Alphonse Aulard (1849–1928), French Revolution and Napoleon I
- Zurab Avalishvili (1876–1944), history of Georgia and the Caucasus
[top]

==== B ====
- Dmytro Bahalii (1857–1932), Ukraine, Russia
- Jacques Bainville (1879–1936), France
- Meir Balaban (1877–1942), Polish-Jewish
- George Bancroft (1800–1891), U.S. to 1789
- Hubert Howe Bancroft (1832–1918), western United States
- R. Mildred Barker (1897–1990), Shakers, religion
- Salo Baron (1895–1989), Jewish history
- Harry Elmer Barnes (1889–1968), World War I; ideas
- Wilhelm Barthold (1869–1930), Muslim and Turkic studies
- Volodymyr Ivanovych Barvinok (1879–1943), Ukraine
- Charles Bean (1879–1968), Australia in World War I
- Charles A. Beard (1874–1948), US, economic interpretation, historiography
- Mary Ritter Beard (1876–1958), US, women's history
- Carl L. Becker (1873–1945), Age of Enlightenment
- Max Beer (1864–1943), imperialism
- Winthrop Pickard Bell (1884–1965), Nova Scotia
- Hilaire Belloc (1870–1953), Europe
- Walter Benjamin (1892–1940), political history, social history and philosophy of history
- Ella A. Bigelow (1849–1917), Massachusetts, U.S.
- Karl Bittel (1892–1969), Germany
- I. M. E. Blandin (1838–1912), Southern U.S.
- Ernst Bloch (1885–1977), philosophy of history, political history and social history
- Marc Bloch (1886–1944), medieval France; Annales School
- Herbert Eugene Bolton (1870–1953), Spanish–U.S. borderlands
- Vladimir Bonch-Bruyevich (1873–1955), Soviet
- Amadeo Bordiga (1889–1970), political history and social history
- Octávio Brandão (1896–1980), Brazil, economic history, social history, political history
- Erich Brandenburg (1868–1946), modern Germany
- George Williams Brown (1894–1963), Canada
- Otto Brunner (1898–1982), medieval and early-modern Austria
- Geoffrey Bruun (1899–1988), Europe
- Arthur Bryant (1888–1985), Pepys; English warfare
- James Bryce, (1838–1922), Europe, America, Middle East
- Henry Thomas Buckle (1821–1862), England, History of Civilization
- Serhii Buhoslavskyi (1888–1946), Ukraine, art history
- Nikolai Bukharin (1888–1938), Russia, political history, social history, economic history
- Edvard Bull Sr. (1881–1932), Norway
- Jacob Burckhardt (1818–1897), art history, Europe, Renaissance
- John Hill Burton (1809–1881), Scottish Jacobin history
- J. B. Bury (1861–1927), Anglo-Irish historian of the medieval Roman epoch, philologist
[top]

==== C ====
- Helen Cam (1885–1968), English medieval
- Pierre Caron (1875–1952), French revolution
- E. H. Carr (1892–1982), Soviet history, methodology
- Henri Raymond Casgrain (1831–1904), French Canada
- Antonio Cánovas del Castillo (1828–1897), Spanish historian
- David Cassel (1818–1893), Jewish studies
- Américo Castro (1885–1972), Spanish identity
- Bruce Catton (1899–1978), American Civil War
- Cesar de Bazancourt (1810–1865), Crimean War
- Nirad C. Chaudhuri (1897–1999), India
- Boris Chicherin (1828–1904), Russian historian, history of Russian law
- Zakaria Chichinadze (1854–1931), Georgian literature
- V. Gordon Childe (1892–1957), archaeology
- Hiram M. Chittenden (1858–1917), US West, fur trade
- Giorgi Chubinashvili (1885–1973), Georgian art
- Winston Churchill (1874–1965), world wars, British Empire
- Augustin Cochin (1876–1916), French Revolution
- Stephen F. Cohen (1938–2020), Russia
- R. G. Collingwood (1889–1943), philosophy of history
- James Connolly (1868–1916), Ireland, political history
- Julian Corbett (1854–1922), British naval
- Vladimir Ćorović (1885–1941), Serbia
- Avery Craven (1885–1980), US South
- Elizabeth Crawford, British and Irish women's suffrage
- Edward Shepherd Creasy (1812–1878), warfare
- Benedetto Croce (1866–1952), historiography
- Margaret Campbell Speke Cruwys (1894–1968), Devon
- John Shelton Curtiss (1899–1983), Soviet Union
[top]

==== D ====
- Felix Dahn (1834–1912), medieval
- Christopher Dawson (1889–1970), historian and interdisciplinarian
- Angie Debo (1890–1988), Native-American and Oklahoma history
- Léopold Delisle (1826–1910), French historian and librarian
- Bernard DeVoto (1897–1955), US West
- Margarita Diez-Colunje y Pombo (1838–1919), Colombia
- Edith Dobie (1887–1975), Great Britain
- William Dodd (1869–1940), US South
- David C. Douglas (1898–1982), Norman England
- Johann Gustav Droysen (1808–1884), German history
- W. E. B. Du Bois (1868–1963), Africa, African-American, slavery, political history, cultural history
- Sir George Dunbar (1878–1962), India
- Hermann Duncker (1874–1960), social history, political history
- Ariel Durant (1898–1981), Europe
- Will Durant (1885–1981), Europe
[top]

==== E ====
- Norbert Elias (1897–1990), process of civilization
- Ephraim Emerton (1851–1935), medieval Europe
- Friedrich Engels (1820–1895), historical materialism
[top]

==== F ====
- Cyril Falls (1888–1971), military, world wars
- Lucien Febvre (1878–1956), France
- Keith Feiling (1884–1977), England, conservatism
- Herbert Feis (1893–1972), World War II diplomacy, international finance
- Fernando Ortiz Fernández (1881–1969), Afro-Cuban history
- Charles Harding Firth (1857–1936), 17th-century England
- Herbert A. L. Fisher (1865–1940)
- Walter L. Fleming (1874–1932), US Reconstruction
- Vilmos Fraknói (1843–1924), Hungary, Hungarian ecclesiastical history
- Edward Augustus Freeman (1823–1892), English politics
- Egon Friedell (1878–1938), cultural history of the modern age
- James Anthony Froude (1818–1894), Tudor England
- J. F. C. Fuller (1878–1966), military
- Frantz Funck-Brentano (1862–1947), France
- John Sydenham Furnivall (1878–1960), Burma, Southeast Asia
- Numa Denis Fustel de Coulanges (1830–1889), antiquity, France
[top]

==== G ====
- François-Louis Ganshof (1895–1980), medieval history
- Samuel Rawson Gardiner (1829–1902), 17th-century England
- Alice Gardner (1854–1927), ancient history
- Luise Gerbing (1855–1927), history of Thuringia
- Pieter Geyl (1887–1966), Dutch
- Ghulam Muhammad Ghobar (1897–1978), Afghanistan
- Wilhelm von Giesebrecht (1814–1889), Germany, medieval history
- Lawrence Henry Gipson (1882–1970), British Empire before 1775
- Arthur Giry (1848–1899), diplomacy
- Gustave Glotz (1862–1935), ancient Greece
- George Peabody Gooch (1873–1968), modern diplomacy
- Herman Gorter (1864–1927), political history, classical
- Emma Graf (1865–1926), Swiss women
- Heinrich Graetz (1817–1891), Jewish history
- Antonio Gramsci (1891–1937), Italy, political history, social history, cultural history, history of philosophy
- Timofey Granovsky (1813–1855), medieval Germany
- Elizabeth Caroline Gray (1800–1887), Etruscan history
- John Richard Green (1837–1883), English
- Mary Anne Everett Green (1818–1895), English
- Arthur Griffiths (1838–1908), military history
- Ioseb Grishashvili (1889–1965), Georgian literature
- Lionel Groulx (1878–1967), Quebec
- René Grousset (1885–1952), Oriental history
- James Guillaume (1844–1916), labor history
- Guo Moruo (郭沫若) (1892–1978), China
[top]

==== H ====
- Élie Halévy (1870–1937), modern Britain
- Louis Halphen (1880–1950), Middle Ages
- Clarence H. Haring (1885–1960), Latin American history
- Mary Dormer Harris (1867–1936), medieval
- B. H. Liddell Hart (1895–1970), military
- Charles H. Haskins (1870–1937), medieval
- Henri Hauser (1866–1946), French historian, economist, geographer
- Julien Havet (1853–1893), Middle Ages
- Paul Hazard (1878–1944), modern France
- Eli Heckscher (1879–1954), Swedish economic historian
- John Donald Hicks (1890–1972), American politics
- Auguste Himly (1823–1906), French history and geography
- Otto Hintze (1861–1940), German
- Serafima Hopner (1880–1966), Soviet
- Max Horkheimer (1895–1973), social history, cultural history, political history
- Mihály Horváth (1809–1878), Hungary
- Henry Hoyle Howorth (1842–1923), British historian and geologist
- Mykhailo Hrushevsky (1866–1934), Ukrainian history
- Hu Sheng (1918–2000), Chinese
- Johan Huizinga (1872–1945), Dutch historian, author of Waning of the Middle Ages
[top]

==== I ====
- Ibn Zaydan (1873–1946), Moroccan historian
- Dmitry Ilovaisky (1832–1920), Russian history
- Marilla Baker Ingalls (1828–1902), Burmese missionary and historian
- Harold Innis (1894–1952), Canadian economic history
[top]

==== J ====
- Mohammed ibn Jaafar al-Kattani (1858–1927), Moroccan
- Muhammad Jaber Āl Safa (also spelled Jabir Al Safa) (1875–1945), history of the Levant and the Middle East
- William James (1780–1827), historian of the Royal Navy during the Napoleonic Wars
- Ivane Javakhishvili (1876–1940), Georgian historian
- Arthur Johnson (1845–1927), historian at the University of Oxford
- Carla de Jonge (1886-1972), historian of Dutch tiles and ceramics
- Ellen Jørgensen (1877–1948), Danish historian and historiographer
[top]

==== K ====
- Sargis Kakabadze (1886–1967), Georgia, Middle Ages
- Samuel Kamakau (1815–1876), Hawaiian historian
- Adrian Kashchenko (1858–1921), Ukrainian historian
- Konstantin Kavelin (1818–1885), Russian historian, history of Russian laws
- Hajime Kawakami (1879–1946), Japan, economic history, political history
- Eckart Kehr (1902–1933), Germany, social history, economic history
- Korneli Kekelidze (1879–1962), Georgian literature
- François Christophe Edmond de Kellermann (1802–1868), French political historian
- Hans Kelsen (1881–1973), legal
- Philip Moore Callow Kermode (1855–1932), Manx crosses and runic inscriptions
- Alexander William Kinglake (1809–1891), works on the Crimean War
- William Kingsford (1819–1898), Canadian
- Vasily Klyuchevsky (1841–1911), Russian history
- Vilhelm Knorin (1890–1939), political history
- David Knowles (1896–1974), English medieval
- Lilian Knowles (1870–1926), English economic historian
- Dudley Wright Knox (1877–1960), US naval historian
- Ludwig von Köchel (1800–1877), writer, botanist and music historian
- Mihail Kogălniceanu (1817–1891), Romanian
- Hans Kohn (1891–1971), European nationalism
- Nikodim Kondakov (1844–1925), Byzantine art
- Mehmet Fuat Köprülü, also known as Köprülüzade Mehmed Fuad (1890–1966), Turkish historian
- Yannis Kordatos (1891–1961), ancient, Byzantine history and modern Greece
- Myron Korduba (1876–1947), Ukraine
- Karl Korsch (1886–1961), Germany, political history
- Mykola Kostomarov (1817–1885), Russian and Ukrainian history
- Peter Kropotkin (1842–1921), economics, sociology and political history
- Godefroid Kurth (1847–1916), Belgian historian
- Otto Kuusinen (1881–1964), Finland, political history, literary history
[top]

==== L ====
- Leonard Woods Labaree (1897–1980), editor of the Benjamin Franklin papers
- Harold Lamb (1892–1962), US
- Karl Lamprecht (1856–1915), German art and economic history
- William L. Langer (1896–1977), US historian, world and diplomatic history
- Johann Martin Lappenberg (1794–1865), German medieval historian
- John Knox Laughton (1830–1915), British naval historian
- Ernest Lavisse (1842–1922), French history
- William Edward Hartpole Lecky (1838–1903), England and Ireland
- Georges Lefebvre (1874–1959), French Revolution
- Elisabeth Lemke (1849–1925) German history
- Vladimir Lenin (1870–1924), labor, political history, cultural history, philosophy of history, economic history, social history, history of philosophy
- Anna Lewis (1885–1961), southwestern US
- Liang Qichao (梁啓超, 1873–1929), Chinese and Western history and historiography
- John Edward Lloyd (1861–1947), Welshness
- Ferdinand Lot (1866–1952), Middle Ages
- John Lord (1810–1894), Middle Ages, ancient history, historical survey
- Arthur Oncken Lovejoy (1873–1962), intellectual history
- Arthur R. M. Lower (1889–1988), Canadian
- Emil Ludwig (1881–1948), Germany, modern Europe
- György Lukács (1885–1971), history of literature, art history and philosophy of history
- Nikolai Lukin (1885–1940), France, Germany, economic history
- Rosa Luxemburg (1871–1919), social history, political history
[top]

==== M ====
- Thomas Macaulay (1800–1859), British
- R. B. McCallum (1898–1973) British
- J. D. Mackie (1887–1978), Scottish
- William Archibald Mackintosh (1895–1970), Canadian economic
- Alfred Thayer Mahan (1840–1914), naval
- Frederic William Maitland (1850–1906), English legal, medieval
- Ramesh Chandra Majumdar (1888–1980), Indian history
- Edgar J. March (1897–1971) British maritime history
- Herbert Marcuse (1898–1979), social history, cultural history, political history
- José Carlos Mariátegui (1894–1930), Latin America, Peru, political history, economic history, history of philosophy
- J. A. R. Marriott (1859–1945), modern Britain and Europe
- Karl Marx (1818–1883), European society and economy
- Albert Mathiez (1874–1932), French Revolution
- Franz Mehring (1846–1919), political history, history of philosophy
- Friedrich Meinecke (1862–1954), German intellectual and cultural
- Krste Misirkov (1874–1926), Macedonian philologist, journalist, historian, folklorist and ethnographer
- Auguste Molinier (1851–1904), Middle Ages
- Theodor Mommsen (1817–1903), Roman Empire
- Alfred Morel-Fatio (1850–1924), Spain
- Samuel Eliot Morison (1887–1976), naval, American colonial
- John Lothrop Motley (1814–1877), the Netherlands
- Lewis Mumford (1895–1988), cities
[top]

==== N ====
- Lewis Bernstein Namier (1888–1960), 18th-century British and 20th-century diplomatic history
- Ahmad ibn Khalid al-Nasiri (1835–1897), Moroccan
- J. E. Neale (1890–1975), Elizabethan England
- Theodor Neubauer (1890–1945), Germany, political history
- Allan Nevins (1890–1971), US political and business; Civil War; biography
- A. P. Newton (1873–1942), British Empire
- Nikolai Nikolsky, (1877–1959), Oriental studies, religious
- Stojan Novaković (1842–1915), Serbian
[top]

==== O ====
- Charles Oman (1860–1946), 19th-century military
- Herbert L. Osgood (1855–1918), American colonial
[top]

==== P ====
- K. M. Panikkar (1895–1963), Indian historian
- Anna Pankratova (1897–1957), Soviet Union
- Anton Pannekoek (1873–1960), history of astronomy
- Cesare Paoli (1840–1902), Italian history
- Gaston Paris (1839–1903), Middle Ages
- Jane Marsh Parker (1836–1913), US history
- Francis Parkman (1823–1893), colonial North America
- Herbert Paul (1853–1935), 19th-century UK
- Henry Francis Pelham (1846–1907), Roman
- Arvīds Pelše (1899–1983), political history
- Samuel W. Pennypacker (1843–1916), Pennsylvania history
- Dexter Perkins (1889–1984), US history
- David Pietrusza (1949–), US history
- Ivy Pinchbeck (1898–1982), English women and children
- Henri Pirenne (1862–1935), Belgian and medieval European history
- Sergey Platonov (1860–1933), Russian
- Mikhail Pokrovsky (1868–1932), economics and Soviet history
- Karl Polanyi (1886–1964), economic history
- Albert Pollard (1869–1948), Tudor England
- Delia Lyman Porter (1858–1933), US history
- Datto Vaman Potdar (1890–1979), Indian historian
- Eileen Power (1889–1940), Middle Ages
- F. M. Powicke (1879–1963), English medieval
- H. F. M. Prescott (1896–1972), biographer of Mary I of England and medieval history
- Adam Próchnik (1892–1942), Poland, French Revolution, social history
[top]

==== Q ====
- Jules Quicherat (1814–1882), Middle Ages
[top]

==== R ====
- Christian Rakovsky (1873–1941), political history
- David Riazanov (1893–1974), political history and history of philosophy
- William Pember Reeves (1870–1938), New Zealand
- Pierre Renouvin (1893–1974), diplomatic historian
- Herbert Richmond (1871–1946), British naval
- James Riker (1822–1889), New York
- B. H. Roberts (1857–1933), Mormon
- James Harvey Robinson (1863–1936), European
- James Rodway (1848–1926), British Guiana
- Theodore Roosevelt (1858–1919), US west and naval history
- John Holland Rose (1855–1942), modern Europe, Britain and France
- Arthur Rosenberg (1889–1943), Imperial Germany, German Republic, political history
- Michael Rostovtzeff (1870–1952), ancient history
- Cecil Roth (1899–1970), Jewish history
- Hans Rothfels (1891–1976), modern German
- Roman Rosdolsky, (1898–1967), Eastern Europe
- M. N. Roy (1887–1954), India, political history, social history
- Isaak Illich Rubin (1886–1937), history of economics
- Sergei Rudenko (1885–1969), Ukraine, Russian archaeology
- Simon Rutar (1851–1903), Slovenian
- Ilarion Ruvarac (1832–1905), Serbian
[top]

==== S ====
- Abram L. Sachar (1899–1993), modern European history
- Govind Sakharam Sardesai (1865–1959), Indian
- Ferenc Salamon (1825–1892), Ottoman Hungary
- Richard G. Salomon (1884–1966), medieval and church
- Gaetano Salvemini (1873–1957), Italy
- Jadunath Sarkar (1870–1958), history of India
- George Sarton (1884–1956), history of science
- Gustave Schlumberger (1844–1929), French
- Otto Seeck (1850–1921), German
- John Robert Seeley (1834–1895), British Empire
- J. Salwyn Schapiro (1879–1973), fascism
- Arthur Schlesinger, Sr. (1888–1965), US social history
- Gershom Scholem (1897–1982), Jewish mysticism
- Moses Schorr (1874–1941), Polish-Jewish
- Albert Schreiner (1892–1979), Germany
- W. C. Sellar (1898–1951), co-author of 1066 and All That
- Victor Serge (1890–1947), Russia
- Ekaterina Shchepkina (1854–1938), Russia
- Andrey Shestakov, (1877–1941), Soviet history, agriculture
- Shin Chaeho (신채호, 1880–1936), Korean
- Adam Shortt (1859–1931), Canadian
- Endre Sík (1891–1978), Hungary
- Charlotte Fell Smith (1851–1937), English early modern
- Goldwin Smith (1823–1910), British and Canadian
- Justin Harvey Smith (1857–1930), Mexican–American War
- Sergey Solovyov (1820–1879), Russian historian
- Werner Sombart (1863–1941), Germany, economic history
- Oswald Spengler (1880–1936), world; The Decline of the West
- Joseph Vissarionovich Stalin (1878–1953), labor, political history, economic history
- Stanoje Stanojević (1874–1937), Serbia
- Wickham Steed (1871–1956), Eastern Europe
- Moritz Steinschneider (1816–1907), Jewish studies and Jewish history
- Frank Stenton (1880–1967), English medieval
- Doris Mary Stenton (1894–1971), English medieval
- Floyd Benjamin Streeter (1888–1956), Kansas, American West
- Dirk Jan Struik (1894–2000), history of mathematics
- William Stubbs (1825–1902), English law
- Alexander Svanidze (1886–1941), Ancient
- László Szalay (1813–1864), Hungarian historian
[top]

==== T ====
- Hippolyte Taine (1828–1893), French Revolution
- Frank Bigelow Tarbell (1853–1920), ancient art history
- Yevgeny Tarle (1874–1955), Russian historian
- Angelo Tasca (1892–1960), Italy, political history
- A. Wyatt Tilby (1880–1948), Britain, The English People Overseas
- Alexis de Tocqueville (1805–1859), France
- Zeki Velidi Togan (1890–1970), Turkic history
- Zacharias Topelius (1818–1898)
- Dona Torr (1883–1957), political history, social history, cultural history
- Thomas Frederick Tout (1855–1929), England
- Arnold J. Toynbee (1889–1975), world history, A Study of History
- Heinrich Gotthard von Treitschke (1834–1896), German historian and nationalist
- George Macaulay Trevelyan (1876–1962), British
- Leon Trotsky (1879–1940), Soviet
- Mikheil Tsereteli (1878–1965), Georgian historian
- Frederick Jackson Turner (1861–1932), US frontier
- Renáta Tyršová (1854–1937), Czech ethnography and art history
[top]

==== U ====
- Frank Underhill (1889–1971), Canadian
[top]

==== V ====
- Alfred Vagts (1892–1986), Germany, military
- Paul Vinogradoff (1854–1925), medieval England
- Vyacheslav Volgin (1879–1962), communism
[top]

==== W ====
- Annie Russell Wall (1835–1920), English historian
- Spencer Walpole (1839–1907), English historian
- Max Weber (1864–1920), social history, history of religion, economic history
- Charles Webster (1886–1961), British diplomatic history
- Curt Weibull (1886–1991), Swedish historian
- Lauritz Weibull (1873–1960), Swedish historian
- Spenser Wilkinson (1853–1937), Britain, military historian
- Mary Wilhelmine Williams (1878–1944), Latin America
- James A. Williamson (1886–1964), Britain, maritime historian and historian of exploration
- Esmé Cecil Wingfield-Stratford (1882–1971), England
- Justin Winsor (1831–1897), America, Narrative and Critical History of America
- Carl Frederick Wittke (1892–1971), US ethnics
- Ernest Llewellyn Woodward (1890–1971), British history and international relations
- Muriel Hazel Wright (1889–1975), Oklahoma, Native Americans
- George MacKinnon Wrong (1860–1948), Canadian
[top]

==== Y ====
- Yemelyan Yaroslavsky (1878–1943), Soviet Union
- Yi Byeongdo (이병도, 1896–1989), Korea
[top]

==== Z ====
- Nicolas Zafra (1892–1979), Philippines
- Mao Zedong (1893–1976), China, labor, economic history, political history, cultural history
- Johann Kaspar Zeuss (1806–1856), Celts
- Faddei Zielinski (1859–1944), ancient Greece
[top]

=== Historians born in the 20th century ===
==== A ====
- Raouf Abbas (1939–2008), Egyptian
- Irving Abella (1940–2022), Canadian
- Aberjhani (born 1957), African American, Harlem Renaissance, literary
- Ervand Abrahamian (born 1940), Iran
- Perseu Abramo (1929–1996), Brazil, social history
- David Abulafia (born 1949), Mediterranean
- Omar Acha (born 1971), Argentina
- Erwin Ackerknecht (1906–1988), cultural history, social history
- Ezequiel Adamovsky (born 1971), Argentina
- Donald Adamson (1939–2024), Britain
- Theodor Adorno (1903–1969), cultural history, social history
- Teodoro Agoncillo (1912–1985), Philippines
- Donald Akenson (born 1941), Irish
- Risto Alapuro (1944–2022), Finland
- Dean C. Allard (1933–2018), US naval
- Robert C. Allen (born 1947), British economy
- James S. Allen (1906–1986), America
- Gar Alperovitz (born 1936), America, Hiroshima
- Romano Alquati (1935–2010), Italy, labor history, political history
- Louis Althusser (1918–1990), history of philosophy, political history, philosophy of history
- Ida Altman (born 1950), America, colonial Spain and Latin America
- Mor Altshuler (born 1957), Hasidism, Kabbalism, and Jewish messianism
- Abbas Amanat (born 1947) Iran, America
- Stephen Ambrose (1936–2002), World War II, U.S. political
- Mahdi Amel (1936–1987), Lebanon
- Samir Amin (1931–2018), history of economics, political history, social history
- Yoshihiko Amino (1928–2004), Japan
- Henri Amouroux (1920–2007), French, Nazi occupation of France
- Atholl Anderson (born 1943), New Zealand
- Benedict Anderson (1936–2015), Southeast Asia, intellectual and political history
- Perry Anderson (born 1938), British and European
- Pavao Anđelić (1920–1985) Bosnian and Yugoslav archaeologist and historian
- Joyce Appleby (1929–2016), U.S. early national
- Herbert Aptheker (1915–2003), African-American
- Leonie Archer (born 1955), England
- Giulio Carlo Argan (1909–1992), Italian art
- Philippe Ariès (1914–1984), French medieval, childhood
- Karen Armstrong (born 1944), British religious
- Andrea Aromatico (born 1966), Italian esotericism and Hermetic iconography
- Leonard J. Arrington (1917–1999), America, Mormons
- Thomas Asbridge (born 1969), Crusades
- Maurice Ashley (1907–1994), 17th-century England
- Steven Attewell (1984–2024), public policy in 20th-century America
- Paul Avrich (1931–2006), Russian, the Anarchist movement
- Gerald Aylmer (1926–2000), 17th-century England
- Ali Azaykou (1942–2004), Moroccan
- Eiichiro Azuma (born 1966), US, Japan
[top]

==== B ====
- Alain Badiou (born 1937), history of philosophy
- Nigel Bagnall (1927–2002), Ancient Rome, Greece
- Bernard Bailyn (1922–2020), early America; Atlantic
- Étienne Balibar (born 1942), Political history, social history
- Ranuccio Bianchi Bandinelli (1900–1975), archaeology and art history
- Sergio Bagú (1911–2002), Argentina, economic history
- David E. Barclay (born 1948), German
- Juliet Barker (born 1958), late Middle Ages, literary biography
- Frank Barlow (1911–2009), medieval biography
- Linda Diane Barnes (living), US
- Geoffrey Barraclough (1908–1984), Germany, world
- G.W.S. Barrow (1924–2013), Scotland
- Walter Bartel (1904–1992), German political history
- H. Arnold Barton (1929–2016), Scandinavia
- Paul R. Bartrop (born 1955), Holocaust, genocide
- Jacques Barzun (1907–2012), cultural
- Jorge Basadre (1903–1980), Peru
- Leôncio Basbaum (1907–1969), Brazil
- Hanna Batatu (1926–2000), Palestinian, modern Iraq
- Jean Baudrillard (1929–2007), France, political history, economic history
- K. Jack Bauer (1926–1987), U.S. naval, military, and maritime
- Roland Bauer (1928–2017), Germany, political history
- Yehuda Bauer (1926–2024), Holocaust
- Angelica Bäumer (1932–2025), Art
- Stephen B. Baxter (1929–2020), late 17th – early 18th-century English
- David Bebbington (born 1949), Evangelicalism
- Antony Beevor (born 1946), World War II
- David Bell (living), Early Modern France, cultural history
- James Belich (born 1956), New Zealand
- Esther Benbassa (born 1950), Jewish history
- Abdelmajid Benjelloun (born 1944), Morocco
- Laurence Bergreen (born 1950), biography
- Isaiah Berlin (1909–1997), ideas
- Rowland Berthoff (1921–2001), American culture
- Giuseppe Berti (1901–1979), Italy, political history
- Michael Beschloss (born 1955), Cold War
- Juliette Bessis, (1925–2017), Tunisia
- Nicholas Bethell (1938–2007), Soviet
- Charles Bettelheim (1913–2006), political history, economic history
- Robert Bickers (born 1964), modern China and colonialism
- Judith Binney (1940–2011), New Zealand
- Anthony Birley (1937–2020), Ancient Rome
- Yael Bitrán (born 1965), musicology
- David Blackbourn (born 1949), German
- Robin Blackburn (born 1940), social history
- Geoffrey Blainey (born 1930), Australian
- Lesley Blanch (1904–2007), English
- Gisela Bock (born 1942), German feminist
- Sandra Boehringer (born 1972), Gender and sexuality
- Brian Bond (1936–2025), British military
- Chrystelle Trump Bond (1938–2020), US dance historian
- Robert Bonfil (born 1937), Jewish history
- Daniel J. Boorstin (1914–2004), US
- Pierre Bordieu (1930-2002), France, social history, cultural history
- Georges Bordonove (1920–2007), France
- Alfredo Bosi (1936–2021), Brazilian literature
- John Boswell (1947–1994), medievalist
- Robert Bothwell (born 1944), Canada
- Gérard Bouchard (born 1943), Canada
- Fay Bound Alberti (born 1971), histories of medicine, emotions, the body
- Joanna Bourke (born 1963), military
- Steven Bowman, Jewish history
- Paul S. Boyer (1935–2012), US morality
- Karl Dietrich Bracher (1922–2016), modern German
- Jim Bradbury (1937–2023), Middle Ages
- James C. Bradford (born 1944), US naval
- David Brading (1936–2024), Mexican history
- William Brandon (1914–2002), American West
- Ray Brassier (born 1965), philosophical history
- Fernand Braudel (1902–1985), world, Mediterranean
- Ahron Bregman (born 1958), Arab-Israeli conflict
- Michael Brenner (born 1964), Jewish history
- Robert Brenner (born 1943), US history, economic history, agriculture
- Bridget Brereton (born 1946), Trinidad and Tobago
- Holly Brewer (born 1964), early American history
- Carl Bridenbaugh (1903–1992), American colonial
- Asa Briggs (1921–2016), British social history
- Alan Brinkley (1949–2019), American 1930s
- David Brody (born 1930), American labor
- Timothy Brook (born 1951), China
- Martin Broszat (1926–1989), Nazi Germany
- Pierre Broué (1926–2005), Trotskyism
- Gregory S. Brown (born 1968), early-modern French history, cultural history
- Peter Brown (born 1935), medieval
- Christopher Browning (born 1944), Holocaust
- Aleks Buda (1910–1993), Albania
- Nikolai Bugay (born 1941), Soviet Union
- Sérgio Buarque de Holanda (1902–1982), Brazil
- Alan Bullock (1914–2004), 1940s, Hitler studies
- Colin Bundy (born 1944), South Africa
- Peter Burke (born 1937), modern period, cultural history
- Michael Burlingame (born 1941), Abraham Lincoln
- J. P. T. Bury (1908–1987), modern France
- Briton C. Busch (1936–2004), British diplomatic and US maritime
- Richard Bushman (born 1931), US colonial and Mormon
- Jon Butler (born 1940), US religion
- Herbert Butterfield (1900–1979), historiography
[top]

==== C ====
- Xiao Chua (born 1984), Filipino history
- Sima Ćirković (1929–2009) Yugoslav and Serbian historian
- Amílcar Cabral (1924–1973), Guinea-Bissau, Cape Verde, social history, political history
- Claude Cahen (1909–1991), Islamic Middle Ages, social history
- Angus Calder (1942–2008), World War II
- Alice Piffer Canabrava (1911–2003), Brazil
- Philip L. Cantelon (born 1940), US
- Andrea Carandini (born 1937), Ancient Rome
- Peter Carey (born 1948), Indonesia
- Edison Carneiro (1912–1972), Brazil, Afro-Brazilian, political history, cultural history
- Julio Caro Baroja (1914–1995), anthropologist
- Sir Raymond Carr (1919–2015), Spain and Latin America
- Richard Carrier (born 1969), ancient Rome; history of philosophy, science and religion
- Paul Cartledge (born 1947), classicist
- José Murilo de Carvalho (1939–2023), Brazil
- Lionel Casson (1914–2009), classicist
- Cornelius Castoriadis (1922–1997), social history, political history and philosophy of history
- Boris Celovsky (1923–2008), Czech-German relations
- David G. Chandler (1934–2004), British historian specializing in Napoleonic history
- Bipan Chandra (1928–2014), modern India
- Iris Chang (1968–2004), China
- Howard I. Chapelle (1901–1975), maritime
- François Châtelet, (1925–1985), philosophical history
- Maher Charif (living), Arabic intellectual history and political movements
- Yevhen Chernenko (1934–2007), Ukrainian archaeology
- Louis Chevalier (1911–2001), France
- Alexander Campbell Cheyne (1924–2006), Scotland
- Vivek Chibber (born 1965), social history, historical sociology
- Thomas Childers (born 1976), war and society, both world wars
- Satyabrata Rai Chowdhuri (1935–2016), India
- I. R. Christie (1919–1998), Britain
- Robert M. Citino (born 1958), US military historian of Europe
- Alan Clark (1928–1999), both world wars
- Christopher Clark (born 1960), Prussia
- J. C. D. Clark (born 1951), British
- Manning Clark (1915–1991), Australia
- Oliver Edmund Clubb (1901–1989), China
- Yolande Cohen (born 1950), youth, women, Moroccan Jews
- Patrick Collinson (1929–2011), Elizabethan England and Puritanism
- Ann Gorman Condon (1936–2001), Canada
- Robert Conquest (1917–2015), Russia
- Margaret Conrad (born 1946), Canada
- Martin Conway (born 1960), British scholar of European history
- John Milton Cooper (born 1940), Woodrow Wilson
- Peter Cottrell (born 1964), Anglo-Irish
- Jeremy Cowan (1923–2013), Southeast Asia
- Mario Coyula Cowley (1935–2014), Cuban architecture
- Gordon A. Craig (1913–2005), German and diplomatic
- Catherine Crary (1909–1974), American Revolution
- Donald Creighton (1902–1979), Canadian
- Vincent Cronin (1924–2011), European and art history
- William Cronon (born 1954), US environmental
- Pamela Kyle Crossley (born 1955), China
- Roger Crowley (born 1951), Mediterranean Sea; Portuguese empire
- Dan Cruickshank (born 1949), Britain, architecture
- Robert M. Crunden (1940–1999), US cultural
- Gemma Cruz (born 1943), Rizaliana, Philippines
- Álvaro Cunhal (1913–2005), Portugal, political history
- Barry Cunliffe (born 1939), archaeology
- Bruce Cumings (born 1943), East Asia, Korea
- Silvia Rivera Cusicanqui (born 1949), Bolivia
[top]

==== D ====
- Vahakn N. Dadrian (1926–2019), Armenia
- Robert Dallek (born 1934), 20th-century US presidents
- William Dalrymple (born 1965), Scottish
- David B. Danbom (born 1947), US rural
- Ahmad Hasan Dani (1920–2009), South Asia
- Robert Darnton (born 1939), 18th-century France
- Mahir Darziev (born 1957), Azerbaijan
- Saul David (born 1966), military
- John Davies (1938–2015), Wales
- Norman Davies (born 1939), Poland, Britain
- Kenneth S. Davis (1912–1999), Franklin D. Roosevelt
- Mike Davis (1946–2022), labor history, economic history
- Natalie Zemon Davis (1928–2023), early-modern France, film
- R. H. C. Davis (1918–1991), Middle Ages
- Lucy Dawidowicz (1915–1990), Holocaust
- David Day (born 1949), Australia
- Renzo De Felice (1929–1996), Italian fascism
- Guy Debord (1931–1994), cultural history, social history
- Carl N. Degler (1921–2014), US
- Len Deighton (born 1929), British military
- Gilles Deleuze (1925–1995), history of philosophy
- Esther Delisle (born 1954), French-Canadian
- Jean Delumeau (1923–2020), Catholic Church
- Jacques Derrida (1930–2004), social history, history of philosophy
- Marcel Detienne (1935–2019), ancient Greece
- Alexandre Deulofeu (1903–1978), Catalan
- Isaac Deutscher (1907–1967), Soviet
- T. M. Devine (Tom Devine) (born 1945), Scottish
- Wu Di (吴迪, born 1951), China
- Igor M. Diakonov (1914–1999), ancient Near East
- Hasia Diner (1946-), American-Jewish
- Arif Dirlik (1940–2017), China, economic history, cultural history
- Farrell Dobbs (1907–1983), Political history
- Jay P. Dolan (1936–2023), American Catholics
- David Herbert Donald (1920–2009), American Civil War
- Gordon Donaldson (1913–1993), Scotland
- Susan Doran (living), Elizabethan England
- Elisabeth Joan Doyle (1922–2009), 19th-century American and British history
- William Doyle (born 1932), French Revolution
- Hal Draper (1914–1990), political history, history of marxism
- Laurent Dubois (born 1971), Haiti
- Georges Duby (1924–1996), Middle Ages
- William S. Dudley (born 1936), US naval
- Eamon Duffy (born 1947), 15th–17th-century religious
- Hermann Walther von der Dunk (1928–2018), 20th-century Dutch and German
- Mary Maples Dunn (1931–2017), early American, women's history
- Richard Slator Dunn (1928–2022), early American, slavery
- A. Hunter Dupree (1921–2019), US science and technology
- Trevor Dupuy (1916–1995), military
- Jean-Baptiste Duroselle (1917–1994), French diplomacy
- Enrique Dussel (1934–2023), Latin America
- Harold James Dyos (1921–1978), British urban
[top]

==== E ====
- Terry Eagleton (born 1943), political history, art history, cultural history
- Robert Dudley Edwards (1909–1988), Ireland
- Carlos M. N. Eire (born 1950), history of Christianity
- Elizabeth Eisenstein (1923–2016), French Revolution, printing
- Geoff Eley (born 1949), German
- Mircea Eliade (1907–1986), history of religion
- John Elliott (1930–2022), Spanish
- Joseph J. Ellis (born 1943), early US
- David Eltis, transatlantic slave trade
- Geoffrey Elton (1921–1994), Tudor England
- Peter Englund (born 1957), Sweden
- Robert Malcolm Errington (born 1939), Britain
- Gøsta Esping-Andersen (born 1947), Denmark, social history
- Richard J. Evans (born 1947), German social
- Alf Evers (1905–2004), America
[top]

==== F ====
- Frantz Fanon (1925–1961), history of colonialism
- Esther Farbstein (born 1946), Israeli, Holocaust
- Grahame Farr (1912–1983), maritime, south-west England
- Brian Farrell (1929–2014), Ireland
- Boris Fausto (1930–2023), Brazil
- John Lister Illingworth Fennell (1918–1992), medieval Russia
- Niall Ferguson (born 1964), military, business, imperial
- Halima Ferhat (born 1941), Middle Ages of the Maghreb
- Božidar Ferjančić (1929–1998), medieval
- Florestan Fernandes (1920–1995), Brazil, social history, political history
- Robert H. Ferrell (1921–2018), US history, US presidency, World War I, US foreign policy and diplomacy, Harry S. Truman
- Marc Ferro (1924–2021), World War I
- Sérgio Ferro (born 1938), architecture
- Joachim Fest (1926–2006), Nazi Germany
- David Feuerwerker (1912–1980), Jewish
- Heinrich Fichtenau (1912–2000), medieval, diplomacy
- David Kenneth Fieldhouse (1925–2018), British Empire
- Federico Brito Figueroa (1921–2000), Venezuela
- Orlando Figes (born 1957), Russian
- Robert O. Fink (1905–1988), classical
- Norman Finkelstein (born 1953), Israel, Palestine
- Moses Finley (1912–1986), ancient, especially economic
- Edith Firth (1927–2005), early Toronto, art
- David Hackett Fischer (born 1935), American Revolution, cycles
- Fritz Fischer (1908–1999), Germany
- Frances FitzGerald (born 1940), Vietnam, history textbooks
- Sheila Fitzpatrick (born 1941), Soviet Union
- Judith Flanders (born 1959), Victorian British social
- Simha Flapan (1911–1987), Israel
- Robin Fleming (born 1950s), medieval Britain
- David Flusser (1917–2000), early Christianity and Second Temple Judaism
- Robert Fogel (1926–2013), US economic, cliometrics
- Eric Foner (born 1943), Reconstruction
- Neil Foley (born 1965), US ethnic and racial history
- Philip S. Foner (1910–1994), US history, political history, labor history
- Shelby Foote (1916–2005), American Civil War
- Amanda Foreman (born 1968), Georgian England, American Civil War, women's history
- John Belllamy Foster (born 1953), political history, history of economics
- Michel Foucault (1926–1984), ideas
- Jo Fox (living), 20th-century film and propaganda
- Robin Lane Fox (born 1946), ancient
- Elizabeth Fox-Genovese (1941–2007), US South, cultural and social, women
- Andre Gunder Frank (1929–2005), Latin America, economic history, agriculture
- Walter Frank (1905–1945), Nazi historian
- H. Bruce Franklin (1934–2024), Vietnam War
- Antonia Fraser (born 1932), England
- Frank Freidel (1916–1993), Franklin D. Roosevelt
- Olival Freire Jr. (born 1954), history of physics
- Joseph Friedenson (1922–2013), Holocaust
- Henry Friedlander (1930–2012), Holocaust
- Saul Friedländer (born 1932), Holocaust
- Sheppard Frere (1916–2015), anthropologist, Roman Empire
- David Fromkin (1932–2017), Middle East
- Francis Fukuyama (born 1955), world
- Bruno Fuligni (born 1968), French history
- Amos Funkenstein (1937–1995), Jewish history
- François Furet (1927–1997), French Revolution
[top]

==== G ====
- Femme Gaastra (born 1945), Dutch
- John Lewis Gaddis (born 1941), Cold War
- Alberto Flores Galindo (1949–1990), Peru
- Gary W. Gallagher (born 1950), American Civil War
- Lloyd Gardner (born 1934), US diplomatic
- Delphine Gardey (born 1967), gender and science
- Robert Garland (born 1947), classical history
- Edwin Gaustad (1923–2011), religion in America
- Peter Gay (1923–2015), psycho-history, Age of Enlightenment and 19th-century social
- Eugene Genovese (1930–2012), US South, slavery
- Imanuel Geiss (1931–2012), 19th/20th-century Germany
- François Géré (born 1950), military
- Christian Gerlach (born 1963), Holocaust
- N.H. Gibbs (1910–1990), military
- William Gibson (born 1959), ecclesiastical history
- Martin Gilbert (1936–2015), Holocaust
- Adolfo Gilly (1928–2023), Latin America, political history
- Carlo Ginzburg (1939–2026), social history
- Martin Glaberman (1918–2001), US society and political history
- Jan Glete (1947–2009), Swedish
- Elizaveta I. Gnevusheva (1916–1994), Dutch India
- Vitorino Magalhães Godinho (1930–2016), Portugal, social history, economic history
- Eric F. Goldman (1916–1989), 20th-century US
- Lucien Goldmann (1913–1970), Social history, history of philosophy
- James Goldrick (1958–2023), Australian
- Adrian Goldsworthy (born 1969), ancient history
- David Hamilton Golland (born 1971), 20th-century US civil rights, public policy, labor
- Guillermo Gómez (born 1936), Philippine history
- Brison D. Gooch (1925–2014), 19th-century Europe
- Ruth Goodman (born 1963), early-modern period
- Harold Eric Gough (1921–2008), history of Kent, England
- Doris Kearns Goodwin (born 1943), US presidential
- Andrew Gordon (born 1951), British naval history
- Yefim Gorodetsky (1907–1993), Soviet history
- Svetlana Gorshenina (born 1969), Central Asian history
- Kurt Gossweiler (1917–2017), economics of fascism
- Lewis L. Gould (born 1939), US presidents and first ladies
- Gerald S. Graham (1903–1988), British imperial
- Jack Granatstein (born 1939), Canada
- Michael Grant (1914–2004), ancient
- Abigail Green British historian of modern Europe
- Peter Green (1924–2024), ancient
- Vivian H.H. Green (1915–2005), Christianity
- John Robert Greene (born 1955), US presidency
- Roger D. Griffin (born 1948), fascism, political, and religious fanaticism
- Ramón Grosfoguel (born 1956), Puerto Rico, colonial history
- Boris Grushin (1929–2007), political history
- Serge Gruzinski (born 1949), Latin America
- Ramachandra Guha (born 1958), India, environment
- Ranajit Guha (1923–2023), Indian
- Lev Gumilyov (1912–1992), Soviet
- Gunnar Gunnarson (1918–2002), Sweden
- Oliver Gurney (1911–2001), Assyria, Hittites
- John Guy (born 1949), Tudor England
[top]

==== H ====
- Jürgen Habermas (1929–2026), social history
- Rebekka Habermas (1959–2023), historical anthropology
- Irfan Habib (born 1931), India
- Sheldon Hackney (1933–2013), US South
- Kenneth J. Hagan (born 1936), US naval
- John Haldon (born 1948), Byzantine Empire
- John Whitney Hall (1916–1997), Japan
- Bruce Barrymore Halpenny (1937–2015), World War II air war
- Orit Halpern, historian and cyberneticist
- Pekka Hämäläinen (born 1967), Native-American history
- N. G. L. Hammond (1907–2001), ancient Greek history
- Nahema Hanafi (born 1983), modern and contemporary history
- Victor Davis Hanson (born 1953), ancient warfare
- Syed Nomanul Haq (born 1948), history and philosophy of science
- Yuval Noah Harari (born 1976), Israeli, military, medieval
- Donna Haraway (born 1944), history of consciousness
- Mohamed Harbi (1933–2026), Algeria
- Antoinette Harrell (born 1960), post-slavery peonage of African-American sharecroppers
- Aroha Harris (born 1963), New Zealand
- Daniel Gibson Harris (1915–2007). Swedish naval
- Dick Harrison (born 1966), Swedish and medieval
- Peter Harrison (born 1955), early modern intellectual
- Edgar Hartwig (born 1928), Germany, political history
- Gerhart Hass (1931–2008), Germany
- Max Hastings (born 1945), military, World War II
- John Hattendorf (born 1941), maritime
- Ragnhild Hatton (1913–1995), 17th/18th-century European international
- Georges Haupt (1928–1978), Romania, Hungary, political history, labor history, history of literature
- Denys Hay (1915–1994), medieval and Renaissance Europe
- John Daniel Hayes (1902–1991), US naval
- Peter Hayes (born c. 1947), Holocaust
- Joel Hayward (born 1964), Islamic, maritime, military
- Ingo Heidbrink (born 1968), maritime history, history of technology
- Michael Heinrich (born 1957), philosophy
- Jean van Heijenoort (1912–1986), mathematical logic
- Klaus Hentschel (born 1961), historian of science and of visual cultures
- Ulrich Herbert (born 1951), modern Germany
- Jeffrey Herf (born 1947), Germany, Europe
- Arthur L. Herman (born 1956), America, Britain
- Michael Hicks (born 1948), late-medieval England
- Raul Hilberg (1926–2007), Holocaust
- Klaus Hildebrand (born 1941), 19th/20th-century Germany
- Christopher Hill (1912–2003), 17th-century England
- Andreas Hillgruber (1925–1989), 20th-century Germany
- Richard L. Hills (1936–2019), technology
- Rodney Hilton (1916–2002), late-medieval period
- Gertrude Himmelfarb (1922–2019), Britain
- Harry Hinsley (1918–1998), British intelligence, World War II
- Gerhard Hirschfeld (born 1946), 20th-century Germany, World War I, World War II
- Eric Hobsbawm (1917–2012), labour; Marxism
- Thomas Lionel Hodgkin (1910–1982), Africa
- Marshall Hodgson (1922–1968), Islamic
- Peter Hoffmann (1930–2023), national socialism
- Richard Hofstadter (1916–1970), US political
- Richard Hoggart (1918–2014), England, social history
- Hajo Holborn (1902–1969), Germany
- Tom Holland (born 1968), ancient Greece, Rome, Middle Ages
- C. Warren Hollister (1930–1997), Middle Ages
- George Holmes (1927–2009), medieval
- Richard Holmes (1946–2011), military
- Katrina Honeyman (1950–2011), economic
- Ed Hooper (born 1964), Southern Appalachia, Tennessee, Old South
- A. G. Hopkins (born 1938), Britain
- Keith Hopkins (1934–2004), ancient
- Michiel Horn (born 1939), Canada
- Alistair Horne (1925–2017), modern French
- Gerald Horne (born 1949), US history, African-American, political history, labor history
- Daniel Horowitz (born 1954), US cultural
- Helen Lefkowitz Horowitz (born 1942), women
- Albert Hourani (1915–1993), Middle East
- Youssef Hourany (1931–2019), Lebanon, ancient
- François Houtart (1925–2017), France, history of religion, political history
- Michael Howard (1922–2019), military
- Ray Huang (1918–2000), China
- Leo Huberman (1903–1968), political history
- Robert Hughes (1938–2012), Australia, cities
- Marnie Hughes-Warrington (born 1970), historiography, philosophy of history
- Gershon Hundert (1946–2023), Jewish, early-modern Eastern Europe
- Andrew Hunt (born 1968), Cold War America
- Tristram Hunt (born 1974)
- Mark C. Hunter (born 1974), naval
- Paula Hyman (1946–2011), American-Jewish social history
[top]

==== I ====
- Octavio Ianni (1926–2004), Brazil, labor history, social history
- Moshe Idel (born 1947), Jewish history
- Georg Iggers (German, 1926–2017), modern Europe, historiography, and European intellectual history
- Evald Ilyenkov (1924–1979), history of philosophy
- Halil Inalcik (Turkish, 1916–2016), Ottoman Empire
- Kiyoshi Inoue (Japanese, 1913–2001), modern Japanese history
- Jonathan Israel (British, born 1946), Netherlands, the Age of Enlightenment, Jewry
[top]

==== J ====
- Eberhard Jäckel (1929–2017), Nazi Germany
- John Archibald Getty (1950–2025)
- Julian T. Jackson (born 1954), French
- C. L. R. James (1862–1935), Trinidad/England
- Harold James (born 1956), modern Germany
- Frederic Jameson (1934–2024), social history, cultural history
- Nikoloz Janashia (1931–1982), Georgia and Caucasus
- Simon Janashia (1900–1947), Georgia and Caucasus
- Ea Jansen (1921–2005), Finno-Ugric
- Marius Jansen (1922–2000), Japan
- Pawel Jasienica (1909–1970), Poland
- Rhodri Jeffreys-Jones (born 1942), US intelligence
- Merrill Jensen (1905–1980), American Revolution
- Richard J. Jensen (born 1941), America
- Julio César Jobet (1912–1980), Chile
- Khasnor Johan (born 1968), Malaysian historian
- Paul Johnson (1928–2023), Britain, Western civilization
- Robert Erwin Johnson (1923–2008), US naval
- Mauno Jokipii (1924–2007), Finnish, World War II
- A. H. M. Jones (1904–1970), later Roman Empire
- George Hilton Jones III (1924–2008), England
- Gwyn Jones (1907–1999), medieval
- Loe de Jong (1914–2005), Netherlands
- Tony Judt (1948–2010), 20th-century European, postwar
[top]

==== K ====
- Donald Kagan (1932–2021), ancient Greece
- George McTurnan Kahin (1918–2000), Southeast Asia
- Michel Kaplan (born 1946), French Byzantinist
- Efraim Karsh (born 1953), Israel
- Sartono Kartodirdjo (1921–2007), Indonesia
- David S. Katz (born 1953), early-modern England
- Alex J. Kay (born 1979), Nazi Germany
- Alexander Kazhdan (1922–1997), Bizantine studies
- Anna Keay (born 1974), early-modern England
- Elie Kedourie (1926–1992), Middle East
- Rod Kedward (1937–2023), 20th-century France
- John Keegan (1934–2012), military
- Robin Kelley (born 1962), US history, African-American, political history
- John H. Kemble (1912–1990), US maritime
- Paul Murray Kendall (1911–1973), late Middle Ages
- Elizabeth Topham Kennan (born 1938), medieval
- George F. Kennan (1904–2005), US–Soviet relations
- James Kennedy (born 1963), Netherlands
- Paul Kennedy (born 1945), world, military
- W. Hudson Kensel (1928–2014), western America
- Ian Kershaw (born 1943), Nazi Germany, Hitler
- Daniel J. Kevles (born 1939), science
- Rashid Khalidi (born 1948), Palestine
- Khan Roshan Khan (1914–1988), Pakistan
- Khoo Kay Kim (1937–2019), Malaysia
- Kim Jung-bae (born 1940), Korea
- Michael King (1945–2004), New Zealand
- Patrick Kinross (1904–1976), Ottoman Empire
- Maina wa Kinyatti (born 1944), Kenya
- Pierre Kipré (born 1945), Ivory Coast
- Henry Kissinger (1923–2023), 19th-century Europe; late 20th-century
- Martin Kitchen (born 1936), modern Europe
- Simon Kitson (born c. 1967), Vichy France
- Klemens von Klemperer (1916–2012), Germany
- Oleg Khlevniuk (born 1959), Soviet Union
- Alfred Klahr (1904–1944), Austria
- Fritz Klein (historian) (1924–2011), Germany, political history
- Matti Klinge (1936–2023), Finnish
- Felix Klos (born 1992), American/Dutch, modern European
- R.J.B. Knight (born 1944), British naval
- Yuri Knorozov (1922–1999), historical linguist
- Leo Kofler (1907–1995), Germany, social history
- Frank Kofsky (1935–1997), jazz
- Eberhard Kolb (born 1933), German
- Gabriel Kolko (1932–2014), US
- Claudia Koonz (born 1940), Nazi Germany
- Andrey Korotayev (born 1961), economic, Near East, Islamic and pre-Islamic
- Damodar Dharmananda Kosambi, (1907–1966), India
- Ernst Kossmann (1922–2003), Low Countries
- Conor Kostick (born 1964), medieval
- Stephen Kotkin (born 1959), Russia, Soviet Union
- Philip A. Kuhn (1933–2016), China
- Thomas Kuhn (1922–1996), science
- Robert Kurz (1943–2012), social history, economic history
- Myoma Myint Kywe (1960–2021), Burmese historian, journalist and belletrist
[top]

==== L ====
- Dubravko Lovrenović (1956–2017) Bosnian and Yugoslav historian
- Benjamin Woods Labaree (1927–2021), U.S. colonial and maritime
- Leopold Labedz (1920–1993), Soviet
- Walter LaFeber (1933–2021), diplomatic, Cold War
- Brij Lal (1952–2021), Fiji
- K. S. Lal (1920–2002), medieval India
- Đinh Xuân Lâm (1925–2017), Vietnam
- Andrew Lambert (born 1956), British naval
- Peter Lampe (born 1954), Hellenistic and late antiquity
- Ricardo Lancaster-Jones y Verea (1905–1983), haciendas in Western Mexico
- Dieter Langewiesche (born 1943), 19th–20th century, nationalism and liberalism
- Abdallah Laroui (born 1933), Maghreb
- David Lavender (1910–2003), American West
- Jacques Le Goff (1924–2014), medieval
- Emmanuel Le Roy Ladurie (1929–2023), French
- Daniel Leab (1936–2016), 20th century
- Eusebio Leal (1942–2020), Cuba
- Robert Leckie (1920–2001), U.S. military
- Henri Lefebvre (1901–1991), France, history of ideas, social history
- Ulrich L. Lehner (born 1976), intellectual and cultural history
- Lee Ki-baek (1924–2004), Korean
- Jill Lepore (born 1966), America
- William Leuchtenburg (1922–2025), U.S. political and legal
- Barbara Levick (1931–2023), Roman emperors
- Moshe Lewin (1921–2010), Russia, Soviet Union
- Bernard Lewis (1916–2018), Oriental studies
- David Levering Lewis (born 1936), African American, Harlem Renaissance
- Li Minqi (born 1969), Chinese, social history, political history
- Li Ao (1935–2018), Chinese
- Raffaele Licinio (1945–2018), medieval Italy
- Marcel Liebman (1929–1986), Marxism
- Peter Linebaugh (born 1942), Atlantic, British history, Irish history, labor history
- Kristen Lippincott (fl. 2026), art and cultural history
- Leon F. Litwack (1929–2021), America, African-American
- Xinru Liu (born 1951), ancient Indian and Chinese
- Mario Liverani (born 1939), ancient Middle East
- David Loades (1934–2016), Tudor England
- Roger Lockyer (1927–2017), Stuart England
- James W. Loewen (1942–2021), America
- Elizabeth Longford (1906–2002), Victorian England
- Erik Lönnroth (1910–2002), Scandinavia
- Walter Lord (1917–2002), America
- Domenico Losurdo (1941–2018), political history
- Michael Löwy (born 1938), Social history, political history
- John Lukacs (1924–2019), modern Europe
- Cesare Luporini (1909–1993), history of philosophy
[top]

==== M ====
- Achille Mbembe (born 1957), Cameroon
- Joseph A. McCartin (born 1959), American labor
- David McLellan (political scientist) (born 1940), political history, social history
- Charles B. MacDonald (1922–1990), World War II
- Stuart Macintyre (1947–2021), Australia
- Piers Mackesy (1924–2014), British military
- Margaret MacMillan (born 1943), 20th-century international relations
- William Miller Macmillan (1885–1974), liberal South African historiography
- Ramsay MacMullen (1928–2022), Roman
- Heidrun E. Mader (born 1977), 2nd-century BCE – 2nd-century CE
- Magnus Magnusson (1929–2007), Norse
- Charles S. Maier (born 1939), 20th-century Europe
- Paul L. Maier (1930–2025), ancient history
- Pauline Maier (1938–2013), early America
- Leonid Makhnovets (1919–1993), Ukrainian literature
- Leonard Maltin (born 1950), film
- William Manchester (1922–2004), Churchill
- Ernest Mandel (1923–1995), Belgium, economic history
- Golo Mann (1909–1994), general
- Susan Mann (born 1941), Canadian
- Susan L. Mann (born 1943), history of China and women
- Adel Manna (born 1947), Palestine in Ottoman period
- María Emma Mannarelli (born 1954), social
- Philip Mansel (born 1951), France, Ottoman Empire
- Manning Marable (1950–2011), African-American, political history
- Sam Marcy (1911–1998), Political history
- Arthur Marder (1910–1980), British naval
- Ruy Mauro Marini (1932–1997), Latin America and economic history
- Michael Marrus (1941–2022), French and Jewish
- Rev. F. X. Martin (1922–2000), Irish medievalist and campaigner
- Henri-Jean Martin (1924–2007), the Book
- Luis Martínez-Fernández (born 1960), Cuba, the Caribbean
- Laurence Marvin (living), US, French medievalist
- Ezequiel González Mas (1919–2007), Spanish literature
- Timothy Mason (1940–1990), Nazi Germany
- Paul Mattick (1904–1981), Germany, economic history, political history, labor history
- Garrett Mattingly (1900–1962), early modern Europe
- Ernest R. May (1928–2009), 20th-century warfare and international relations
- Richard J. Maybury (born 1946), America, World War I, World War II, Middle East
- Arno J. Mayer (1926–2023), World War I and Europe
- Sarah Maza (born c. 1954), early modern and modern France
- Mark Mazower (born 1958), Balkans, Greece
- Santo Mazzarino (1916–1987), Ancient Rome
- David McCullough (1933–2022), US
- Forrest McDonald (1927–2016), early national America, presidency, business
- K. B. McFarlane (1903–1966), English medievalist
- William S. McFeely (1930–2019), American Civil War
- Randall H. McGuire (born 1951), archaeology
- Maurie McInnis (born 1966), Antebellum art and politics
- W. David McIntyre (1932–2022), Commonwealth, New Zealand
- Neil McKendrick (born 1935), modern economic and social history
- Ross McKibbin (born 1942), 20th-century Britain
- Rosamond McKitterick (born 1949), medieval
- William McNeill (1917–2016), world
- James M. McPherson (born 1936), American Civil War
- Michael McWilliam (born 1933), British Commonwealth
- Jon Meacham (born 1969), US presidency
- D. W. Meinig (1924–2020), US geography
- Giorgi Melikishvili (1918–2002), Georgia, Caucasus, Middle East
- Evaldo Cabral de Mello (born 1936), Dutch Brazil
- Russell Menard (living), colonial American
- Thomas C. Mendenhall (1910–1998), history of sport
- René Zavaleta Mercado (1937–1984), Bolivia
- Josef W. Meri (born 1969), Islamic world, Jews
- John M. Merriman (1946–2022), France
- Barbara Metcalf (born 1941), India
- Roin Metreveli (born 1939), Georgia and Caucasus
- Michael A. Meyer, (1937-), Jewish history
- Rade Mihaljčić (1937–2020), medieval Serbia
- Ralph Miliband (1924–1994), political history, social history
- Perry Miller (1905–1963), US intellectual
- Giles Milton (born 1966), exploration
- Zora Mintalová – Zubercová (born 1950), food history and material culture of Central Europe
- Steven Mintz (born 1953), US family
- Yagutil Mishiev (1927–2024), Derbent, Dagestan, Russia
- Arnaldo Momigliano (1908–1987), ancient world
- Hans Mommsen (1930–2015), Germany
- Wolfgang Mommsen (1930–2004), Britain, Germany
- Indro Montanelli (1909–2001) general
- Simon Sebag Montefiore (born 1965), Russia, Middle East
- Theodore William Moody (1907–1984), Ireland
- Harri Moora (1900–1968), Estonian archaeology
- Enrique Ayala Mora (born 1950), Ecuador
- Franco Moretti (born 1950), Italy, literary history
- Edmund Morgan (1916–2013), American colonial and Revolution
- Kenneth O. Morgan (born 1934), British politics, Wales
- William J. Morgan (1917–2003), US naval
- Samuel Eliot Morison (1887–1976), US colonial and naval
- Benny Morris (born 1948), Middle East
- Ian Mortimer (born 1967), Middle Ages
- W.L. Morton (1908–1980), Canada
- George Mosse (1918–1999), German, Jewish, fascist, sexual
- Hans Mottek (1910–1993), Economic history, Germany
- Roland Mousnier (1907–1993), early modern France
- Mubarak Ali (born 1941), Pakistan
- Robert K. Murray (1922–2019), 20th-century US
- David Muskhelishvili (born 1928), Georgia
- David N. Myers (1960-), Jewish history
[top]

==== N ====
- J. Milton Nance (1913–1997), American writer on the history of Texas
- Hernán Ramírez Necochea (1917–1979), Chile
- Joseph Needham (1900–1995), Chinese science and technology
- Antonio Negri (1933–2023), Political history
- Mark E. Neely Jr. (born 1944), American Civil War
- Malcolm Neesam (1946–2022), history of Harrogate, North Yorkshire, England
- José Paulo Netto (born 1947), Brazil
- Cynthia Neville (living), late medieval, Scotland and England, Gaelic culture
- Thomas Nipperdey (1927–1992), 19th c. German history
- Ernst Nolte (1923–2016), German, fascism and communism
[top]

==== O ====
- Josiah Ober (living), ancient Greece
- Heiko Oberman (1930–2001), Reformation
- Ambeth Ocampo (born 1961), Philippines
- Tom O'Lincoln, (1947–2023), Australia
- W. H. Oliver (1925–2015), New Zealand
- Robin O'Neil (living), Holocaust
- Neil Oliver (born 1967)
- Jean-Marc Olivier (born 1961), aeronautics
- Vincent O'Malley (born 1967), New Zealand
- Melanie Oppenheimer (living), Australia
- Vincent Orange (1935–2012), military, World War II, aviation
- Michael Oren (born 1955), modern Middle East
- Margaret Ormsby (1909–1996), Canada
- İlber Ortaylı (born 1947), Turkey
- Marius Ostrowski (born 1988), European social democracy
- Fernand Ouellet (1926–2021), French Canada
- Richard Overy (born 1947), World War II
- Steven Ozment (1939–2019), Germany
[top]

==== P ====
- George Padmore (1903–1959), Africa
- Thomas Pakenham (born 1933), Africa
- Madhavan K. Palat (born 1947), Russia and Europe
- Ilan Pappé (born 1954), Israel
- Michael Parenti (1933–2026), US history, ancient Rome
- Peter Paret (1924–2020), military
- Geoffrey Parker (born 1943), early modern military
- Simo Parpola (born 1943), ancient Middle East
- J. H. Parry (1914–1982), maritime
- T. T. Paterson (1909–1994), archaeologist and sociologist
- Fred Patten (1940–2018), science fiction
- Kurt Pätzold, (1930–2016), Political history, Germany
- Stanley G. Payne (born 1934), Spain, fascism
- Abel Paz (1921–2009), Spanish anarchist
- Brian Pearce (1915–2008),
- Mário Pedrosa (1900-1981), Brazil, art history
- William Armstrong Percy (1933–2022), medieval Europe and ancient Greek and Roman, homosexuality
- Bradford Perkins (1925–2008), US diplomatic
- Detlev Peukert (1950–1990), everyday life in the Weimar and Nazi eras
- John Edward Philips (born 1952), Africa
- Đặng Phong (1937–2010), Vietnam, economic history
- Liza Picard (1927–2022), London
- William B. Pickett (born 1940), US history, Dwight D. Eisenhower
- David Pietrusza (born 1949), US
- Boris B. Piotrovsky (1908–1990), Urartu, Scythia
- Richard Pipes (1923–2018), Russian and Soviet
- J.H. Plumb (1911–2001), 18th-century Britain
- J. G. A. Pocock (1924–2023), early modern intellectual
- Boris Ponomarev, (1905–1995), Soviet history
- Kwok Kin Poon (born 1949), Chinese Southern and Northern dynasties
- Barbara Corrado Pope (born 1941), America, Belle Époque, women's studies
- Boris Porshnev, (1905–1972), France
- Roy Porter (1946–2002), medicine, British social and cultural
- Moishe Postone (1942–2018), social history, political history, economic history and intellectual history
- Nikos Poulantzas (1936–1979), political history
- Norman Pounds (1912–2006), geography and England
- Caio Prado Júnior (1907–1990), Brazil
- Gordon W. Prange (1910–1980), World War II Pacific
- Vijay Prashad (born 1967), India, cultural history, political history
- Joshua Prawer (1917–1990), Crusades
- Jean-Claude Pressac (1944–2003), Holocaust
- Michael Prestwich (born 1943), medieval England
- Clement Alexander Price (1945–2014), America
- Francis Paul Prucha (1921–2015), American Indians
- Janko Prunk (born 1942), Slovenia
- Alenka Puhar (born 1945), Slovenia
[top]

==== Q ====
- Carroll Quigley (1910–1977), classical, western history, theorist of civilizations
- Aníbal Quijano (1930–2018), Peru, colonial history
- Felipe Quispe (1942–2021), Bolivia, economic history
[top]

==== R ====
- Marc Raeff (1923–2008), Russian Empire
- Alexander Rabinowitch (born 1934), Russia
- Werner Rahn (1939–2022), German naval
- Jack N. Rakove (born 1947), U.S. Constitution and early politics
- Jacques Rancière (born 1940), social history, political history, history of philosophy
- Terence Ranger (1929–2015), Zimbabwe
- Arius Raposas (born 1996), Filipino and Asian history
- Šerbo Rastoder (born 1956), Montenegrin
- George Rawick (1929–1990), US history, slavery
- Marcus Rediker (born 1951), piracy and the Middle Passage
- Helmut Reichelt (born 1939), economic history, social history
- Robert V. Remini (1921–2013), Jacksonian democracy in the U.S.
- René Rémond (1918–2007), French politics
- Francesco Renda, (1922–2013), Sicily
- Timothy Reuter (1947–2002), medieval Germany
- Ofelia Rey Castelao (born 1956), Spanish Galician women
- Henry A. Reynolds (born 1938), Australia
- Susan Reynolds (1929–2021), medieval
- Richard Rhodes (born 1937), World War II, hydrogen bomb
- Nicholas V. Riasanovsky (1923–2011), Russia
- Darcy Ribeiro (1922–1997), Brazil
- Jonathan Riley-Smith (1938–2016), Crusades
- Blaze Ristovski (1931–2018), Macedonia
- Charles Ritcheson (1925–2011), Anglo–US relations 1775–1815
- Gerhard A. Ritter (1929–2015), Germany
- Andrew Roberts (born 1963), Britain
- Geoffrey Roberts (born 1952), World War II, Soviet Union
- J. M. Roberts (1928–2003), Europe
- Jane Robinson (born 1959), women's history
- Nicholas A. M. Rodger (born 1949), British naval
- William Ledyard Rodgers (1860–1944), ancient naval
- Maxime Rodinson (1915–2004), oriental studies
- Walter Rodney (1942–1980), Guyana
- David Roediger (born 1952), political history, labor history, slavery
- Vadim Rogovin (1937–1998), Soviet Union, Trotskyism
- Theodore Ropp (1911–2000), military
- W. J. Rorabaugh (1945–2020), 19th- and 20th-century US
- Ron Rosenbaum (born 1946), Hitler
- Charles E. Rosenberg (born 1936), medicine and science
- Gavriel D. Rosenfeld (1967-), Jewish history
- Stephen Roskill (1903–1982), British naval
- Maarten van Rossem (born 1943), 20th-century US
- María Rostworowski (1915–2016), Peruvian
- Constance Rover (1910–2005), feminism
- Sheila Rowbotham (born 1943), feminism, socialism
- Herbert H. Rowen (1916–1999), Netherlands
- A. L. Rowse (1903–1997), English
- Maximilien Rubel (1905–1996), political history
- Miri Rubin (born 1956), social, Europe 1100–1600
- George Rudé (1910–1993), French Revolution
- Robert W. Thurston (born 1949)
- R. J. Rummel (1932–2014), genocide
- Steven Runciman (1903–2000), Crusades
- Leila J. Rupp (born 1950), feminist
- Conrad Russell, 5th Earl Russell (1937–2004), 17th-century Britain
- Marina Rustow, Jewish history
- Cornelius Ryan (1920–1974), World War II, popular
- Boris Rybakov (1908–2001), Soviet
[top]

==== S ====
- Emir Sader (born 1943), Brazil, social history, political history
- Heleieth Saffioti (1934–2010), Brazil, social history
- Tatshat Sahakyan (1916–1999), Armenia
- Edgar V. Saks (1910–1984), Estonia
- Andrey Sakharov (1930–2019), Russia
- Anne Salmond (born 1945), Pacific and New Zealand anthropology and history
- Dominic Sandbrook (born 1974), recent Britain and America
- Theotônio dos Santos (1936–2018), Latin America, economic history
- Usha Sanyal (living), Asian, Islam, Sufism
- S. Srikanta Sastri (1904–1974), Indian
- Waltraut Schälike (1927–2021), philosophical history
- Simon Schama (born 1945), British, Dutch, US, French
- Arthur Schlesinger, Jr. (1917–2007), Andrew Jackson, New Deal, politics
- Karl Schlögel (born 1948), modern Russian history
- Rene Schmerling (1901–1967), Georgian art
- Jean-Claude Schmitt (born 1946), Middle Ages
- David Schoenbaum (born 1935), modern German and US–Israeli relations
- Ismar Schorsch (born 1935), Jewish history
- Carl Emil Schorske (1915–2015), Vienna, Modernism, intellectual
- Paul W. Schroeder (1927–2020), European diplomacy
- Wolfgang Schröder (1935–2010), Germany, labor
- D. M. Schurman (1924–2013), British imperial and naval
- Marjan Schwegman (living), Dutch
- Karl Schweizer (living), 18th-century European
- Dorothy Schwieder, (1933–2014), Iowa
- Joan Scott (born 1941), feminism
- William Henry Scott (1921–1993), Philippines
- Howard Hayes Scullard (1903–1983), ancient
- Jules Sedney (1922–2020), Surinamese historian and former prime minister
- Tom Segev (born 1945), Israel
- Xosé Manoel Núñez Seixas (born 1966), Spain, cultural history of war
- Lorelle D. Semley (born 1969), American historian of Africa
- Robert Service (born 1947), Soviet, Russian
- Dasharatha Sharma (1903–1976), Rajasthan
- Ram Sharan Sharma (1919–2011), ancient India
- Helena Sheehan (born 1944), political history
- James J. Sheehan (born 1937), modern Germany
- Michael S. Sherry (born 1945), 20th-century American military; LGBTQ
- William L. Shirer (1904–1993), 20th-century Europe, Third Reich
- Avi Shlaim (born 1945), Israel and the Middle East
- Ishimoda Shō (1912–1986), ancient Japan
- He Shu (born 1948), Chinese cultural revolution
- Dhimitër Shuteriqi (1915–2003), Albanian literature
- Arkady Sidorov, (1900–1966), Russia
- Jack Simmons (1915–2000), English historian, railway history
- Keith Sinclair (1922–1993), New Zealand
- Helene J. Sinnreich (born 1975), Holocaust
- Nathan Sivin (1931–2022), China
- Quentin Skinner (born 1940), early-modern Britain
- Alexandre Skirda (1942–2020), Russia
- Theda Skocpol (born 1947), institutions and comparative method; sociological
- Morris Slavin (1913–2006), French Revolution
- Richard Slotkin (born 1942), US environment and West
- Cornelius Cole Smith, Jr. (1913–2004), military history, American Old West
- Digby Smith (1935–2024), military
- Henry Nash Smith (1906–1986), US cultural
- Jean Edward Smith (1932–2019), US foreign policy, constitutional law, biography
- Page Smith (1917–1995), U.S.
- Richard Norton Smith (born 1953), US presidential
- T. C. Smout (born 1933), Scottish environmental and social
- John Smolenski, (born 1973), American colonial period
- Louis Leo Snyder (1907–1993), German nationalism
- Timothy D. Snyder (born 1969), Eastern Europe
- Albert Soboul (1913–1982), French Revolution
- Nelson Werneck Sodré (1911–1999), Brazil, cultural history, political history, literature
- Aleksandr Solzhenitsyn (1918–2008), Russian historian of the Gulag
- Pat Southern (born 1948), ancient Rome
- R. W. Southern (1912–2001), medieval
- E. Lee Spence (born 1947), shipwrecks
- Jonathan Spence (1936–2021), China
- Jonathan Sperber (born 1952), American historian of Europe
- Jackson J. Spielvogel (born 1939), world
- Paolo Spriano (1925–1988), Italy
- Kenneth Stampp (1912–2009), U.S. South, slavery
- George Stanley (1907–2002), Canada
- David Starkey (born 1945), Tudor
- Leften Stavros Stavrianos (1913—2004), world
- James M. Stayer (1935–2025), German Reformation
- G. E. M. de Ste. Croix (1910–2000), Ancient Greece
- Valerie Steele (born 1955), fashion
- Jonathan Steinberg (1934–2021), American historian of Germany
- Jean Stengers (1922–2002), Belgian
- Fritz Stern (1926–2016), Germany and Jewish
- Zeev Sternhell (1935–2020), fascism
- William N. Still, Jr. (1932–2022), US naval
- Dan Stone (living), recent Europe
- Lawrence Stone (1919–1999), early modern British social, economic and family
- Norman Stone (1941–2019), military
- Hew Strachan (born 1949), military
- Barry S. Strauss (born 1953), ancient military
- Michael Stürmer (born 1938), modern German
- Ronald Suleski (born 1942), China
- Ronald Grigor Suny (born 1940), Soviet Union, Armenia, Russia
- Jean Suret-Canale, (1921–2007), Africa
- Viktor Suvorov (born 1947), Soviet Union
- Ronald Syme (1903–1989), ancient Rome, Roman Empire
- David Syrett (1939–2004), British naval
[top]

==== T ====
- Manfredo Tafuri (1935–1994), architecture
- Volodia Teitelboim (1916–2008), Chile
- Ronald Takaki (1939–2009), America, ethnic studies
- J. L. Talmon (1916–1980), Modern, The Origins of Totalitarian Democracy
- Ali Tandilava (1913–1985), Laz people
- Maik Tändler (born 1979), German psychology and political thought
- Alexander Tarasov, (born 1958), politics and society
- Alasdair and Hettie Tayler (1870–1937/1869–1951), Scotland
- A. J. P. Taylor (1906–1990), Britain, modern Europe
- Abdelhadi Tazi (1921–2015), Moroccan
- Adam J. Teller (1962-), Jewish history
- Antonio Tellez (1921–2005), Spanish Anarchism, anti-fascist resistance
- Harold Temperley (1879–1939), 19th- and early-20th-century diplomacy
- Eugenia Tenenbaum (born 1996), Art
- Emmanuel Terray (1935–2024), France, political history
- Romila Thapar (born 1931), ancient India
- Françoise Thébaud (born 1952), history of women
- Stephan Thernstrom (1934–2025), US ethnic
- Barbara Thiering (1930–2015), Biblical
- Joan Thirsk (1922–2013), agriculture
- Hugh Thomas (1931–2017), Spanish Civil War, Atlantic slave trade
- Keith Thomas (born 1933), early-modern Britain, culture
- E. A. Thompson (1914–1995), ancient, medieval
- E. P. Thompson (1924–1993), British labor history
- Mark Thompson (born 1959), Balkans, World War I Italy
- Carl L. Thunberg (born 1963), Viking Age, Middle Ages
- Charles Tilly (1929–2008), Modern Europe; politics and society
- Louise A. Tilly (1930–2018), modern Europe; women, family
- José Ramos Tinhorão (1928–2021), Brazil, Brazilian culture, music
- John Toland (1912–2004), World War I and World War II
- K. Ross Toole (1920–1981), Montana
- Adam Tooze (1967), economic history
- Ahmed Toufiq (born 1943), Moroccan
- Éric Toussaint (born 1954), economic history
- Marc Trachtenberg (born 1946), Cold War
- Enzo Traverso, (born 1957), Holocaust, totalitarianism, historiography
- Hugh Trevor-Roper (1914–2003), Nazi; British
- Francesca Trivellato (1970-), Italian, Jewish early-modern period
- Petro Tronko (1915–2011), Ukrainian history
- Gil Troy (born 1961), modern US, the Presidency
- Marcel Trudel (1917–2011), New France, slavery in Canada
- Barbara Tuchman (1912–1989), 20th-century military
- Robert C. Tucker (1918–2010), Stalin
- Peter Turchin (born 1957), Russian historian of historical dynamics
- Henry Ashby Turner, Jr. (1932–2008), 20th-century German
- Denis Twitchett (1925–2006), China
- David Tyack (1930–2016), US education
[top]

==== U ====
- Walter Ullmann (1910–1983), medieval
- Laurel Thatcher Ulrich (born 1938), early America
- David Underdown (1925–2009), 17th-century England
- Mladen Urem (born 1964), Croatian literary
- Robert M. Utley (1929–2022), 19th-century US West
[top]

==== V ====
- Hans van de Ven (born 1958), Britain, modern China
- Frank Vandiver (1925–2005), American Civil War
- Jan Vansina (1929–2017), Belgium, Africa
- Horpyna Vatchenko (1923–2004), Ukraine
- Andrekos Varnava (born 1979), Australia, modern history
- Jean-Pierre Vernant (1914–2007), France, ancient Greece
- Paul Veyne (1930–2022), France, ancient Greece and Rome
- Pierre Vidal-Naquet (1930–2006), France, ancient Greece; civil-rights activist
- Pierre Vilar, (1906–2003), Catalonia
- Richard Vinen (born 1963), Britain
- Lynne Viola (born 1955), Soviet Union
- Emília Viotti da Costa (1928–2017), Brazil
- Jaime Vicens Vives (1910–1960), Spain
- Lise Vogel (born 1938), art history
- Michel Vovelle (1933–2018), French Revolution
[top]

==== W ====
- P. B. Waite, (1922 –2020), Canadian politics
- John Waiko (1945–2024), Papua New Guinea
- J. Samuel Walker (born 1946), nuclear energy and weapons
- Immanuel Wallerstein (1930–2019), world-systems theory
- Retha Warnicke (born 1939), Tudor and gender issues
- Peter Watson (born 1943), intellectual history
- Eugen Weber (1925–2007), modern French
- Cicely Veronica Wedgwood (1910–1997), 16th/17th-century Europe
- Hans-Ulrich Wehler (1931–2014), 19th-century German social
- Russell Weigley (1930–2004), military
- Gerhard Weinberg (born 1928), Germany, World War II
- Merry E. Wiesner-Hanks (born 20th century), European, gender and world history
- Roberto Weiss (1906–1969), Renaissance
- Emma J. Wells (born 1986), church history
- Frank Welsh (1931–2023), British imperial
- Liselotte Welskopf-Henrich (1901–1979), Germany, US history, ancient Greece
- Christopher Whatley (born 20th century), Scotland
- John Wheeler-Bennett (1902–1975), Germany
- John Whyte (1928–1990), Northern Ireland, divided societies
- Christopher Wickham (born 1950), medieval
- Robert H. Wiebe (1930–2000), American business and society
- Toby Wilkinson (born 1969), ancient Egypt
- Eric Williams (1911–1981), Guiana, Caribbean
- Glanmor Williams (1920–2005), Wales
- Glyndwr Williams (1932–2022), exploration
- Raymond Williams (1921–1988), cultural history
- William Appleman Williams (1921–1990), US diplomacy
- John Willingham (born 1946), Texas
- Andrew Wilson (born 1961), Ukraine
- Clyde N. Wilson (born 1941), 19th-century US South
- Ian Wilson (born 1941), religious
- Keith Windschuttle (1942–2025), Australia; historiography
- Henry Winkler (born 1938), German
- Robert S. Wistrich (1945–2015), anti-semitism, Holocaust, Jews
- John B. Wolf (1907–1996), French
- Michael Wolffsohn (born 1947), German Jewish
- Herwig Wolfram (born 1934), medieval
- John Womack (born 1937), Latin American history, Mexico history
- Gordon S. Wood (1933-2026), American Revolution
- Ellen Meiksins Wood (1942–2016), Marxist political and economic history
- Michael Wood (born 1948), England
- C. Vann Woodward (1908–1999), American South
- Daniel Woolf (born 1958), Britain, historiography
- David Wootton (born 1952), intellectual history, history of science
- Lucy Worsley (born 1973), Britain
- Gordon Wright (1912–2000), modern France
- Lawrence C. Wroth (1884–1970), US printing
[top]

==== Y ====
- Yen Ching-hwang (顏清湟, born 1937), writer; works on Overseas Chinese history
- Yosef Hayim Yerushalmi (1932–2009), Jewish history
- Robert J. Young (born 1942), French Third Republic
- Robert M. Young (1935–2019), medicine
[top]

==== Z ====
- Gregorio F. Zaide (1907–1986), Philippines
- Adam Zamoyski (born 1949), Napoleonic era
- Anna Żarnowska (1931–2007), Polish historian
- Alfred-Maurice de Zayas (born 1947), German
- Yuri Zhukov (1938–2023), Soviet
- Howard Zinn (1922–2010), US
- Rainer Zitelmann (born 1957), German
- Vladislav M. Zubok (born 1958), Cold War
- Marek Żukow-Karczewski (born 1961), Poland, Kraków
[top]

== See also ==
General

- Historiography
  - Historiography of the British Empire
  - Historiography of the United Kingdom
  - Historiography of Canada
  - Historiography of China
  - Historiography of the French Revolution
  - Historiography of Germany
  - Historiography of the United States
  - Historiography of World War II
- History
- List of history journals

Lists of historians

- Area of study
- Canadian
- England (Middle Ages)
- French
  - Revolution
  - Contemporary
- Greek
- Irish
- Jewish
- Russian

== Bibliography ==
- The American Historical Association's Guide to Historical Literature, ed. by Mary Beth Norton and Pamela Gerardi (3rd ed. 2 vol, Oxford UP, 1995), 2064 pages; annotated guide to 27,000 of the most important English language history books in all fields and topics vol 1 online, vol 2 online
  - Allison, William Henry et al. eds. A guide to historical literature (1931), comprehensive bibliography for scholarship to 1930 as selected by scholars from the American Historical Association online edition
- Barnes, Harry Elmer. A history of historical writing (1962)
- Barnes, Harry Elmer. History, its rise and development: a survey of the progress of historical writing from its origins to the present day (1922), online
- Barraclough, Geoffrey. History: Main Trends of Research in the Social and Human Sciences, (1978)
- Bentley, Michael. ed., Companion to Historiography, Routledge, 1997, ISBN 9780415285575; 39 chapters by experts
- Boia, Lucian, ed. Great Historians of the Modern Age: An International Dictionary (Greenwood, 1991), 868 pp.
- Boyd, Kelly, ed. (1999). Encyclopedia of Historians and Historical Writing. Taylor and Francis 2 vol. ISBN 978-1-884964-33-6.; detailed coverage of historians and major themes
- Breisach, Ernst. Historiography: Ancient, Medieval and Modern, 3rd edition, 2007, ISBN 0-226-07278-9
- Elton, G. R. Modern Historians on British History 1485–1945: A Critical Bibliography 1945–1969 (1969), annotated guide to 1000 history books on every major topic, plus book reviews and major scholarly articles. online
- Gilderhus, Mark T. History and Historians: A Historiographical Introduction, 2002, ISBN 0-13-044824-9
- Gooch, G. P. History and historians in the nineteenth century (1913), online
- Iggers, Georg G. Historiography in the 20th Century: From Scientific Objectivity to the Postmodern Challenge (2005)
- Kramer, Lloyd, and Sarah Maza, eds. A Companion to Western Historical Thought Blackwell 2006. 520pp; ISBN 978-1-4051-4961-7
- Momigliano, Arnaldo. The Classical Foundation of Modern Historiography, 1990, ISBN 978-0-226-07283-8
- Rahman, M. M. ed. Encyclopaedia of Historiography (2006), Excerpt and text search
- E. Sreedharan, A Textbook of Historiography, 500 B.C. to A.D. 2000 (2004)
- Thompson, James, and Bernard J. Holm. A History of Historical Writing: Volume I: From the Earliest Times to the End of the Seventeenth Century (2nd ed. 1967), 678 pp.; A History of Historical Writing: Volume II: The Eighteenth and Nineteenth Centuries (2nd ed. 1967), 676 pp.; highly detailed coverage of European writers to 1900
- Woolf, D. R. A Global Encyclopedia of Historical Writing (Garland Reference Library of the Humanities) (2 vols. 1998), excerpt and text search
- Woolf, Daniel, et al. The Oxford History of Historical Writing (5 vol 2011–12), covers all major historians since ancient times to present; see vol 1
