= John Willingham =

American novelist

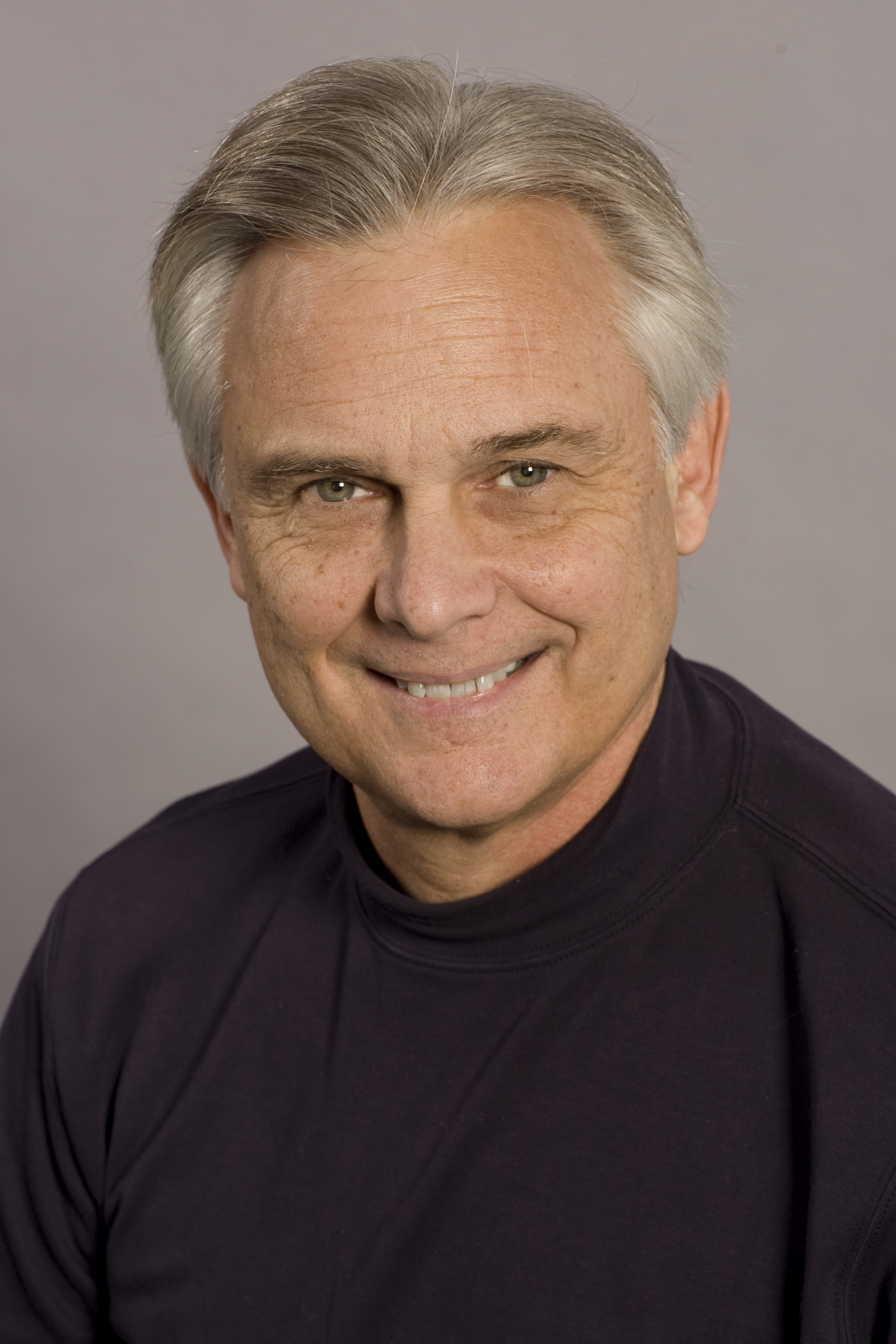
- John Willingham, 2011
- Born: Waco, Texas, U.S.
- Education: University of Texas at Austin
- Occupations: Writer; editor; historian
- Known for: The first and only in-depth quantitative evaluations of public university honors programs; essays on Texas history and literature; historical novels set in Texas
- Website: https://www.johnwillingham.net/

John Willingham is an American writer and editor known for his novel The Last Woman, for his collections of reviews about honors programs at public universities in the United States, for his essays about history, literature, politics, and religion, and for The Edge of Freedom: A Fact-Based Novel of the Texas Revolution. The Revolution was his subject once more in his paper "Should We Forget the Alamo?: Myths, Slavery, and the Texas Revolution (2023). In 2011, he founded and became editor of Public University Honors, a website that evaluates more than 50 college honors programs and provides information about honors programs in general.

He is opposed to numerical rankings of colleges or honors programs, asserting in the 2018 edition that "Rankings presume a perfection that they cannot meet." His reviews place programs in groups, with the top group of 10 or so receiving the highest rating.

Willingham has been a contributor to the History News Network, which has published about two dozen of his essays and opinion pieces. During the same period, his work appeared in a variety of publications including The Texas Observer online, Religion Dispatches, and the San Antonio Express-News.

Born in Waco, Willingham graduated from Richfield High School and holds a bachelor's degree with honors and a master's degree in history from the University of Texas at Austin. He served as McLennan County, Texas, elections administrator from 1984 through 1992, and Williamson County, Texas, Elections Administrator from 1993 through 2009. In September 1998, he served as an Organization for Security and Cooperation in Europe (OSCE) election coordinator for the general election in the district of Brcko, under the dual sovereignty of Bosnia and Serbia. From 2001–05, he was a member of the National Task Force on Election Reform made up of state and local election officials. Assisted by funding related to the Help America Vote Act of 2002, the task force worked to improve the security and integrity of U.S. elections.

== Publications ==
=== Non-fiction books ===
- A Review of Fifty Public University Honors Programs, Public University Press, 2014
- Inside Honors: Ratings and Reviews of Sixty Public University Honors Programs, Public University Press, 2016
- Inside Honors 2018-2019: Ratings and Reviews of 50 Public University Honors Programs, Public University Press, 2018
- Inside Honors 2020-2021: Ratings and Reviews of 40 Public University Honors Programs, Public University Press, 2020

=== Novels ===
- The Edge of Freedom, A Fact-Based Novel of the Texas Revolution, Inkwater Press, 2011
- The Last Woman, TCU Press, 2025 On March 31, 2026, the Center for the Study of the American West at West Texas A&M University notified TCU Press that the novel was shortlisted for the Bonney MacDonald Outstanding Western Book of the Year.

=== Selected Op-Eds ===
- "Glenn Beck’s Christianity and Abraham Lincoln’s Religion, HNN, 2010
- "Historical Fiction and the 'Gaps' in Academic History", HNN, 2011
- "J.H. Plumb Would Be Aghast at Today's Distorted History", HNN, 2011
- "Sarah Palin and the Static God", Religion Dispatches, 2010
- "Waco: The City Where the Waco Siege Didn't Actually Happen", HNN, 2013
- "White College Grads Preferred Donald Trump; This Raises the Question, What Happened to Critical Thinking?", HNN, 2016
- "Do a Majority of Republicans Really Distrust Higher Education?", HNN, 2017
- "What's Driving the Latest Texas History Wars?", HNN, 2022

=== Literary and Academic Publications ===
- "Summertime Passing", Southwest Review, short story, 1975
- "John Graves, Larry McMurtry, and the Nature of Goodbyes", Southwest Review, essay, 2015
- "Paulette Jiles and the Aura of the News", essay, San Antonio Review, 2021
- "The Real Sickness in America", essay, San Antonio Review, 2022
- "Should We Forget the Alamo? Myths, Slavery, and the Texas Revolution", essay, Southwestern Historical Quarterly, 2023

== See also ==
- List of historians
