= Mladen Urem =

Croatian writer and literary critic

Mladen Urem (born 16 April 1964) is a literary critic, author and editor.

Urem was born in Rijeka, Croatia, where he received his BSc in radiology from the Medical School in Rijeka and also a B. A. in the Croatian language and literature from the Faculty of Philosophy.

During 1980–82, he was a singer and a guitarist with a new-wave & punk rock group Istočni izlaz (The Eastern Exit). His name appears in The Little Encyclopaedia of Croatian Pop and Rock Music (1994). He was the literary editor of the Val journal (The Wave, 1985–1989), founder and editor-in-chief of the Rival literary magazine (1988–2000) and also of the Biblioteka Val — an original titles series (since 1987). He co-founded the philological magazine Fluminensia (1989), founded and served as the editor-in-chief in the Sušačka revija culture magazine (1993–1995) and as the editor-in-chief of the journal called Dometi (1996).

In the war-edition of the Rival (1-4/1991), Urem published the first retrospection of the Croatian literary works written on the frontlines at the beginning of the Croatian War of Independence (1991–1995).

During its thirteen years of existence, the Rival featured 800 authors and their works from the fields of Croatian and world literature and arts. During that period, the magazine presented many of the phenomena in the 90s world culture, as well as the authors that would later receive important awards and honours (the Nobel Prize for V. S. Naipaul and many other authors and prizes) and was considered one of the most significant Croatian journals. The Rival magazine also published the English translations of the Croatian literary texts and developed a substantial collaboration with various world magazines and journals published in English.

He has authored the following titles: Riječki krug redom (1987), Pogledom u riječ (1987), Janko Polić Kamov – Selected Short Stories and Poems (1997), Dan velikih valova (prose and poetry by the Rival-generation, with the complete Rival bibliography 1988–2000, as well as the 1987–2001 series, co-authored with Goran Ušljebrka and Milan Zagorac, 2001), Pavica Julija Kaftanić (co-authored with Boris Zakošek, Lovorka Ruck and Igor Žic, 2005), Southerly Thoughts and Other Stories (An Anthology of Croatian Short Stories by Ksaver Šandor Gjalski, Janko Polić Kamov, Miroslav Krleža, Vladan Desnica, Ranko Marinković, Slobodan Novak, Ivan Aralica, Ivan Slamnig, Antun Šoljan and Nedjeljko Fabrio — selection by Mladen Urem, Damir Biličić and Želimir Galjanić, 2005) and Janko Polić Kamov, Dora Maar i hrvatska avangarda (Janko Polić Kamov, Dora Maar and Croatian Avantgarde, 2006).

Many of his essays and studies concerning the topics from the contemporary Croatian literature, especially studies of writer Janko Polić Kamov (Rijeka 1886 – Barcelona 1910), his life and work, have appeared in various American and Croatian periodicals. In collaboration with Dolores Čikić and Boris Zakošek, he explored Dora Maar's genealogy for the Parisian Andriveau, also publishing the findings in the Croatian daily Večernji list, as well as in the book Dora Maar - zatočenica pogleda (Dora Maar: Prisonniere du regard) by Alicia Dujovne Ortiz (Zagreb, 2004).

Urem is frequent a contributor to the US literary journals Grand Street (New York City), Partisan Review (Boston), World Literature Today (Norman, Oklahoma) and Corner (Oakland, California), in which he has also published various works by the Croatian writers Janko Polić Kamov, Miroslav Krleža, Ivo Andrić and Ivan Goran Kovačić. He has collaborated with the famous US authors and editors Deborah Treisman (1971), William Phillips (1907–2002), Robert Bingham (1966–1999) and others, as well as with the British historian Lucy Hughes-Hallett (1953).

Urem has published almost 200 texts concerning the field of Croatian literature, and edited as many books. On more than one occasion has he been a member of the jury for the literary awards Drago Gervais and Nagrada grada Rijeke (The City of Rijeka Award). He is a member of the Croatian PEN Center in Zagreb and works at the Rijeka State Archives, managing its Library and Publishing Department.
