= Waltraut Schälike =

Soviet-Russian scientist (1927–2021)

- Born: Berlin
- Died: May 14, 2021
- Education: Candidate of Historical Sciences
- Alma mater: MSU Faculty of History
- Employer: Kyrgyz National University
- Website: www.wtschaelike.ru

Waltraut "Travka" Fritzevna Schälike (Russian: Вальтраут "Травка" Фрицевна Шелике; January 20, 1927 – May 14, 2021) was a Soviet-Russian scientist of German origin, historian and philosopher, author and publicist. She was a scholar of Marxism, PhD, Docent.

== Biography ==
Schälike was born in Berlin. Her father was Fritz Schälike. She graduated from MSU Faculty of History. She studied with Svetlana Alliluyeva.

From 1949 to 1988, she worked at the Kyrgyz National University.

From 1959 to 1969, she worked at the Osh State University.

She published in Kommunist, Voprosy Istorii, Izvestia. She is the author of books (in Russian) including «Исходные основания материалистического понимания истории» («Илим», 1991). She died in Moscow, aged 94.

== Works ==
- Schälike W. The Basic Foundations of the Materialistic Understanding of History: (Based on the works of K. Marx and F. Engels 1844–1846) (In Russian) Илим, 1991 ISBN 9785835503674
- Schälike W. Misunderstood Marx and Some Problems of Modernity (Part 3). Russian Journal of Philosophical Sciences. 2013;(5):120–130. (In Russ.)
- Shaelike W. In Search of the Beginning of Marx Materialistic Theory of History. Article II. Russian Journal of Philosophical Sciences. 2018;(2):20–43. (In Russ.) In Search of the Beginning of Marx Materialistic Theory of History. Article II
