= Pilip Ballach Ó Duibhgeannáin =

Pilip Ballach Ó Duibhgeannáin (fl. 1579–1590) was an Irish hereditary historian and member of Clan Ó Duibhgeannáin. The 20th-century historian, Paul Walsh, suggested that he was a son of Fer Caogad mac Ferghal Ó Duibhgeannáin, who died at Cloonybried in 1581. Ó Duibhgeannáin was a resident of Cloonybrien, County Roscommon.

Together Brian na Carriag MacDermot and others, he compiled the Annals of Lough Cé, Miscellanea Historica Hibernica, and other manuscripts.

== Miscellanea Historica Hibernica ==
Miscellanea Historica Hibernica, also known as MS G1, is a manuscript miscellany, a miniature vellum book. The commonplace book was compiled by Ó Duibhgeannáin during the years 1579 to 1584. It is described on the front endpaper as Miscellanea Historica Hibernica in a later hand. The book contains an Irish rendering of an extract from a Latin tract found in Roger Bacon's 13th century version of Secretum Secretorum on physiognomy.
