= Ali Tandilava =

Laz historian and philologist (1913–1985)

Ali Tandilava (Georgian: ალი თანდილავა; 28 November 1913, Sarpi, Russian Empire – 1985, Sarpi, Soviet Union), was a Laz historian and philologist known for his work on Laz people and Laz language. He is the author of the most comprehensive Laz-Georgian dictionary.

== Life ==
Tandilava was born in 1913 in Sarp village. Since there was no school providing education in Georgian in the village, he studied at a school providing education in Turkish until 1925. He moved to Georgia in 1928. He graduated from Tbilisi University, Faculty of East Caucasian Languages in 1941. He worked as a Georgian teacher and school principal in his native village from 1942-1949 and from 1952 until his retirement in 1973.

== Works ==
In the 1950s, together with Muhammed Vanilishi, he started to write a book in Georgian called Lazeti, which tells the history of the Laz people. The book, which was published in 1964, was translated into Turkish by Hayri Hayrioğlu under the name "History of Laz" in 1992.

Tandilava worked on the Laz-Georgian dictionary from 1949 until his death. The dictionary, which consists of 22,590 words and each word is used in a sentence, was edited by Merab Chukhua and published electronically in 2009. On the 100th anniversary of Ali Tandilava's birth, the dictionary prepared for publication by Merab Chukhua, Natela Kutelia, Lali Ezugbaia and Lile Tandilava. In addition to the works of Ali Tandilava, some folkloric-ethnographic books and words compiled from Laz textbooks were added to the book.
