= Kurt Pätzold =

German historian

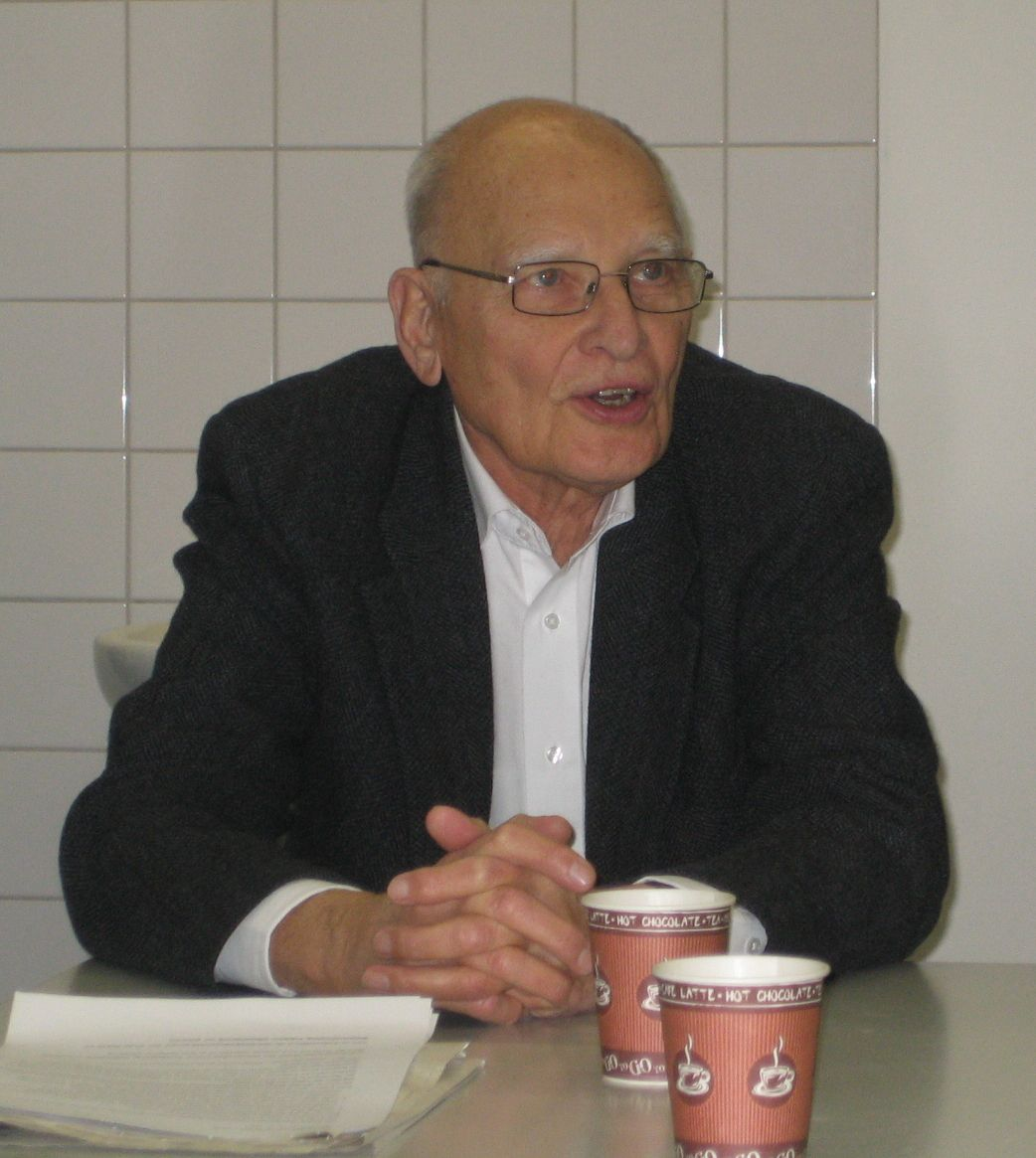
Kurt Pätzold in 2007

Kurt Pätzold (3 May 1930, in Wrocław – 18 August 2016, Berlin) was a German Marxist historian.

== Life ==
In 1945 Kurt Pätzold moved with his family to Thüringen (Turingia). From 1948 to 1953 he studied History, Philosophy, and Political Science at the University of Jena, where he wrote his dissertation on how the economic crisis affected the Carl Zeiss AG company and received his PhD. He attended HU Berlin University to receive his Doctor of Science and he specialized in "Antisemitism and the persecution of Jews (that occurred from 1933-1935). A study of the political strategies and tactics used by the fascist, German imperialism." After the "turning point" in Germany (where Germany was reunited, and which initiated the introduction of a parliamentary democracy), he was fired during a settlement lawsuit in 1992. The longtime leader of the Center for Antisemitism Research, Wolfgang Benz, described the procedure of Pätzold’s laying off as scandalous and unjust.

Younger, regime-critical historians such as Wolfram Brandes described Pätzold as a "true follower of the SED." (the Socialist Unity Party of Germany/ the East German Communist Party/ Marxist-Leninist political party). In 1946, he was already a member of the KPD (Communist party which later developed into the SED), for whom he also worked full-time at the University of Jena between 1954 and 1960. For two of these years, he worked as the Secretary of the SED-party. After the Friedliche Revolution ("the Peaceful Revolution" that led to the opening of East Germany’s borders with the west) in 1989, critical scientists and students accused Pätzold of actively participating in political persecution that occurred in 1956-1958 at the University of Jena, as well as 1968, 1971/1972 and 1976 at the Humboldt-University of Berlin. In 1990 he apologized for these acts. After the fall of the DDR (German Democratic Republic), Pätzold became a speaker for the left-leaning extremists, the Marxistischen Forums of the PDS (Democratic Socialist Party).

Pätzold often wrote for the "Junge Welt" (a political German newspaper) and was a member of the scientific advisory board of the Rosa-Luxemburg-Stiftung (a left-leaning political organization). His studies focused on the history of fascism and the NSDAP (National Socialist German Labor Party), the developments in the area of geschichtsrevisionismus (History revisionism) as well as the history of antisemitism and the persecution of Jews. Wolfgang Benz deemed Pätzold’s work "Fascism, Racial Madness and the Persecution of Jews" (1975)an "important representation of the Marxist Antisemitism and research of fascism." But also his studies on national socialism as the German version of fascism and on the history of the NSDAP are considerable research achievements. In addition to these, Pätzold entered uncovered territory and "offered new perspectives" with his biographical works on Adolf Hitler, Rudolf Hess, Julius Streicher, Adolf Eichmann and Franz Novak. Pätzold was "an important colleague" among the "materialistic-dialectical" oriented inner-circle and also for the historians guild in general.

As of 1996, Pätzold was a member of the Leibniz Society of Sciences in Berlin. He was the father of three kids. He died in August 2016 of cancer.

== Career ==
Kurt Pätzold moved to Thuringia in 1945 with his family. He studied History, Philosophy and Political Economy at the University of Jena from 1948 to 1953, where he received a PhD in 1963.

Pätzold wrote regularly for the Junge Welt and was an advisor to the Rosa Luxemburg Foundation. His research included the history of fascism, developments in the field of historical revisionism, and the history of anti-Semitism and the persecution of the Jews.

According to Wolfgang Benz, in his work Fascism, Racism, Persecution of the Jews (1975), he set an "important sign of Marxist research on anti-Semitism and fascism". Pätzold died of cancer in August 2016.
