= Ronald Suleski =

Ronald Suleski (born June 11, 1942) is a historian, anthropologist and author specializing in East Asia. He has been the longest serving president of the Asiatic Society of Japan, served on the National Committee on US-China Relations and associated with the Harvard University's East Asian research center. He is currently serving as the Director of the Rosenberg Institute at Suffolk University in Boston, Massachusetts, United States.

== Personal life and career ==
Suleski was born in Erie, Pennsylvania in 1942. He served in the United States Army from 1960 to 1966. He received his BA cum laude in Anthropology and Asian Studies from the University of Pittsburgh in 1966. He did his graduate work at the University of Michigan, where he received his MA in Chinese Studies in 1969, and his PhD in Modern Chinese History in 1974. He taught at the University of Texas at Arlington from 1974 to 1978.

In 1978-79 he was a Japan Foundation Fellow in Tokyo. He continued living in Japan for the next twenty years. He became an executive in international professional publishing. He worked for Pergamon Press, HarperCollins, and CCH-Commerce Clearing House, and continued to travel widely in Asia. He was a member of the Asiatic Society of Japan, founded in 1872, and served as president from 1987 to 1994. He was Provost of the Huron University Tokyo campus from 1995 to 1997.

He returned to the United States in 1997 and affiliated as an Associate in Research at the Fairbank Center for Chinese Studies, an affiliation which continues today. He was briefly at the Harvard-Yenching Institute, then became assistant director of the Fairbank Center in 2003 and served until 2008.

In 2009 he joined Suffolk University Boston as the first Director of the newly established Rosenberg Institute for East Asian Research and as Professor of History, where he continues serving.

He has published widely in English, Chinese, and Japanese, including The Fairbank Center for East Asian Research at Harvard University: A fifty-year history, 1955–2005. (Fairbank Center, 2005). His most recent book is Daily Life for the Common People of China, 1850 to 1950: Understanding Chaoben Culture (Brill, 2018).

== Awards and honours ==
- President - Asiatic Society of Japan
- Fellow – Japan Foundation

== Bibliography ==
Books and monographs:

- (1994) The modernization of Manchuria (ISBN 9-6220-1537-9) published by Chinese University Press.
- (2002) Civil Government in Warlord China: Tradition (ISBN 0-8204-5278-5) published by Peter Lang.
- (2018) Daily Life for the Common People of China, 1850–1950; Understanding Chaoben Culture. Leiden: Brill Publishers. 2018.
- (2012). Chinese edition of Civil government in warlord China: tradition, modernization and Manchuria. Appeared as: Zhang Zuolin he Wang Yongjiang: Beiyang zhengfu shidai de Fengtian zhengfu 張作霖 和 王永江: 北洋 軍閥時代的 奉天政府 [Zhang Zuolin and Wang Yongjiang: The Fengtian Government During the Beiyang Warlord Period]. Translated by Xi Youwei 徐有威. Beijing: Zhongyang bianyi chubanshe 中央編譯出 社 Central Compilation and Translation Bureau, 2012.
- (2012). Chinese Language Edition of The Fairbank Center for East Asian Research at Harvard University: A fifty-year history, 1955-2005 appeared as Hafu daxue Fei Zhengqing zhongxinwushinian shi 哈佛大學 費政情中心 50 年史 [The Fairbank Center at Harvard: A 50 Year History]. Translated by Lu Keli 路克利. Beijing: New Star Press 新星出版社, 2012.
- (2008). Korean Language Edition of The Fairbank Center for East Asian Research at Harvard University: A fifty-year history, 1955-2005 appeared as Habote daehak ui Dongashia yongu: chuigun oshipmnyon ui paljache하버드대학의 동아시아 연구: 최근 50년의 발자취[East Asian Research at Harvard University: Celebrating 50 Years]. Translated by Kim Songgyu김성규. Seoul: Hyonaksa현학사., 2008.
- (2008). Manshū no seishōnen zō 滿州の青少年像[Images of Japanese Youth in Manchuria].Aichi University Tōa dōbun shoin booklet #4. Toyohashi: Aichi University.
- (2005). The Fairbank Center for East Asian Research at Harvard University: A fifty-year history, 1955–2005. Cambridge, MA: Fairbank Center; (2008).
- (2002). Civil government in warlord China: tradition, modernization and Manchuria. New York: Peter Lang Publishing.
- (1994). The modernization of Manchuria: an annotated bibliography. Hong Kong: The Chinese University Press.
- (1982), with H. Masada. Affective expressions in Japanese: A handbook of value-laden words in everyday Japanese. Tokyo: The Hokuseido Press.
- (1971). Directory of Asian studies in secondary education. New York: National Committee on United States-China Relations.
- (1970). A Guide to some lesser known figures in modern China. Mimeographed by the Center for Chinese Studies, Ann Arbor, MI: University of Michigan.
- (1969). With Daniel Bays. Early communist China: two studies. Research monograph. Michigan Papers in Chinese Studies, No. 4. Ann Arbor, MI: University of Michigan, 1969.
