= Mahir Darziev =

Georgian politician

Mahir Darziyev
- მახირ დარზიევი
- Born: August 4, 1957 (age 68); Qazax, Azerbaijan SSR
- Occupations: Politician, historian and educator

Mahir Darziyev (Georgian: მახირ დარზიევი; born 4 August 1957, Qazax, Azerbaijan SSR, USSR) is a Georgian politician, historian and educator of Azerbaijani origin. He was a Member of the Parliament of Georgia for two terms in 2012 and 2016.

== Biography ==
In 1980 and 1981, he worked as a mechanic at Tbilisi and Rustavi water treatment stations.

In 1982, he served as a teacher of military affairs at the Rustavi high school. From 1982 to 1992, he worked as a history teacher at a school in Marneuli.

From 1991 to 2003, he taught at the Ganja State Pedagogical Institute. He was a member of Marneuli city council from 1998 to 2002. From 2012 to 2016 he was a deputy of the Georgian Parliament of the 8th convocation on the party list, electoral bloc: "Bidzina Ivanishvili—Georgian Dream". From 2016 to 2020 he was a deputy of the Parliament of the 9th Convocation of Georgia on the party list, electoral bloc: "Georgian Dream—Democratic Georgia".
