= Olival Freire Jr. =

Olival Freire Jr. (Jequié, 1954) is a physicist and historian of physics. He is Full Professor of Physics and History of Physics at the Universidade Federal da Bahia, former president of the Brazilian Society for the History of Science and president of the Commission for the History of Modern Physics, International Union of History and Philosophy of Science.

== Education and career ==
Freire Jr. studied electrical engineering for a year and a half at the Universidade Federal da Bahia (UFBA) before, impressed by the lectures of physicist Benedito Pepe, he switched to physics. He wrote his master's thesis with Amelia Hambuger on interpretations of quantum physics, in particular the interpretation by Vladimir Fock, and subsequently wrote his Ph.D. thesis with Michel Paty and Shozo Montoyama on David Bohm's approach to quantum mechanics.

He worked as post-doctoral researcher at the Université Paris VII, at Harvard University, and subsequently at the MIT.

Freire Jr. is Associate Professor and Researcher II UFBA in the History of Science. He is also president of the Brazilian Society for the History of Science and vice-president of the Commission for the History of Modern Physics, International Union of History and Philosophy of Science.

His current research covers especially also the history of science in Brazil.

== Awards and honors ==
In 2004, Freire Jr. was awarded a Senior Fellowship from the Dibner Institute for the History of Science and Technology, MIT, USA. In 2011, he was one of the winners of the Prêmio Jabuti in exact sciences for his book on Quantum theory: historical studies and cultural implications.

== Publications ==
- Olival Freire Jr.: "A story without an ending: the quantum physics controversy 1950–1970", Science & Education, vol. 12, pp. 573–586, 2003
- Olival Freire Jr.: "Science and Exile: David Bohm, the Hot Times of the Cold War, and His Struggle for a New Interpretation of Quantum Mechanics", Historical Studies on the Physical and Biological Sciences, vol. 36, no. 1, 2005, pp. 31–35
- Olival Freire: David Bohm e a controvérsia dos quanta. Coleção CLE, Volume 27. Campinas : UNICAMP, Centro de Lógica, Epistemologia e História da Ciência, 1999, 244 p. ISSN 0103-3247
- Olival Freire Jr.: "David Bohm e as controvérsias do mundo dos Quanta". Ciência Hoje, março de 2001, p. 35
- Olival Freire Jr.: L'interprétation de la mécanique quantique selon Paul Langevin, La Pensée, 1993 (Interpretation of Quantum Mechanics according to Paul Langevin).
- Olival Freire Jr.: The quantum dissidents: rebuilding the foundations of quantum mechanics (1950-1990). Springer, 2014.
