= Luise Gerbing =

German historian

Luise Gerbing (April 23, 1855 – February 25, 1927, in Waltershausen) was a German historian, specialising in the history of the Thuringian Forest, and the history of human migration and folklore in Thuringia.
