= Kwok Kin Poon =

Dr. Kwok Kin Poon (潘國鍵, 1949– ) was born in Guangdong, China. He is a historian, a teacher, a Chinese calligrapher as well as a columnist. He studied under the renowned Chinese historian, Keng-wang Yen (嚴耕望), at the Chinese University of Hong Kong (CUHK) in the seventies, and eventually obtained his B.A., M.Phil. degrees, as well as a Diploma in Education from the CUHK. Subsequently, he obtained his M.A. and Ph.D. degrees from the University of Hong Kong, and a M.Ed. degree from the University of Toronto. One of his major contributions to the studies of Chinese history is his book The Northern Wei State and Juan-juan Nomadic Tribe《北魏與蠕蠕關係研究》.

Aside from his academic achievements, Dr. Poon has studied and practiced Chinese calligraphy for more than sixty years. At the age of 18, he won the first prize in the Hong Kong Chinese Calligraphy Open Competition in 1967. Between 1986 and 1988, Dr. Poon held his first series of Chinese calligraphy exhibitions in Hong Kong and in Toronto. His calligraphic works has been extensively catalogued in A Collection of Kwok Kin Poon's Calligraphy《潘國鍵書法集》published in 2019.

Dr. Poon was also an active columnist in the Chinese media both in Hong Kong and Toronto. He wrote for the Hong Kong newspaper Wah Kiu between 1984 and 1987, the Hong Kong newspaper Ming Pao between 1992 and 1995, the Canadian newspaper Ming Pao between 1997 and 2002, and the Canadian newspaper Singtao between 2003 and 2005. His articles have been archived in a five-volume series, A Collection of Kwok Kin's Newspaper Columns 《國鍵文集》, published in 2019.

In 2018, along with his son KS Vincent Poon, he published the line-by-line English translation of A Narrative on Calligraphy by Sun Guoting 《英譯書譜》, an important document in the study of the art of Chinese calligraphy. A revised version has since been published in 2019 along with other publications. In 2020, along with his son KS Vincent Poon, he published the line-by-line English translation of Laozi's Tao Te Ching.

== Education ==
- BA – 1971 The Chinese University of Hong Kong (CUHK)
- MPh – 1973 CUHK
- DipEd – 1976 CUHK
- MA – 1980 University of Hong Kong (HKU)
- PhD – 1983 HKU
- MEd – 1990 OISE, University of Toronto, Canada

== Chinese calligraphy exhibitions ==
- Exhibition of Chinese Calligraphy by Kwok Kin POON 1986, Hong Kong.
- Exhibition of Chinese Calligraphy and Painting by Kwok Kin POON and His Students 1987, Hong Kong.
- Exhibition of Chinese Calligraphy and Painting by Kwok Kin POON and His Students in Toronto 1988, Toronto Canada.

== Publications ==
=== Articles ===
- "On Chinese Calligraphy", New Asia Life, Vol. 11, Hong Kong, 1968, pp. 3656–3657.
- "The Decree of Heaven and Struggle for Power", New Asia Life, Vol. 13, Hong Kong, 1971, pp. 4427–4429.
- "On the Duties of Historians", New Asia Life, Vol.14, Hong Kong, 1971, pp. 4628–4630.
- "A Study on the Age of Hsuan-zhuang's Travel to the West in Tang Dynasty", Journal by the History Department Society of New Asia College (CUHK), Vol. 2, Hong Kong, 1972, pp. 29–46.
- "Mr. Tse Hay and His Chinese Calligraphy", the Education Col., Wah Kiu Newspapers, Hong Kong, Jan. 4&5, 1984.
- "An Introduction to Chinese Calligraphy", the Education Col., Wah Kiu Newspapers, Hong Kong, Mar. 4, 1986.
- "Chinese Calligraphy and Chinese Education", the Education Col., Wah Kiu Newspapers, Hong Kong, June 15–20,25,29, and July 8,13, 1987.
- "A Biography of Mr. Tse Hay and His Achievement in Chinese Calligraphy", Vol. 6, Shu Pu, Hong Kong, 1988, pp. 36–37.
- "A Critique on Current Hong Kong Education Issues", the Education Col., Wah Kiu Newspapers, Hong Kong, Nov. 1988 onwards.
- "The Puzzle of A Modern University", the Education Col., Wah Kiu Newspapers, Hong Kong, Feb. 1990.
- Ming Pao Newspapers, Columns, Hong Kong, 1992 – 1995.
- Ming Pao Newspapers, Columns, Canada, 1997 – 2002.
- Singtao Newspapers, Columns, Canada, 2003 – 2005.
- "Teaching and Calligraphy: My afterthoughts after reading Collection of Ch'ien Mu's letters", New Asia Life, May 2015, Hong Kong, 2015, pp. 20–21.

=== Books ===
- Laozi's Tao Te Ching: The Correct Interpretation and Translation in Vernacular Chinese《老子 道德經 正解並白話對譯 》, Toronto: The SenSeis, 2020.
- An English Translation and the Correct Interpretation of Laozi's Tao Te Ching 《英譯並正解老子道德經: 附 道德經 艱深句子正解並白話對譯 》, Toronto: The SenSeis, 2020.
- A Collection of Kwok Kin Poon's Calligraphy 《潘國鍵書法集》, Toronto: The SenSeis, 2019.
- English Translation of Classical Chinese Calligraphy Masterpieces 《英譯法書》 by KS Vincent Poon & Kwok Kin Poon, Toronto: The SenSeis, 2019.
- The Vernacular Chinese Translation of Sun Guoting's A Narrative on Calligraphy 《孫過庭書譜白話對譯》, Toronto: The SenSeis, 2019.
- A Narrative on Calligraphy by Sun Guoting Revised and Enhanced Edition 《英譯書譜》 by KS Vincent Poon & Kwok Kin Poon, Toronto: The SenSeis, 2019.
- Writings on my journey towards faith《寫在信仰荊途上》, Toronto: The SenSeis, 2019.
- A Collection of Kwok Kin's Newspaper Columns 《國鍵文集》, Toronto: The SenSeis, 2019.
- At my 60's 《年在耳順》, Toronto: The SenSeis, 2019.
- A Study on Northern Zhou's Territories 《北周疆域考 (手稿)》, Toronto: The SenSeis, 2019.
- A Study on the Ethnicity of Tuyuhun and Chinese historical documentations on the tribal formation of Tuyuhun and its early history 《吐谷渾種裔及其成族與初期歷史 (手稿)》, Toronto: The SenSeis, 2019.
- The Northern Wei State and Juan-juan Nomadic Tribe 《北魏與蠕蠕關係研究》, Taiwan: Commercial Press, 1988.
- An Exhibition of Chinese Calligraphy by Poon Kwok Kin, Hong Kong: Magnanimous Studio, 1986.
- An Exhibition of Chinese Calligraphy by Kwok Kin Poon and His Students, Hong Kong: Magnanimous Studio, 1987.

=== Selected unpublished thesis ===
- "A Study on the Teaching Method of Chinese History", DipEd dissertation, CUHK, 1976.
- "Northern Chou's Relations with the Nomadic Tribes in the North-West", MA dissertation, HKU, 1980.
- "Mistakes in Some of the Geographical Narrations in the Historical Records of Chou and Sui Dynasties", 1989.
