= Yefim Gorodetsky =

Soviet historian (1907–1993)

Efim Naumovich Gorodetsky
- Городецкий Ефим Наумович
- Yefim Gorodetsky
- Born: 29 January [O.S. 16 January] 1907; Vinnitsa, Podolia Governorate, Russian Empire (now Vinnytsia, Ukraine)
- Died: 20 June 1993 (aged 86); Moscow, Russia
- Citizenship: Russia/Soviet Union
- Occupation: Historian
- Known for: Historiography of the October Revolution
- Spouse: Polina Veniaminovna Gurovich
- Children: Evgenii Gorodetskii
- Awards: State Prize of the USSR (1943)

Academic background
- Education: Moscow State University

Academic work
- School or tradition: Soviet
- Institutions: Moscow State University
- Notable works: Rozhdenie sovetskogo gosudarstva 1917-1918 gg (1965)

Efim Naumovich Gorodetsky (or Gorodetskii; Russian: Городецкий Ефим Наумович; 29 January 1907 – 20 June 1993) was a Soviet historian and a leading authority on the historiography of the October Revolution and the formation of the Soviet state. He received his advanced education at Moscow State University (MSU) where he also taught. He was awarded the State Prize of the USSR in 1943 for his part in a history of the Russian Civil War and produced and edited a number of collections of primary sources relating to Russian and Soviet history.

He was associated with Eduard Burdzhalov and Isaak Mints at MSU, and in the late 1940s was one of the historians at the university who was attacked by Arkadiĭ Sidorov as one of what Joseph Stalin described as "rootless cosmopolitans", most of whom were Jewish intellectuals. His career flourished in the post-Stalin period and in 1960 he won the N. V. Lomonosov Prize of MSU, also receiving a doctorate there in 1965, and publishing a number of books such as the highly cited Rozhdenie sovetskogo gosudarstva 1917-1918 gg (1965) on the birth of the Soviet state.

In 1987, he was interviewed in Voprosy Istorii on the 80th anniversary of his birth, and in 1997, Russian History published an article titled "Lessons from Gorodetsky (on the occasion of his 90th birthday)".

== Early life and family ==
Efim Gorodetsky was born on 29 January 1907 in Vinnitsa, Podolsk province, Ukraine. He studied at the Ethnological Department of Moscow State University (MSU) from 1928 to 1930.

He married Polina Veniaminovna Gurovich, also a historian, and they had sons, the physicist Evgenii Gorodetskii (1941-2015) and his brother Alexander, and a daughter Inna.

== Career ==
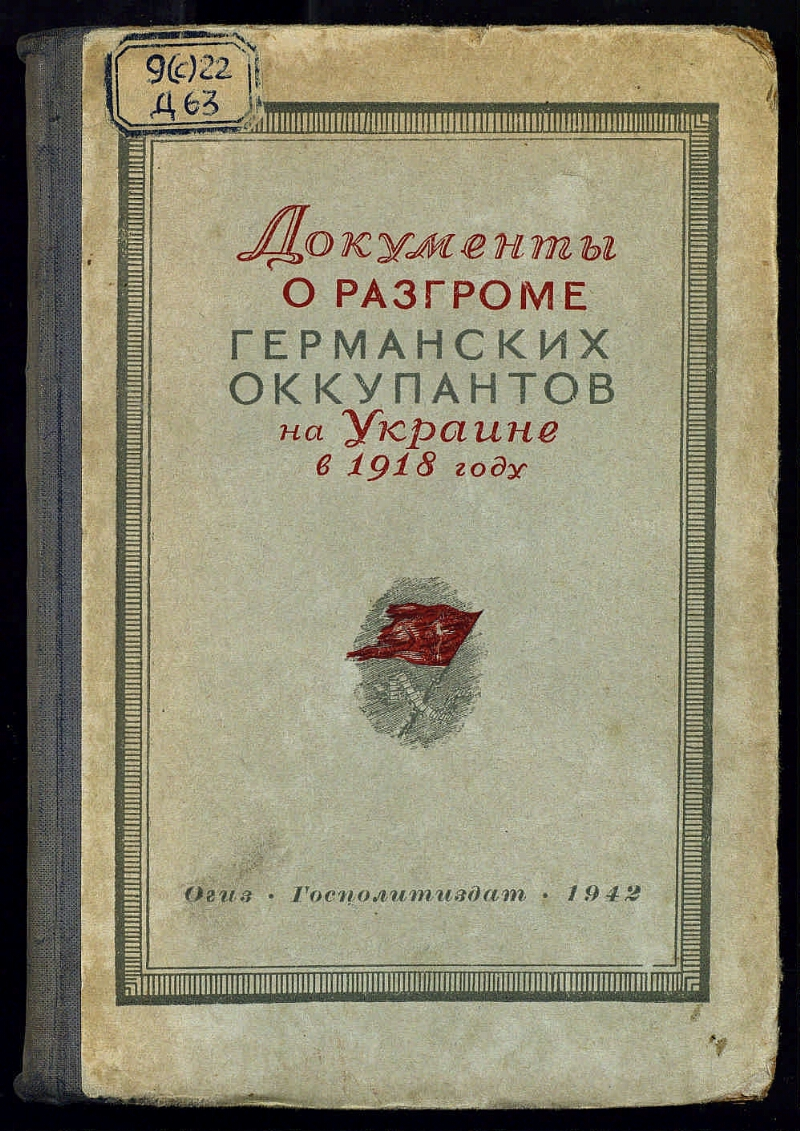
Documents on the Defeat of the German Occupation in the Ukraine in 1918 (1942). Edited by Gorodetsky and I. I. Mints.

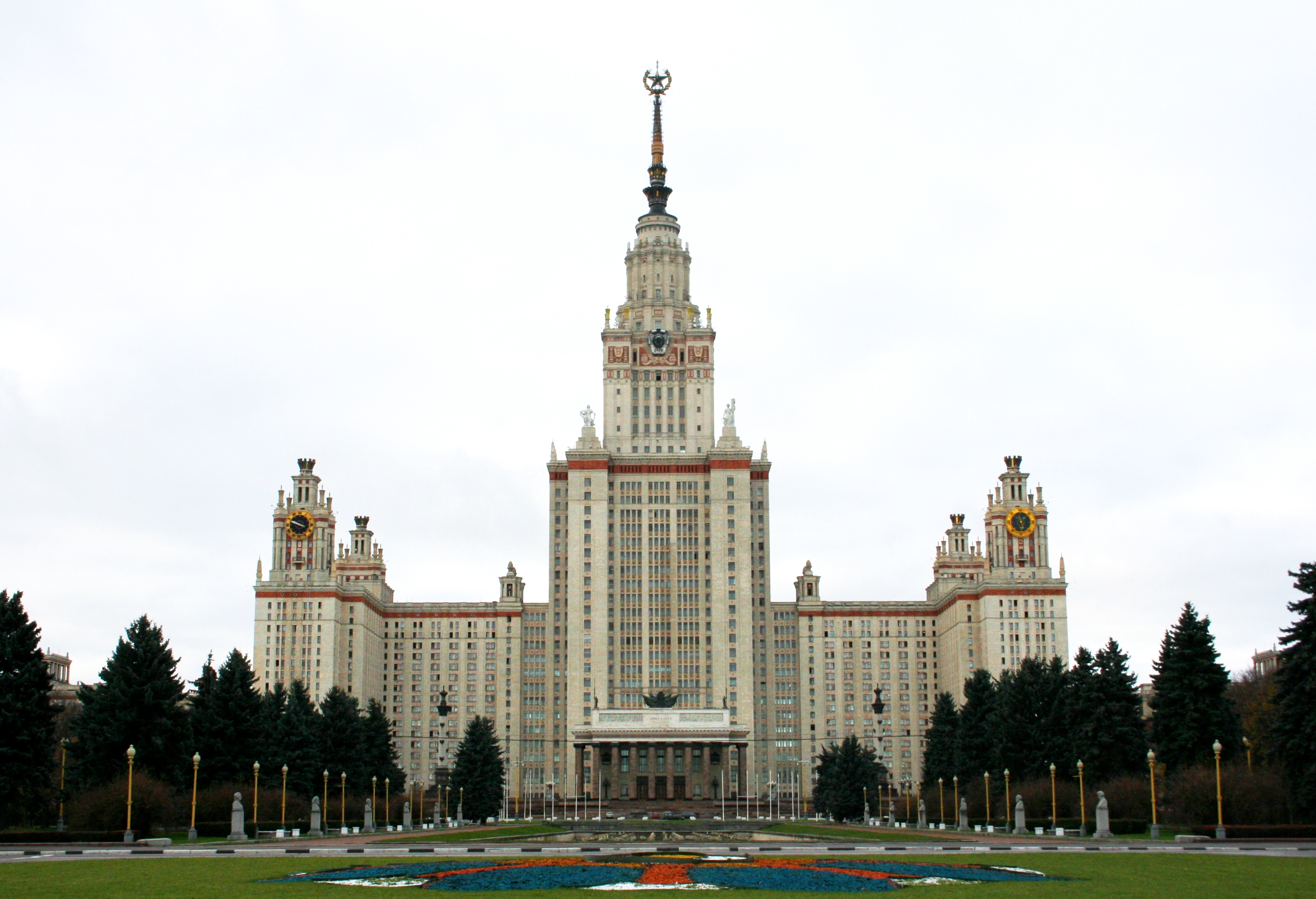
Moscow State University

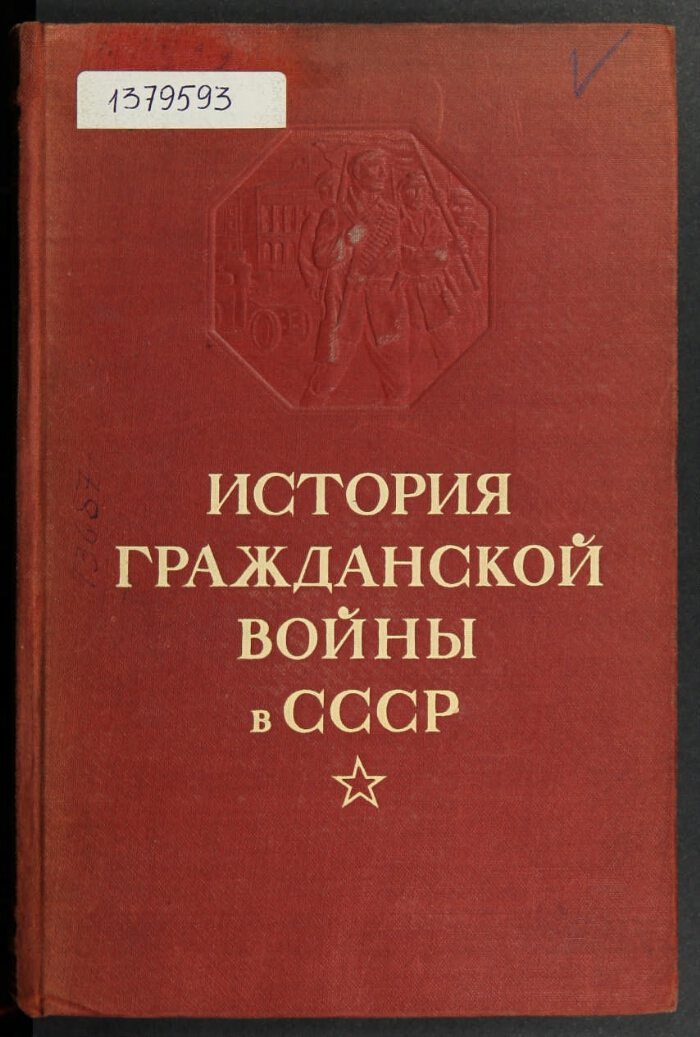
The History of the Civil War in the USSR. Vol. 2 The Great Proletarian Revolution (1942) for his part in which Gorodetsky received the State Prize of the USSR in 1943.

Gorodetsky worked as a historian for the Communist Party of the Soviet Union and at the Moscow Institute of Philosophy, Literature, and History (MIFLI/МИФЛИ) in 1932 and 1933 after the Humanities faculty of MSU was abolished. MIFLI, which aimed to produce teachers with an explicitly Marxist-Leninist approach, was subsequently merged back into MSU when the Humanities were reintroduced to the university.

In 1940, he was appointed associate professor of the Department of History of the USSR of the Soviet Period, in the Faculty of History of Moscow State University and in 1943 he was awarded the State Prize of the USSR for his contributions to Volume 2 (1942) of the history of the Russian Civil War. During the Second World War, he and his family were evacuated to Krasnoufimsk in the Ural region to escape the approaching Germans, returning in 1944.

In the late 1940s, Gorodetsky, a Jew, was one of the historians that Arkadiĭ Sidorov campaigned against as part of Joseph Stalin's drive against the "rootless cosmopolitans", most of whom were Jewish intellectuals. Sidorov criticised Gorodetsky, Édourd Burdzhalov, Isaak Mints, Nikolai Rubinshtein, and others he described as the "Mints group" for denying the central role of the Soviet people in determining their own path, as lacking in patriotism, and as acting as tools of the enemies of the people. He claimed that the historical approach of the group, of which he described Gorodetsky as a "patron" ("покровитель"), had become dominated by bourgeois objectivism, was too fact-based, lacking in partisanship, and emphasised international proletarian activity over domestic activity, the last of which had, however, until recently been party orthodoxy.

After Stalin's death in 1953, the norms of historical scholarship began to reassert themselves, with a push by Soviet historians in the rest of the decade to eradicate the "falsifications" and "distortions" of the last years of his rule. In 1960, Gorodetsky won the N. V. Lomonosov Prize of Moscow State University for his part in producing the history of the revolutionary and state activities of V. I. Lenin. He received his doctorate in history from MSU in 1965 and wrote three books by 1970 and edited a fourth, including his work on the historiography of the October Revolution, about which he was a leading authority, and his highly cited Rozhdenie sovetskogo gosudarstva 1917-1918 gg on the birth of the Soviet state in 1917-1918 (1965). Reviewer Rudolf Schlesinger felt that, notwithstanding the central and approving place that the author gave to Lenin, in the book Gorodetsky had taken an undogmatic and fresh approach different from his contemporaries in either the West or the Soviet Union.

== Later life ==
In 1987, Gorodetsky received the traditional interview in Voprosy Istorii on the 80th anniversary of his birth. It was translated into English and published in Soviet Studies in History (now Russian Studies in History) in 1988. He died in Moscow on 20 June 1993. In 1997, an article by V. S. Lelchuk was published in Russian History titled "Lessons from Gorodetsky (on the occasion of his 90th birthday)".

== Selected publications ==
=== Articles ===
- "Soviet reform of the higher school in 1918 and Moscow University", Vestnik moskovskogo universiteta, 1954, No. 1 (social science series).
- "Iz istorii oktiabr'skogo vooruzhennogo vosstannia i II vserossiiskogo s''ezda sovetov", Voprosy istorii, 1957, No. 10, pp. 23–48.
- "Demobilizatsiya armii v 1917-8 gg", Istoriya SSSR, No. 1, 1958.
- "Voprosy metodologii istoricheskogo issledovaniia v posleoktiabrskikh trudakh V. I. Lenina," Voprosy istorii, 1963, No. 6, p. 32.
- "Contemporary Soviet Literature on the October Revolution", Istoriya SSSR, 1977, No. 6.

=== Books ===
- Dokumenty o Razgrome Germanskykh Okupantov na Ukraine v 1918 Gody. (Documents on the Defeat of the German Occupation in the Ukraine in 1918) OGIZ, Moscow, 1942. (Edited with Isaak Mints)
- История Гражданской войны в СССР T. 2 Великая пролетарская революция. (The History of the Civil War in the USSR. Vol. 2 The Great Proletarian Revolution) Moscow, 1942. (Joint)
- Из истории Московского университета. 1917–1941. (From the history of Moscow University. 1917–1941) Moscow, 1955. (Editor)
- Sverdlov: Zhizn' i deiatel'nost'. (Sverdlov: Life and work) Gosizdat, Moscow, 1961. (With Yuri P. Sharapov)
- Velikaia obtiabr'skaia sotsialisticheskaia revoliutsiia: Bibliograficheskii ukazatel' dokumental'nykh publikatsii. (The Great October Socialist Revolution: A Bibliographical Index of Documentary Publications) Moscow, 1961. (Editor)
- Rozhdenie sovetskogo gosudarstva 1917-1918 gg. (The Birth of the Soviet State 1917–1918) Nauka, Moscow, 1965.
- Lenin onovopolozhnik sovetskoi istoricheskoi nauki: Istoriia sovetskogo obshchestva v trudakh V.I. Lenina. (Lenin is the founder of Soviet historical science: the history of Soviet society in the works of V. I. Lenin) Nauka, Moscow, 1970.
- Sverdlov. 1885-1919. Life and activity. Life of Great People No. 501. Young Guard, Moscow, 1971. (With Yuri P. Sharapov)
- Stroitel'stvo sovetskogo gosudarstva: Sbornik statei k 70-letiiu E.B. Genkinoi. (The construction of the Soviet state: Collection of articles on the 70th anniversary of E.V. Genkina) Nauka, Moscow, 1972. (Editor)

== See also ==
- Doctors' plot
