= Arkady Sidorov =

Russian historian (1900–1966)

- Born: Arkady Lavrovich Sidorov; 8 February [O.S. 27 January] 1900; Pochinki, Nizhny Novgorod province, Russian Empire
- Died: 11 March 1966 (aged 66); Moscow, Soviet Union
- Occupation: Historian

Academic background
- Education: Moscow State University
- Thesis: Экономика России в годы Первой мировой войны 1914–1917 гг. ('The Russian Economy during the First World War of 1914–1917')

Academic work
- Era: Soviet
- Discipline: Economic history, history of communism
- School or tradition: Marxist
- Institutions: Moscow State University

Arkady Lavrovich Sidorov (8 February [O.S. 27 January] 1900 – 11 March 1966) was a Russian Soviet historian. A member of the Communist Party from an early age, he was educated as a political activist and did party work before serving in the Second World War during which he was wounded. He started an academic career in Moscow and received his doctorate from Moscow State University (MSU) where he also taught before joining the Institute of History of the Academy of Sciences of the USSR of which he became director.

He campaigned against the MSU professor and Jewish academician Isaak Mints during Joseph Stalin's antisemitic drive against the "rootless cosmopolitans" as a result of which Mints lost most of his academic positions. The zeal with which Sidorov opposed Mints was remembered when a position became vacant for a corresponding member of the USSR Academy of Sciences and Sidorov was not elected.

He edited Istoricheskie zapiski and was on the editorial board of the Great Soviet Encyclopedia and the Soviet Historical Encyclopedia. He was instrumental in the publication of 18 volumes of documents on the 1905–1907 Revolution and ten volumes on the October Revolution of 1917.

He researched the development of capitalism in Russia which he concluded had developed largely independently of the rest of Europe, and is considered to have been the father of a new direction in Soviet historiography.

== Early life and education ==
Arkady Sidorov was born in Pochinki, Lukoyanovsky district, Gorky, now Nizhny Novgorod province, on 27 January (8 February) 1900. He became a member of the Communist Party of the Soviet Union in 1920 and attended institutions of higher education specifically intended to provide a Marxist training, graduating from the Sverdlov Communist University in 1923 and from the Institute of Red Professors in 1928. He published anti-Menshevik and anti-socialist revolutionary views in the press.

== Career ==
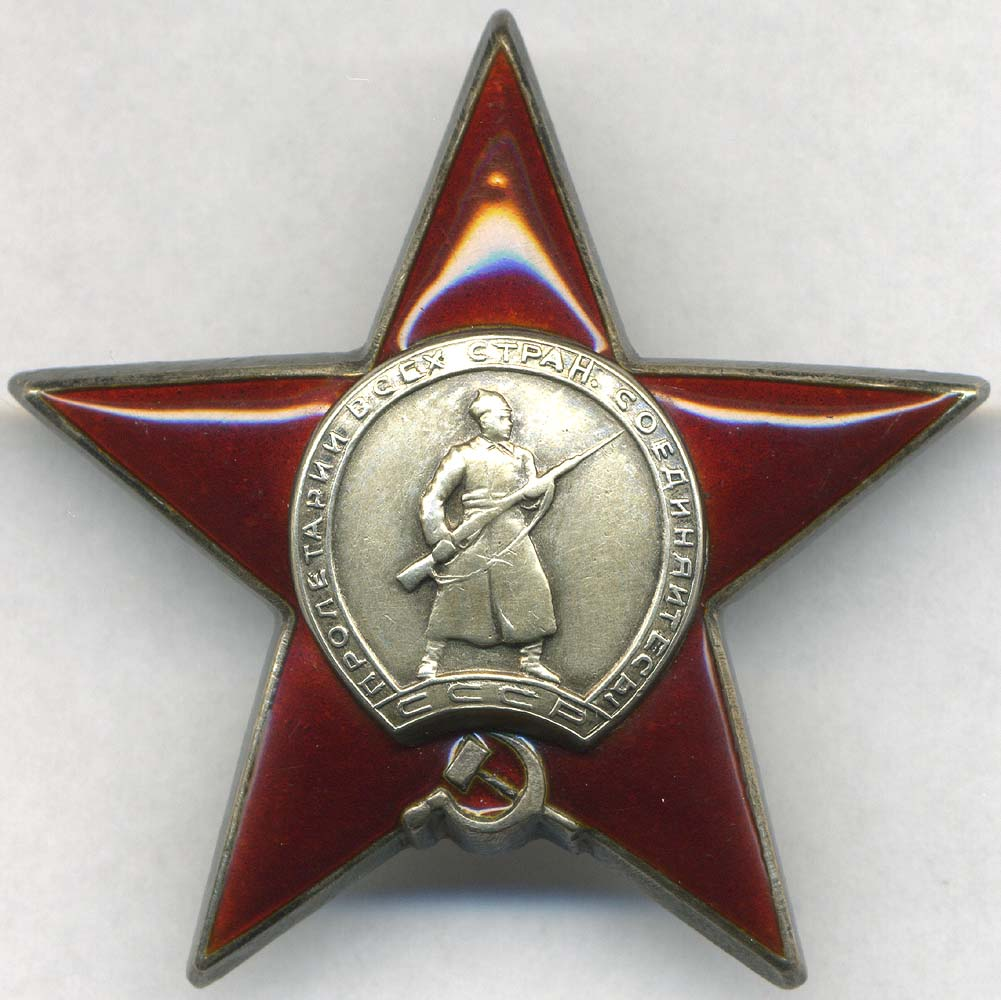
Order of the Red Star (obverse)

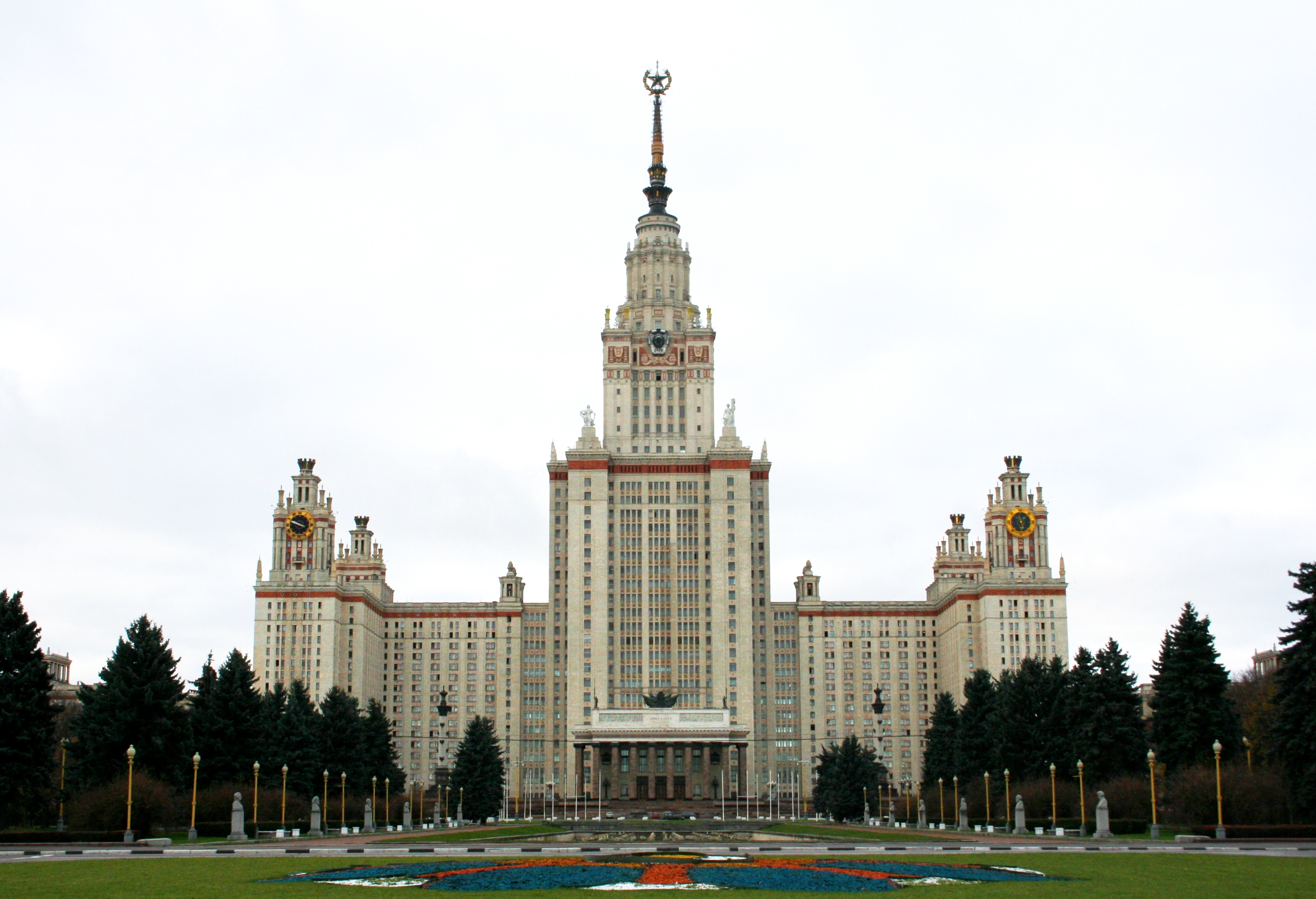
Moscow State University

Building on his training as an activist at the Sverdlov Communist University, Sidorov worked for the Communist party in Nizhny Novgorod, Vladivostok, and Khabarovsk from 1929 to 1936. In 1935 he was expelled from the party, but reinstated in 1936 and went to work on the journal Istorik-Marksist (Marxist Historian). He taught at the Moscow City Pedagogical Institute, Moscow State University (MGU), and the Military-Political Academy, and worked at the Institute of History of the Academy of Sciences of the USSR from 1937 to 1941.

In 1941, during the Second World War, Sidorov fought in the Moscow people's militia and was wounded. He was awarded the orders of the Red Star in 1942 and of the Patriotic War in 1944. In 1942 he was sent to work for the Commission on the History of the Great Patriotic War. He acquired his doctorate in history from MGU in 1943 for a thesis titled "The Russian Economy during the First World War of 1914–1917". He was a professor at Moscow State Institute of International Relations from 1945 to 1949 and worked at the Bolshevik party school from 1946.

In 1947, Sidorov wrote a column for the Bolshevik newspaper Культура и жизнь (Culture and Life) attacking the lectures of the Jewish MGU professor and academician Isaak Mints who, at that time, was a dominant figure in the teaching of Soviet history. Sidorov's attack on Mints coincided with Joseph Stalin's thinly veiled antisemitic campaign against the "rootless cosmopolitans" who were characterised as lacking in patriotism, holding ideologically incorrect views, and not ethnically Russian. Sidorov's supporters tended to be from a party activist or ex-military background that contrasted with the more traditional academic background of the alleged "cosmopolitans", many of whom were Jewish. In addition to Mints's circle, Sidorov attacked Eduard Burdzhalov, whose wife was Jewish, and the Jewish historians Nikolai Rubinshtein and E. N. Gorodetskii. Following a sustained campaign by Sidorov, Mints lost most of his academic positions by 1949 while Sidorov continued to receive advancement.

He was vice-rector for humanities at Moscow State University from 1948 to 1952, where he taught a course on Russian imperialism. From 1949 to 1959, he became head of the department of Soviet history at MGU. He was deputy director (1952) and then director (1953–59) of the Institute of History of the Academy of Sciences of the USSR.

From 1954 he was the editor of Istoricheskie zapiski in succession to Boris Grekov and he was on the editorial board of the Great Soviet Encyclopedia and the Soviet Historical Encyclopedia. He was instrumental in the publication of 18 volumes of documents on the 1905–07 Revolution and ten volumes on the October Revolution of 1917.

Sidorov failed, however, to be elected a corresponding member of the Academy of Sciences of the USSR, despite a space being made available for him, a result that V. V. Tikhonov in 2011 and Isaak Mints in his diary attributed to Sidorov having made too many enemies through his past ideological zeal but that Sidorov blamed on Mints blocking him from the position.

== Research ==
Sidorov's research was into the history of capitalism in Russia which he concluded had developed largely independently of the rest of Europe without the help of foreign investment. As such it included elements native to capitalism, such as monopolies, but also elements of pre-capitalist structures native to Russia. He is considered to have been the father of a new direction in Soviet historiography.

== Death and legacy ==
Sidorov died on 11 March 1966. He received an obituary from his former student, Pavel Volobuev, in Istoriia SSSR, a journal of the Institute of History of the Academy of Sciences of the USSR.

== Selected publications ==
=== Articles ===
- "Экономическая программа Октября и дискуссия с «левыми коммунистами»", Пролетарская революция. Vol. 6 (1929), No. 11.
- "Nekotorye razmyshleniya o trude i opyte istorika", Istoriya SSSR, 1964, No. 3.
- "Последний временщик последнего царя", Вопросы истории. Vol. 10–11 (1965), No. 1-2.

=== Books ===
- Russko-yaponskaya voyna. Pervaya burzhuazno-demokraticheskaya revolyutsiya v Rossii: 1905–1907 gg. (Russian-Japanese war. The first bourgeois-democratic revolution in Russia: 1905–1907) 1951.
- Finansovoe polozhenie Rossii v gody mirovoi voiny (1914–1917). (The financial situation of Russia during the First World War (1914–1917) Moscow, 1960.
- Istoricheskie predposylki Velikoi Oktiabr’skoi sotsialisticheskoi revoliutsii. (Historical background of the Great October Socialist Revolution) Moscow, 1970.
- Ekonomicheskoe polozhenie Rossii v gody pervoi mirovoi voiny. (The economic situation of Russia during the First World War) Moscow, 1973.
