= Igor Shaskolsky =

Russian medievalist and economic historian (1918–1995)

Igor Pavlovich Shaskol'skii
- Born: 31 October 1918; Petrograd, Soviet Russia (now St. Petersburg)
- Died: 21 April 1995 (aged 76); Saint Petersburg, Russia
- Known for: Research into Russian trade through the Baltic; Promoting the use of historical archives

Academic background
- Education: Leningrad State University; Academy of Sciences, Saint Petersburg
- Thesis: Столбовский мир 1617 г. и торговые отношения России со Шведским государством в первой половине XVII в. (The Stolbovo Peace of 1617 and Russia's trade relations with the Swedish state in the first half of the 17th century) (1965)

Academic work
- Discipline: Economic history
- School or tradition: Soviet
- Institutions: Saint Petersburg University

Igor Pavlovich Shaskol'skii or Shaskolsky (Russian: Игорь Павлович Шаскольский; 31 October 1918 – 25 April 1995) was a Russian medievalist and economic historian who was a specialist in Russian relations and trade with the Baltic provinces and Scandinavia in the medieval and early-modern periods.

Early in his life he was present during the Siege of Leningrad and subsequently worked at various Soviet state-sponsored institutions. He was a part-time lecturer at Saint Petersburg University and a corresponding member of the Saint Petersburg Institute of History and its predecessors. He challenged the established Soviet positions on the origins of the Rus' and trade through the Baltic, and was instrumental in the wider dissemination of primary source material.

== Early life and education ==
Igor Shaskol'skii was born in Saint Petersburg in 1918. He graduated from Leningrad State University (LSU), now Saint Petersburg State University, in 1941. In 1941–42 he was present during the siege of Leningrad by the Germans during the Second World War and helped to build defensive structures. He was evacuated in 1942 due to illness.

In 1947 he produced a thesis for LSU on the struggle of Novgorod with Sweden and Norway in the 13th century.

== Career ==
At the end of the 1940s, Shaskol'skii was teaching at a Communist Party school and working for a Karelian-Finnish branch of the USSR Academy of Sciences in Petrozavodsk, after which he worked at the State Museum of the History of Religion in Saint Petersburg. From 1956 to 1995 he worked at the Academy of Sciences in Saint Petersburg and was a part-time lecturer at Saint Petersburg University (LSU) from 1951 to 1986.

In 1965 he defended his doctoral thesis before the Academy of Sciences in Saint Petersburg on the subject of the 1617 Treaty of Stolbovo and trade relations between Russia and the Swedish state in the first half of the 17th century.

He was a corresponding member of what is today known as the Saint Petersburg Institute of History.

Shaskol'Skii specialised in the history of Russian relations and trade with the Baltic and Scandinavia in the medieval and early-modern periods, particularly trade and diplomatic relations with Sweden. He also addressed the Normanist theory that proposed that the origins of the Rus' were Norman, and therefore Scandinavian, taking a nuanced position that broadly accepted the anti-Normanism endorsed by Soviet historiography but also acknowledged that there was primary evidence for parts of the Normanist position. The theory was historically controversial because of disputed evidence and politically controversial because it dealt with questions of national identity. His book, Normanskaia teoriia v sovremennoi burzhuaznoi nauke (Norman theory in modern bourgeois science) was published in 1965 and also dealt with the history of the Varangian controversy.

He was instrumental in the wider dissemination of primary source material from archives through his work on editorial boards and wrote many articles that made extensive use of primary sources.

== Death and legacy ==
Shaskol'skii died in Saint Petersburg in 1995. His masterwork, Ekonomicheskie otnosheniia Rossii i Shvedskogo gosudarstva v XVII v. (Economic Relations between Russia and the Swedish State in the Seventeenth Century), was published posthumously in 1998 and represented the culmination of his research into Russian trade in the Baltic in the 17th and early 18th centuries. In the book he showed that the accepted Soviet position that the trade went mainly through Arkhangelsk on the northern coast, due to the blocking effect of the Swedish Baltic provinces, was wrong and in fact Russian trade in the Baltic was strong.

In 2018, a collection of essays on Saint Petersburg and Sweden in the 17th and 18th centuries, edited by P. V. Sedov, was published in Saint Petersburg to mark the 100th anniversary of Shaskol'skii's birth.

== Selected publications ==
=== Articles ===
- "Bor’ba shvedskikh krestonostsev protiv finliandii XII—XIV veka", Istoricheskii zhurnal, No. 4–5 (1940), pp. 102–12.
- "Dogovory Novgoroda s Norvegiei", Istoricheskie zapiski, T. 14 (1945), pp. 45–61.
- "Byla li Rossiia posle Livonskoi voiny otrezana ot Baltiiskogo moria", in Istoricheskie zapiski, Vol. XXXV (1950).
- "СКАНДИНАВСКИЙ СБОРНИК" (Scandinavian Collection), Voprosy Istorii, No. 12 (December 1959), pp. 159–166.
- "Ustroistvo shvedskikh gostinykh dvorov v gorodakh Rossii posle Stolbovskogo mira 1617 g.", Skandinavskii sbornik, Vol. 10 (1965).
- "Torgovlya Rossii s Pribaltikoi i Zapadnoi Evropoi v XVII v.", Skandinavskii sbornik, Vol. 11 (1966).
- "Vosstanovlenie russkoi torgovli so shvedskimi vladeniyami v pervye gody posle Stolbovskogo mira", Skandinavskii sbornik, Vol. 11 (1966).

=== Books ===
- Borʹba russkogo naroda za nevskie berega. (The struggle of the Russian people over the Neva coast) Voenizdat, Moscow, 1940.
- Shvedskaya interventsiya v Karelii v nachale XVII v. (Swedish intervention in Karelia at the beginning of the 17th-century) Gos. izd-vo Karelo-Finskoĭ SSR, Petrozavodsk, 1950.
- Stolbovskii mir 1617 g. i torgovye otnosheniia Rossii so Shvedskim gosudarstvom (The Peace of Stolbovo of 1617 and trade relationships between Russia and Sweden). Izdatel'stvo Nauka, 1964.
- Normanskaia teoriia v sovremennoi burzhuaznoi nauke. (Norman theory in modern bourgeois science) Moscow and Leningrad, 1965.
- Borʹba Rusi protiv krestonosnoĭ agressii na beregakh Baltiki v XII-XIII vv. (The struggle of Russia against the crusader aggression on the shores of the Baltic in the XII-XIII centuries) Nauka, Leningrad, 1978.
- Borʹba Rusi za sokhranenie vykhoda k Baltiĭskomu mori︠u︡ v XIV veke. (The struggle of Russia to maintain access to the Baltic Sea in the XIV century) Nauka, Leningrad, 1987.
- Borʹba Rusi protiv shvedskoĭ ekspansii v Karelii:Konet︠s︡ XIII - nachalo IVv. (The struggle of Russia against the Swedish expansion in Karelia the end of the XIII - the beginning of the XIV century) Petrozavodsk, 1987.
- Russkaia morskaia torgovlia na Baltike v XVII v. (torgovlia so Shvetsiei). (Russian maritime trade in the Baltic in the XVII century (trade with Sweden)) Nauka, Saint Petersburg, 1994. ISBN 5020273783
- Ekonomicheskie otnosheniia Rossii i Shvedskogo gosudarstva v XVII v. (Economic Relations between Russia and the Swedish State in the Seventeenth Century) Dmitrii Bulanin, Saint Petersburg, 1998. ISBN 5860071051

== See also ==
- G. V. Forsten
