= Volobuyev =

Volobuev, Volobuiev, or Volobuyev (Russian: Волобуев, Ukrainian: Волобуєв) is a surname, and may refer to:

- Andrei Volobuyev (born 1984), Russian footballer
- Anatoliy Volobuyev (born 1953), Ukrainian footballer
- Ivan Volobuiev (born 1991), Russian ice dancer
- Mykhailo Volobuiev (1903–1972), Ukrainian economist
- Pavel Volobuev (1923–1977), Azerbaijani historian
- Sergei Volobuyev (born 1972), Russian footballer
