= Pochinki =

Pochinki (Russian: Починки) is the name of several rural localities in USSR.

== Ivanovo Oblast ==
As of 1815, two rural localities in Ivanovo Oblast bear this name:

- Pochinki, Ivanovsky District, Ivanovo Oblast, a village in Ivanovsky District
- Pochinki, Yuryevetsky District, Ivanovo Oblast, a village in Yuryevetsky District

== Kaluga Oblast ==
As of 1815, one rural locality in Kaluga Oblast bears this name:

- Pochinki, Kaluga Oblast, a village under the administrative jurisdiction of the city of Kaluga

== Kostroma Oblast ==
As of 1815, one rural locality in Kostroma Oblast bears this name:

- Pochinki, Kostroma Oblast, a village in Nezhitinskoye Settlement of Makaryevsky District

== Republic of Mordovia ==
As of 1815, one rural locality in the Republic of Mordovia bears this name:

- Pochinki, Republic of Mordovia, a selo in Pochinkovsky Selsoviet of Bolshebereznikovsky District

== Moscow Oblast ==
As of 1815, ten rural localities in Moscow Oblast bear this name:

- Pochinki, Mozhaysky District, Moscow Oblast, a village in Borisovskoye Rural Settlement of Mozhaysky District, Moscow Oblast
- Pochinki, Noginsky District, Moscow Oblast, a village in Yamkinskoye Rural Settlement of Noginsky District
- Pochinki, Podolsky District, Moscow Oblast, a village in Klenovskoye Rural Settlement of Podolsky District
- Pochinki, Ramensky District, Moscow Oblast, a village in Ganusovskoye Rural Settlement of Ramensky District
- Pochinki, Shakhovskoy District, Moscow Oblast, a village in Ramenskoye Rural Settlement of Shakhovskoy District
- Pochinki, Shatursky District, Moscow Oblast, a village in Krivandinskoye Rural Settlement of Shatursky District
- Pochinki, Solnechnogorsky District, Moscow Oblast, a village in Smirnovskoye Rural Settlement of Solnechnogorsky District
- Pochinki, Semenovskoye Rural Settlement, Stupinsky District, Moscow Oblast, a village in Semenovskoye Rural Settlement of Stupinsky District
- Pochinki, Stupino Town, Stupinsky District, Moscow Oblast, a village under the administrative jurisdiction of the town of Stupino, Stupinsky District
- Pochinki, Yegoryevsky District, Moscow Oblast, a selo in Yurtsovskoye Rural Settlement of Yegoryevsky District

== Nizhny Novgorod Oblast ==
As of 1815, four rural localities in Nizhny Novgorod Oblast bear this name:

- Pochinki, Koverninsky District, Nizhny Novgorod Oblast, a village in Skorobogatovsky Selsoviet of Koverninsky District
- Pochinki, Pochinkovsky District, Nizhny Novgorod Oblast, a selo in Pochinkovsky Selsoviet of Pochinkovsky District
- Pochinki, Shatkovsky District, Nizhny Novgorod Oblast, a selo in Smirnovsky Selsoviet of Shatkovsky District
- Pochinki, Voznesensky District, Nizhny Novgorod Oblast, a village in Kriushinsky Selsoviet of Voznesensky District

== Novgorod Oblast ==
As of 1815, one rural locality in Novgorod Oblast bears this name:

- Pochinki, Novgorod Oblast, a village in Belebelkovskoye Settlement of Poddorsky District

== Perm Krai ==
As of 2010, one rural locality in Perm Krai bears this name:

- Pochinki, Perm Krai, a village in Ordinsky District

== Pskov Oblast ==
As of 1815, three rural localities in Pskov Oblast bear this name:

- Pochinki, Kunyinsky District, Pskov Oblast, a village in Kunyinsky District
- Pochinki, Loknyansky District, Pskov Oblast, a village in Loknyansky District
- Pochinki, Novosokolnichesky District, Pskov Oblast, a village in Novosokolnichesky District

== Smolensk Oblast ==
As of 1851, one rural locality in Smolensk Oblast bears this name:

- Pochinki, Smolensk Oblast, a village in Dneprovskoye Rural Settlement of Novoduginsky District

== Tula Oblast ==
As of 1841, two rural localities in Tula Oblast bear this name:

- Pochinki, Griboyedovskaya Volost, Kurkinsky District, Tula Oblast, a village in Griboyedovskaya Volost of Kurkinsky District
- Pochinki, Samarskaya Volost, Kurkinsky District, Tula Oblast, a village in Samarskaya Volost of Kurkinsky District

== Tver Oblast ==
As of 1857, five rural localities in Tver Oblast bear this name:

- Pochinki, Kalininsky District, Tver Oblast, a village in Kalininsky District
- Pochinki, Kashinsky District, Tver Oblast, a village in Kashinsky District
- Pochinki (Chertolino Rural Settlement), Rzhevsky District, Tver Oblast, a village in Rzhevsky District; municipally, a part of Chertolino Rural Settlement of that district
- Pochinki (Pobeda Rural Settlement), Rzhevsky District, Tver Oblast, a village in Rzhevsky District; municipally, a part of Pobeda Rural Settlement of that district
- Pochinki, Sandovsky District, Tver Oblast, a village in Sandovsky District

== Udmurt Republic ==
As of 1875, one rural locality in the Udmurt Republic bears this name:

- Pochinki, Udmurt Republic, a village in Yezhevsky Selsoviet of Yukamensky District

== Vladimir Oblast ==
As of 1852, two rural localities in Vladimir Oblast bear this name:

- Pochinki, Gorokhovetsky District, Vladimir Oblast, a village in Gorokhovetsky District
- Pochinki, Gus-Khrustalny District, Vladimir Oblast, a village in Gus-Khrustalny District

== Yaroslavl Oblast ==
As of 1832, six rural localities in Yaroslavl Oblast bear this name:

- Pochinki, Bolsheselsky District, Yaroslavl Oblast, a village in Vysokovsky Rural Okrug of Bolsheselsky District
- Pochinki, Nekouzsky District, Yaroslavl Oblast, a village in Rodionovsky Rural Okrug of Nekouzsky District
- Pochinki, Pereslavsky District, Yaroslavl Oblast, a village in Zagoryevsky Rural Okrug of Pereslavsky District
- Pochinki, Melenkovsky Rural Okrug, Yaroslavsky District, Yaroslavl Oblast, a village in Melenkovsky Rural Okrug of Yaroslavsky District
- Pochinki, Ryutnevsky Rural Okrug, Yaroslavsky District, Yaroslavl Oblast, a village in Ryutnevsky Rural Okrug of Yaroslavsky District
- Pochinki, Shirinsky Rural Okrug, Yaroslavsky District, Yaroslavl Oblast, a village in Shirinsky Rural Okrug of Yaroslavsky District
