= Yevgenyevka =

Yevgenyevka may refer to:

- Yevgenyevka (Almaty Region), a former village in Enbekshikazakh District, Kazakhstan
- Yevgenyevka (Pavlodar Region), a village in the Aksu City Administration, Kazakhstan
- Yevgenyevka, Russia, name of several rural localities in Russia
