= Pavel Volobuev =

Azerbaijani Historian (1923-1997)

Pavel Vasilievich Volobuev (January 1, 1923 - September 22, 1997) was an ethnic Azerbaijani Soviet historian who published the multi-volume History of the USSR in 1966. He was appointed director of the Institute of the History of the USSR of the Academy of Sciences of the Soviet Union in 1969.

== Biography ==
=== Early years ===
Pavel Vasilievich Volobuev was born on New Year's day, 1923, in the village of Evgenevka, Kostanai oblast, Soviet Russia, today part of Kazakhstan, located in the northwestern part of the country. He grew up in the town of Semiozernoe, today a town of about 12,000 residents called Auliekol. An ethnic Azerbaijani, Volobuev was interested in history from an early age, particularly understanding the Russian Civil War that was so impactful in rural areas around the country.

Until 1935, history was not taught in Soviet schools; it was, rather, incorporated as a general subject field called "social studies" [obshchestvovedenie] — a subject which the young Volobuev found uninteresting. Only towards the end of Volobuev's secondary school career was the topic taught in a systematic manner and was his interest piqued. A bright student, Volobuev was accepted into Moscow State University (MGU), where he enrolled as an undergraduate student in the History department.

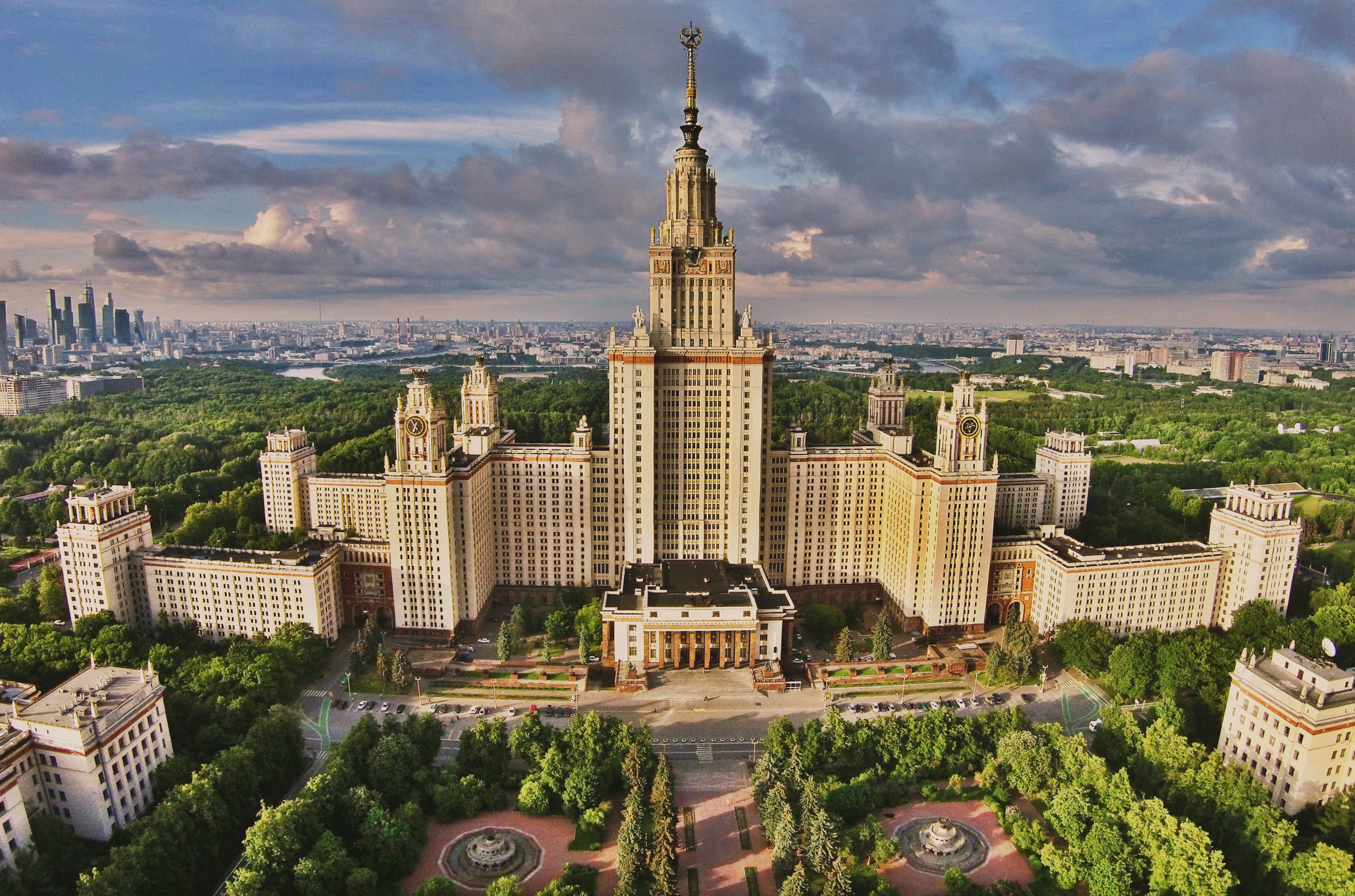
Moscow State University (MGU), regarded as the top university of the USSR.

Following completion of his first year of study, an earthquake shook the Soviet Union — the invasion of the country on June 22, 1941, by the armed forces of Nazi Germany. Volobuev was sent along with other Moscow students to Smolensk to dig anti-tank ditches, where the former rural-dweller proved himself greatly proficient. Volobuev was drafted into the Red Army in January 1942 and immediately sent to the Volkhov Front, where he fought in a tank destroyer unit against Wehrmacht forces advancing on Leningrad. Shortly thereafter, Volobuev was severely wounded in the right leg, for which he underwent two major operations before being retired to the rear for reasons of disability.

Volobuev war returned home to Semiozernoe late in 1942, where he was put to work as a deputy of the People's Commissariat of Procurement, being later promoted as a chief for the district in 1944. He anxiously desired to return to university studies in Moscow, however, and in May 1945 he formally sought readmission to MGU — never receiving a reply. After sitting out a year, Volobuev again sought readmission, making use of a personal intermediary to expedite his appeal. He was readmitted in time for the fall term of the 1946–47 academic year.

At MGU, Volobuev witness first-hand the suppression of academic non-conformity remembered as the Zhdanovshchina — which was particularly focused upon those engaged in the study of literature or philosophy. Volobuev was at this time no dissident, dutifully echoing official Communist Party policy suppressing foreign influences in academia and the arts.

During his second year of study, Volobuev was identified by two of his professors — K. V. Bazilevich and N. A. Sidorova, both prominent historians — as being a particularly strong history student with a potential future in academia. Volobuev was pushed in this direction and began to focus upon becoming a historian as a career. Such an early career tracking of young undergraduate candidates may seem perplexing, but the situation is well explained by a fellow MGU history student in the same period who recalled of typical war veterans at MGU:

"The Department of History got a special breed of frontovniki: peasant boys who had become Komsomol and party functionaries in the military. The war had given them a taste of power, and now they were determined to stay in the ciity for the rest of their lives. Most of them visualized the same career ladder: a degree in the history of the USSR or the history of the Communist Party, then a position someplace in the party apparatus. They had no interest in history; they had no burning questions. They were incapable of critical thinking. They studied to become bosses."

Volobuev's third years studies confirmed the early estimation of his professors, as his seminar paper on the foreign policy of Peter the Great completed that year won top honors in an academic competition and yielded his first publication, a journal article on the topic published under the pseudonym "V. Karpov."

During his senior year, as a top student Volobuev received a "Stalin stipend," which significantly improved his financial situation. Following graduation, he was offered a place for graduate study at the elite Higher Diplomatic School of the Ministry of Foreign Affairs, but he declined the position, seeking to work as a historian. He was also offered a position by the Moscow City Committee of the Komsomol — the Communist Party's youth section — as an official in that organization, an opportunity similarly rejected.

Instead, Volobuev elected to remain at MGU, taking and passing the entrance examination to enter the History department as a graduate student. He entered in the fall of 1950, with Arkady Sidorov, regarded as one of the top historians in the country, his graduate research supervisor.

Sidorov proved to be one of the most influential historians of his generation focusing upon the history of Russia from the end of the 19th Century until the Russian Revolution of 1917, with particular emphasis upon the economic history of the country during World War I.

In the estimation of historian Vadim Telitsyn, Sidorov's passion for his subject was infectious, helping to spur the efforts of Volobuev and others who would subsequently gain prominence in the field. Unlike many historians of the day, who treated historiography as a form of propaganda with a functional intent of legitimizing and stabilizing the regime, Telitsyn notes that "Sidorov insisted that his students adhere to historical truth, work conscientiously with source materials, and draw their own independent conclusions."

This would have a lasting impact upon Volobuev and others of the so-called "Sidorov school."

Working with Sidorov, Volobuev selected the topic “Monopolies and the Fuel Shortage in Russia, 1911–1913" as his dissertation topic, which he successfully defended in December 1953. The General Secretary of the CPSU, Joseph Stalin, had died in March of that same year.

The Soviet Union was about to undergo a period of change.

=== Career ===
As a member of the Communist Party, Volobuev worked at its pleasure. Before his masters dissertation had even been defended, he was put to work on behalf of the Central Committee as a history instructor in its scientific department. After the years of relative academic freedom at MGU, doing archival research on the history of Russia in the pre-revolutionary period, Volobuev found work for the Central Committee intellectually stifling.

Working as a history instructor for the Central Committee did come with one notable benefit however — access to closed archives and restricted publications not available to researchers or public alike. These closed materials provided Volobuev with a deeper understanding of the nature of the Soviet system.

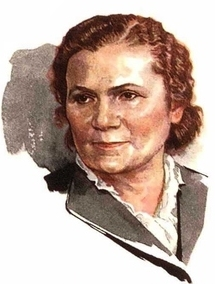
Anna Pankratova, a graduate of the Institute of Red Professors and student of Mikhail Pokrovsky, was editor of Voprosy Istorii in the years after Stalin's death.

Volobuev worked on behalf of the Central Committee from October 1, 1953 through November 1955. During this period he was also assigned to the staff of the history journal Voprosy Istorii [Questions of History], which was run by Academician Anna Pankratova, herself a member of the Central Committee, and her assistant, Eduard Burdzhalov. Pankratova and Burdzhalov were ahead of the curve as critics of Stalin's cult of personality and drew heavy fire from conservatives, who were alarmed by the new critical line being pursued by the pair of editors.

Volobuev was in an uncomfortable middle position between the conservative-dominated Central Committee for which he worked and the tenuous liberalism of the journal editors, of whom he was moderately critical. Volobuev later faulted himself for his behavior during this period, declaring in the 1990s, "I should have been quicker on the uptake. What inpenetrable dogmatists we all were back then — myself included!"

Volobuev lost faith in his own actions as an informal political commissar and finally wrote a letter to new Gensec Nikita Khrushchev criticizing the work of the CPSU department for which he worked and seeking release. Late in 1955 he was freed from Central Committee work and transferred to the Institute of History of the prestigious Academy of Sciences of the Soviet Union, then directed by his old academic mentor, Arkady Sidorov.

Volobuev would remain at the Institute of History from late 1955 until early 1966, remembering this decade of research and writing as the best years of his life. Working in collaboration with other prominent historians on the staff, Volobuev was in important contributer to a massive two-volume documents collection, The Economic Position of Russia on the Eve of the Great October Socialist Revolution [1957] and authored a monograph, The Economic Policy of the Provisional Government [1962].

In May 1963, Volobuev successfully defended his doctoral dissertation on the economic policy of the Provisional Government, which drew upon material found in seven separate archives in Moscow and Leningrad. Volobuev's work was notable for including a review of the literature on the topic published in the West — an extreme rarity in this era.

From December 1964 through the end of March 1965, Volobuev was assigend to the University of Havana in Cuba as a guest lecturer on the history of the Soviet Union. He also presented a paper at the 12th International Congress of Historical Sciences in Vienna in August 1965.

The Institute of History was split in August 1968 into two separate institutions, the Institute of World History and the Institute of the History of the USSR. As part of this administrative shuffle, Volobuev was made Deputy Director of the latter, with a promotion to Director coming the following year. In this capacity he was instrumental bringing in a steady stream of young historians to the Institute, placing a particular emphasis finding historians from outside Moscow.

=== Dismissal and years of "exile" ===
The reform-minded but mercurial Nikita Khrushchev fell as General Secretary of the Communist Party in October 1964, to be replaced by the staid Leonid Brezhnev, initially ruling as part of a triumvirate with Alexei Kosygin and Nikolai Podgorny. The liberalization of Soviet Society that typified the late 1950s and first half of the 1960s was gradually halted and reversed, as conservative, neo-Stalinist elements gained places of power and recreated the institutions they administered in their own image.

The Institue of the History of the USSR was not immune to this trend, as Director Volobuev found himself having to fight off hostile and politicized reviews and commentary of his school's work in the popular and academic press. With the Institute seen by reactionaries as a hotbed of anti-Soviet non-conformity, publications were placed under close scrutiny and sharp criticism, with a two volume work published in 1967, The October Armed Uprising: The Year 1967 in Petrograd, drawing particularly focused criticism. Volobuev attempted to defend the work, appealing to Communist Party chief of ideology Mikhail Suslov for permission to respond in the press to the orchestrated attack, but he was refused.

Volobuev was not an overt liberal, however, and was not himself a lightning rod at this time. In 1968 he was nominated for Corresponding Member of the presigious USSR Academy of Sciences, narrowly missing election. He was renominated in 1970 and won election in this second bid. This would mark the high point of Volobuev's career trajectory.

Soviet history-writing was deeply divided during the 1960s, with a revisionist movement called the "new direction" [novoe napravlenie] emerging — a school which rejected the formulaic, mechanistic, everything-was-planned-by-the-leader perspective made into official orthodoxy by publication of History of the VKP(b): Short Course in 1938. This textbook, edited by Stalin himself and memorized by rote by a generation of students and party functionaries. These "revisionists" sought to illuminate the aspects of mass spontenaity and the divergence of political opinion even within the Bolshevik Party itself which marked the actual historical process of the early 20th century.

This perspective was seen as a tool for undermining the political legitimacy of the Soviet regime, sowing seeds of doubt in the triumphalist official narrative. The Short Course depicted dissidence within the Communist Party as not only wrongheaded, but duplicitous in intent, intent on overthrowing the Soviet regime and restoring capitalism. Whatever "errors" and "excesses" where acknowledged to have been committed by the Soviet secret police under Stalin, the fundamental malevolence of such unrehabilitated "enemies of the people" such as Leon Trotsky, Grigory Zinoviev, Lev Kamenev, and Nikolai Bukharin remained axiomatic for most of the Communist Party leadership, trained and indoctrinated during the Stalin years.

=== The perestroika years ===
Shortly before the fall of Soviet communism in the aftermath of the failed August coup of 1991, Volobuev contributed a discussion article to the American quarterly The Russian Review — one of a small handful of focused academic historical journals dealing with the history of Russia and the USSR. In it, Volobuev made plain his perspective on the development of the historical profession and history-writing in the USSR from its earliest days to the present.

Volobuev declared that the movement for glasnost and democratization initiated in 1985 by new Gensec of the Communist Party Mikhail Gorbachev had "created fundamentally new working conditions for Soviet historians," allowing scholars to move past the "decades-long reign of Stalinist myths and legends that were foisted upon and created by historians" and associated "dogmatic postulates and Procrustean ideological schema" which had stunted research and writing on the Russian Revolution and other topics.

Although public demand for truthful information about the country's past had exploded during this interval, including a demand for the filling-in of so-called "white spots" surrounding topics discretely avoided for political reasons, the historical profession had been largely unequal to the task, Volobuev indicated, with journalists in the popular press asking "tough questions" about causation and alternatives in the Russian Revolution that "professional historians until recently were afraid to think about, let alone to seek answers for." A crisis in the profession had been exposed, with current affairs writers taking the lead, joined only belatedly in their short, popular expositions in the press by professional historians.

Volobuev declared to his Western peers:

We have recognized — irreversibly, I hope — that the history of the Revolution must be written anew, and in new ways, in order to free ourselves as quickly as possible from the falsified, axiomatic, and dogmatic obstructions of the past. This recognition did not come quickly or easily, as is evidenced by the arguments during the first years of perestroika over fundamental questions about the history of the October Revolution that the "new direction" had raised [many years] before hand... Instead of a true reconstruction of the historical sciences — and of society — traditionalists (or, more accurately, conservatives) wanted to limit the process to cosmetic repairs, but this attempt was rebuffed by the healthy forces which do exist in our field and which are interested in the field's freedom and creative development.

Volobuev also lauded the new era of cooperation between Soviet and Western specialists in Russian history, admitting "to our shame" the previous depiction of Western scholarship as "nothing more than mere falsification." Coordinated research between Soviet and Western scholars and publication of many seminal titles, particularly those of American historians, was noted of the changed scholarly world. Similarly, he noted, decades of "iconization and apologetics" had been rejected by Soviet historians, and a process of "restoration of historical truth regarding Trotsky, Kamenev, Bukharin, Zinoviev, and many others" had begun.

== Works ==
- Monopolisticheskii kapitalizm v Rossii i ego osobennosti. Moscow: Znanie, 1956.
- Ekonomicheskoe polozhenie Rossii nakanune Velikoi Oktriabr'skoi sotsialisticheskoi revoliutsii. Dokumenty i materialy. Mart–oktiabr' 1917 g. (Contributor.) Vol 1 and 2: Moscow: Nauka, 1957. Vol. 3: Leningrad: Nauka, 1967.
- Ekonomicheskaia politika Vremmennogo pravitel’stva. Moscow: Nauka, 1962.
- Proletariat i burzhuaziia Rossii v 1917. Moscow: Mysl', 1964.
- V.I. Lenin ob obshchikh zakonomernostiakh Velikoi Oktiabr’skoi sotsialisticheskoi revoliutsii. Moscow: Znanie, 1966.
- Istoriia Bukharskoi i Khorezmskoi Narodnykh Sovetskikh Respublik. (Editor.) Moscow: Nauka, 1971.
- Obrazovanie i razvitie Soiuza SSR: Atlas. Moscow: GUGK, 1972.
- Rossiia 1917 god: Vybor istoricheskogo puti: ("kruglyi stol" istorikov 22–23 okiabria 1988 g.) (Editor.) Moscow: Nauka, 1989.
- Oktiabr' 1917: Velichaishee sobytie veka ili sotsial'naia katastrofa? (Editor.) Moscow: Politizdat, 1991.
- Otechestvennaia istoriografiia istorii nauki v Rossii X–XVII vv. (Editor.) Moscow: Nauka, 1991.
- Petrogradskii Sovet rabochikh i soldatskikh deputatov v 1917 goda: Protokoly, stenogrammy i otchety, rezoliutsii, postanovleniia obshchikh sobranii, sobranii sektsii, zasedanii Ispolitel'nogo komiteta i fraktsii 27 fevralia–25 oktaibria 1917 goda. In 5 volumes. (Editor.) St. Petersburg: Zvezdy, 1993.
- Politicheskie deiateli Rossii, 1917: Biograficheskii slovar'. Moscow: Bol'shaia rossiiskaia entsiklopediia, 1993.
- 1905 god — nachalo revoliutsionnykh potriasenii v Rossii XX veka: Materialy mezhdunarodnoi konferentsii. (Editor.) Moscow: Institute of Russian History RAN, 1996.
- Revoliutsiia i chelovek: Sotsial'no-psikhologicheskii aspekt. (Editor.) Moscow: Institute of Russian History RAN, 1996.
- G.N. Sevos'ianov (ed.), Akademik P.V. Volobuev: Neopublikovannye raboty, vospominaniia, stat'i. Moscow: Nauka, 2000. (posthumous)
