= Skandinavskii sbornik =

Academic journal

Skandinavskii sbornik (Скандинавский сборник)
- Skandinavskii sbornik, Vol. 20 (1975)
- Discipline: History
- Language: Russian
- Edited by: William Pokhlyobkin (1955-1961); Lidiia K. Roots

Publication details
- History: 1956-1990
- Publisher: University of Tartu (Estonia)
- Frequency: Annual

Standard abbreviations
- ISO 4: Skand. Sb.

Indexing
- ISSN: 0320-6432
- LCCN: 60025612
- OCLC no.: 1765599

Skandinavskii sbornik (Scandinavian Review), also Скандинавский сборник, Skandinaavia kogumik, and Skrifter om Skandinavien, was an annual serial publication of the history and wider humanities in Scandinavia and the Baltic. It was published by the University of Tartu in Estonia between 1956 and 1990 and has been described as the principal forum for scholars of Nordic studies in the Soviet region. It emphasised long-term trends over short-term events and had a philosophy that peaceful coexistence between nations and peoples was the most natural order of things. It ceased publication following the collapse of the Soviet Union.

== History ==
The first issue of Skandinavskii sbornik was published in 1956 by the University of Tartu and the Estonian State Publishing House, in the Russian language with article summaries in Estonian and Swedish and other languages. Its founder and first editor, with Lidiia K. Roots, was the historian and food-writer William Pokhlyobkin (1923–2000) who served until 1961.

About Scandinavia but not published in Scandinavia, it has been described by George C. Schoolfield of Yale University, with Scandinavian Studies and The American-Scandinavian Review, as part of the "literatures of the North". It was part of an expansion in Nordic studies in Russia and the Soviet republics that saw departments of Nordic studies established in many universities and institutions in the Soviet region after the Second World War. Its philosophy was to emphasise long-term historical processes and periods of peace over warfare, arguing that peaceful coexistence among nations and peoples was the most natural order of things.

In a review of the first two volumes in 1959, Russian historian I. P. Shaskol'skii welcomed the journal, saying in Вопросы истории (Questions of History) that it brought a Marxist-Leninist approach to the history of the Scandinavian countries to which Soviet historical scholarship had previously paid little attention, leaving many fundamental questions open, such as establishing when the feudal system in Scandinavia transitioned to the capitalist system and when a class society emerged. The emphasis on peaceful periods was needed as Soviet scholarship had formerly focused mainly on Russian wars with the Swedes, thus neglecting the internal economic and social development of the Scandinavian countries. In Shaskol'skii's opinion, the Marxist-Leninist approach enabled breakthroughs in solving problems that had defeated bourgeois historians, such as the ownership of peasant lands in Norway. He also noted the extensive use made by authors of archival material, in Russia and outside, that had not previously been examined by Soviet scholars, and the frequency with which contributors addressed questions of historiography and interpretation.

Scandinavian specialist Ernst Ekman of the University of California wrote that Swedish historians had been more interested in relations with Germany than with Russia and that therefore it had fallen to Russian historians to highlight relations with Sweden, particularly in respect of Russian support for Sweden during the Thirty Years' War, saying in reference to Skandinavskii sbornik that "the whole existence of a special journal for Soviet specialists on Scandinavia is an indication of their interest in this".

In 1965, after the Soviet regime eased censorship as part of a process of de-Stalinization, the name of railway engineer Yury Lomonosov appeared in Skandinavskii sbornik and other publications considered to have a specialist audience, after years of his existence being suppressed.

In 1970, Finnish historian Erkki Kuujo reviewed the output of the journal from 1956 to volume 24 in 1979 in two articles for the Jahrbücher für Geschichte Osteuropas (Yearbooks for the History of Eastern Europe) in which he noted that despite the publication's claims for international collaboration, the majority of the authors were from the Soviet Union, the choice of flags for the cover revealing which countries were counted among the Nordic ones. Like Shaskol'skii, Kuujo noted authors referencing archives throughout the Soviet Union, for instance in Tartu and Riga, not just in Moscow.

Heinz E. Ellersieck of the California Institute of Technology wrote in 1974 that the historians of Skandinavskii sbornik developed the idea of the "friendly frontier" as part of their mission to "develop and strengthen 'the friendly connections between the peoples of the Soviet Union and their nearest neighbors in the northwest' ", a process that began with the publication of an article by Boris Porshnev about Russian friendship with Sweden during the Thirty Years' War. Later articles backtracked somewhat to restate Russia's legitimate claims for western expansion.

Apart from history, the journal also covered economics, law, philosophy and the wider humanities, such as linguistics and the runic alphabets and inscriptions of Scandinavia such as the runic wand from Staraja Ladoga in north-west Russian, and a likely phonemic structure for the runic alphabet.

Prilozhenie (supplementary) editions were published such as the Moscow-based historian of printing, P. K. Kolmakov's, Statisticheskie i bibliograficheskie istochniki po istorii pechati skandinavskikh stran (1963) which offered a bibliography and description of sources for the history of printing in the Scandinavian countries.

Skandinavskii sbornik ceased publication in 1990 following the collapse of the Soviet Union.

== Indexing and impact ==
In 1981 Skandinavskii sbornik was included in the description of key Estonian, Latvian, Lithuanian, and Belarusian historical and archival sources that was published by Inter Documentation Company (IDC) and edited by Harvard University's Patricia Kennedy Grimsted. It was indexed and abstracted in America: History and Life (1971-?), and the Bibliography of the History of Art (BHA).

In 2016, the Nordic and Baltic Studies Review described Skandinavskii sbornik as the "main scholarly forum for the Soviet scholars of the Nordic studies" for 35 years and assessed that its contribution to the "development of the Nordic studies in the USSR and its successor states is hard to overestimate".

== See also ==
- Scandinavica
