= James McFarlane =

James Walter McFarlane (12 December 1920, Sunderland – 9 August 1999, Stody, Norfolk) was a scholar of European literature, author of The Oxford Ibsen, and founding Dean of the School of European Studies at University of East Anglia which included Scandinavian studies.

== Early years ==
McFarlane grew up in Sunderland and attended Bede Grammar School, and then went to St Catherine's College, Oxford. His Oxford degree in modern languages, interrupted by war while he served in Europe in the Intelligence Corps, was completed in 1947. During the war he played association football for Sunderland A.F.C.

His first appointment was as lecturer at Durham University in 1947, in the department of German and Scandinavian studies at King's College. (In 1963, this became Newcastle University) Here he encountered the likes of Harald Næss and Ake Leander.

== Oxford Ibsen ==
Between 1960 and 1977 he edited the eight volumes of The Oxford Ibsen (OI), consisting of translations of Henrik Ibsen's works, many of which were his own. Graham Orton is credited as an editor and translator. Other contributors included Johan Fillinger, Christopher Fry and James Kirkup.

Volumes

1. 1970: Early plays
2. 1962: The Vikings at Helgeland, Love's Comedy, The Pretenders
3. 1972: Brand; Peer Gynt
4. 1963: The League of Youth, Emperor and Galilean
5. 1961: Pillars of society; A Doll's House; Ghosts
6. 1960: An Enemy of the People; The Wild Duck; Rosmersholm
7. 1966: Lady From the Sea; Hedda Gabler, the Master Builder
8. 1977: Little Eyolf; John Gabriel Borkman; When We Dead Awaken

As a result of this work, McFarlane was also appointed a Knight Commander of the Royal Norwegian Order of Saint Olav, and made a member of Danish and Norwegian academies.

== University of East Anglia ==
McFarlane moved to Norwich, and in 1964 he was appointed Chair of European Literature at the newly established University of East Anglia, and founding dean of the school of European studies.

Between 1968 and 1971 he was the Pro-Vice-Chancellor. In 1974 he became the editor of the journal Scandinavica.

In 1982 he retired, however he remained active as a Professorial Fellow until 1986.

In his retirement he established and built his Norvik Press to publish translations and commentary of Scandinavian literature, with a bias in publishing translations and other works by its own editorial team.

In 1991 he retired from editor of Scandinavica.

== Community life ==
He married Kathleen Crouch in 1944. They were both active in the community, with James acting as:

- member of council for the Eastern Arts Association
- Chairman of the BBC Regional Advisory Board
- Chairman of the Wells Arts Centre
- Chairman of the Hunsworth Crafts Trust
- a director of the Norwich Puppet Theatre

Kathleen had a distinguished career in weaving, and died in 2008, survived by their daughter and two sons.

== Bibliography ==
- Knut Hamsun; James Walter McFarlane (tr.) (1955). Pan: from Lieutenant Thomas Glahn's papers. Noonday Press. OCLC 1562625.
- James Walter McFarlane (1960). Ibsen and the temper of Norwegian literature. Oxford University Press. OCLC 27765423.
- Ibsen; James Walter McFarlane & Graham Orton (tr.) (1960–1977). The Oxford Ibsen (8v.). Oxford University Press. OCLC 237131207.
- Malcolm Bradbury; James Walter McFarlane (1976). Modernism: A Guide To European Literature. Penguin. ISBN 0-14-021933-1.
- Knut Hamsun; James Walter McFarlane (tr.) (1980). Wayfarers. New York: Farrar, Straus Giroux. ISBN 0-374-28672-8.
