= William Pokhlyobkin =

Russian writer and historian (1923–2000)

- Вильям Васильевич Похлёбкин
- Born: August 20, 1923; Moscow, Soviet Union
- Died: c. March 31, 2000 (aged 76); Podolsk, Russia
- Citizenship: Soviet Union (1923–1991) → Russia (1991–2000)
- Education: Moscow State Institute of International Relations
- Known for: Culinary books; books about history
- Awards: Langhe Ceretto Prize (1993)
- Scientific career
- Fields: History; Scandinavian studies; heraldry; international relations
- Workplaces: Institute of History at the Academy of Sciences of the Soviet Union

William August Vasilyevich Pokhlyobkin (Note: In this name that follows East Slavic naming customs, the patronymic is Vasilyevich and the family name is Pokhlyobkin.) (Russian: Ви́льям-Август Васи́льевич Похлёбкин, August 20, 1923 – c. March 31, 2000) was a Soviet and Russian historian specializing in Scandinavian studies, heraldry, and the diplomacy and international relations of Russia. He was also known as a geographer, journalist, and an expert on the history of Russian cuisine. As such, he authored numerous culinary books. His A History of Vodka has been translated into a number of languages, including English.

== Biography ==
William Pokhlyobkin's father was Russian revolutionary Vasili Mikhailov (Михайлов Василий Михайлович). "Pokhlyobkin" was Mikhailov's underground nickname, derived from the word "Pokhlyobka" which is a type of vegetable soup. According to various sources, William was either named after William Shakespeare, or "Vil-August" (Вил-Август) after Vladimir Ilyich Lenin and August Bebel, or due to being born in the month of August. He was referred to as simply "William" by his family.

He took part in the Soviet-Finnish War and German-Soviet War as a private. Early in the war he received a concussion and was re-assigned to work in food preparation.

After his discharge from service, he studied at the Moscow State Institute of International Relations from 1945 to 1949 with focuses on Scandinavia and Yugoslavia, and later completed postgraduate courses at the Institute of History of the USSR Academy of Sciences. He became a Kandidat of Historical Sciences and a research member at the Institute of History in 1953. He founded the journal Skandinavskii sbornik ("Скандинавский сборник") and was its chief editor from 1955 to 1961. He was later a member of the editorial collegium of the journal Scandinavica. According to both Pokhlyobkin and his own contemporaries at the Institute, his contentious personality and frequent quarrels with his colleagues and supervisors prevented him from finishing his doctoral dissertation or finding steady employment as an historian. After leaving the Institute, he began writing about cuisine.

In 1968, Pokhlyobkin's first monograph on food Tea: Its Properties, Types, and Use (Чай. Его свойства, типы, и употребление) was published. According to Pokhlyobkin, the book was ideologically neutral, but was popular with dissidents despite Pokhlyobkin's overt patriotism. Tea received negative coverage from the KGB-affiliated newspaper Socialist Industry and following this, Pokhlyobkin was barred from publication and from accessing historical archives.

== Reception ==
At the time of his death, 54 books and over 400 additional articles of Pokhlyobkin's had been published. His selected works, published in 1996–1999, comprised six volumes. His works were translated, among others, into English, German, Portuguese, Dutch, Latvian, Lithuanian, Moldovan, Norwegian, Swedish, Danish, Finnish, Estonian, Polish, Croatian, Hungarian, and Chinese. Most of his works were only printed after the dissolution of the Soviet Union. Because so many of his works were printed for the first time simultaneously, some speculated that "Pokhlyobkin" was a pen name of a whole artel of writers.

In 1993, Pokhlyobkin received the Langhe Ceretto Prize, awarded by a jury of specialists from the United Kingdom, France, Germany, and Italy for works on food culture. His book The History of Vodka was recognized as the best work in the alcoholic beverages category.

However, A History of Vodka has been criticized by Lev Usyskin for containing many errors, and in 2014, Professor Mark Schrad of Villanova University demonstrated that much of the history contained in the book was likely fabricated by Pokhlyobkin. Of particular note is a trademark dispute that Pokhlyobkin claimed took place between the Soviet Union and Poland over exclusive usage of the word "vodka." This dispute did not in fact occur and was apparently invented entirely by Pokhlyobkin. Additionally, Pokhlyobkin's sources for many of the details in A History of Vodka could not be verified, and Schrad believes that such sources likely never existed.

== Death ==
Pokhlyobkin was murdered in his apartment in Podolsk between March 27 and 31, 2000 at the age of 76. He was stabbed eleven times with a screwdriver. Alcohol was found in his system despite the fact that he was a teetotaler. His body was discovered on April 13 by the chief editor of the Polyfakt publishing house, who was worried about the delay of the book Cuisine of the Century and had arrived from Moscow to Podolsk to meet with Pokhlyobkin. A large number of his books on Scandinavian topics remain unpublished. His murder remains unsolved.

== See also ==
- List of unsolved murders (2000–present)

== Bibliography ==
=== Culinary ===
- Tea: Types, Properties, and Use. Food Industry, Moscow, 1968.
- Everything about Spices. Food Industry, Moscow, 1973.
- The Ethnic Cuisines of our Peoples. Light and Food Industry, Moscow, 1978.
- Secrets of Good Cooking. Molodaya Gvardiya, Moscow, 1979.
- Cooking for Fun. Light and Food Industry, Moscow, 1983.
- On Culinary from A to Z. A Reference Book. Polymya, Minsk, 1988.
- A History of Vodka. Inter-Verso, Moscow, 1991.
  - A History of Vodka. (in English) Verso-Books, Moscow, 1992.
- The Dinner is Served! Repertoire of Food and Beverages in the Russian Classical Dramas from the End of the 18th Century to the Beginning of the 20th Century. Artist, Director and Theater, Moscow, 1993.
- Tea and Vodka in the History of Russia. Krasnoyarsk, 1995.
- Culinary Dictionary. Tsentrpoligraf, Moscow, 1996.
- From the History of Russian Culinary Culture. Tsentrpoligraf, Moscow, 1997.
- History of Essential Foodstuff. Tsentrpoligraf, Moscow, 1997.
- Culinary Arts and Cooking Accessories. Tsentrpoligraf, Moscow, 1999.
- My Cuisine and My Menu. Tsentrpoligraf, Moscow, 1999.
- Culinary arts. Tsentrpoligraf, Moscow, 1999.
- Cuisine of the Century. Polifakt, Moscow, 2000.
- Great Encyclopedia of Culinary Arts. Tsentrpoligraf, Moscow, 2003.

=== History and politics ===
- Denmark. Geografgiz, Moscow, 1955.
- Sweden, Norway, Denmark, Iceland. Geografgiz, Moscow, 1956.
- Norway. Geografgiz, Moscow, 1957.
- Scandinavian Countries and USSR. Znaniye, Moscow, 1958.
- Finland and the Soviet Union. Znaniye, Moscow, 1961.
- The Baltic and the Fight for Peace. Znaniye, Moscow, 1966.
- State System of Iceland. Yuridicheskaya Literatura, Moscow, 1967.
- USSR - Finland. 260 Years of Relations (1713—1973). International Relations, Moscow, 1975.
- Urho Kaleva Kekkonen. Political Biography. International Relations, Moscow, 1985.
  - Urho Kaleva Kekkonen. (in Estonian) Eesti Raamat, Tallinn, 1988.
- Dictionary of International Symbols and Emblems. International Relations, Moscow, 1989.
- Tatars and Rus. 360 Years of Relations between Rus and Tatar States in 13-16 Centuries, 1238-1598 (from the Battle on the River Sit' to the Conquering of Siberia). International Relations, Moscow, 2000.
- Foreign Policy of Rus, Russia, USSR for 1000 Years, in Names, Dates and Facts. A Reference Book. International Relations, Moscow, 1992.
- The Great Pseudonym (about Joseph Stalin's name). Yudit, Moscow, 1996.
- The Great War and the Peace that Never Happened 1941 - 1945 - 1994. A Military and Foreign-Policy Reference Book on the History of the Great Patriotic War and its International Legal Aftereffects from June 22nd 1941 to August 31st 1994. Art-Business Center, Moscow, 1997.
