= The Oxford Ibsen =

Book series edited by James Walter McFarlane

Henrik Ibsen in 1863, in an 1888 xylographic reproduction by Hans Peter Hansen, after a photo by Daniel Georg Nyblin

The Oxford Ibsen is a book series containing the most comprehensive English translations of the noted playwright Henrik Ibsen's collected works, edited by James Walter McFarlane (1920–1999) and published between 1960 and 1977. It is an important edition as the releases of Ibsen's plays are often translated into third languages through The Oxford Ibsen, rather than from the original Norwegian or Danish source texts. It also contains some drafts and preparations, and each play has a foreword that informs about first performances on stage, interpretation and reception. The Oxford series is still missing some of Ibsen's articles, reviews, speeches, correspondence, and poetry.

== Publications ==
- The Oxford Ibsen Volume I. Early Plays. Edited and translated by James Walter McFarlane and Graham Orton. Oxford University Press. London 1970.
- The Oxford Ibsen Volume II. The Vikings at Helgeland. Love's Comedy. The Pretenders. Edited by James Walter McFarlane with translations by Jens Arup, James Walter McFarlane, Evelyn Ramsden and Glynne Wickham. Oxford University Press. London 1962.
- The Oxford Ibsen Volume III. Brand. Peer Gynt. Edited by James Walter McFarlane with translations by James Kirkup and Christopher Fry under assistance by James Walter McFarlane and Johan Fillinger. Oxford University Press. London 1972.
- The Oxford Ibsen Volume IV. The League of Youth. Emperor and Galilean. Edited and translated by James Walter McFarlane and Graham Orton. Oxford University Press. London 1963.
- The Oxford Ibsen Volume V. Pillars of Society. A Doll's House. Ghosts. Edited and translated by James Walter McFarlane. Oxford University Press. London 1961.
- The Oxford Ibsen Volume VI. An Enemy of the People. The Wild Duck. Rosmersholm. Edited and translated by James Walter McFarlane. Oxford University Press. London 1960.
- The Oxford Ibsen Volume VII. The Lady From the Sea. Hedda Gabler. The Master Builder. Edited by James Walter McFarlane with translations by Jens Arup and James Walter McFarlane. Oxford University Press. London 1966.
- The Oxford Ibsen Volume VIII. Little Eyolf. John Gabriel Borkman. When We Dead Awaken. Edited and translated by James Walter McFarlane. Oxford University Press. London 1977.
