= Lelchuk =

Lelchuk (Russian: Лельчук) is a surname. Notable people with the surname include:

- Alan Lelchuk, American novelist, academic, and editor
- V. S. Lelchuk (born 1929), Russian historian
- Zoya Schleining (née Lelchuk, born 1961), German chess player
