= Baidibek Bi =

- Location within Kazakhstan
- Coordinates: 43°30′41.48″N 77°41′54.25″E
- Country: Kazakhstan
- Region: Almaty Region
- Time zone: UTC+5

Baidibek Bi (until 2014 — Malovodnoye) is an ethnically Kazakh village in Almaty Region of south-eastern Kazakhstan. It is located in the Enbekshikazakh District, approximately 75 kilometres north-east of Almaty, near Yanaturmysh. Numerous clashes between Kazakhs and ethnic Chechens have broken out in the village, notably in March-April 2007. In 1985 Yevgenyevka was merged with the village of Malovodnoye, which was renamed Baidibek Bi in 2014.

== Demographics ==
- Most locals are ethnic Kazakhs
- Chechens settlers
- Turkish immigrants
- Chinese immigrants

== Notes ==
- Pannier, Bruce (2007-03-19). "Shoot-Out In Village Leaves Three Dead". Radio Free Europe.
