= Russian History (disambiguation) =

Russian History is the history of the Russian nation, beginning with the establishment of the Rus' state in 862.

Russian History may also refer to:

- Russian History (Brill journal), an English-language quarterly published by Brill Publishers since 1974
- Russian History (RAS journal) (Российская история, Rossiiskaya istoriia), a Russian-language bi-monthly published by the Institute of History of the Russian Academy of Sciences since 1957

== See also ==
- List of Slavic studies journals
