= A History of Vodka =

- First edition softcover, featuring 19th-century lubok
- Author: William Pokhlyobkin
- Original title: История водки
- Translator: Renfrey Clarke
- Language: Russian
- Series: Популярная кулинария (Popular Cookery)
- Subject: Priority of vodka production and other Russian alcoholic beverage issues
- Publisher: Inter-Verso
- Publication date: 1991
- Publication place: former Soviet Union
- English publication date: December, 1992 (Verso Books, hardcover)
- Media type: Book
- Pages: 288 (1991 edition)
- ISBN: 0-86091-359-7 (1992 edition)
- OCLC: 28183139
- Dewey Decimal: 663/.5 20
- LC Class: TP607.V6 P6513 1992
- Preceded by: Urho Kaleva Kekkonen
- Followed by: Foreign Policy of Rus, Russia and the USSR for 1,000 Years in Names, Dates and Facts

A History of Vodka (Russian: «История водки», Romanized: Istoriya vodki) is a book by William Pokhlyobkin. Although the work had been finished in 1979, it wasn't published until 1991, just before the dissolution of the Soviet Union. The book is both an academic monograph and a nationalist polemic claiming that vodka originated in Russia.

The book was popular in Russia, and was the origin of the myth that Poland attempted to sue Russia in international court over the trade rights to the word "vodka". No evidence for such a lawsuit has been found. In 1993 the book received the Langhe Ceretto Prize.

== The book ==
After years of what he claimed was painstaking research, Pokhlyobkin concluded that Russia's first grain-based vodka could have been distilled at the premises of the Chudov Monastery in the Moscow Kremlin by a monk called Isidore circa 1430. Apparently, the distillation technology spread to the city of Moscow itself in 1440s. Pokhlyobkin suggests that both prohibition and drunkenness are scourges which encourage one another. He suggests that irresponsible and uncultured ways of consuming vodka make people drunk, not vodka itself.

The later Russian editions include the 2005 softcover issue by Tsentrpoligraf (ISBN 5-9524-1895-3).

=== Reception ===
Three years after the publication the book was criticized by David Christian in Slavic Review. He cast doubt on statistics presented in the book. In Christian's opinion, the definitions of such terms as distilling and state monopoly were so vague that it was hard to understand how Pokhlyobkin offered firm dates for their first appearance. The arguments about the first usage of the word "vodka" were marked as convoluted, messy, and repetitive, as well as sometimes self-contradictory and unconvincing. Christian also pointed out at anti-capitalist polemics and Stalinist snobberies of the book.

George E. Snow, reviewing the book for the journal Russian History in 1993, describes the book as existing to support the position, for legal and political reasons, that vodka originated in Russia. Snow described the book as succeeding in this argument, despite some factual errors and other issues.

Another criticism provided is that Pokhlyobkin improperly emphasized On the Combinations of Water with Alcohol by Dmitriy Mendeleyev, as he used Mendeleyev's data in a speculative way to ascribe the eminent "biochemical and physiological properties" to solution of spirit and water.

in 2014, Professor Mark Schrad demonstrated that much of the history contained in the book was likely fabricated by Pokhlyobkin. In particular, Pokhlyobkin claimed that he was commissioned to research the history of vodka as a result of an international trademark dispute filed by Poland against the Soviet Union for the exclusive right to use the term "vodka" in marketing, but in fact this trademark dispute never occurred. It is unclear why Pokhlyobkin fabricated this story. Additionally, Pokhlyobkin's sources for many of the other details in A History of Vodka could not be verified, leading Schrad to believe that these claimed sources likely never existed and casting doubt on the integrity and veracity of the entire work.

== See also ==
- List of national drinks
- Protected designation of origin
