= Harald Næss =

Norwegian scholar (1925-2017)

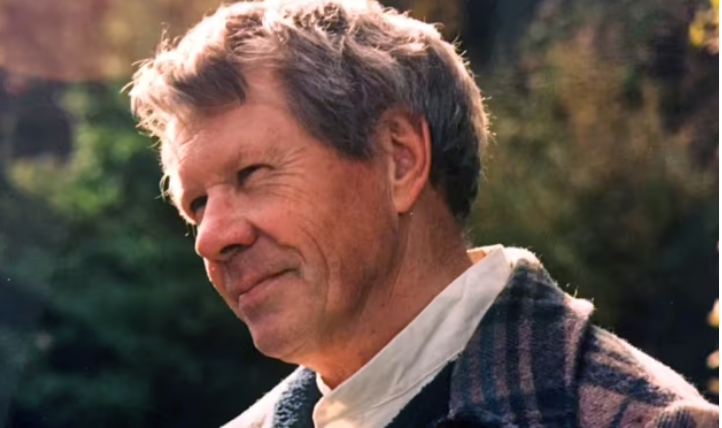
- Born: Harald Sigurd Næss; December 27, 1925; Kristiansand, Norway
- Died: 5 February 2017 (aged 91); Kristiansand, Norway
- Awards: Knight First Class, Royal Norwegian Order of St. Olav (1986)

Academic background
- Education: University of Oslo (cand.philol.)

Academic work
- Discipline: Scandinavian Studies
- Sub-discipline: Hamsun Studies, Norwegian Literature
- Institutions: Durham University; University of Wisconsin-Madison

Harald Sigurd Næss (December 27, 1925 – February 5, 2017) was a Norwegian scholar of Scandinavian Studies and leading authority on the work of Nobel Prize-winning author Knut Hamsun. In the 1950s, he discovered 70 unknown letters by Hamsun and embarked on a life-long project to gather, study, and publish the late author's correspondence. He did so as Torger Thompson Professor in the University of Wisconsin-Madison's Department of Scandinavian Studies, an institution for which he was the "guiding force" from the early 1960s until his retirement in 1991.

Næss was President of the Society for the Advancement of Scandinavian Study (1967-1969) and Editor of Scandinavian Studies (1973-1977). Næss was also a popular speaker among heritage groups in the Upper Midwest, and in 1986, he was made Knight First Class of the Royal Norwegian Order of St. Olav for "his work in spreading knowledge about Norwegian language and culture in the United States of America."

== Early life and education ==
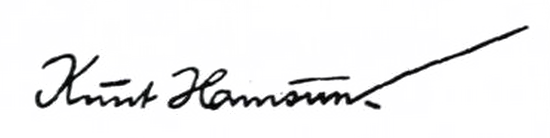
Næss would spend decades trying to locate all letters written by Nobel Prize-winning author, Knut Hamsun

Næss was born in Kristiansand, Norway on December 27, 1925. He completed his cand.philol. at the University of Oslo in 1952. During his studies, he lived in Lysaker with the elderly Elsa Dybwad and her family. Dybwad's deceased husband, Christian Dybwad, had been one of Knut Hamsun's groomsmen. Næss subsequently moved to Stabekk, where he lived with a family related to Hamsun's friend Erik Frydenlund. Frydenlund's daughter Signe showed Næss 70 previously unknown letters sent to her father.

== Career ==
Næss' academic career began in 1953, when he accepted a lecturer position in King's College at Durham University in Newcastle-upon-Tyne (now Newcastle University). Among his colleagues was James McFarlane, a noted Ibsen scholar with whom he would later collaborate on Knut Hamsun: Selected Letters (1990).

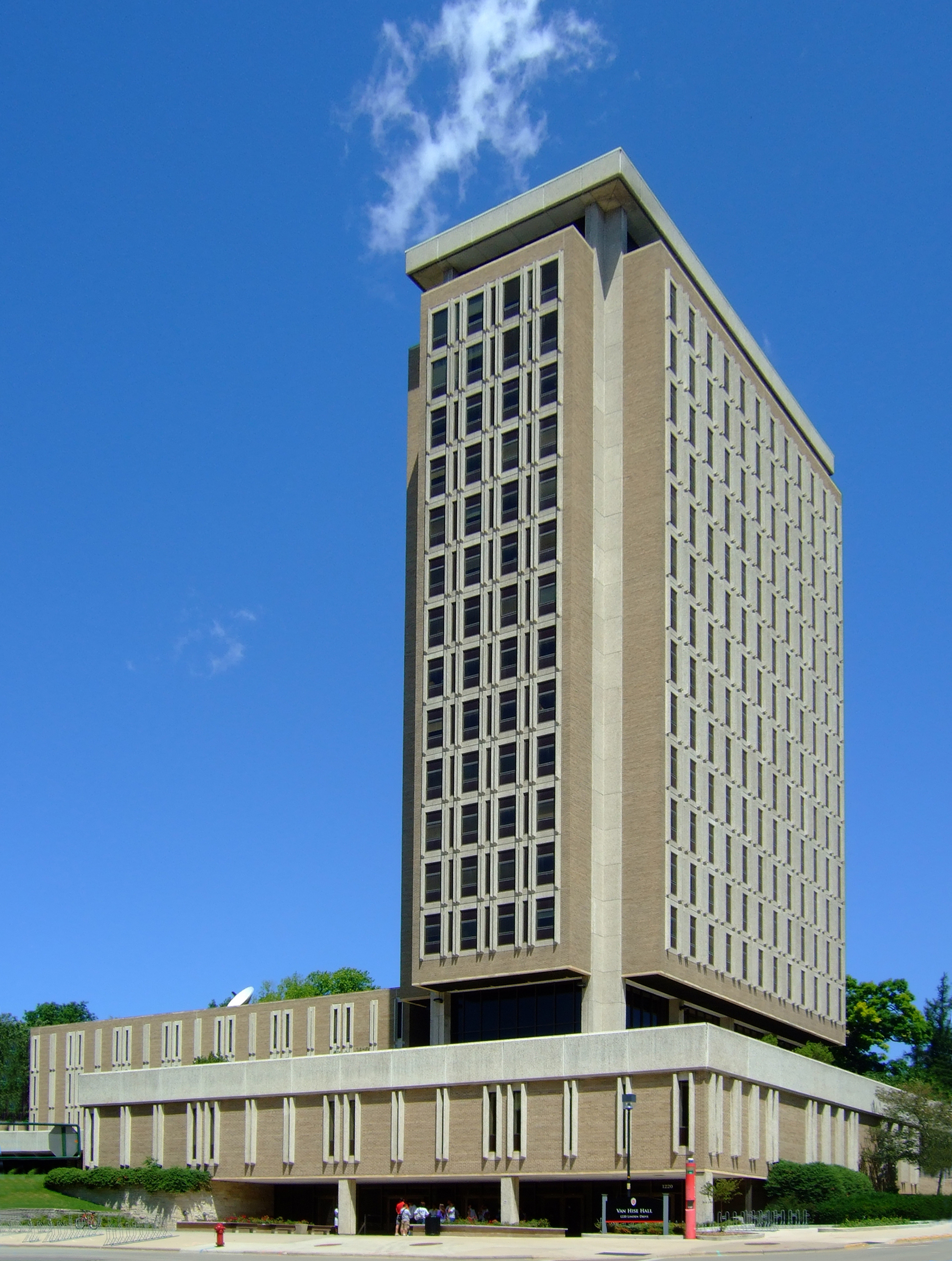
Van Hise Hall at the University of Wisconsin-Madison, home of the Department of Scandinavian Studies

In 1959, with the blessing of Signe Frydenlund, Næss published the previously unknown letters between Hamsun and her father in the journal Edda. That same year he received a Fulbright Scholarship to support a visiting appointment in the Scandinavian Studies Department at the University of Wisconsin-Madison. There he worked with Einar Haugen, an eminent linguist who would depart for Harvard in 1962. Before his departure, however, Haugen persuaded Næss to join the faculty at the University of Wisconsin as his replacement—he would later remember his successful recruitment of Næss as one of the smartest things he had ever done.

Næss was part of the Scandinavian Studies Department's expansion in the 1960s. Under his leadership, the department added graduate studies and emerged as one of the leading programs in North America. At the end of the decade, he published Knut Hamsun og Amerika (1969).

Næss' search for unknown or obscure letters by Hamsun continued in Wisconsin. At the State Historical Society, he found four letters between Hamsun and Rasmus B. Anderson, founder of Næss' department. One of Næss' students discovered nine more letters in Elroy, Wisconsin, where Hamsun briefly lived in 1882-1883. By the early 1980s, Næss' work in the United States, Norway, Sweden, Denmark, Germany, and elsewhere had yielded a collection of more than 2000 letters.

In 1983, Næss and his old colleague James McFarlane agreed that a selection should be translated into English and published. The first volume appeared in 1990, the year before Næss retired at the University of Wisconsin-Madison. He published a selection of Hamsun's letters in their original Norwegian in six volumes between 1994 and 2000.

== Personal life ==
Næss was married to Ann Mari Næss. In Wisconsin, they lived on a farm, "Maridal," near Mount Horeb. Maridal would be remembered fondly by various UW students as a gathering place for the department.

His son, Petter Næss, would later become Director of the U.S.-Norway Fulbright Foundation (2010-2024)—the same organization that sponsored Næss' initial visit to the University of Wisconsin-Madison.
