= G. V. Forsten =

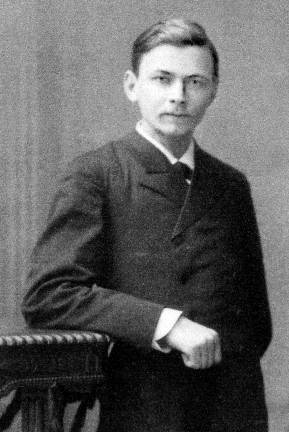
- Born: Georgīĭ Vasilevich Forsten; 30 May 1857; Fredrikshamn, Finland
- Died: 21 July (3 Aug.) 1910; Jorois, Finland
- Citizenship: Russia
- Education: Saint Petersburg University
- Known for: Historian of Scandinavia and the Baltic region

Georgīĭ Vasilevich Forsten (30 May 1857 – 21 July (3 August) 1910) was a Russo-Finnish historian and professor at Saint Petersburg University in Russia. He was a specialist in the history of Scandinavia and the Baltic region and one of the founders of research into Scandinavian history in Russia. Later he turned to the Reformation and the history of humanism in Germany.

== Early life and education ==
Georgīĭ Forsten was born in Fredrikshamn (Hamina), Finland, on 30 May 1857 to a family of Swedish origin. He was a graduate of Saint Petersburg University.

== Career ==
Forsten was a professor of Saint Petersburg University where he specialised in the history of Scandinavia and the Baltic region and was one of the founders of research into Scandinavian history in Russia. In later life his interests were in the Reformation and the history of humanism in Germany.

== Death and legacy ==
Forsten died in Jorois, Finland, on 21 July (3 Aug.) 1910. His work was discussed by V. V. Pokhlebkinin in his article "G. V. Forsten—odin iz osnovopolozhnikov izucheniia istorii Skandinavii v Rossii" in Skandinavskii sbornik (Vol. 2, 1957) and in 1979 he was the subject of a biography by Aleksandr Sergeevič Kan titled Историк Г. В. Форстен и наука его времени (Istorik G.V. Forsten i nauka ego vremeni) that was published in Moscow.

== Selected publications ==
- Bor’ba iz-za gospodstva na Baltiiskom more v XV i XVI stoletiiakh. Saint Petersburg, 1884.
- Baltiiskii vopros v XVI i XVII stoletiiakh (1544–1648), Vols. 1–2. Saint Petersburg, 1893–94.
