= Eduard Burdzhalov =

Soviet Historian (1906–1985)

Eduard Nikolaevich Burdzhalov (Russian: Эдуард Николаевич Бурджалов) (1906 – 13 December 1985) was a Soviet historian.

== Biography ==
=== Early years ===
Eduard Burdzhanov was born in Astrakhan, located on the Volga River in Russia, in 1906. His parents, middle-class ethnic Armenians, relocated to Baku, the capital of Azerbaijan, when Eduard Nikolaevich was 6. This stay proved to be short-lived, however, as the family was force to flee from Turkish violence in 1918, returning then to Astrakhan.

Burdzhalov's education was interrupted by the Russian Civil War, however, and at the age of 13 he went to work as a clerk in a military transit camp supporting the Red Army. He joined the youth section of the Communist Party, the Komsomol, in 1919.

After the Soviet regime defeated their opponents and took control of Azerbaijain in 1920, Burdzhalov and his family returned to Baku, where Eduard Nikolaevich became active in the local Komsomol organization. He resumed his education, joining the Communist Party in 1925, at the age of 19. In 1926 he was accepted into a workers' faculty (rabfak) in Moscow, part of Moscow State University (MGU). A top-tier student, Burdzhalov was made a lecturer wheile still at student, teaching in the history department the MGU rabfak and at the Kolkhoz Institute.

Burdzhalov graduated from the Moscow Institute of History, Philosophy, and Literature in 1932.

=== Career ===
In 1933, the Communist Party assigned Burdzhalov to teach at the Tula Agricultural School, operated under the aegis of the Tula city committee of the party. Burdzhalov sought the opportunity to conduct serious historical research and saw this assignment as a diversion from his goal, but nevertheless stood out as an outstanding scholar and teacher and was soon to be promoted through the academic ranks. He married a worker at the Tula Armament factory during this interval, with the couple seeing the birth of their only child, a son, in 1936.

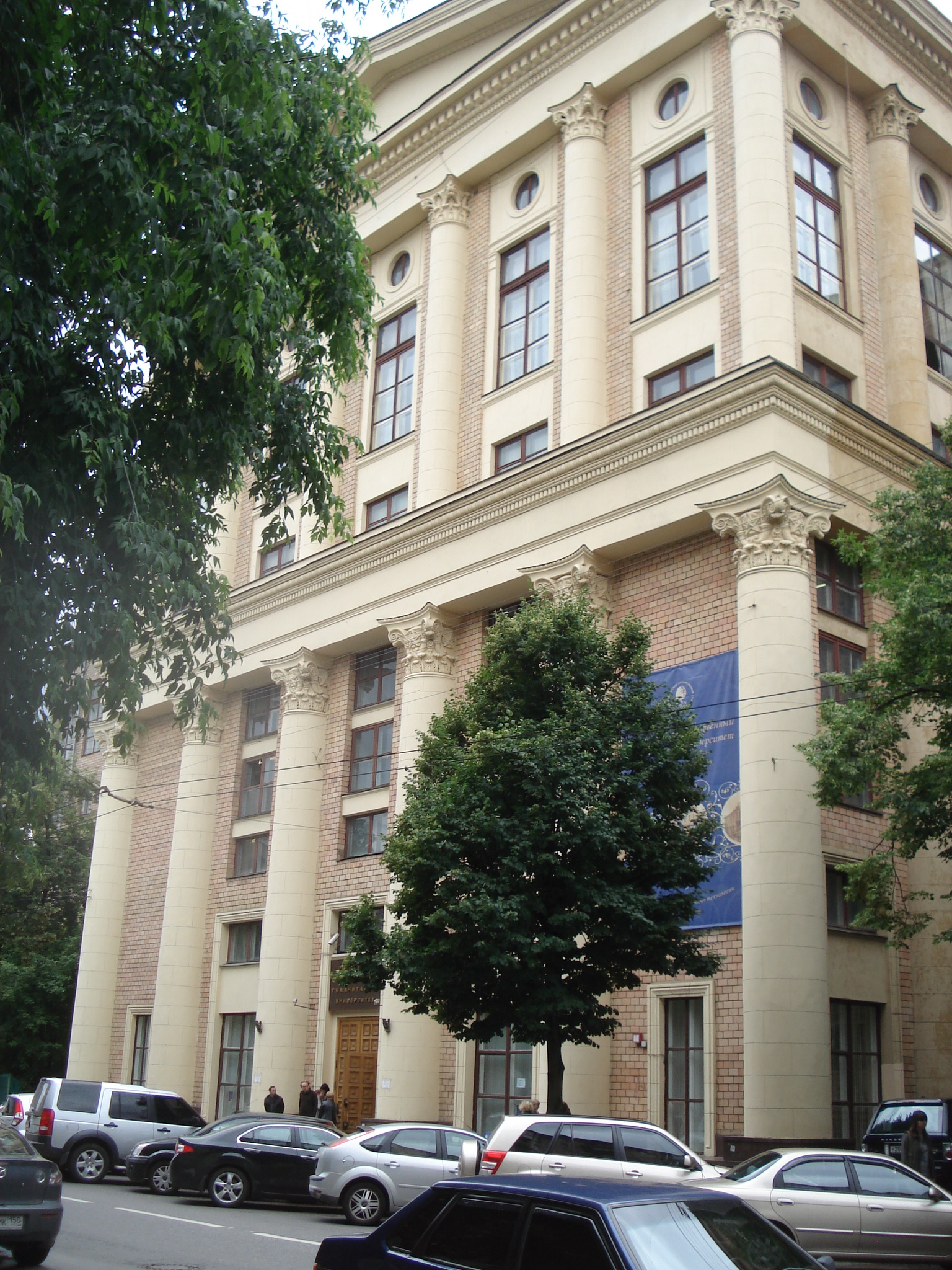
Building of the Higher Party School in Moscow, where Burdzhalov taught history before and after World War II.

Returned to Moscow that same year, Burdzhalov was assigned to the research staff in the publication of the History of the Civil War in the USSR, a major project officially edited by Joseph Stalin, Viacheslav Molotov, and Maxim Gorky, although actually written by a committee including such leading historians as Isaac Mints and Arkady Sidorov. Burdzhalov also researched and wrote his graduate dissertation, titled The Proletarian Revolution in Azerbaijan, a work later published in book form as The Twenty-Six Baku Commissars.

In the aftermath of the Great Terror of 1937–38, the path of advancement was cleared for young, freshly-trained Communists to rapidly advance in the state and party bureaucracy and academia. Budzhalov was appoined head of the Department of History of the Higher Party School under the Central Committee of the CPSU — one of the chief training universities for top party functionaries. His skill as a lecturer was adapted during the years of World War II, when Burdzhalov was assigned to the Red Army as a political lecturer, receiving numerous decorations and promotion to the rank of colonel by war's end.

During the post-war years, Burdzhalov was appointed assistant editor of Kultura i zhizh (Culture and Life), a magazine published by the Central Committee. He also returned to work as a history lecturer at the Higher Party School and at the Academy of Social Sciences, also in Moscow. A number of these lectures were published in book form between 1946 and 1953.

=== "Burdzhalov Affair" ===
In 1957 he was dismissed as deputy editor of the journal Questions of History after he published an article about the Bolshevik's confusion following the February Revolution in 1917. However in 1959 he was appointed professor.

=== Death and legacy ===
Eduard Burdzhalov died 13 December 1985.

== Publications ==
- Двадцать шесть бакинских комиссаров. [The 26 Baku Commissars] Мoscow: Госполитиздат, 1938.
- Царская Россия после восстания декабристов. [Tsarist Russia after the Decembrist Uprising: Moscow, 1940.
- Тыл помогает фронту. [The Home Front Aids the Front] Мoscow: Voennoe izdatel'stvo narkomata oborona, 1942.
- СССР в борьбе за социалистическую индустриализацию страны и коллективизацию сельского хозяйства. [The USSR in the Struggle for Socialist Industrialization of the Country and the Collectivization of Agriculture] Мoscow, 1944.
- История СССР. XVIII век. [History of the USSR: 18th Century] Contributor. Мoscow, 1946.
- История СССР. Часть III — Вторая половина XIX века — начало XX века. [History of the USSR: Part 3: Second Half of the 19th Century to Beginning of 20th Century] Contributor. Мoscow, 1946.
- Советский Союз в борьбе за завершение строительства социалистического общества и проведение сталинской конституции (1935—1937 гг.) [The Soviet Union in the Struggle to Complete the Construction of Socialist Society and Implement the Stalin Constitution (1935–1937)] Мoscow, 1951.
- Советский Союз в борьбе за завершение строительства социалистического общества и постепенный переход к коммунизму (1938—1941 гг.) [The Soviet Union in the Struggle to Complete the Construction of Socialist Society and the Gradual Transition to Communism (1938–1941)] Мoscow, 1951.
- Советская страна в период иностранной военной интервенции и гражданской войны (1918—1920 гг.) [The Soviet Natioin in the Period of Foreign Military Intervention and Civil War] Мoscow, 1952.
- СССР в период борьбы за социалистическую индустриализацию страны (1926—1929). [The USSR in the Period of Struggle for the Socialist Industrialization of the Nation (1926–1929)] With P.N. Sharova. Мoscow, 1953.
- Великая Отечественная война Советского Союза (1941—1945 гг.). Лекции, прочитанные в Высшей партийной школе при ЦК КПСС. М., 1953;
- "О тактике большевиков в марте — апреле 1917 года." ["On Bolshevik Tactics in March–April 1917"], Voprosy istorii, 1956. No. 4.
- "Ещё о тактике большевиков в марте — апреле 1917 года." ["Again on Bolshevik Tactics in March–April 1917"], Voprosy istorii, 1956. No. 8.
- Вторая русская революция: Восстание в Петрограде. [The Second Russian Revolution: The Uprising in Petrograd] Мoscow, 1967.
- Вторая русская революция. Москва. Фронт. Периферия. [The Second Russian Revolution: Moscow, Front, Periphery] Мoscow, 1971.
- Russia's Second Revolution: The February 1917 Uprising in Petrograd. Donald J. Raleigh, ed. and trans. Bloomington, IN: Indiana University Press, 1987.
