= Nikolai Rubinshtein =

Soviet economic historian (1897–1963)

Nikolai Rubinshtein

Nikolai Leonidovich Rubinshtein (23 December 1897 – 26 January 1963) was a Soviet historian known for his historiographical works and his research into the economic history of Russia and the formation of capitalism in that country.

== Early life and education ==
Rubinshtein was born on 23 December [O.S. 11 December] 1897 in Odessa. He received his advanced education at Novorossiia University in Odessa from which he graduated in 1922.

== Career ==
Rubinshtein taught at higher educational institutions in Moscow from 1934 to 1959 and became a professor in 1938. He was appointed deputy scientific director of the State Historical Museum from in 1943 in which position he served until 1949. He joined the Communist Party in 1944.

He is best known for his historiographical works and his research into the economic history of Russia and the formation of capitalism in that country. He also wrote on the history of popular movements in Ukraine in the 17th century.

A Jew, Rubinshtein was one of the historians that Arkadiĭ Sidorov campaigned against as part of Joseph Stalin's drive against the "rootless cosmopolitans", most of whom were Jewish.

== Death ==
Rubinshtein died in Moscow on 26 January 1963.

== Selected publications ==
- Russkaia istoriografiia. Moscow, 1941.
