= Ernst Ekman =

Multilingual, Scandinavian Historian and Advocate of Western Civilization

Ernst Ekman (1926 - 13 October 1981) was a specialist in Scandinavian history at the University of California Riverside. Born in Chicago of Swedish descent, Ekman was multi-lingual, a meticulous historian, and an advocate of the benefits of a broad education in the history of Western Civilisation.

== Early life and education ==
Ernst Ekman was born in Chicago in 1926 of Swedish descent. He was schooled in Glendale, California, after which he attended Jonathan Edwards College at Yale University from where he received his A.B. in 1948. He studied at Gotesborgs Hogskola in Sweden before joining the University of Minnesota from where he was awarded the degree of M.A. in Scandinavian Area Studies. He subsequently received his Ph.D. in History from UCLA in 1954.

He married Iris with whom he had two sons, Anders and Jonathan.

== Career ==
Ekman was a specialist in Scandinavian history at the University of California Riverside. His main period of interest was from the Reformation to the Thirty Years' War and he was a regular contributor to The Journal of Modern History and the yearbooks of the American Swedish Historical Museum in the 1960s.

He was an advocate of the benefits of a broad education in the history of Western Civilisation, which he taught at Riverside, and a meticulous historian much interested in sources and historiography, contributing an article on "The Teaching of Scandinavian History in the United States" to Scandinavian Studies in 1965 in which he surveyed scholars, institutions, and the availability of sources on Scandinavia in the United States and noted that some important publications were only available at the Library of Congress or the New York Public Library. He was a regular reviewer in scholarly journals and contributed to The Encyclopedia Americana on Gustaf VI Adolf of Sweden.

== Death ==
Ekman died suddenly on 13 October 1981.

== Selected publications ==
- "The Danish Royal Law of 1665", The Journal of Modern History, Vol. 29, No. 2 (June 1957), pp. 102–107.
- "Henrik Pontoppidan as a Critic of Modern Danish Society", Scandinavian Studies, Vol. 29, No. 4 (Nov. 1957), pp. 170–183.
- "A Southern California Booster Letter: Sent Home to Sweden in 1889", The Historical Society of Southern California Quarterly, Vol. 43, No. 3 (September, 1961), pp. 298–302.
- "Gothic Patriotism and Olof Rudbeck", The Journal of Modern History, Vol. 34, No. 1 (March 1962), pp. 52–63.
- "A Swedish View in 1826 of American Character", American Quarterly, Vol. 14, No. 3 (Autumn, 1962), pp. 495–499.
- "The Teaching of Scandinavian History in the United States", Scandinavian Studies, Vol. 37, No. 3 (August 1965), pp. 259–270.
- "Three Decades of Research on Gustavus Adolphus", The Journal of Modern History, Vol. 38, No. 3 (Sep., 1966), pp. 243–255.
- "Saint-Barthélemy et la Révolution française", Bulletin de la Société d'Histoire de la Guadeloupe, Issue 7, 1er semestre 1967, pp. 19–37.
- "A Swedish View of Chicago in the 1890s: Henning Berger", Swedish Pioneer Historical Quarterly, Vol. 25 (1974), pp. 230–40.
- "Sweden, the Slave Trade and Slavery, 1784-1847", Outre-Mers. Revue d'histoire, Année Vol. LXII (1975), No. 226-227, pp. 221–231.
