= Pochinki, Gorokhovetsky District, Vladimir Oblast =

Pochinki Починки
- Village
- Location within Vladimir Oblast Location within Russia
- Coordinates: 55°59′N 42°25′E
- Country: Russia
- Region: Vladimir Oblast
- District: Gorokhovetsky District
- Time zone: UTC+3:00

Pochinki (Russian: Починки) is a rural locality (a village) in Fominskoye Rural Settlement, Gorokhovetsky District, Vladimir Oblast, Russia. The population was 13 as of 2010.

== Geography ==
The village is located 5 km north-east from Fominki, 38 km south-west from Gorokhovets.
