= V. S. Lelchuk =

Russian historian (born 1929)

Vitaly Lelchuk
- Лельчук Виталий Семенович
- Born: 1929 (age 96–97); Saint Petersburg
- Occupation: Historian

Academic background
- Education: Moscow State University (1952)

Academic work
- Era: Soviet and post-Soviet
- Institutions: Moscow State University; USSR Academy of Sciences; State Academic University for Humanities
- Notable works: Industrializat︠s︡ii︠a︡ SSSR--istorii︠a︡, opyt, problemy (1984)

Vitaly Semenovich Lelchuk (Russian: Лельчук Виталий Семенович; born 1929) is a Russian historian who is a specialist in the Soviet model of industrialisation, scientific and technological revolution, and the history of the USSR. He graduated from Moscow State University where he also taught before moving to the Institute of History of the USSR Academy of Sciences. He later joined the State Academic University for Humanities (GAUGN) in Moscow where he was deputy dean of the Faculty of History.

== Early life and education ==
Lelchuk was born in 1929 to a Jewish family in Saint Petersburg. He received his advanced education at Moscow State University (MSU), from which he graduated in 1952.

== Career ==
From 1952 to 1959, Lelchuk taught history at MSU and from 1959 at the Institute of History of the USSR Academy of Sciences, later becoming deputy dean of the Faculty of History of the State Academic University for the Humanities (GAUGN) in Moscow. He was chairman of the editorial board of National History.

Lelchuk specialises in the Soviet model of industrialisation, scientific and technological revolution, and the history of the USSR generally.

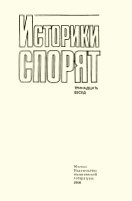
Istoriki sporjat Trinadcat' besed (1988)

He wrote a number of books on the early industrialisation effort of the Soviet Union, starting with a study of the Soviet chemical industry, Sozdanie khimicheskoĭ promyshlennosti SSSR; iz istorii sot︠s︡ialisticheskoĭ industrializat︠s︡ii, in 1964. With respect to Lenin's New Economic Policy, Lelchuk argued that its mixed results were a consequence of a failure to set clear objectives due to ideological differences and a power struggle within the Communist Party, rather than structural problems in the Soviet economy.

His 1984 survey of Soviet industrialisation in the 1920s and 30s, Industrializat︠s︡ii︠a︡ SSSR--istorii︠a︡, opyt, problemy, was praised by Hiroaki Kuromiya in The Russian Review for its innovative approach in covering not only the economic problems faced by the Soviet Union but the social ones too, making the work valuable to social historians.

He wrote a short history of Soviet society with Yury Polyakov and Anatoly Protopopov that was published by Progress Publishers in 1971 and translated into French (1972) and English (1977). He took an interest in historiography and in 1988, during the period of the collapse of the USSR when the whole corpus of Soviet history was being re-evaluated under what has been called an "historical glasnost", participated in a roundtable discussion by dissident, establishment and revisionist historians of pressing historiographical problems such as access to archives, the treatment of Stalinism, and political rehabilitations. The same year, he edited Istoriki sporjat: Trinadcat' besed (Historians argue: Thirteen conversations). He also published three edited works on the Soviet Union during the Cold War (1995, 1998, 2000), part of new scholarship assisted by the opening of Soviet archives.

== Selected publications ==
=== Articles and chapters ===
- "O nekotorykh lyudyakh v riadakh khimicheskoy promyshlennosti SSSR, 1917–1937", in Formirovaniye i razvitiye sovetskogo rabochegogo klassa (1917–1961 gg.) Nauka, Moscow, 1964.
- "1926–1940 gody: zavershennaya industrializatsiya ili promyshlennyi ryvok", Istoriya SSSR, 4 (1990), pp. 3–25.
- "20-30-e gody. Politika industrializacija", Kommunist, 1990, No. 16, pp. 90–93.
- "Lessons from Gorodetsky (on the occasion of his 90th birthday)", Russian History, 1997, No. 1, p. 122.

=== Books ===
- Tam, gde nachinaetsi͡a kommunizm : KPSS – organizator i rukovoditelʹ vsenarodnogo dvizhenii͡a za kommunisticheskiĭ trud. Znanie, Moscow, 1961. (With E. Ė. Beĭlina)
- Sozdanie khimicheskoĭ promyshlennosti SSSR; iz istorii sot︠s︡ialisticheskoĭ industrializat︠s︡ii. Nauka, Moscow, 1964.
- Smeniv mechi na orala : rasskaz o 4-ĭ pi︠a︡tiletke (1946–1950 gg). Moscow, 1967.
- Istoriia sovetskogo obchtchestva. Progress Publishers, Moscow, 1971. (With Yriĭ Polyakov & Anatoliĭ Protopopov) French edition Histoire de la société soviétique (1972) and English A Short History of Soviet Society (1977).
- Sot︠s︡ialisticheskai︠a︡ industrializat︠s︡ii︠a︡ SSSR i ee osveshchenie v sovetskoĭ istoriografii. Nauka, Moscow, 1975.
- Promyshlennostʹ i rabochiĭ klass SSSR v uslovii︠a︡kh NTR. Vysshai︠a︡ shkola, Moscow, 1982. (With E. Ė. Beĭlina)
- Industrializat︠s︡ii︠a︡ SSSR – istorii︠a︡, opyt, problemy. Izd-vo polit. lit-ry, Moscow, 1984.
- Shagi sovetskoĭ industrii: k 60-letii͡u XIV sʺezda VKP(b). Znanie, Moscow, 1985. (With U.M. Azizov)
- Nauchno-tekhnicheskai︠a︡ revoli︠u︡t︠s︡ii︠a︡ i promyshlennoe razvitie SSSR. Nauka, Moscow. 1987. ISBN 5020084344
- Istoriki sporjat: Trinadcat' besed. Politizdat, Moscow, 1988. (Editor)
- SSSR i kholodnai︠a︡ voĭna. Mosgorarkhiv, Moscow, 1995. (Edited with Efim I. Pivovar) ISBN 5722800171
- Poslevoennaja konversija: k istorii "cholodnoj vojny": sbornik dokumentov. Institute of Russian History, Russian Academy of Sciences, Moscow, 1998. (Edited and compiled with Mark A. Molodt︠s︡ygin) ISBN 9785201147440
- Sovetskoi obshchestvo: Budni Kholodnoi voiny: Materialy "kruglogo stola". Ran, Moscow, 2000. (Edited with G. Sh. Sagatelian)
