= Istoricheskie Zapiski =

Istoricheskie zapiski
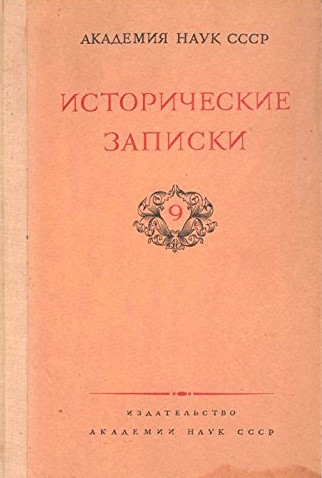
- Discipline: History
- Language: Russian

Publication details
- History: 1937
- Publisher: Progress for Russian Academy of Sciences (Russia)

Standard abbreviations
- ISO 4: Istor. Zap.

Indexing
- ISSN: 0130-6685
- OCLC no.: 1754039

Istoricheskie Zapiski (Исторические записки) (Historical Transactions), also known as ИЗ, is an academic journal of history published by Progress Publishers in Moscow for the Russian Academy of Sciences and its predecessors since 1937. The journal specialises in medieval and modern Russian history and until 1957 was one of just three journals available to Soviet historians, the others being Voprosy Istorii, which took a more historiographical approach, and Vestnik Drevnei Istorii which dealt with ancient history.

Boris Grekov was the first editor from 1937 to 1953, who was replaced by Arkadi Sidorov in 1954.

It is not to be confused with the work by the same name of Mikhail Gershenzon, first published in 1910, with 2nd edition in 1923.
