= Soviet Historical Encyclopedia =

- Author: Team of authors
- Language: Russian
- Publisher: State Scientific Publishing House "Soviet Encyclopedia"
- Publication date: 1961–1976
- Media type: Paper

The Soviet Historical Encyclopedia is the Soviet encyclopedia of the Academy of Sciences of the Soviet Union (1961–1976) on the history of peoples of the whole world until the 70s of the 20th century.

== Content ==
Includes articles-terms on the history of the Soviet Union and foreign countries, especially on recent history. Many articles are given detailed chronologies, which are integral parts of articles devoted to the Soviet Union, Union republics and foreign countries.

Articles are accompanied by statistical tables, maps (historical, political, ethnographic), diagrams, illustrations.

== Editors ==
- Editor-in-Chief – Evgeny Zhukov.

In different years, the members of the main editorial board were:

- Evgeny Boltin;
- Vyacheslav Volgin;
- Volina (Executive Secretary);
- Bobojan Gafurov;
- Alexander Huber;
- Jan Zutis;
- Abgar Ioannisyan;
- Kuznetsov;
- Lavrov;
- Isaac Mintz;
- Gennady Obichkin;
- Pokrovsky;
- Ivan Potekhin;
- Arkady Sidorov;
- Vasily Struve;
- Mikhail Tikhomirov;
- Sergey Tokarev;
- Vladimir Khvostov.

== Volumes ==
Volume	Title	Year of Publishing	Number of Pages
1	Aaltonen – Ayan	1961	530
2	Baal – Washington	1962	517
3	Washington – Vyachko	1963	516
4	Hague – Dvin	1963	542
5	Dvinsk – Indonesia	1964	492
6	Indra – Caracas	1965	521
7	Karakeev – Koshaker	1965	520
8	Koshala – Malta	1965	509
9	Malta – Nakhimov	1966	508
10	Nachimson – Pergamum	1967	534
11	Pergamum – Renuven	1968	521
12	Reparations – Slavs	1969	496
13	Slavic Studies – Xia Chen	1971	530
14	Taanah – Feleo	1973	524
15	Fellahi – Zhalaynor	1974	510
16	Zhang Wen-Tien – Yashtukh	1976	509

== Sources ==
- Soviet Historical Encyclopedia // Soviet Encyclopedia of the History of Ukraine: in 4 Volumes / Editor-in-Chief Andrey Skaba – Kiev: The Main Edition of the Ukrainian Soviet Encyclopedia, 1972 – Volume 4 – Page 130
