= Pochinki, Gus-Khrustalny District, Vladimir Oblast =

Pochinki Починки
- Village
- Location within Vladimir Oblast Location within Russia
- Coordinates: 55°37′N 40°58′E
- Country: Russia
- Region: Vladimir Oblast
- District: Gus-Khrustalny District
- Time zone: UTC+3:00

Pochinki (Russian: Починки) is a rural locality (a village) in Posyolok Zolotkovo, Gus-Khrustalny District, Vladimir Oblast, Russia. The population was 13 as of 2010.

== Geography ==
Pochinki is located 23 km east of Gus-Khrustalny (the district's administrative centre) by road. Chyokovo is the nearest rural locality.
