= Pochinki, Ivanovo Oblast =

Pochinki Починки
- Village
- Location within Ivanovo Oblast Location within Russia
- Coordinates: 57°01′N 41°09′E
- Country: Russia
- Region: Ivanovo Oblast
- District: Ivanovsky District
- Time zone: UTC+3:00

Pochinki (Russian: Починки) is a rural locality, also a village in Ivanovsky District, Ivanovo Oblast, Russia. Population: 6 (2010 census);

== Geography ==
This rural locality is located 12 kilometres (7.5 mi) from Ivanovo (the district's administrative centre and capital of Ivanovo Oblast) and 256 kilometres (159 mi) from Moscow. Yurkino is the nearest rural locality.
