= Andrei Volobuyev =

Russian footballer

Personal information
- Full name: Andrei Aleksandrovich Volobuyev
- Date of birth: 22 September 1984 (age 42)
- Height: 1.88 m (6 ft 2 in)
- Position: Forward

Senior career*
Years	Team	Apps	(Gls)
2005–2006	FC Sochi-04	21	(7)
2006	FC Energetik Uren	6	(0)
2007–2009	FC Mashuk-KMV Pyatigorsk	35	(8)
2009	→ FC Zodiak-Oskol Stary Oskol (loan)	6	(1)
2010	FC Dynamo Stavropol	6	(1)
- * Club domestic league appearances and goals

Andrei Aleksandrovich Volobuyev (Russian: Андрей Александрович Волобуев; born 22 September 1984) is a former Russian professional football player.

== Club career ==
He played two seasons in the Russian Football National League for FC Mashuk-KMV Pyatigorsk.
