= Yanaturmysh =

Yanaturmysh Rural district
- Location within Kazakhstan
- Coordinates: 43°31′43.99″N 77°44′59.64″E
- Country: Kazakhstan
- Enbekshikazakh Region: Almaty Region

Government
  - Akim: Marat Aitakunov
- Time zone: UTC+5 (+5 UTC)
- Area code: +772776

Yanaturmysh is a village in Almaty Region south-eastern of Kazakhstan. It is located in the Enbekshikazakh District, approximately 75 kilometers north-east of Almaty.
