= Sergei Volobuyev =

Russian footballer

Personal information
- Full name: Sergei Vasilyevich Volobuyev
- Date of birth: 27 October 1972 (age 54)
- Height: 1.86 m (6 ft 1 in)
- Positions: Defender; midfielder

Youth career
- ShISP Stavropol

Senior career*
| Years | Team | Apps | (Gls) |
| 1990–1992 | FC Dynamo-APK Izobilny | 71 | (1) |
| 1992–1995 | FC Dynamo Stavropol | 15 | (0) |
| 1994–1995 | → FC Dynamo-d Stavropol (loans) | 24 | (0) |
| 1995 | FC Chernomorets Novorossiysk | 2 | (0) |
| 1995 | FC Anzhi Makhachkala | 9 | (0) |
| 1996–1997 | FC Kuban Slavyansk-na-Kubani | 29 | (1) |
| 1998–1999 | FC Balakovo | 48 | (3) |
| 2000 | FC Forpost Vladivostok | | |
| 2000 | FC Reformatsiya Abakan | 9 | (0) |
| 2000 | FC Luch Vladivostok | 4 | (0) |
- * Club domestic league appearances and goals

Sergei Vasilyevich Volobuyev (Russian: Сергей Васильевич Волобуев; born 27 October 1972) is a former Russian football player.
