= Yevgenyevka, Almaty Region =

Yevgenyevka
- Location within Kazakhstan
- Coordinates: 43°30′40.36″N 77°40′28.35″E
- Country: Kazakhstan
- Region: Almaty Region
- Time zone: UTC+5

Yevgenyevka (Kazakh: Евгеньевка) is a former village in Enbekshikazakh District, Almaty Region, Kazakhstan. It was located approximately 75 kilometres (47 mi) north-east of Almaty. In 1985 Yevgenyevka was merged with the village of Malovodnoye which was renamed Baidibek Bi in 2014.
