= The League of Youth =

Play by Henrik Ibsen

The League of Youth (Norwegian: De unges Forbund) is a play by Henrik Ibsen finished in early May 1869. It was Ibsen's first play in colloquial prose and marks a turning point in his style towards realism and away from verse. It was widely considered Ibsen's most popular play in nineteenth-century Norway. Though rooted in serious events of the time, the play was lauded for its natural and witty dialogue, cynical humour and farcical intrigue.

== Summary ==
Taking a different tack than Ibsen's earlier political play The Pretenders, The League of Youth features a protagonist Stensgaard, who poses as a political idealist and gathers a new party around him, the 'League of Youth', and aims to eliminate corruption among the "old" guard and bring his new "young" group to power. In scheming to be elected, he immerses himself in social and sexual intrigue, culminating in such complexity that at the end of the play all the women whom he has at one time planned to marry reject him, his plans for election fail, and he is run out of town.

== Productions ==
The initial evening's stage production saw loud applause and glowing reviews by critics in the papers. However, by the second performance, both Conservatives and Liberals were saying it was an attack on their party. When both sides showed up for the second performance, a loud ruckus forced the manager to plead for calm and there were continual interruptions. At the play's end, the gas lights were turned off to force the unruly mob out of the theater with fighting continuing into the streets.

Though popular and often produced in Scandinavia it has rarely been staged elsewhere. There have been three known productions in the UK: on a Sunday evening in 1900 a single performance by the Stage Society with Granville Barker as Erik, Robert Farquharson as Bastian and Edward Knoblock as a waiter. The first ever professional production of the play, in a version by Andy Barrett (published by Nick Hern Books), premiered on 13 May 2011 at Nottingham Playhouse. In 2016 London based theatre company Riot Act produced a critically acclaimed modern adaption (by playwright Ashley Pearson) in collaboration with Theatre N16 in South London. The production gave the play a New Order-scored aggressive resuscitation which mirrored modern UK politics and was directed by Whit Hertford. In the United States, a professional production (adaptation by Jeffrey Hatcher) was produced at The Commonweal Theatre in Lanesboro, Minnesota in 2016.

== Criticism ==
Ibsen biographer Robert Ferguson argues that the play is funny because it is liberated from Ibsen's later famous preoccupation with the power of symbol and making every line relevant to the main issue. As Ferguson says, "This is Ibsen's most Holbergian play, a comedy on human weakness which does not, like some of his later plays on weakness, end in the punishment of the weak."

It's been described as "Peer Gynt in politics".

== Real persons and places ==
It was thought at the time Ibsen may have modeled his character Stensgaard on the rival dramatist and Liberal party leader Bjornstjerne Bjornson, however Ibsen denied any such connection and wrote a letter of apology to Bjornson, but it would be eleven years before their former friendship would be healed.

The central character Stensgaard was in fact based on the real-life figure of Herman Bagger, an outsider who arrived in the town of Skien in the 1830s, dabbled in journalism, was elected to political office and was even involved with a scandal involving an IOU note. Other real-life caricatures include that of Daniel Hejre, which was an affectionate portrait of Ibsen's father. Aslaksen the printer was based on a friend of Ibsen's from youth named N.F. Axelsen who printed the paper The Man, which Ibsen had edited for nine months.
