= Langhe Ceretto Prize =

- Native name: Premio Langhe Ceretto
- Description: Literary award bestowed to books dealing with food and viticulture
- Country: Italy

The Langhe Ceretto Prize (Italian: Premio Langhe Ceretto, after Langhe region and Ceretto family of wine-makers) is a literary award, introduced in 1991 and bestowed by a jury of international experts to books dealing with food and viticulture.
