= MSU Faculty of History =

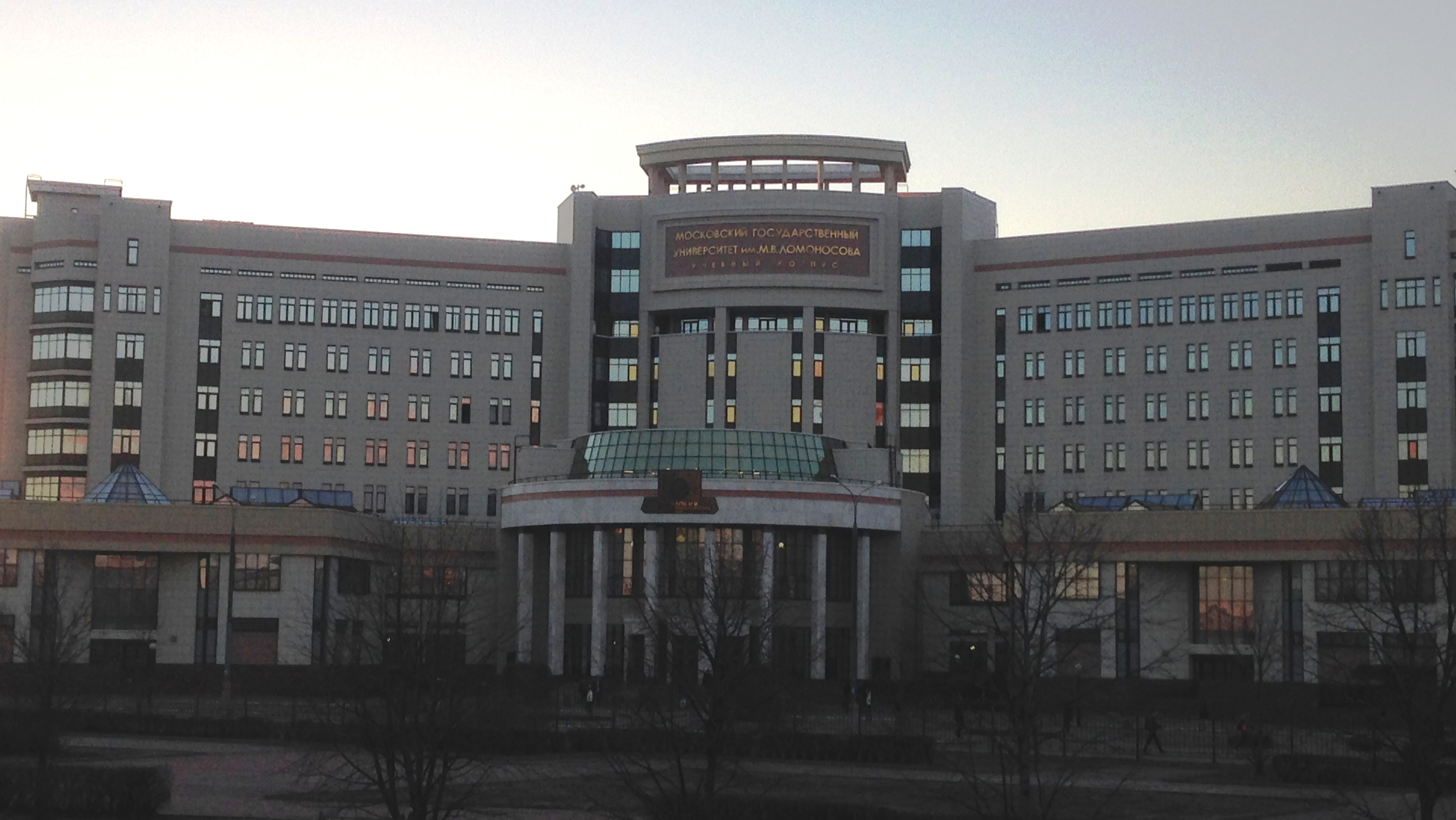
- Faculty building
- Type: Public
- Established: 1934
- Location: Moscow, Russia; 55°42′00″N 37°31′46″E
- Campus: Urban
- Affiliations: MSU
- Website: hist.msu.ru

The Faculty of History is one of the faculties of the Moscow State University. Established at 1934 on the base of the Historical-philological faculty of the university. The dean of the faculty was Sergey Karpov (1995–2018).

== History ==
The first departments of the history, arts and archaeology of the Moscow State University were established at 1804. In 1835, the Department of History was separated into the Department of Russian History and the Department of Foreign History. The department of Russian History was led by Mikhail Pogodin, Sergei Solovyov, Vasily Klyuchevsky, the department of foreign history was led by Timofey Granovsky. At 1850 the historical-philological faculty was created.

After the October Revolution the Faculty of history and the Faculty of law were mixed into the Faculty of social sciences. At 1925 it was reorganized into a Faculty of Soviet Law and Ethnology. At the 1931 the Historical-philological faculty was transformed into Moscow Institute of Philology, Literature and History.

At 1934 the Faculties of history in Moscow State University and in Saint Petersburg University were restored.

== Structure ==
- Department of Ancient Languages
- Department of Ancient World History
- Department of Archaeology
- Department of Church History
- Department of Ethnology
- Department of Foreign Languages
- Department of Historical Informatics
- Department of History of Domestic Art
- Department of History of Near Abroad Countries
- Department of History of Social Movements and Political Parties
- Department of History of Southern and Western Slavs
- Department of Medieval History
- Department of Modern and Contemporary History
- Department of Russian History from the 19th Century to the Beginning of the 20th Century
- Department of Russian History from the 20th to the 21st Centuries
- Department of Russian History up to the Beginning of the 19th Century
- Department of Source Studies
- Department of World History of Arts

== Notable faculty ==
- Timofey Granovsky
- Sergey Karpov
- Oleg Khlevniuk
- Leonid Milov
- Nikita Petrov
- Boris Rybakov
- Arkadiĭ Sidorov
- Sergey Solovyov
- Sergei Tokarev
- Valentin Yanin
- Anna Melyukova

== Notable alumni ==
- Lyudmila Alexeyeva, (1927–2018), Russian human rights activist
- Svetlana Aliluyeva, (1926–2011), the youngest child and the only daughter of Joseph Stalin
- Sergei Bodrov Jr., (1971–2002), Russian actor
- Olga Kabo, (born 1968), Russian actress
- Yuri Knorozov, (1922–1999), Soviet linguist and ethnographer, who is known for his role in the decipherment of the Maya script
- Victor Schnirelmann, (born 1949), Russian historian and ethnologist
- Nikolai Svanidze, (born 1955), Russian TV and radio host
- Savva Yamshchikov, (1938–2009), Russian restorer
- Valentin Yanin (born 1929), leading Russian historian and archaeologist
- Konstantin Zatulin, (born 1958), Russian politician
