= Isaak Mints =

Soviet historian (1896–1991)

- Исаа́к Изра́илевич Минц
- Born: February 3, 1896; Krinichki, Yekaterinoslav uezd, Yekaterinoslav Governorate, Russian Empire
- Died: April 5, 1991 (aged 95); Moscow, Soviet Union
- Occupation: Historian

Academic background
- Education: Institute of Red Professors

Isaak Izrailevich Mints (Russian: Исаа́к Изра́илевич Минц, Ukrainian: Ісак Ізраїльович Мінц; 3 February 1896 – 5 April 1991) was the leading Soviet historian in the early and mid-twentieth century. In 1949 he lost most of his academic positions as part of the campaign against the "rootless cosmopolitans", a Soviet euphemism for Jews. Nevertheless, he had eventually become an "ideal Soviet Jew" due to his adherence to the Soviet "party line".

== Biography ==
Isaak Mints was born in Krinichki in the Russian Empire. (Note: Now Krynychky, Ukraine)

Mints was the leading Soviet historian in the early and mid-twentieth century. In 1949 he lost most of his academic positions following a campaign against him by his colleague Arkady Sidorov that was part of the drive by Joseph Stalin to eliminate the "rootless cosmopolitans", most of whom were Jewish. Despite this, in 1953 he arranged for Soviet Jews to write a letter to Pravda condemning Zionism, Israel, and the "doctors' plot".

== Selected publications ==
- Istoriia Velikogo Oktiabria (History of the Great October) (3 vols.)
