= Yevgenyevka, Russia =

Yevgenyevka (Russian: Евге́ньевка) is the name of several rural localities in Russia:

- Yevgenyevka, Belgorod Oblast, a selo in Gubkinsky District of Belgorod Oblast
- Yevgenyevka, Kursk Oblast, a selo in Azarovsky Selsoviet of Kastorensky District of Kursk Oblast
- Yevgenyevka, Novosibirsk Oblast, a village in Tatarsky District of Novosibirsk Oblast
