= Scandinavica (journal) =

- Discipline: Scandinavian studies
- Language: English

Publication details
- History: 1962–present
- Publisher: Norvik Press (U.K.)
- Frequency: biannual

Standard abbreviations
- ISO 4: Scandinavica

Indexing
- ISSN: 0036-5653

Links
- Journal homepage

Scandinavica: An international journal of Scandinavian studies is a semiannual journal of Scandinavian studies.
