= Russian History (RAS journal) =

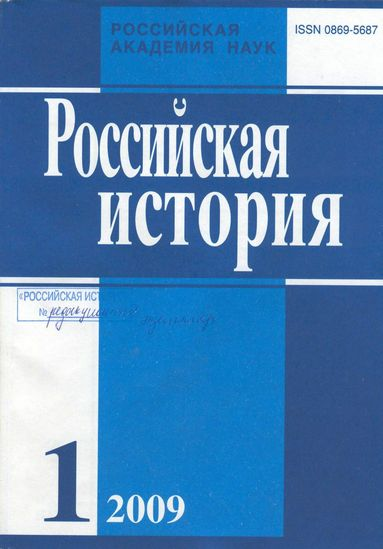
- Discipline: History
- Language: Russian

Publication details
- History: 1957
- Publisher: Russian Academy of Sciences (Russia)
- Frequency: Bi-monthly

Standard abbreviations
- ISO 4: Ross. Istor.

Indexing
- ISSN: 0869-5687

Links
- Journal homepage

Russian History (Russian: Российская история, romanized: Rossiiskaya istoriia), formerly named History of the USSR (Russian: История СССР, romanized: Istoriia SSSR) (1957–1992) and National History (Russian: Отечественная история, romanized: Otechestvennaia istoriia) (1992–2008), is a journal of the Institute of History of the Russian Academy of Sciences (RAS). It is indexed in Web of Science and Scopus.
