= Voprosy Istorii =

Вопросы истории
- Discipline: History
- Language: Russian

Publication details
- History: 1926 to 1941 (as Istorik-Marksist), 1931 to 1936 (as Borba Klassov), 1937 to 1945 (as Istoricheskii Zhurnal), 1945 to present (as Voprosy Istorii)
- Publisher: Institute of General History of the Russian Academy of Sciences (Russia)

Standard abbreviations
- ISO 4: Vopr. Istor.

Indexing
- ISSN: 0042-8779

Links
- Journal homepage

Voprosy Istorii (Russian: Вопросы истории; transl. Questions of History) is a Russian academic journal for historical studies. It is published monthly by the Institute of General History of the Russian Academy of Sciences. The journal covers both Russian and world history.

== History ==
The current publication started as two separate journals. The first publication, Marxist Historian (Russian: Историк-марксист), was published from 1926 to 1941. The second publication, begun in 1931, was known as Bor'ba Klassov (Russian: Борьба классов), but in 1937 changed its name to Istoricheskii Zhurnal (Russian: Исторический журнал). Marxist Historian was merged into Istoricheskii Zhurnal in 1941. In 1945 the journal's name was changed to the current Voprosy Istorii.

In 1957 the Russian historian Édourd Burdzhalov was dismissed as deputy editor of the journal after he published an article about the Bolshevik's confusion following the February Revolution in 1917. At that time, it was one of just three journals available to Soviet historians, the others being Istoricheskie Zapiski, which specialised in medieval and modern Russian history, and Vestnik Drevnei Istorii which dealt with ancient history.

In 2004, East View began to digitise the journal from its 200,000 pages in 950 issues.

== List of editors-in-chief ==
The editors-in-chief of Voprosy Istorii have been:

=== Marxist Historian ===
- 1926–1930: Andrei Vasilievich Shestakov
- 1930–1932: Mikhail Nikolaevich Pokrovskiy
- 1933–1938: Nikolai Mikhailovich Lukin
- 1938–1944: Emeliyan Mikhailovich Yaroslavskiy

=== Voprosy Istorii ===
- 1945–1949: Vyacheslav Petrovich Volgin
- 1949–1950: Alexander Dmitrievich Udaltsov
- 1950–1953: Petr Nikolaevich Tretyakov
- 1953–1957: Anna Mikhailovna Pankratova
- 1958–1960: Sergei Fedorovich Naida
- 1960–1987: Vladimir Grigorievich Trukhanovskiy
- 1987–2017: Akhmed Akhmedovich Iskenderov
- Since 2017: P. A. Iskenderov

=== Editions available on line ===
- [ No. 7, 1947]

== See also ==
- List of history journals
