= Communist Academy =

Higher education and research institute in Russia (1918–1936)

- Коммунистическая академия
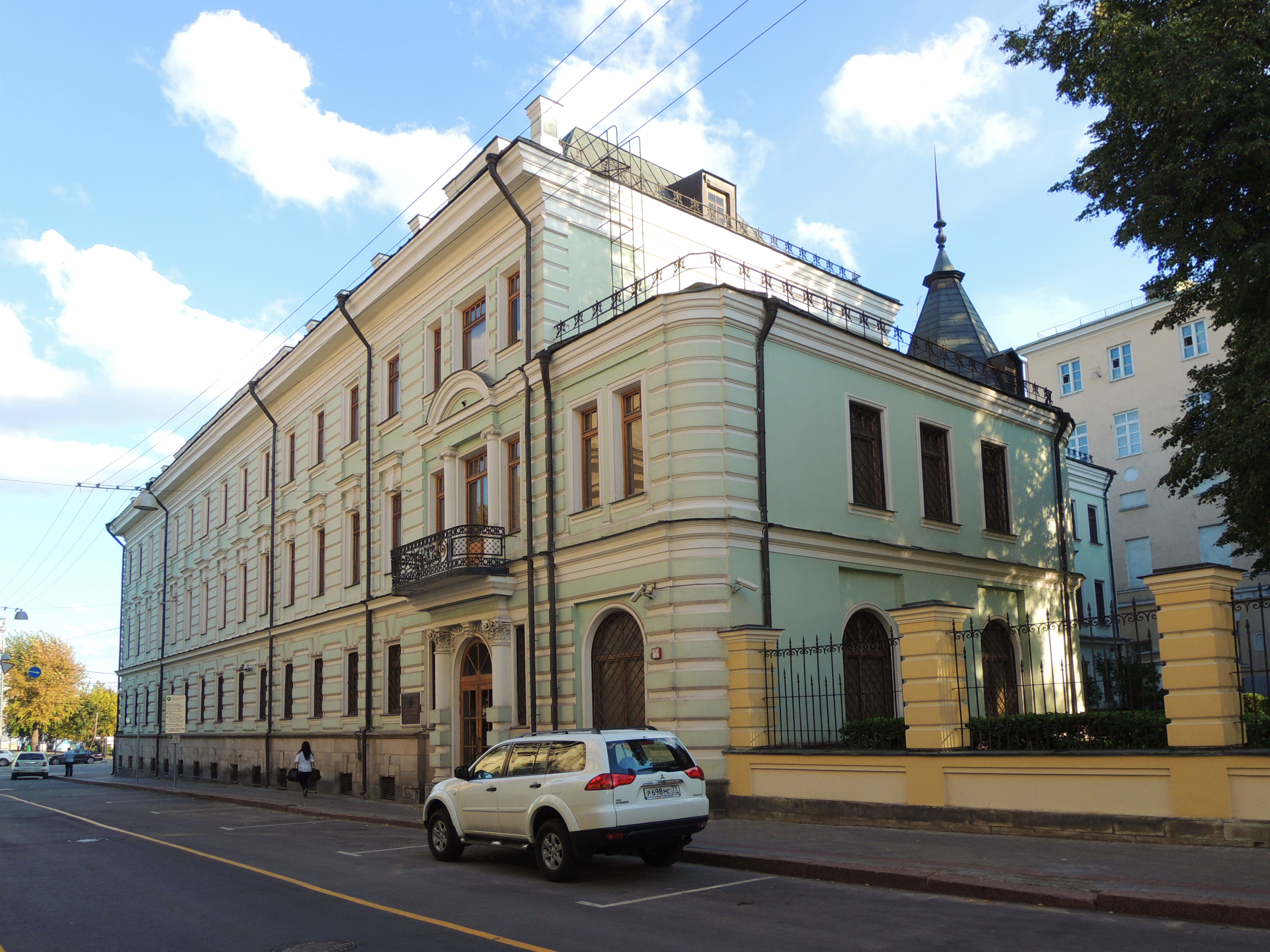
- The former building of the Communist Academy in Khamovniki District, Moscow
- Abbreviation: Комакадемия
- Predecessor: SAON
- Merged into: АН СССР
- Formation: 17 April 1924
- Dissolved: 8 February 1936
- Type: Scientific institution
- Headquarters: Moscow
- Official language: Russian
- Formerly called: Socialist Academy of Social Sciences

The Communist Academy (Russian: Коммунистическая академия, transliterated Kommunisticheskaya akademiya) was a higher educational establishment and research institute based in Moscow. It included scientific institutes of philosophy, history, literature, art and language, Soviet construction and law, world economy and world politics, economics, agrarian research, as well as institutes of natural and social science. It was intended to allow Marxists to research problems independent of, and implicitly in rivalry with, the Academy of Sciences which long pre-existed the October Revolution and the subsequent formation of the Soviet Union.

== The Socialist Academy ==
The Communist Academy was preceded by the Socialist Academy of Social Sciences when it was founded on June 25, 1918, by decree of the All-Russian Central Executive Committee. The chairman of the academy was Mikhail Pokrovsky. On 15 April 1919, the name of the academy was shortened to the Socialist Academy.

== The Communist Academy ==
From April 17, 1924, the Socialist Academy was finally transformed into the Communist Academy. On November 26, 1926, the Central Executive Committee of the Soviet Union (ЦИК СССР) confirmed the charter of the CA. The academy acquired some success and influence in the 1920s, especially in the social sciences and law. The academy included approximately 100 active members and a number of corresponding members. The goals of the CA were research in social sciences, history, theory and practice of socialism. In December 1929, a Leningrad branch was opened.

The Communist Academy included the following institutes: philosophy, history, literature, art and language, contemporary development and law, world economy and world politics, economics, agrarian studies, natural sciences, and a series of special commissions on specific topics. After reorganization in 1932, the Communist Academy's main focus shifted to socialist development and world economy.

However, the very independence that originally inspired the new academy caused it to run afoul of Joseph Stalin, and he abolished it in 1936, an early manifestation of his rapidly developing purges. According to a decree published on February 8, 1936, the Communist Academy was subsumed within the Soviet Academy of Sciences.

== Library ==
One of the Communist Academy's intitial reasons for existence and primary assets was its large and focused library concentrating on economics, international politics, and the history of the October Revolution and the USSR. The collection was begun in August 1918 when the libraries of several government and private societies which "ceased to exist after the revolution" were accumulated. The next three years were spent in classifying and roughly cataloging these holdings and organizing reading rooms.

In 1925 the library began to conduct serious bibliographic research work, culminating in the publication of several books by the end of the decade, including a bibliography of 37,000 titles relating to the Russian Revolution of 1905, as well as a checklist of official government publications, and an alphabetical subject index to literature relating to Lenin and Leninism, which drew upon 2,265 works in 20 languages. A 170-page book on the history of the Academy's library and its activies was also published.

The library was initially housed in two adjoining mansions, with planning for a dedicated facility begun in 1928. At that date the library's staff included 135 full-time employees, some of whom were employed teaching at the Institute of Library Science in Moscow.

Books were steadily accumulated from across the USSR as they were published and from around the world, with the collection topping the 1,000,000 book mark in the spring of 1928. Approximately 20% of all new accessions came from outside the USSR in that year. The library also maintained an extensive subscription list, receiving 900 international publications in 1928.

The academy's library was preserved as the Fundamental Library of the Social Sciences, which itself became an important part of the still-extant library of the Institute of Scientific Information of the Social Sciences.

== Structure ==
The structure of the Communist Academy changed several times. In 1931, the Communist Academy included 9 separate institutes, the Natural Science Association, 9 scientific journals and 16 Marxist societies. By the beginning of 1934, the following institutions were part of the system of the Communist Academy:

- Institute of Economics (now - Institute of Economics of the Russian Academy of Sciences);
- Agrarian Institute;
- Institute of Soviet Construction and Law;
- Institute of World Economy and World Politics;
- Institute of Philosophy;
- Institute of History;
- Institute of Literature and Art.

And also the Society of Historians-Marxists, the Society of Agrarian-Marxists, the Society of Marxist-statists and others operated. The General Academic Library operated under the Presidium.

== Bulletin of the Communist Academy ==
The VestnikSotsialisticheskoi akademii (Bulletin of the Socialist Academy), a thick journal of history, economics, and political theory, was launched in November 1922. The name of the publication was changed to Vestnik Kommunisticheskoi akademii (Bulletin of the Communist Academy) in 1924, effective with the 7th issue, with the whole numbering scheme unchanged.

The book-length magazine terminated in 1931.

| Year | 1st issue | 2nd issue | 3rd issue | 4th issue | 5th issue | 6th issue | 7th issue | 8th issue |
|---|---|---|---|---|---|---|---|---|
| 1922 | No. 1 | | | | | | | |
| 1923 | No. 2 | No. 3 | No. 4 | No. 5 | No. 6 | | | |
| 1924 | No. 7 | No. 8 | No. 9 | | | | | |
| 1925 | No. 10 | No. 11 | No. 12 | No. 13 | | | | |
| 1926 | No. 14 | No. 15 | No. 16 | No. 17 | No. 18 | | | |
| 1927 | No. 19 | No. 20 | No. 21 | No. 22 | No. 23 | No. 24 | | |
| 1928 | No. 25, (1) | No. 26, (2) | No. 27, (3) | No. 28, (4) | No. 29, (5) | | | |
| 1929 | No. 30, (6) | No. 31, (1) | No. 32, (2) | No. 33, (3) | No. 34, (4) | No. 35-36 | | |
| 1930 | No. 37-38 | No. 39 | No. 40-41 | No. 42 | | | | |
| 1931 | No.1 (Jan) | No.2-3 (Feb-March) | No.4 (April) | No.5-6 (April) | No.7 (July) | No.8-9 (Aug-Sept) | No.10-11 (Sept-Oct) | No.12 (Dec) |

== Chairmen and notable employees of the Communist Academy ==
=== Chairmen of the Presidium of the Communist Academy ===
- Mikhail Nikolayevich Pokrovsky (1924–1932)
- Maximilian Alexandrovich Saveliev (1932–1936)

=== Notable employees ===
- Vladimir Milyutin – from 1925 to 1927, vice-president of the Presidium of the Communist Academy
- Otto Schmidt – Head of the Section of Natural and Exact Sciences
- Abram Deborin – from 1927 to 1931, Director of the Institute of Philosophy
- Vladimir Adoratsky – from 1931 to 1936, Director of the Institute of Philosophy
- Evgeny Pashukanis – from 1927, a full member of the Communist Academy, then a member of its Presidium and vice president, since 1931 director of the Institute of Soviet Construction and Law
- Mikhail Reisner – founding member
- Izrail Agol – from 1928, director of the Biological Institute. K. A. Timiryazeva
- Kliment Timiryazev – full member
- Lev Krtizman – full member
- Vladimir Fritsche – director of the Institute of Literature and Art
- Eugen Varga – from 1927, director of the Institute of World Economy and World Politics
- Alexander Schlichter – full member
- Nikolai Lukin – from 1932, director of the Institute of History
- Ernst Kolman – from 1930, director the Association of Institutes of Natural Science
- Vladimir Bonch-Bruevich – full member
- David Kvitko from 1927 full member

== See also ==
- Institute of Red Professors
- Sverdlov Communist University
