= War communism =

1918–1921 economic and political system in Soviet Russia

"War communism" (Russian: Военный коммунизм, romanized: Vojenný kommunizm), also called "military communism", is a term used to describe the economic and political system that existed in Soviet Russia during the Russian Civil War from 1918 to 1921, while the country was led by Vladimir Lenin. War communism began in June 1918, enforced by the Supreme Economic Council. It ended on 21 March 1921, with the beginning of the New Economic Policy, which lasted until 1928. The system has often been described as simple authoritarian control by the ruling and military castes to maintain power and control in the Soviet regions, rather than any coherent political ideology. The Soviet propaganda justified it by claiming that the Bolsheviks adopted this policy with the goal of keeping towns (the proletarian power-base) and the Red Army stocked with food and weapons since circumstances dictated new economic measures.

The deadly Russian famine of 1921–22 was in part impacted by war communism policies, especially food requisitioning. However, the famine was triggered by bad harvests, harsh winter, drought especially in the Volga Valley which was exacerbated by a range of factors including the war, the presence of the White Army and the methods of war communism. The outbreaks of diseases such as cholera and typhus were also contributing factors to the famine casualties. The Western Entente blockade and wartime embargoes on Soviet Russia have also been identified as an aggravating factor to the growth of the famine.

== Policies ==
It has long been debated whether "war communism" represented an actual economic policy in the proper sense of the phrase, or merely a set of measures intended to win the civil war.

=== Nationalization ===
Initially, the state introduced "workers' control" via factory committees (fabzavkom). This failed because workers prioritized immediate material needs, leading to the "eating up" of capital and the cannibalization of factory equipment for private sale. Following the June 28, 1918 Decree, the state nationalized all large-scale and some medium-scale industries, including sugar, oil, and the merchant fleet. By the end of the Civil War, roughly 37,000 enterprises were nationalized. In November 1920, the state nationalized even small-scale industries with as few as 5 to 10 workers, including village smithies, windmills, and small tailoring workshops. The state also established a monopoly on foreign trade and grain supplies.

The push for the nationalization of apartments and rooms began with a draft proposal on November 25, 1917, and was officially finalized by the decree of August 20, 1918. This decree effectively abolished all private transactions involving real estate, including sales, purchases, and mortgages in cities. In rural areas, the requisition of houses was often handled by village assemblies. The primary targets were "rich" apartments, defined as those where the number of rooms exceeded the number of family members. When these apartments were seized, owners were often forced to leave all furniture behind for the new occupants. In 1919, the state established a formal housing norm of 8–9 square meters per person. This led to a process known as "squeezing" (uplotnenie), where multiple families were forced into large formerly bourgeois apartments to meet the new density requirements. This process was the origin of the communal apartment (kommunalka).

To manage the nationalized economy, the state created the Supreme Council of National Economy (VSNKh). Management was centralized through dozens of "Glavks" (general departments), such as the Main Forest Committee or the Emergency Committee for the procurement of felt boots (Chekvalap).

=== Food requisitioning ===
By February 1918, the "Law on the Socialization of Land" formally established a state monopoly on bread reserves, effectively stripping the rural population of the right to manage their own agricultural output. The practical implementation of food requisitioning evolved into a "food dictatorship" led by the People's Commissariat of Food (Narkomprod) under the direction of Alexander Tsyurupa. Initially, the state attempted a "product exchange" to barter industrial goods for grain, but this effort failed due to ideological mismanagement and the state's inability to provide sufficient manufactured products. This failure led to the decree of May 13, 1918, which granted Narkomprod extraordinary powers to seize grain by force. By January 1919, the state shifted to Prodrazvyorstka, where the central authorities determined the state's needs and mandated the seizure of that amount, regardless of the peasants' actual surplus or survival needs. To enforce these seizures, the state mobilized a militarized apparatus known as the Food Army (Prodarmiya). These units, along with worker-led food detachments (prodotryady), were deployed to the countryside to identify and confiscate hidden reserves, often operating as "military-raider gangs" that committed widespread abuses. Complementing these forces were the Committees of the Poor (Kombedy), established in June 1918 to act as "Communist Red Guards" within villages.

In "debtor" villages that failed to meet quotas, authorities took hostages and held them until the required grain was produced. Reports sent to Lenin described horrific abuses: peasants who failed to comply were stripped naked and driven into the streets, doused with cold water in the winter, or frozen in unheated sheds. The consequence of this aggressive policy was the eruption of a widespread peasant war against the Soviet state. July 1918 alone witnessed over 200 uprisings, and by 1920–1921, insurgent movements like the Tambov rebellion involved as many as 120,000 participants. To crush these revolts, the Red Army utilized heavy artillery and, in 1921, even used poison gas against rebels hiding in forests. Economically, the requisitioning policy proved catastrophic; peasants responded by drastically cutting their sowing areas to avoid seizures, causing grain yields in major regions to plummet to one-quarter of pre-war levels by 1920.

=== Militarization of labor ===
The state implemented extensive forms of coercion and mobilization to sustain the economy and the revolution amidst the severe crisis of the civil war. The foundation of this system was the universal labor principle, which transformed labor from a personal choice into a compulsory social obligation for all citizens under the constitutional slogan "who does not work shall not eat". Another distinct organizational form of mobilization was the creation of labor armies (trudovye armii), which repurposed existing Red Army units for economic tasks during periods of temporary truce. These units maintained their military command structures while performing mass labor projects like logging, transport repair, and agricultural harvesting.

Lenin was heavily influenced by the German model of 'War Socialism' (Kriegssozialismus), criticizing it as a 'military prison for workers' yet also as the necessary material preparation for socialism. He advocated the use of 'barbaric means' to accelerate the implementation of such centralized control in Russia. This policy intensified in early 1920 following major victories in the Civil War; by that time, roughly 4,000 enterprises had already been nationalized. Trotsky, the primary architect and vocal proponent of this system, explicitly stated: 'We do not know free labor... we represent a state that considers itself unfree toward its citizens and, in turn, grants no freedom to those citizens'."

=== Abolition of private trade and markets ===
The Bolsheviks believed that socialism was synonymous with the elimination of commodity exchange. Lenin argued that if exchange remained, it was "ridiculous to even speak of socialism", as free trade inevitably led to the growth of capitalism.

On November 21, 1918, a decree was passed to organize supply, which abolished the remaining private trade apparatus and transferred the responsibility for providing all household and personal goods to the People's Commissariat for Food (Narkomprod).

Open-air markets, such as Moscow's famous Sukharevka, were viewed as remnants of the bourgeois order. By late 1920, the government took decisive steps to permanently close Sukharevka and disperse small traders in major squares to end private enterprise.

The state engaged in unrestricted currency emission, deliberately devaluing the ruble until it could be dispensed with. By May 1918, one ruble was worth only one kopek compared to 1914 prices. The term "bank" was officially abolished, and all remaining banking functions were merged into the State Treasury. Securities, stocks, bonds, and citizens' savings were annulled or frozen.

In late 1920 and early 1921, a series of decrees abolished payments for state services to transition toward "communist" free distribution. This included making housing, railway transport, food rations, fuel, medicine, post, and telephone services free for urban residents.

=== Food and goods distribution ===
The Bolshevik government implemented a centralized system of consumption control known as the class ration (klassovyi paiyok). In July 1918, the state formalised the division of the urban population into four categories:

- Category 1: Those engaged in especially heavy physical labor.
- Category 2: Workers engaged in ordinary physical labor, the sick, and children.
- Category 3: White-collar workers, intelligentsia, and family members of workers.
- Category 4: The 'bourgeoisie' and non-laboring elements, including former owners and traders.

The distribution ratios were strictly hierarchical: in Moscow, the ratio was set at 4:3:2:1, while in Petrograd, it was even steeper at 8:4:2:1. Lenin's explicit ideological goal was to place the bourgeoisie on a "one-eighth" ration or give them nothing at all to ensure the proletariat was fed.

While the masses struggled with the class ration, the Bolsheviks established a parallel system of "Special Distribution" for the elite and essential personnel. In May 1919, the Orgburo created a special fund of consumer goods outside the general plan to satisfy the needs of central government employees and those on special missions. In December 1919, a highly classified ration was established for "irreplaceable specialists". Managed by S. E. Chutskayev, this "arch-secret" list initially included 200 people (and their families), expanding to 370 by mid-1920. Unlike the meager "class rations" given to the public, a special ration typically included meat (25 lbs), butter, sugar, coffee, tea, and tobacco. Records from the VTsIK food department show that high-ranking officials like Lenin, Stalin, and Trotsky received individual deliveries. For example, in November 1920, Lenin's family received priority supplies eight times, including luxury items such as caviar, cheese, and sweets.

== Background and aims ==
Historians have noted that both Tsarist Russia government councils and other opposition parties had advocated for food requisitioning prior to the ascent of the Bolsheviks. However, the goals of the Bolsheviks in implementing war communism are a matter of controversy. Some commentators, including a number of Bolsheviks, have argued that its sole purpose was to win the war. Vladimir Lenin, for instance, said that "the confiscation of surpluses from the peasants was a measure with which we were saddled by the imperative conditions of war-time". Other Bolsheviks, such as Yurii Larin, Lev Kritzman, Leonid Krasin, and Nikolai Bukharin, argued that it was a transitional step towards socialism. Commentators, such as the historian Richard Pipes, the philosopher Michael Polanyi, and economists, such as Paul Craig Roberts or Sheldon L. Richman, have argued that war communism was actually an attempt to immediately eliminate private property, commodity production and market exchange, and in that way to implement communist economics, and that the Bolshevik leaders expected an immediate and large-scale increase in economic output. This view was also held by Bukharin, who said that "We conceived War Communism as the universal, so to say 'normal' form of the economic policy of the victorious proletariat and not as being related to the war, that is, conforming to a definite state of the civil war".

== Results ==
=== Military ===
War communism was largely successful at its primary purpose of aiding the Red Army in halting the advance of the White Army, and in helping the Bolsheviks to re-conquer most of the territory of the former Russian Empire.

=== Social ===
In the cities and surrounding countryside, the population experienced hardships as a result of the war. Peasants, because of the extreme scarcity, were beginning to refuse to co-operate in giving food for the war effort. Workers began migrating from the cities to the countryside, where the chances to feed themselves were higher, thus further decreasing the possibility of barter of industrial goods for food and worsening the plight of the remaining urban population and further weakening the economy and industrial production.Between 1918 and 1920, Petrograd lost 70% of its population, while Moscow lost over 50%. Barrier troops were also used to enforce Bolshevik control over food supplies in areas controlled by the Red Army to protect against raids from anti-communist forces.

A series of workers' strikes and peasants' rebellions against war communism policies broke out all over the country, such as the Tambov Rebellion (1920–1921), which was neutralized by the Red Army. A turning point came with the Kronstadt rebellion at the Kronstadt naval base in early March 1921, which also ended with a Bolshevik victory. The rebellion startled Lenin because Bolsheviks considered Kronstadt sailors the "reddest of the reds". The nature of these uprisings and their leadership were also of significant concern because they were generally left-wing uprisings led by opposition leftists, thus creating competition with the Bolsheviks. According to David Christian, the Cheka, the state Communist Party secret police, reported 118 peasant uprisings in February 1921.

The food dictatorship also dealt a heavy blow to local Soviets. When Soviets in Saratov, Samara, Simbirsk, and elsewhere—where the majority of delegates protected peasant interests—abolished fixed prices and restored free trade, Moscow responded with the decree of May 27, 1918, abolishing the autonomy of local Soviets and concentrating power in the hands of the central Food Commissariat. The Menshevik historian Abramovich bitterly remarked that "those seeking freedom had returned to the old bureaucracy".

Prior to October 1917, the Provisional Government maintained relatively high ration levels (1.5 pounds of bread per day, along with monthly allocations of meat, sugar, and fats). However, following the Bolshevik takeover, these rations were drastically slashed to extreme levels. By the autumn of 1920, a magazine satirically remarked that an entire monthly food ration for one person could fit inside a 'tiny pocket box'. By mid-1918, although nominal wages were 15 times higher than in 1913, workers could only buy five times fewer products than before the war. In the spring of 1919, bread provision through the state system in the Volga region did not exceed 75%, while potato provision was as low as 8%. The bread issued was often of poor quality, heavily mixed with surrogates and impurities.

David Christian, in his book Imperial and Soviet Russia, summarises the state of Russia in 1921 after years of war communism:

A government claiming to represent the people now found itself on the verge of being overthrown by that same working class. The crisis had undermined the loyalty of the villages, the towns and finally sections of the army. It was fully as serious as the crises faced by the tsarist government in 1905 and February 1917.

The deadly Russian famine of 1921–22, which killed about five million people, battered an already war-torn Russia. The measures were harsh, but it did help the Bolsheviks to win the Civil War and stabilize the crisis of the nation. Trotsky had proposed the principles underlying the N.E.P. in 1921 to the Politburo of the Communist Party of the Soviet Union to mitigate urgent economic matters arising from war communism and reproached Lenin privately about the delayed government response in 1922–1923.

=== Economic ===
A black market emerged in Russia, despite the threat of martial law against profiteering. Due to the starvation rations, workers and officials frequently stole products from their factories (such as soap, cloth, or machine parts) to exchange for bread. The ruble collapsed, with barter increasingly replacing money as a medium of exchange and, by 1921, heavy industry output had fallen to 20% of 1913 levels. Additionally, it became common for municipal authorities to offer some workers payment in goods rather than money. 70% of locomotives were in need of repair, and food requisitioning, combined with the effects of seven years of war and a severe drought, contributed to a famine that caused between 3 and 10 million deaths. Coal production decreased from 27.5 million tons (1913) to 7 million tons (1920), while overall factory production also declined from 10,000 million roubles to 1,000 million roubles. According to the noted historian David Christian, the grain harvest was also slashed from 80.1 million tons (1913) to 46.5 million tons (1920).

== See also ==
- Barracks communism
- Council of Labor and Defense
- Family in the Soviet Union
- Left-wing uprisings against the Bolsheviks
- Prodnalog
- Allied intervention in the Russian Civil War
