= Kvitko =

Kvitko (Russian: Квитко, Ukrainian: Квітко) is a gender-neutral Slavic surname. Notable people with the surname include:

- David Kvitko (1889–1942), Professor and activist
- Leib Kvitko (1890–1952), Yiddish poet

== See also ==
- Kvitka
