= Kvitka =

Kvitka may refer to:

- Ivan Kvitka (born 1967), Russian politician
- Kvitka Cisyk (1953–1998), American coloratura soprano of Ukrainian ethnicity
- Hryhory Kvitka (1778–1843) Ukrainian writer, journalist, and playwright
- Klyment Kvitka (1880–1953), Ukrainian musicologist and ethnographer
- Larysa Petrivna Kosach-Kvitka (1871–1913), married name of Ukrainian poet Lesya Ukrainka

== See also ==
- Kvitko
