= Dmitry Schultz =

Russian religious figure and sect leader

Dmitry Ivanovich Schultz
- Дмитрий Иванович Шульц
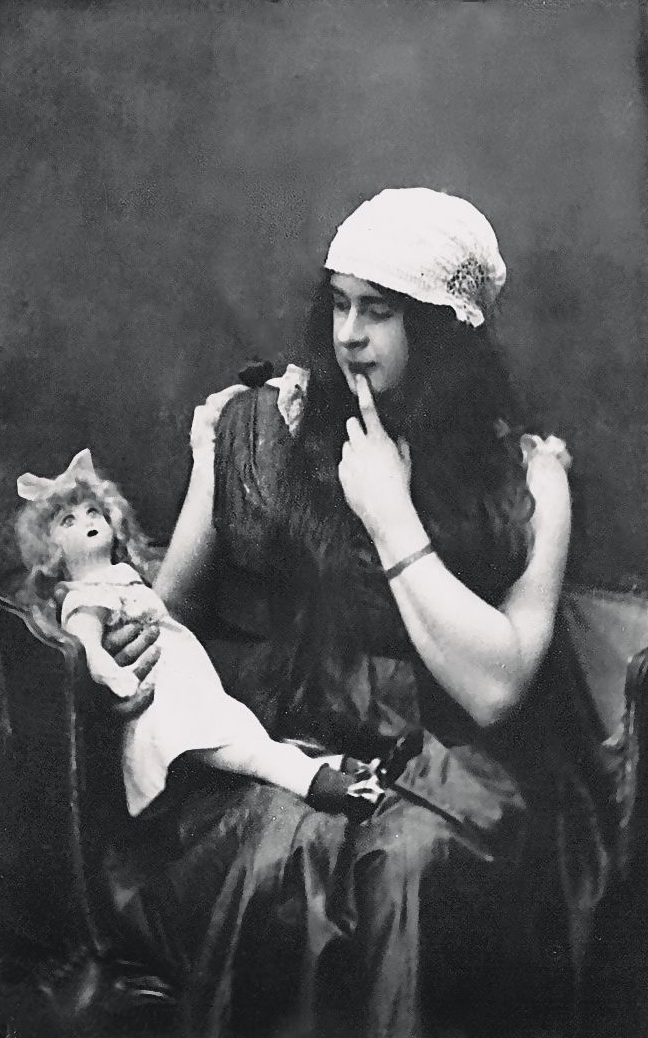
- Dmitry Shultz as Metochka, 1920s. Photo from the collection of the State Museum of the History of Religion.
- Born: 1893; Nizhny Novgorod, Russian Empire
- Died: 2 April 1930 (aged 36–37)
- Occupations: Leader of a religious sect, foreign language teacher
- Spouse: Margo Shultz
- Children: Elvita Schultz, step-daughter

Dmitry Ivanovich Shultz (Note: Olga Khoroshilova, a candidate of art history, refers to Shultz as Ivanovich, while Sergei Nehamkin in his article and an anonymous note threatening the prosecutor and investigator in the sectarian leader's case refer to him as Henrikhovich.) (1893 (?), Nizhny Novgorod, Russian Empire – April 2, 1930, Moscow, USSR) was a religious figure, creator, and leader of the sect United Temple, which operated in the 1920s. Dmitry Shultz developed both the theoretical basis of the sect's activities and thoroughly elaborated its rituals. Dmitry Shultz was born into an intelligent family and showed a talent for writing and theater as a child. He graduated from the Nizhny Novgorod Count Arakcheev Cadet Corps and studied at the Moscow Commercial Institute, where he attended lectures by the theologian Sergei Bulgakov. In the 1920s, he created a community of mystically inclined young people who were initially drawn to the ideas of spiritualism and later to the creation of a new syncretic religion. Over time, elements of sadism, masochism, and sexual perversion began to emerge within this community, which eventually transformed into a totalitarian religious sect with openly anti-Soviet views.

In March 1930, following a trial widely covered by the central press, Dmitry Shultz was sentenced to capital punishment under Article 58-10 of the RSFSR Criminal Code ("for propaganda calling for the undermining or weakening of Soviet power, using religious prejudices") and was executed by firing squad. Ilya Braude, a lawyer and participant in open political trials, was involved in the trial. The forensic psychiatric examination was conducted by prominent scientists and doctors of medicine: Pyotr Gannushkin, Wolf Vnukov, and Yevgeny Krasnushkin. Doctor of Historical Sciences Vladimir Bonch-Bruyevich also participated as an expert on religious studies.

== Biography ==
=== Childhood and adolescence ===
Dmitry Shultz's date of birth is unknown. He was 37 years old at the time of his trial in 1930. His mother was a German noblewoman, descended from an ancient family of Baltic barons. She was fond of mysticism, read the works of Russian philosophers Vladimir Solovyov, Sergei Bulgakov, and writer Dmitry Merezhkovsky, and participated in spiritual séances. His father, a foreign language teacher at Count Arakcheev's Nizhny Novgorod Cadet Corps, did not share his wife's interests but did not try to hinder them either. Dmitry and his younger brother, Henry, were present at and sometimes participated in their mother's spiritualistic experiments, which were held at their apartment in Nizhny Novgorod. On holidays, the family members performed theatrical plays. Dmitry began composing fairy tales at the age of five or six and participated in their production alongside his younger brother. He initially planned to pursue a theatrical career but, at his father's insistence, entered the Arakcheev Cadet Corps, where his father taught. Dmitry began experiencing mystical epiphanies, during which he heard voices and saw "figures of exhausted saints" smiling at him. The pastor characterized the young man as a true believer, but his classmates laughed at him.

Even during his studies at the Arakcheev Cadet Corps, Shultz displayed traits of sadism and sexual perversion. The newspaper Izvestia, in its February 25, 1930 issue, even claimed that the children in the Shultz family, despite their religious upbringing, "engaged in debauchery" from an early age. According to Ilya Braude, Shultz's parents were "withdrawn and pompous people". Their situation was worsened by the family's impoverishment, and their son was "inculcated with an adoration of the 'purity' of Aryan blood, and a sense of superiority over other races and peoples".

After graduating from the Arakcheev Cadet Corps, Dmitry Shultz entered the Moscow Commercial Institute. During his studies, he attended lectures by Sergei Bulgakov, after which he declared himself Bulgakov's faithful student. Based on the philosopher's reasoning about Sophia the Wise and omniscience, Shultz attempted to unite the existing religions into one. He intended to write a thesis on the creation of a Christian state under Bulgakov's guidance, but in 1917, Shultz dropped out of the institute. Vladimir Bonch-Bruyevich reported that when it was Shultz's turn to serve in the army during World War I, he persuaded his fiancée to cut off his finger to avoid being sent to the front.

Another version of Dmitry Shultz's biography was presented by Ilya Braude: After the February Revolution, Shultz left the military school and moved to his parents' estate. During the October Revolution, he worked in an unnamed "backwoods town on the Volga" as a clerk at a factory.

=== Leading a religious sect ===
Schultz had the gift of hypnosis, artistic ability, and ventriloquism. In 1919 (Note: According to other sources, this happened in 1920, and not in Volsk, but in the village of Yuriev.) in Volsk, where he moved with his wife Margot to hide from the draft board, he held his first spiritistic séance in the presence of acquaintances and relatives. Evidence of the presence of spirits included the fall of a cast iron pan and the clinking of dishes. These sounds were made by Margot, who hid in the next room and set the dishes in motion with a long rope tied to these objects. Returning to Nizhny Novgorod, Schultz was given a position as a foreign language teacher at the school Kommuna (the name the Arakcheev Cadet Corps was called after the revolution). In 1920, the school was moved to the village of Yurino, where Schultz resumed spiritistic séances, inviting both his students and villagers. Among the regular attendees were Nikolai Makarov and Grigory Zaitsev (Braude had Grigory Z. and Sergei D., who grew up in religious families), employed in an amateur theater studio run by the medium. An active role in the group of spiritualists was played by Heinrich Schultz (a former staff-captain in the Tsarist army). During séances, dishes fell, spirit voices were heard, and lights went out by themselves; Schultz led the sessions, stating his thoughts in the form of blank verse.

The helper spirits on behalf of whom Schultz prophesied, taking turns acting, were: Marquisette (patroness of children), Matryona Filippievna of Krivoy Zoul (patroness of sect members), Tomás de Torquemada (the Grand Inquisitor who assisted in the exorcisms and consolation of sectarians subjected to corporal punishment), Marguerite Gastner, Casibius, Ulrich von Hutten, Germenochka, Olechka, El-El, Jevanda, and Demeter. In all, about fifty spirits were recorded. The most important of them was considered to be Agathit Abdullah ("the wisest of all the wise men of the earth"). He was born in the Middle East but lived near Derbent. Agathit answered the most difficult questions; in case the questions were simple, he could get offended. In the fall of 1922, the Schultz sect moved to Moscow to the two-room apartment of his wife Margot (located at 65 Bakuninskaya Street). The spouses occupied the larger room, while the other room was occupied by Dmitry's followers, who called each other "brothers" and "sisters". During one of the sessions, Abdullah stated that due to old age he was resigning his duties and handing them over to Dmitry Shultz, who was to be perceived as a prophet. Subsequently, the activity of the sect took place in an apartment on Spiridonovka Street, house 8. It lasted for about 8 years. An Izvestia correspondent and Ilya Braude claimed that Dmitry Shultz headed the sect in Moscow, while his brother Heinrich "expanded and strengthened its Nizhny Novgorod branch". At the time, he was a teacher at the local Industrial and Economic Technical School.

In time, Schultz took on the persona of a four-year-old girl, Metochka. (Note: According to Fedor Putintsev, Metochka is an abbreviated name of the goddess Demeter.) In this image, he was capricious; the students gave him dolls, chocolates, candy, bonnets, lace, and beautiful shoes. When the money ran out, they went to collect alms. The sectarians gave part of the money collected to Heinrich Schultz, the accountant of the United Temple, and used the rest of the money to buy gifts for Metochka. Prophet Agathit Abdullah revealed during a new séance that Metochka was patronized by the ancient Greek goddess Demeter, who gave the community her portrait and a sculpted bust. These were secretly executed by Dmitry Shultz. Both have survived and are now in the collection of the Museum of the History of Religion in St. Petersburg. In turn, the young sectarian Nina Makarova was "transformed" at a spiritualistic séance into a young man. She received a new name —Thomas (in honor of Thomas à Kempis)— her hair was cut off, and she was given men's clothes, as well as vodka, and had her front teeth knocked out.

In the fall of 1929, the district police department received a statement indicating that Nina Makarova, a student of the Moscow Conservatory, was begging on the streets of Moscow. Her classmates were surprised by her appearance: the girl was beaten, sat directly on the sidewalk in her shirt, and gave the impression of being insane. She reported that she lived at 65 Bakuninskaya Street. The police detained a group of sectarians there. In total, the sect had about 30 members.

The correspondent of the magazine Smena and Ilya Braude saw in the collection of alms an anti-Soviet action. According to them, Schultz purposely directed his admirers to "crowded intellectual neighborhoods" and demanded that they stand "with outstretched hands near foreign embassies", "let the noble foreigners see the full horror of Soviet reality and socialism".

=== Legal process and trial ===
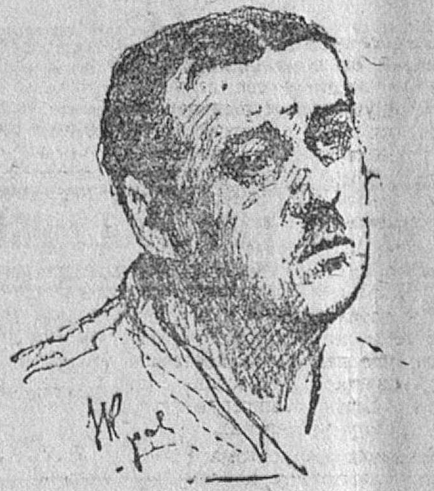
Nikolai Kravchenko. Dmitry Shultz, 1930

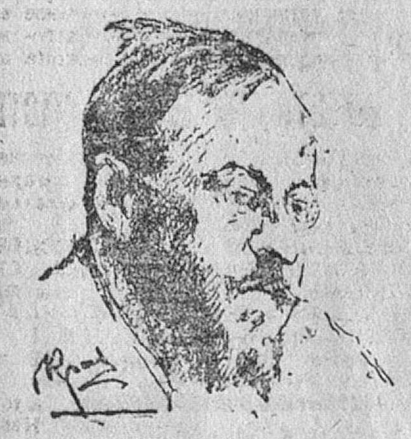
Nikolai Kravchenko. Heinrich Schultz, 1930

During the investigation, Dmitry Shultz presented himself as a "common quacker" who had created the sect for purely mercenary purposes. He frankly confirmed that he was throwing objects apparently "emerging" from nowhere and moved objects using a rope during spiritualistic séances. Toward the end of the investigation, he abruptly changed his position: he recanted the testimony he had already given and began to portray himself as a victim of his own 'unshakable faith and delusions'. Shultz's lawyer, Ilya Braude, believed that his client was pinning his hopes on the recognition of his insanity during the forensic psychiatric examination. Braude himself was also betting on this: pathological features prevail in Schultz's personality and deeds, and it is impossible to consider him quite normal. Braude, who was present during the interrogations, later recalled that flattering, soft, and ingratiating with representatives of the authorities, he was unrecognizably transformed when confronted during confrontations with his recent followers of the United Temple. His tone was at once imperious and commanding.

While the preliminary process was underway, the prosecutor's office received an anonymous message written with blood, demanding the release of Dmitry Shultz and threatening to reprisal those who would try him.

Only four leaders of the sect became defendants at the trial: Dmitryy, Heinrich, and their spouses, Margo and Elena. The rest of the sect members were involved only as witnesses. Some of them testified in the company of medical personnel, as they were in a state of nervous and mental shock.

The trial of the sect members in the Moscow City Court attracted public and press attention. The defendant Dmitry Shultz admitted hatred of Soviet power, the creation of the sect, bullying and corporal punishment of its members, transvestism, and adventurism. He admitted that he had deceived sectarians and did not believe in spirits himself. His lawyer was Ilya Braude, a participant in such major trials as those of the Industrial Party Trial, the 1931 Menshevik Trial, the Parallel Trotskyist Center, and the Case of the Anti-Soviet "Bloc of Rightists and Trotskyites", while the other accused were defended by other lawyers. The public prosecutor was a representative of the League of Militant Atheists.

Dr. Vladimir Bonch-Bruevich, a doctor of historical sciences, presented his opinion as an expert religious scholar. He insisted that Shultz pursued a practical goal—to influence the psyche of the sectarians, and special rituals were created for this purpose. A commission consisting of psychiatrist professors Peter Ganushkin, Wolf Vnukov, and Evgeny Krasnushkin recognized the defendant as sane. Yevgeny Krasnushkin, MD, professor at Moscow State University, devoted his speech at the trial to the reasons for the blind obedience of an entire group of people to the will of Dmitry Shultz. He stated:

A suggestor needs either his own deep conviction or a great game. Every hypnotist has a known game. All good acting, both actor and orator, has an element of suggestion in it. Dmitry Shultz had such a game. He is all in one: a performer, a dancer, and a magician. The combination of all this is enough for the suggestive... What "material" do we have on the other side? These are persons who from childhood have been inclined to religious mysticism or are mentally limited... Such persons who have received induced insanity under the influence of hypnosis, having been placed in other conditions, when all the lies, falsehoods, and games of their hypnotist have been revealed to them, have recovered from their mental disorder, have recovered.

At the trial, Margot Shultz was sentenced to five years in camps. Heinrich Shultz received ten years in camps with confiscation of property. The sect's leader, Dmitry Shultz, was sentenced to capital punishment and confiscation of property. Elena Shultz was declared insane and sent for a clinical trial. (Note: Ilya Braude conveyed the court's decision regarding her differently: "The case of Elena Shultz, according to the conclusion of experts, was singled out for special proceedings, and she was sent to the Serbsky Institute for a clinical trial".) Dmitry Shultz filed a cassation appeal and a petition for pardon requesting that the death penalty be commuted to imprisonment; his petition for clemency was denied. On April 2, 1930, Dmitry Shultz was shot[39]. Ilya Braude, who drafted the text of the appeal and petition with Shultz, later recalled that Shultz had a "conversation with him in the same characteristic dual form: on the one hand, he said that he was only a charlatan; on the other hand, he claimed that he was a misunderstood prophet, that the world would remember him more than once".

Nikolai Kitaev, a candidate of law, honorary employee of the Prosecutor's Office of the Russian Federation, and honored lawyer of the Russian Federation, pointed out that although Shultz was convicted under Article 58-10 of the Criminal Code of the RSFSR (for propaganda containing a call to undermine or weaken Soviet power, using religious prejudices — a crime against the state) his actions fell under Article 123 of the RSFSR Criminal Code (committing deceptive acts with the aim of arousing superstition in the masses of the population, to derive any benefits by this means). This article provided for an incomparably milder punishment — corrective labor work for up to one year.

The famous Soviet artist, journalist, and writer Nikolai Kravchenko attended the trial and created pencil drawings of the accused. These drawings were published in the newspaper Izvestia on March 2, 1930.

== Private life ==
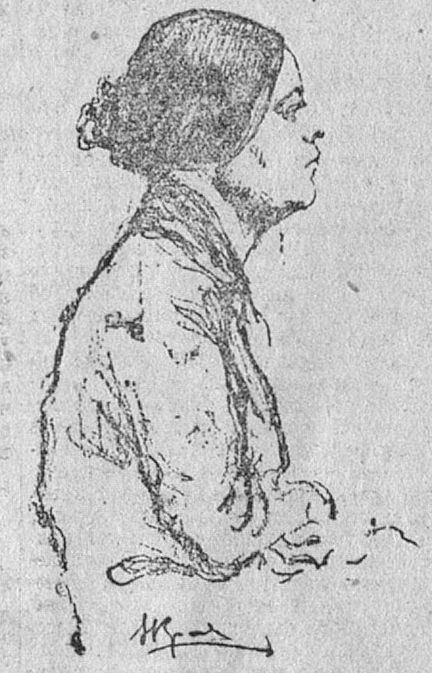
Nikolai Kravchenko. Margo Schultz, 1930.

Ilya Braude described Schultz as "a man of large stature, with a plump face, large black eyes, rounded shoulders, and feminine manners".

Dmitry Shultz was married, but was described as single during the trial. The couple had an adopted daughter, Elevira, who became one of Dmitry Shultz's early victims of torture. In his youth, he sensed a feminine aspect within himself but did not disclose it to his parents, revealing his secret only later to his wife. Margo Shultz told about her marital relationship during her husband's tria the following:

Dmitry was very feminine, and I liked him very much. When he wore a dress and long hair, I used to call him "my doll" because he was incredibly charming and handsome. I gave him dolls, and he had an entire closet full of them.

Regarding the orders in the community and family, Margo said: "No one could think or object, otherwise we all received severe punishment". Nina Makarova testified at the trial that when her mother came for her, she was beaten, threatened with being thrown out the window, and the girl herself was hidden. Thirty-eight burned crosses were found on Nina's body. She was brought into the sect at the age of 16.

When Schultz became the head of the sect, he stopped working and lived off the contributions of the rank-and-file members. He maintained a special notebook where he recorded "who, how much, and when they had to pay him". There were instances when sect members, unable to make their payments on time, were forced to pawn their personal belongings. One testified at the trial: "He accumulated a great deal of money from us. He threw luxurious parties while we went half-starved, ragged, and burdened with unpayable debts". The journal Bezbozhnik reported that the sect leader had not worked for five years. Bonch-Bruyevich described Schultz as "a modern little inquisitor", noting his sentimentality towards flowers and birds but his insane hatred towards humanity.

Dmitry Schultz was well-versed in literature, skilled in drawing and sculpting, played the cello and violin, composed poetry, danced, wrote and directed plays, and had the ability to hypnotize. Nikolai Kitaev, a candidate of law, described Schultz, based on the testimony of Ilya Braude who knew him closely, as "a representative of an old noble family, a teacher by profession, a man with a higher education who spoke foreign languages and was quite widely erudite". Vladimir Bonch-Bruyevich noted the "original, juicy, and peculiar" language of Dmitry Schultz's writings, and characterized him as "a sybarite who likes to drink and eat, especially at other people's expense".

== Theoretical foundations of Dmitry Schultz's doctrine and the sect's rituals ==
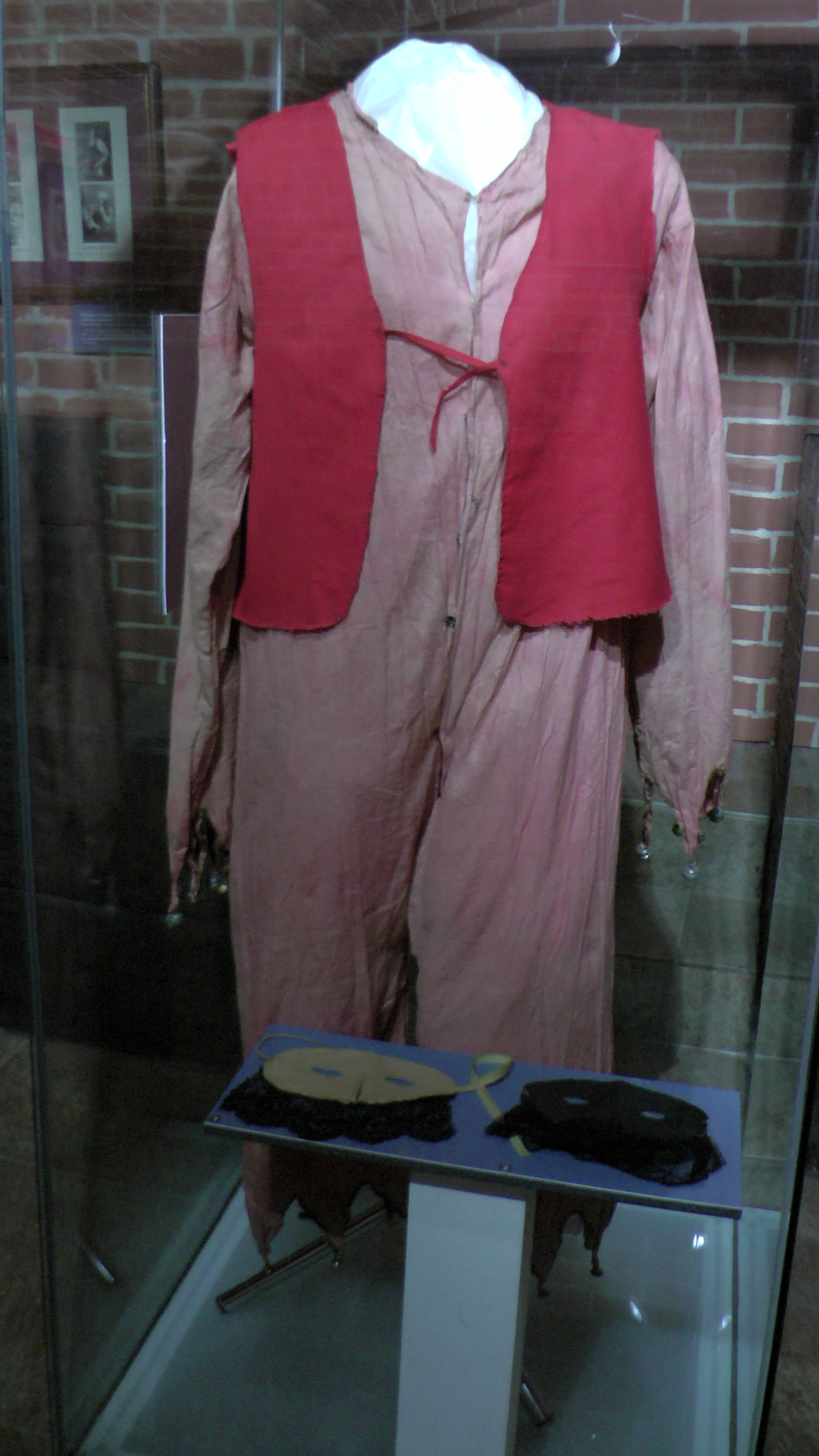
Ritual clothes of the United Temple sect at the exhibition The Age of Ghosts. Spiritism at the turn of the 19th - 20th centuries at the Museum of the History of Religion.

The doctrine was based on the idea of unifying religions, the theory of Wisdom Sophia, and the mystical union of man with God. This was further influenced by Dmitry Merezhkovsky's ideas of Christ and Antichrist, Fyodor Dostoevsky's The Grand Inquisitor, Vasily Rozanov's philosophy of eros, and Vladimir Solovyov's concept of the great androgyne. The textual foundation for the new religious doctrine was considered to be the four-hundred-page Consolation. (Note: Ilya Braude, in Schulz's multi-volume legacy, which he consulted during the sectarian trial, distinguished three types of writings: canonical, fictional, and dramatic.) This book, which Schultz allegedly received from Agathitus Abdullah, was also regarded as the doctrinal basis. Spiritualistic séances were complemented by worship, including "readings" and "praises." The Great Word was deemed the most important part of the Consolation. Other writings elucidated and expanded on the Great Word, such as On Good and Evil, On the Temple, On Love, On Prayer, and On Vanity. The Consolation had a distinctly political tone, denouncing Vladimir Lenin and Mikhail Kalinin (and, according to Bonch-Bruyevich, also Joseph Stalin) as demons and antichrists, Karl Marx as "the great prophet of Satan," and Soviet newspapers as "demonic leaflets". Industrial enterprises were considered tools of the devil. Antisemitism was preached. The working class was referred to as "donkeys," Soviet power was called "chaos of chaos", serving in the Red Army was forbidden, and sabotage was encouraged, (Note: Ilya Braude wrote: "He indoctrinated the flock daily that in enterprises and institutions, one should treat work carelessly, negligently, after hours. But to do it discreetly, stealthily, so as not to deprive oneself of one's livelihood".) with armed struggle against the existing regime being permitted. Betrayal of the sect was punishable by death. Vladimir Bonch-Bruyevich wrote that sectarian movements under tsarism represented "an oppositional current that could and should, with the right approach, be at least partially used in the interests of the revolutionary movement," but "a number of sectarian organizations, especially the new ones (e.g., the United Temple, the Ioannites), were counter-revolutionary organizations". He also noted that the Consolation was composed in imitation of the Gospels, the Revelation of John the Theologian, and the apostolic epistles and writings of the Church Fathers. The author of the article noted that Schultz was not characterized by non-resistance to evil by violence and vegetarianism.

In his teachings, Schultz claimed to be a prophet and reformer (in the text he refers to himself as Daughter of the Earth and Illustrious Vestryman) who had replaced the dilapidated Orthodoxy, Catholicism, and Islam, and who could unite these three religious movements (he gave special preference, however, to Christianity in its earliest form as presented in the Gospels). At the same time, he was sharply negative towards sectarianism, which he believed distorted these religions. Bonch-Bruyevich found in the texts of the Consolation Schultz's claims to be both a priest and a "'living god' here on earth".

Later, a special book, Words about Labor, was added to the Consolation. Yuri Ardi considered it the most counter-revolutionary, particularly because it contained a prophecy about the future bombing of the Kremlin. Schultz opposed social ownership and cooperative ownership, stating: "The machine in a collective enterprise is the most disgusting idol before which workers now bow down. A machine in private production is good". He distinguished between creative labor, which he believed was accessible only to a select few individuals, and craft labor, which he thought the rest of humanity engaged in. Schultz regarded the development of large industry and the mechanization of labor as forms of slavery, which Bonch-Bruyevich considered an influence of primitively understood anarchism.

According to Braude, Schultz's sect consisted mainly of students and working youth. Another perspective, expressed in 1930 by the magazine Smena and the newspaper Izvestia, suggested that the sect was composed of the petty bourgeoisie and young people from intellectual families. Vladimir Bonch-Bruyevich described Schultz's followers as "people with artistic education," "with inclinations to music and singing," and "who showed creative talents," but did not specify their social origin. Fyodor Putintsev referred to members of the sect as students of music, theater, and art technical schools, attributing this to the prevalence of individuals from class-alien strata in these educational institutions. According to journalist Yuri Ardi, who attended the trial against the sect's leaders, its rank-and-file members admitted: "First Schultz made us believe in spirits, and then the spirits made us believe in Schultz". Schultz attracted young and inexperienced individuals, traumatized by failure, kept away from public life, and raised in religious families. The methods employed by Schultz (detailed rituals of the sect) and the content of his teachings contributed to transforming his disciples into "wordless slaves." The complete isolation from the outside world, which occurred in the sect, and the denial of everything outside the One Temple, prevented members from escaping the leader's influence. Punishments became "instruments of suppression of will, of autonomy, of protest".

In the religious teachings of Vladimir Solovyov, Dmitry Schultz considered the philosopher's ideas about androgyny to be the most significant. In Schultz's interpretation of Solovyov's thoughts, Adam and Eve, having engaged in carnal relations, became aware of their differences. This awareness, according to Schultz, led to the fall into sin and a rupture between man and God. The hope for restoring the union between them lies in spiritual life and sacred love. These forces will reunite male and female in the sacred, immortal being that God originally created in His own image. Schultz considered himself a woman in a man's body, and enjoyed playing with dolls, sewing, doing housework, and cooking. He adopted the image of a four-year-old girl because, in his view, a girl represents an image close to an androgyne. A girl knows no carnal love, is therefore innocent, and, from this perspective, is an angel and an androgyne. The girl rewarded obedient students but, according to Olga Khoroshilova, a candidate of art history, "was a psychopath and a sadist": she flogged the guilty with birch rods, beat them with sticks, burned them with hot iron, and tore pieces of meat from their bodies with pliers. The reasons for punishment could include spilled soup, an unfriendly look, a mistake in quoting a fragment from Consolation, Metochka's bad mood, poorly washed laundry, stepping on the cat's tail, the appearance of flies in Schultz's room (five strokes of the stick for each fly), visiting a movie theater, club, theater, appearing at the military commissariat, or participating in public demonstrations. After punishment, the wounded area was carefully smeared with iodine, which then became a pretext for further tortures:

There were continuous bloody ulcers, which Dmitry took pleasure in smearing with iodine, admiring how we squirmed in pain. Dmitry was fond of applying bandages... [iron scorched on the body] crosses, while he scrubbed the ulcers from burns with such force that we writhed and screamed in agony, and he took pleasure in our suffering.

Schultz himself claimed that the punishments were introduced to strengthen willpower in anticipation of the coming of the kingdom of God. A special list of the adherents' transgressions, known as the "continuation account", was maintained.

Nikolai Makarov testified that the first punishment introduced into the sect's practices was flogging. Subsequently, they began using a two-tailed whip with rings sewn into the ends, sharp wire, and iron rods. Kneeling on peas were also practiced. By the end of 1928, cauterization of the body with red-hot crosses made of iron wire was introduced. Drunkenness and "verbal libations" were encouraged, leading to sectarians beating each other (usually in the face). Nikolai Makarov testified:

Dmitry always admired fights and would wink at each participant, encouraging them to hit their opponent harder. Interestingly, when Dmitry observed someone experiencing severe physical pain or saw a lot of blood, he would become immediately satisfied and order the fighting to stop. Once, I saw Dmitry twitch his shoulders with a sense of voluptuousness at each blow during flogging by Gregory Otto.

From such statements by cultists, Bonch-Bruyevich concluded that Dmitry Schultz's purpose was to obtain "perverted satisfaction".

During "special celebrations," the members of the sect "indulged in unrestrained debauchery," a practice justified in a separate work by Dmitry Schultz, Word on the Flesh. In this work, the disciples were "urged not to limit their desires in anything". Fyodor Putintsev and Vladimir Bonch-Bruyevich noted that sodomy was practiced during the orgies, with Dmitry Schultz himself taking on the passive female role. According to sect member Nikolai Makarov, the spirits during spiritualistic séances attempted to turn him away from the female sex and awaken in him a sexual interest in the girl Metochka.

The sect was called the One Temple. It developed its own rituals and symbolism. The symbol of the sect was a crescent moon with a cross and an Eye of Providence. The sect's khorugv featured colored stripes: yellow symbolized God the Father, blue represented Christ, white denoted purity, and green stood for the earth and Schultz himself. Services were conducted in white robes, modeled after ancient Greek chitons. On the Feast of Beauty (Dmitry Schultz's birthday), theatrical performances based on Schultz's plays were held. Schultz designed the costumes himself. There are photographs taken during the holiday preserved.

Some of the vestments used by the sectarians during the mysteries have also been preserved. These include a petticoat of white cotton cloth, a satin nightgown, a white dress with short sleeves cut off at the waist, three black masks decorated with lace, and a jester's costume with gold galloon and bells. They are all held in the collections of the Museum of the History of Religion. After the trial, these items were transferred along with the documents to the Central Anti-Religious Museum in Moscow, and later, as a separate collection, they became part of the archive of Dr. Vladimir Bonch-Bruyevich, Doctor of Historical Sciences, at the Museum of the History of Religion in St. Petersburg. A large number of photographs depicting sectarians are also part of the Museum of the History of Religion's collection. Schultz is featured in most of these photographs wearing women's clothing and a wig. Among his photographic portrayals are a dancer and a preacher behind a pulpit. According to Ilya Braude, some of these photographs were clearly pornographic in nature. Schultz's portraits of "gloomy figures with demonic features" — "spirits" worshipped by the sectarians — were presented at the trial.

== Study of Dmitry Schultz's biography and views ==
In February and March 1930, the Soviet press closely followed the trial against the sect's founders. Three articles were published in the newspaper Izvestia, one in the journal Bezbozhnik, and a large article in the journal Smena. Vladimir Bonch-Bruyevich, who acted as an expert at the trial, published an article in the journal Antireligioznik entitled The Community of the One Temple (Towards the Trial of Dmitry Schultz). In this work, he analyzes Schultz's teachings in detail but scarcely addresses the facts of his biography. A brief section on the sect was included by Fyodor Putintsev, a researcher of sectarianism and a member of the Central Council of the Union of Militant Godless People of the USSR, in his 1930 book Kulak Light-Prevention (Cases of Insanity and Mass Religious Psychosis Based on Kulak-Provocative Rumors about the 'End of the World'). Soviet atheist organizer Alexander Lukachevsky, in his 1933 book Marxism-Leninism as Militant Atheism, cited the Schultz sect as an example of brutality and open counter-revolutionary activity. He argued that as socialism is developed amid intensified class conflict, similar sects should be expected to emerge in the future. (Note: Lukachevsky had expressed the same idea almost verbatim in his article Socialist Reeducation of Workers and the Struggle Against Religion, published a year earlier.)

In the final years of his life, Ilya Braude, the former lawyer of Dmitry Schultz, was preparing his memoirs, Notes of a Lawyer, for publication. He entrusted them to his friend Georgy Osipov, a journalist, writer, and member of the Union of Soviet Writers, for literary processing. Osipov supplemented the text during personal meetings with Braude. Braude died suddenly in March 1955, interrupting the work on the edition. Georgy Osipov, with the assistance of Braude's daughter Nora, completed the manuscript and prepared it for printing by 1974. Initially, some chapters were published in the magazines Druzhba Narodov, Man and Law, and in the supplement to the newspaper Izvestia — the weekly illustrated newspaper Nedelya. The book was later published as a separate edition by the publishing house Soviet Russia. The case of the sect United Temple is discussed in a separate chapter entitled Snake's Nest. Braude's materials and the publication in Izvestia were utilized in the 2006 expanded edition of Nikolai Kitaev's lecture Hypnosis and Crime, intended for law students.

In 2020, the magazine Rodina published a comprehensive article by Olga Khoroshilova, candidate of art history and associate professor at Saint Petersburg State University of Industrial Technologies and Design, about Dmitry Schultz. The article was based on materials from the holdings of the Museum of the History of Religion. A year later, in a significantly revised and expanded form, this article was included in Khoroshilova's monograph Russian Travesties in History, Culture, and Everyday Life.

The article Images of Cult Objects in the Collections of the State Museum of Religious History's Photographic Library by Pyotr Fedotov, head of the Photonegamultimedia Department, provided a brief description of the collection of photographs of the Schultz Sect held by the Museum of the History of Religion.

External videos
- | A fragment of a guided tour about Dmitry Shultz's activities. Conducted by the curator of the exhibition - Natalia Veprikova

In January 2022, the Museum of the History of Religion in St. Petersburg opened the exhibition The Age of Ghosts: Spiritism at the Turn of the 19th-20th Centuries, curated by Natalia Veprikova. A separate final room of the exhibition was dedicated to the sect United Temple and its founder and leader. The press highlighted the unusual design of the exhibition: visitors descended a narrow spiral staircase into a semi-basement room where the exhibits were displayed under ancient brick vaults. Among the exhibits were a sculptural bust of Demeter (a self-portrait of Dmitry Schultz) and a threatening note to the organizers of the trial of the sect leaders: "Do not torment him in the dungeon, let him out. This plea is written in our blood. If you do not release him, your blood will be spilled. We wait until R. H. and seven days more. You will be killed".

== Dmitry Shultz in modern journalism ==
On December 6, 2020, the Ekho Moskvy radio station aired a public discussion on the trial of Dmitry Schultz. The presenters were Sergei Buntman (First Deputy Editor-in-Chief of Echo of Moscow) and Alexei Kuznetsov (historian, Echo of Moscow presenter, and history teacher at Moscow Gymnasium No. 1543). They provided additional information to fill gaps in Dmitry Schultz's biography. In particular, they revealed that his father was a German from Prussia, born and raised in Germany, who came to Russia in the 1880s. Schultz's development was influenced by his father's despotism and the traditional bullying of younger students by older ones in the Arakcheev corps.

Considerable attention was given to the personality of Ilya Braude and his role in the trial. According to Alexei Kuznetsov, Braude was "a brilliant lawyer, an excellent orator, and a man who graduated from the law faculty of a major university before the revolution," but remained loyal to the Soviet authorities. He "imitated an active defense," "actively participated in the examination of witnesses," "made motions," and "spoke in debates," giving the public the impression of a fair trial. However, he "left the prosecution, so to speak, an absolutely comfortable situation". Kuznetsov believes that Schultz's performance at the trial marked the beginning of Braude's distinguished legal career. Kuznetsov also contends that Schwartz, who had by then become a prominent lawyer, had invited Braude. Kuznetsov disagreed with the qualification of Schultz's crime, arguing that it was more consistent with Articles 123 ("Committing deceptive acts to arouse superstition in the masses for personal gain"), 155 ("Compulsion to engage in prostitution or maintenance of brothels"), or 58.14 ("Use of religious prejudices to overthrow workers' and peasants' power or incite resistance to its laws and regulations").

In 2015, the newspaper Argumenty Nedeli published an article by Sergei Nehamkin titled 50 Shades of Grey in the Soviet Way: 85 Years Ago We Had Our Own Erotic Thrillers. Nehamkin was the first to highlight the similarities between the sect's history and the plot of Dmitry Bykov's novel Ostromov, or the Sorcerer's Apprentice (a connection later noted by Alexei Kuznetsov). The novel is based on the true case of the Masonic circle of Boris Astromov (Kirichenko). The article contained several inaccuracies. For instance, it incorrectly stated that Dmitry Schultz was sentenced to death and that "others" were exiled, with "several" members of the circle considered for treatment in a mental hospital.

== Bibliography ==
=== Primary sources ===
- Арди, Ю. К. (1930). В болоте мистики и религии (на процессе Дмитрия Шульца) (PDF) (in Russian). Смена: Журнал. p. 14.
- Религиозное изуверство (in Russian). Безбожник: Журнал. 1930. p. 9.
- Н. Н. (1930). Секта Шульца (in Russian). Известия: Газета. p. 5. ISSN 0233-4356.
- С. Б. (1930). Секта Шульца (in Russian). Известия: Газета. p. 6.
- Секта Шульца (in Russian). Известия: Газета. 1930. p. 5.

=== Researches and non-fiction sources ===
- Бонч-Бруевич, В. Д. (1972). Ленин о религии // Избранные атеистические произведения (in Russian). M.: Мысль. pp. 20–44.
- Бонч-Бруевич, В. Д. (1930). Община единого храма (К процессу Дмитрия Шульца) (in Russian). Антирелигиозник: Журнал. pp. 23–37.
- Брауде, И. Д. (1974). Змеиное гнездо // Записки адвоката. Научные труды (in Russian). M.: Советская Россия. pp. 83–95.
- Глезеров, С. (2022). В Музее истории религии открылась выставка о спиритизме на рубеже XIX—XX веков (in Russian). Санкт-Петербургские ведомости: Газета. ISSN 1029-9734.
- Китаев, Н. Н. (2006). Гипноз и преступления. Лекция для специальности 021100 (Юриспруденция) (in Russian). Иркутск: БГУЭП. p. 76. ISBN 5-7253-1344-1
- Лукачевский, А. Т. (1933). Строительство социализма и борьба с религией // Марксизм-ленинизм как воинствующий атеизм (in Russian). M.: Государственное антирелигиозное издательство. pp. 69–80.
- Лукачевский, А. Т. (1932). Социалистическое перевоспитание трудящихся и борьба против религии // Воинствующее безбожие в СССР за 15 лет. 1917—1932. Сборник Центрального совета Союза воинствующих безбожников и Институт философии Коммунистической академии (in Russian). M.: ОГИЗ, Государственное антирелигиозное издательство. pp. 15–48.
- Осипов, Г. О. (1974). Несколько слов о «Записках адвоката» // Брауде И. Д.. Записки адвоката. Научные труды (in Russian). M.: Советская Россия. pp. 5–6.
- Путинцев, Ф. М. (1930). Поповско-кулацкая подоплёка религиозных безумств // Кулацкое светопреставление (случаи помешательства и массового религиозного психоза на почве кулацко-провокационных слухов о «конце света») (in Russian). M.: Безбожник. pp. 64–68.
- Федотов, П. В. (2010). Образы объектов культа в коллекциях фототеки ГМИР (in Russian). Vol. 10. Труды Государственного музея истории религии: Журнал. pp. 12–17. ISSN 2712-780X.
- Хорошилова, О. (2021). "Ch. 16. Казус Шульца". Русские травести в истории, культуре и повседневности (in Russian). M.: Манн, Иванов и Фербер. pp. 439–452. ISBN 978-5-0016-9552-3.
- Хорошилова, О. (2020). «Средневековый шабаш, разврат и членовредительство...». Поучительная история мракобесной московской секты, представшей перед судом 90 лет назад (in Russian). Родина: Журнал. pp. 117–121. ISSN 0235-7089.

=== Encyclopedias and handbooks ===
- Алфавитный указатель трудов // Бонч-Бруевич В. Д.. Материалы к биобиблиографии учёных СССР (in Russian). Vol. 5. M.: Издательство Академии наук СССР. 1958. pp. 85–112.

=== Journalism and fiction ===
- Нехамкин, С. (2015). «50 оттенков серого» по-советски. 85 лет назад у нас разворачивались свои эротические триллеры (in Russian). Аргументы недели: Газета. ISSN 1991-5381.
