= Vladimir Dal Russian State Literature Museum =

Museum in Moscow of Russian literature

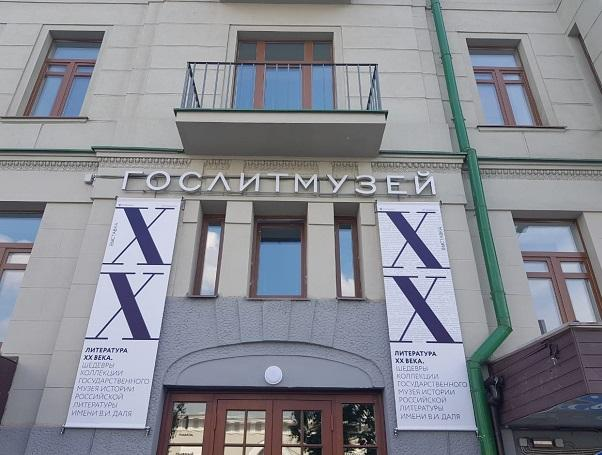
- Established: 1921
- Location: Moscow, Zubovsky Boulevard, building 15, structure 1
- Visitors: more than 100,000 per year
- Director: Dmitry Bak
- Website: Official website

The Vladimir Dal Russian State Literature Museum is the largest museum in Russia of the history of Russian literature, created on the initiative of Vladimir Bonch-Bruyevich. As of 2021, the museum consisted of 12 departments, and its collections comprise more than 600,000 storage units.

The museum's directorate is at building 15, Zubovsky Boulevard, Moscow.

== History ==
The Vladimir Dal Russian State Literature Museum has a rich and complex history. According to the author of the concept of the country's central literary museum, Vladimir Dmitrievich Bonch-Bruyevich (1873–1955), the idea for the museum took shape as early as 1903, when he was living in exile in Geneva. The history of the present museum traces back to the creation of two museums dedicated to the legacy of Russian authors of classics. Moscow State A. P. Chekhov Museum, founded in October 1921. Its collections are held mainly in the funds of the Dal museum, which traces its lineage from that date and was preparing to mark its centenary in October 2021.

The initiative to create a museum dedicated to another author of Russian classics, F. M. Dostoevsky, was also founded in 1921, on the eve of the writer's centenary. The Dostoevsky Museum was founded in 1928, and in 1940 it became part of the country's main literary museum.

Of particular significance in the history of the Dal museum is the establishment in 1933, on the initiative of V. D. Bonch-Bruyevich, of the Central Museum of Fiction, Criticism and Journalism. Its collections included museum objects acquired, among other things, as a result of the work of the state Commission for the Identification of Monuments of Literature and Art of the Peoples of the USSR Located Abroad, established in 1931.

Considerable financial resources were allocated to support the commission's work, including from gold and foreign exchange reserves. Given how difficult the period at the turn of the 1920s–1930s was for the USSR, it becomes evident that the creation and development of the main literary museum of a literature-centric country was a paramount state objective.

On 16 July 1934, by order of People's Commissar of Education A. S. Bubnov, the Central Museum of Fiction, Criticism and Journalism was abolished, and in its place the State Literary Museum was created, which, according to this order, no longer had legal autonomy and was incorporated into the State Library of the USSR named after V. I. Lenin. A difficult period began for the country's main literary museum, which soon managed to regain its status as an independent cultural institution.

By the late 1930s, the museum's collection numbered hundreds of thousands of relics: manuscripts, books, documents, photographs, paintings, graphics, decorative and applied arts objects, and memorial items. It was at this time that many valuable collections entered the museum, a highly professional team was formed, and intensive scholarly and publishing activities began.

By 1941, the museum's holdings consisted of more than three million storage units and included manuscripts, books, documents, photographs, as well as decorative and applied arts objects and writers' and poets' memorial belongings. That same year, by a decision of the Soviet Government, the majority of items in the manuscript collection were confiscated and transferred to the authority of the Main Archival Administration of the NKVD for the organization of the Central State Literary Archive (now RGALI).

By a decree of the Council of People's Commissars of the RSFSR of 6 October 1943, On the Organization of the Academy of Pedagogical Sciences, the State Literary Museum (GLM) was abolished. Only a month and a half later, following a series of appeals to the CC of the AUCP(b), the situation was reconsidered and the museum was reinstated as an independent institution. Once the situation stabilized, the museum resumed building its collections, including manuscript materials. During the war, the museum received about 5,000 documents that had been confiscated from repressed writers and literary figures, and in the 1950s and 1960s it acquired a large quantity of literary and documentary materials. The manuscript collections department currently holds more than 80,000 manuscripts organized into more than 500 collections of Russia's major writers. The museum is now among Russia's leading repositories, whose holdings include handwritten books from the 15th–19th centuries, as well as extremely rare autographs of V. A. Zhukovsky, N. V. Gogol, A. I. Herzen, I. S. Turgenev, F. M. Dostoevsky, I. A. Goncharov, A. N. Ostrovsky, F. I. Tyutchev, A. P. Chekhov, A. A. Blok, N. S. Gumilev, V. V. Mayakovsky, M. I. Tsvetaeva, A. A. Akhmatova, O. E. Mandelstam, S. A. Yesenin, I. A. Bunin, M. A. Bulgakov, K. G. Paustovsky, K. M. Simonov, M. A. Sholokhov, and others.

Starting from 1940, museum departments organized in the former memorial homes and apartments of Moscow writers began to join the museum, and its extensive collection made it possible to create a full-fledged exhibition in each of the newly formed departments.

On 26 July 1963, pursuant to an order of the Ministry of Culture of the USSR, the museum officially received the status of "the leading museum entrusted with coordinating the research and exhibition work of similar museums in the country and providing them with consultative and methodological assistance". Over the following decades, with the direct participation of staff from the country's flagship literary museum, dozens of museums were created in various regions of the USSR, including major ones that are now widely known, and many permanent exhibitions at leading literary museums were updated.

On 20 August 1984, by decree of the Supreme Soviet of the USSR, the museum was awarded the Order of the Friendship of Peoples.

== Present day ==
In 2014, a part of the museum's holdings was placed in a new building in Shelaputinsky Lane. This had been constructed in the 1830s and 1840s on the foundation of stone chambers dating from the late 18th century. The mansion is planned to house the Museum of Sounding Literature, which will display materials from the sound recording collection created under the direction of Lev Shilov. As part of the modernization project, a national center, "Ten Centuries of Russian Letters", is also planned for house no. 37 on Arbat.

In 2015, the museum suggested forming an Initiative Group of Leading Literary Museums of Russia, which was followed by the establishment of the Association of Literary Museums in 2018. The association operates as a section of the Union of Museums of the Russian Federation.

On 24 April 2017, the country's flagship literary museum received a new official name: Vladimir Dal Russian State Literature Museum. This name fully corresponds not only to the modern mission of the country's largest literary museum, but also to the concept of its main "ideologist", V. D. Bonch-Bruyevich, who believed that the cornerstone condition for the existence of this cultural institution should be a combination of the functions of five cultural institutions: the museum itself, as well as an archive, a library, a research institute, and a publishing house.

Dal is the figure that serves as a metaphor for our museum's mission: we want it to be an internationally recognizable brand, like those of other cultural institutions abroad. We are convinced that the Dal Museum will represent the entire history of Russian literature, which has lasted many centuries both within and beyond our country. (Director Dmitry Bak)

On 29 May 2019, exhibition halls in the museum's new building at 15 Zubovsky Boulevard, in the former tenement house of the Lyuboshchinskys, opened to visitors.

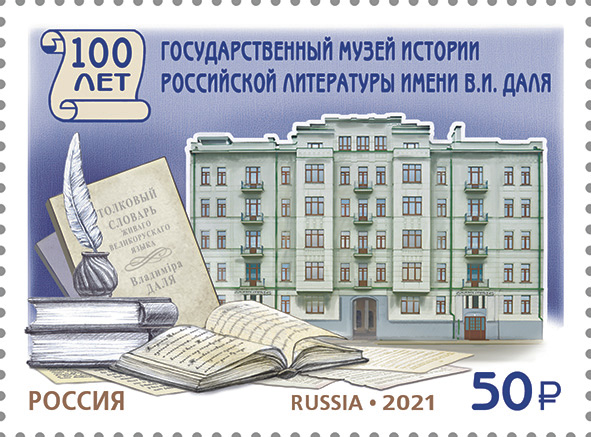
The museum building and V. I. Dal's dictionary on a Russian postage stamp of 2021 to mark the centenary of the State Museum of the History of Russian Literature named after V. I. Dal

As of 2021, the museum's holdings comprised more than 600,000 storage units. Its research library holds more than 175,000 volumes. It holds personal archives of writers and figures of Russian culture from the 18th to 20th centuries, engravings of the 17th and 18th centuries with views of Moscow and Petersburg, painted portraits, miniatures depicting statesmen, handwritten and early printed books of spiritual content, the first books of civil print from the Petrine era, extremely rare books with autographs, manuscripts, drawings by writers, paintings, rare photographs, and copies of works by Gavrila Derzhavin, Denis Fonvizin, Alexander Radishchev, Nikolay Karamzin, Alexander Griboyedov, Mikhail Lermontov, Nikolai Gogol, Anton Chekhov, Fyodor Dostoevsky, and other materials related to the history of Russian classical and contemporary literature, numbering more than half a million storage units.

== Directors ==
- 1933–1940 — Vladimir Dmitrievich Bonch-Bruyevich
- 1940–1941 — Nikolai Vasilyevich Boyev
- 1941–1944 — Polina Lvovna Vaynshenker
- 1945–1946 — Ivan Grigoryevich Klabunovsky
- 1946–1955 — Boris Pavlovich Kozmin
- 1955–1959 — Nikolai Ivanovich Sokolov
- 1960–1966 — Nikolai Fyodorovich Piyashev
- 1966–1972 — Alexander Dmitrievich Timrot
- 1972–2006 — Natalia Vladimirovna Shakhalova
- 2006–2013 — Marina Semyonovna Gomozková
- 2013–present — Dmitry Petrovich Bak

== Departments ==
Illustration	Name	Address	Description
	House of Ilya Ostroukhov in Trubniki	Trubnikovsky Lane, 17, structure 1	Exhibition halls of the museum in the former mansion of the artist and collector Ilya Ostroukhov, who lived there from 1890 to 1929. The department has no permanent exhibition, so temporary exhibitions are held here.
Zubovsky Boulevard, 15, structure 1	Lyuboshchinsky–Vernadsky Tenement House	Zubovsky Boulevard, 15, structure 1	The multi-apartment tenement house on Zubovsky Boulevard was built in 1912 by M. M. and A. E. Lyuboshchinsky. Within a short time it became a residence for the Moscow intelligentsia. The house was frequently visited by Lyuboshchinsky's brother-in-law, academician V. I. Vernadsky. The department, which opened in 2019, hosted temporary exhibitions. Since 2021, the house, which is the museum's central building, has been home to its new department — the Museum of the History of 20th-Century Literature.
	Mikhail Lermontov House Museum	Malaya Molchanovka Street, 2	A museum dedicated to the life and work of Mikhail Lermontov, in the mansion where he lived with his grandmother Elizaveta Arsenyeva from 1829 to 1832. The branch opened in 1981 at the initiative of the writer and television presenter Irakly Andronikov. As of 2018, the collection included antique furniture of the 19th century, a collection of lifetime editions, photographs, and images of the poet's family and friends.
	Alexander Herzen House Museum	Sivtsev Vrazhek Lane, 27	A museum dedicated to the writer Alexander Herzen, housed in a wooden Empire-style mansion from 1820, where Herzen lived from 1843 to 1847. The museum opened in 1976 at the initiative of the writer's relatives. As of 2018, the collection included more than five hundred exhibits: lifetime editions, photographs, and personal belongings of the writer.
	Fyodor Dostoevsky Apartment Museum	Dostoevsky Street, 2	The museum opened in 1928 and has been part of the Literary Museum since 1940. It is in the former building of the Mariinsky Hospital, in the annex of which the Dostoevsky family lived from 1821 to 1837. As of 2018, the exhibition included antique furniture, family photographs, and personal belongings of the Dostoevsky family.
	Anton Chekhov House Museum	Sadovaya-Kudrinskaya Street, 6, structure 2	A museum dedicated to the writer Anton Chekhov is in the house where he lived with his family from 1886 to 1890. The permanent exhibition opened on 14 July 1954 to mark the fiftieth anniversary of Chekhov's death. The museum's collection began to take shape in 1912, and includes personal belongings of his family and their circle, photographs, furniture, paintings and graphics, as well as lifetime editions and archival documents.
	Silver Age Museum	Prospekt Mira, 30	In 1999, a branch opened in the mansion of the merchant Ivan Bayev, where the writer and poet Valery Bryusov lived from 1910 to 1924. The museum houses an exhibition dedicated to the literary movements of the early 20th century: symbolism, acmeism, avant-gardism, and futurism.
	Lunacharsky Memorial Study	Denezhny Lane, 9/5, apt. 1	It was founded in 1962 following the death of the widow of Anatoly Lunacharsky, Natalia Rozenel. It is on the fifth floor of the house in Denezhny Lane where the Lunacharsky family lived from 1924 to 1933. As of 2018, the memorial apartment was closed for restoration.
	Alexei Tolstoy Apartment Museum	Spiridonovka Street, 2, structure 1	The museum is in the annex of the Stepan Ryabushinsky mansion, where the writer Alexei Nikolayevich Tolstoy lived from 1941 to 1945. It opened in 1987 in accordance with Tolstoy's widow's will. The main exhibition is housed in three rooms: the study, the dining–sitting room, and the bedroom, which displays a collection of antique furniture.
	Mikhail Prishvin House Museum	Moscow Oblast, Odintsovsky District, Dunino	The memorial museum of Mikhail Prishvin opened in 1980 in accordance with the will of the writer's widow, Valeria Prishvina. Its exhibition consists of the writer's restored rooms: the dining room, the study, his wife's rooms and the veranda, as well as the library.
	Korney Chukovsky House Museum	Moscow Oblast, Vnukovskoye settlement, Serafimovich Street, 3	The memorial museum of Korney Chukovsky opened in 1994 in the house where the he lived from 1938. The memorial atmosphere of the house was preserved by his daughter Lydia and granddaughter Elena, who also became the museum's first tour guides.
	Boris Pasternak House Museum	Moscow Oblast, Vnukovskoye settlement, Pavlenko Street, 3	The museum opened in 1990 to mark the 100th anniversary of the birth of Boris Pasternak. It is in the house where he lived from 1939. The memorial atmosphere was fully preserved by Pasternak's relatives.
	Information and Cultural Center "Museum of Alexander Solzhenitsyn" in the city of Kislovodsk	Stavropol Krai, Kislovodsk, Borodinsky Lane, 3	The exhibition spaces are in the house of M. Z. Gorina's aunt, where Solzhenitsyn lived from 1920 to 1924. In 2009, the museum was transferred to the State Literary Museum for restoration. It opened in 2014, and in 2015 the first permanent exhibition became accessible to visitors.

== Awards ==
- Order of Friendship of Peoples (1984)
- Acknowledgement of the President of the Russian Federation (21 April 2022) — for contributions to the preparation and holding of events dedicated to the 200th anniversary of the birth of F. M. Dostoevsky
