= Socialist Academy of Social Sciences =

Soviet educational establishment

- Социалистическая академия общественных наук
- First issue of the Bulletin of the Socialist Academy of the Socialist Academy, №1, November 1922
- Other name: Социалистическую академию
- Active: 25 June 1918–17 April 1924
- Parent institution: VTsIK
- Affiliations: Left SR; Bolsheviks
- Rector: Mikhail Pokrovsky
- Location: Khamovniki District, Moscow, Russian Soviet Republic
- Language: Russian

The Socialist Academy of Social Sciences (Russian: Социалистическая академия общественных наук; SAON) was an educational establishment created in Russia in October 1918 with "the aim of studying and teaching social studies from the point of view of scientific socialism." The original name of the academy was chosen over the proposal to call it the "Communist Academy", owing to objections raised by Left Socialist-Revolutionaries. They had supported the Bolshevik seizure of power in November 1917, but had withdrawn that support in March 1918. Nevertheless, they continued their involvement in such institutions as the Socialist Academy at this time.

On 17 April 1924, the Academy was transformed into the Communist Academy.

== Bulletin of the Socialist Academy ==
From 1922, the Academy published a bulletin Вестник Социалистической академии (Bulletin of the Socialist Academy). After six issues, the numbering continued under the title Вестник Коммунистической академии" (Bulletin of the Communist Academy).
