= Lev Kritzman =

Soviet economist

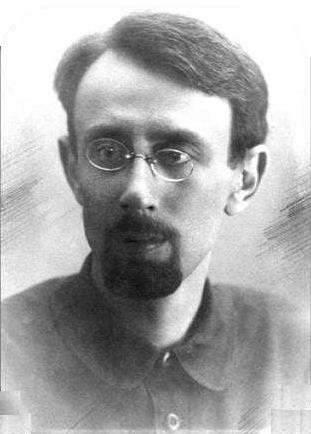

Lev Natanovich Kritzman (Russian: Лев Натанович Крицман; 16 June 1890 – 17 June 1938) was a Soviet Marxian economist who became a prominent advocate of state planning in the 1920s Soviet economy. After 1929, his views on agricultural reform were aligned with mass collectivisation and dekulakization introduced by Joseph Stalin.

== Biography ==
In 1905 Krirtzman joined the Menshevik wing of the Russian Social Democratic Labour Party. He was expelled from the University of Odessa in 1910, but continued his education in exile. He graduated from the University of Zurich and received a doctorate in philosophy.

He returned to Russia in after the October Revolution 1918 and joined the Russian Communist Party (b). Kritzman worked the state economy and was a member of the board of the State Planning Committee and the Central Statistical Directorate.

Kritzman was a member of the editorial board of Pravda and a member of the Communist Academy. He also taught at the Institute of Red Professors, Sverdlov Communist University and the Moscow State University.

From 1926 to 1929 he was executive editor of the journal On the Agrarian Front and a member of the editorial board of the journal Problems of Economy as well as a member of the editorial board of the Great Soviet Encyclopedia. He was also the editor of the Economic Encyclopedia. Kritzman wrote many books and polemics and socialist construction as well as criticisms of non-Marxist political economy.

He staunchly opposed the theory of Alexander Chayanov and the family labor school. He fought for the justification of the three-tier scheme of differentiation of the peasantry (poor peasant -middle peasant - kulak), which became one of the foundations of the dekulakization policy in 1929–1933.

Hardly any information is available about Krizman's last years, which apparently were largely spent on private studies. In Soviet and Russian publications, it is usually noted that he succumbed to kidney disease in June 1938. On the other hand, some recent publications from English speaking sources claim that Krizman fell victim to the Great Purge, however there isn't any evidence to support this. His death is sometimes dated to have happened in June 1937. An obituary in connection with his death was signed by Eugene Varga, Abram Deborin, Gleb Krzhizhanovsky and Stanislav Strumilin.

He was buried at the Novodevichy Cemetery and his estate is kept in the Archives of the Russian Academy of Sciences.
