= David Kvitko =

Professor and activist (1889–1942)

David Yurievich Kvitko (Russian: Квитко Давид Юрьевич; 4 March 1889 [O.S. 20 February] Bratslav, Ukraine - 5 February 1942, Ashgabat) was a Marxist-Leninist activist, philosopher and translator active in the United States of America and subsequently in the Soviet Union where he became a professor at the Moscow State University.

David emigrated to the United States of America in 1913. Initially he worked in a garment factory in New York and became an activist in the American Socialist Party. In 1919 he was part of a section of the party broke away to form the Communist Party USA.

== A Philosophic Study of Tolstoy ==
He studied at several US universities, gaining a doctorate at Columbia University for A Philosophic Study of Tolstoy (1927), which was the first American book-length study of Leo Tolstoy. His doctorate was assessed by a committee consisting of John Jacob Koss, Irwin Edman, Herbert Schneider and John Cooley who did not share his Marxist-Leninism. Kvitko argued that Tolstoy was revolutionary rather than a reformist, i.e. he did not think that shorter working hours and higher wages would resolve the problems in society. While pointing out inconsistencies in Tolstoy views on such matters as art, he nevertheless also grounded his critique on a psychological view of Tolstoy based on William James's approach. Rather than dwelling on inconsistencies he found in the work of Tolstoy, he regarded Tolstoy's views as rooted in his temperament, whereby his pacifism is derived from his pessimism and quietism.
